= Key Underwood Coon Dog Memorial Graveyard =

Animal cemetery in Alabama, US

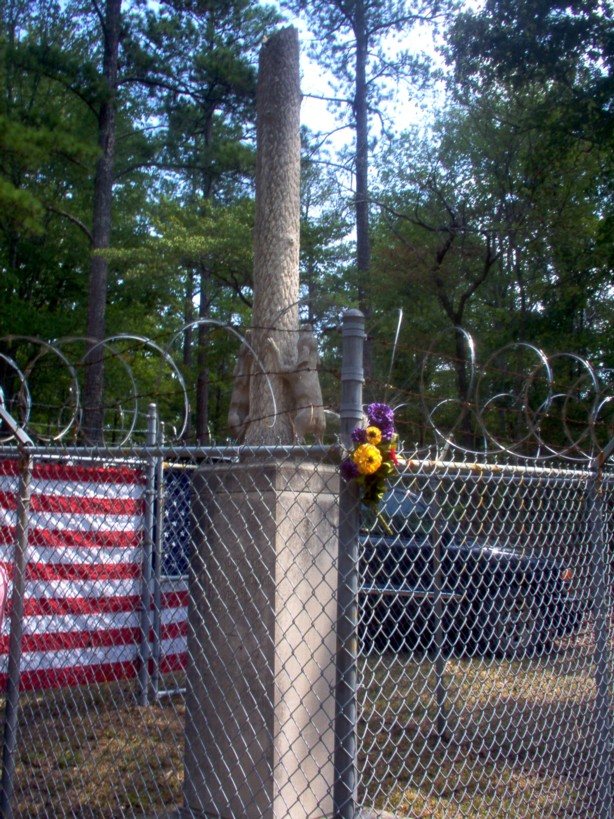
- Coon Dog Monument
- Interactive map of Key Underwood Coon Dog Memorial Graveyard

Details
- Established: September 4, 1937
- Location: 4945 Coondog Cemetery Road, Colbert County, Alabama, US
- Coordinates: 34°37′48″N 87°58′00″W
- Type: Private
- Website: http://www.coondogcemetery.com

The Key Underwood Coon Dog Memorial Graveyard is a specialized and restricted pet cemetery and memorial in rural Colbert County, Alabama, US. It is reserved specifically for the burials of coon dogs. The cemetery was established by Key Underwood on September 4, 1937. Underwood buried his own dog there, choosing the spot, previously a popular hunting camp where "Troop" did 15 years of service. As of August 2014, more than 300 dogs were buried in the graveyard.

Maintained by the Tennessee Valley Coon Hunters Association, it receives nearly 7,000 visitors annually.

Criteria for burial are fairly well established, albeit being subject to interpretation and application. Only bona fide "coonhounds" are to be buried there. The exact measure of that standard depends on breeding, experience and performance; and seemingly depends on who and when the tale is told and the determination made.

== History ==
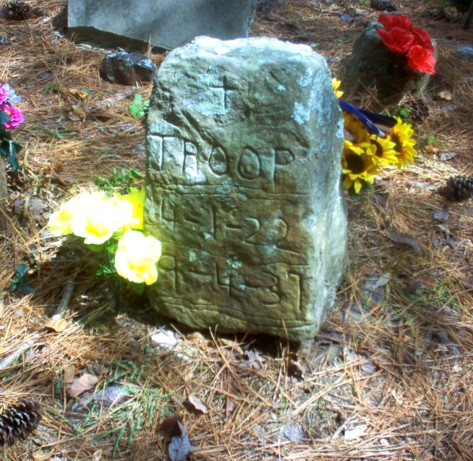
Troop's grave, the oldest in the cemetery

Key Underwood established the cemetery on September 4, 1937, interring his coon dog, Troop, in an old hunting camp located in rural Colbert County, Alabama, US. The closest town is Cherokee, Alabama. At the time, Underwood only intended to bury Troop in a place they had coon hunted together for 15 years. The memorial was a serendipitous afterthought. Underwood buried Troop there, three feet deep, with an engraved old chimney stone for a marker. Later, other bereaved hunters followed his example when their dogs died, and the cemetery flourished as a result. The entrance is marked by a statue of two coonhounds treeing a raccoon. During a 1984 interview with columnist Rheta Grimsley Johnson, Underwood said that burying Troop was doing "something special for a special coon dog". Allowance of mere pets is contraindicated. "It would reveal that you must not know much about coon hunters and their dogs, if you think we would contaminate this burial place with poodles and lap dogs."

== Requirements for burial ==
Dogs must meet three requirements to qualify for burial at the cemetery:

- the owner must verify that their dog was a purebred coonhound
- a witness must declare that the dead animal is a coon dog
- a member of the local coonhunters' organization must be allowed to view the remains. The cemetery is not actually "breed specific" but at a minimum requires that the dog was actually used to hunt coons, and not something else. Admission criteria are game specific. Quoting O'Neal Bolton, former caretaker of the Coon Dog Graveyard, the cemetery's website notes:
  "We have stipulations on this thing, ... A dog can't run no deer, possum — nothing like that. He's got to be a straight coon dog, and he's got to be full hound. Couldn't be a mixed up breed dog, a house dog."

Along with recognized breeds — i.e., "Redbone, black and tan, English bluetick, English redtick, Plott, Treeing Walker, and various combinations of the above" — "many non-AKC breeds of Southern hunting hounds (such as our native frontier hounds, the Black Mouth Curs, Plott Hounds, Catahoulas, and Mountain Curs)" may be admitted, but then must be proven to meet all three of the criteria, and have no fewer than three witnesses who will attest that they have seen the dog track and tree coons single-handedly.

== Features ==
Headstones and markers in the cemetery range from homemade metal and wooden monuments to more intricate marble engraved stones, akin to human gravesites. They range from humble and home made to relatively well-crafted and ostentatious. Each reveals a touching story and makes a tribute. Some have epitaphs, such as "He wasn't the best, but he was the best I ever owned". The interred dogs include many notable hunting dogs such as Hunter's Famous Amos, Ralston Purina's 1984 Dog of the Year. It is the only cemetery in the world specifically dedicated to coonhounds. By 2014, over 300 dogs were buried in the cemetery.

There are two monumental sculptures.

The entrance is festooned with warning signs, some pocked with many bullet holes, which advise visitors of surveillance by the neighborhood; another forbids lighting fires, and stresses only coon dogs buried with permission are allowed.

Caretaker and contact person for the cemetery was Janice M. Williams, a.k.a. the "Coon Dog Lady", who is the cemetery board's president. She was the first reported person to actually "count the graves scattered across that pastoral acre: 307 as of January 2014. She keeps it presentable (without care the forest quickly encroaches)."

As the 75th anniversary of the cemetery approached, coins and replica service medals started to be left on the graves.

The cemetery evolved, as has the sport of coon hunting. "These days hunting's about competition... Used to, people hunted [raccoons] for their hides or in the Depression, they ate them, but we don't shoot [raccoons] anymore." Dogs are supposed to be independent, capable of hunting on their own, and "honest, meaning it won't run deer or rabbits; and it'll stay put, meaning it'll stay no matter rain, a storm, or another dog aggravating it," says Lee Hatton, grounds caretaker. A United Kennel Club title requires beating other champions and "It takes 100 hard-earned points to become a champion."

The facility is officially recognized as an historic cemetery by the State of Alabama.

== Labor Day ==
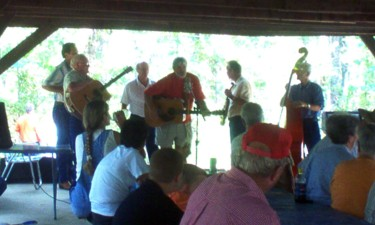
Travis Wammack entertains the crowd at the 2007 Labor Day Celebration

Every Labor Day the Tennessee Valley Coon Hunter's Association sponsors a gathering at the cemetery in a tribute to the inauguration of the cemetery on Labor Day in 1937. The celebration includes bluegrass music, dancing, barbecue and a liar's contest. Admission is free to the public, but donations are accepted and help defray upkeep expenses. In 2014 eight Redbone Coonhound puppies were sold at the gathering, with proceeds going to upkeep. The gathering is often attended by local politicians.

== Popular culture ==
The cemetery was featured in the movie Sweet Home Alabama, but the producers used artistic license to relocate it to south Alabama. The film's protagonists go looking for the graves of dogs named "Bear" and "Bryant", an homage to Bear Bryant the football coach.

== See also ==
- Armstrong, William H. Sounder novel (1969) and film (1972)
- Gates of Heaven documentary film about the Pet cemetery business
- Hunting with hounds
- Rainbow Bridge (pets)
- Rawls, Wilson. Where the Red Fern Grows, children's novel and two film adaptations 1974 and 2003.
- The Hunt (The Twilight Zone)
