= American English Coonhound =

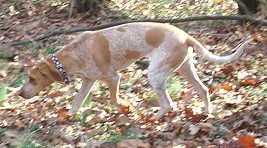
- A female American English Coonhound
- Other names: English Coonhound; Redtick Coonhound
- Origin: United States
Traits
Height	Males	22–27 inches (56–69 cm)
	Females	21–25 inches (53–64 cm)
- Weight: In proportion to height
- Coat: Short to medium
Kennel club standards
- American Kennel Club: standard
- United Kennel Club: standard

The American English Coonhound, also referred to as the English Coonhound or the Redtick Coonhound, is a breed of coonhound that originated in and is typically bred in the Southern United States. It is descended from hunting hounds, especially foxhounds, brought to America by settlers during the 17th and 18th centuries. The breed's first recognition came from the United Kennel Club in 1905 as the English Fox and Coonhound. Further recognition has been granted in recent years by the American Kennel Club, first in the Foundation Stock Service and in 2011 as a fully recognized member of the hound group.

The breed is of medium size, and their coats come predominantly in three types: redtick, bluetick, and a tricolor tick pattern. The English Coonhound has a high prey drive and, while it is typically used in raccoon hunting, it is also skilled in treeing. This breed is generally a healthy one, though sometimes prone to bloat.

== History ==
The breed's ancestry can be traced back to foxhounds brought to the United States by European settlers during the 17th and 18th centuries. It shares a common ancestry with all other coon hounds, with the exception of the Plott Hound. The breed developed from Virginia Hounds, which were developed over time from dogs imported to the United States by Robert Brooke, Thomas Walker and the first President of the United States, George Washington. The terrain in Virginia was much rougher than what the dogs were used to, so they were bred over time to better adapt to the new conditions. It was traditionally used to hunt raccoons by night and the American red fox by day. The United Kennel Club (UKC) first recognized it in 1905 as the English Fox and Coonhound.

The Treeing Walker Coonhound was recognized separately by the UKC in 1945, separating it from the English Fox and Coonhound breed. The following year, the Bluetick Coonhound was also split into an entirely different breed.

The English Coonhound was accepted into the American Kennel Club's Foundation Stock Service as the American English Coonhound in 1995. On 1 January, 2010, it was moved up to the Miscellaneous Class. Following the recognition of the breed by the AKC in the hound group on 30 June 2011 as the 171st breed, the American English Coonhound became eligible to compete in the National Dog Show in 2011, followed by its eligibility for the Westminster Kennel Club Dog Show and the AKC National Championship for the first time in 2012.

== Description ==
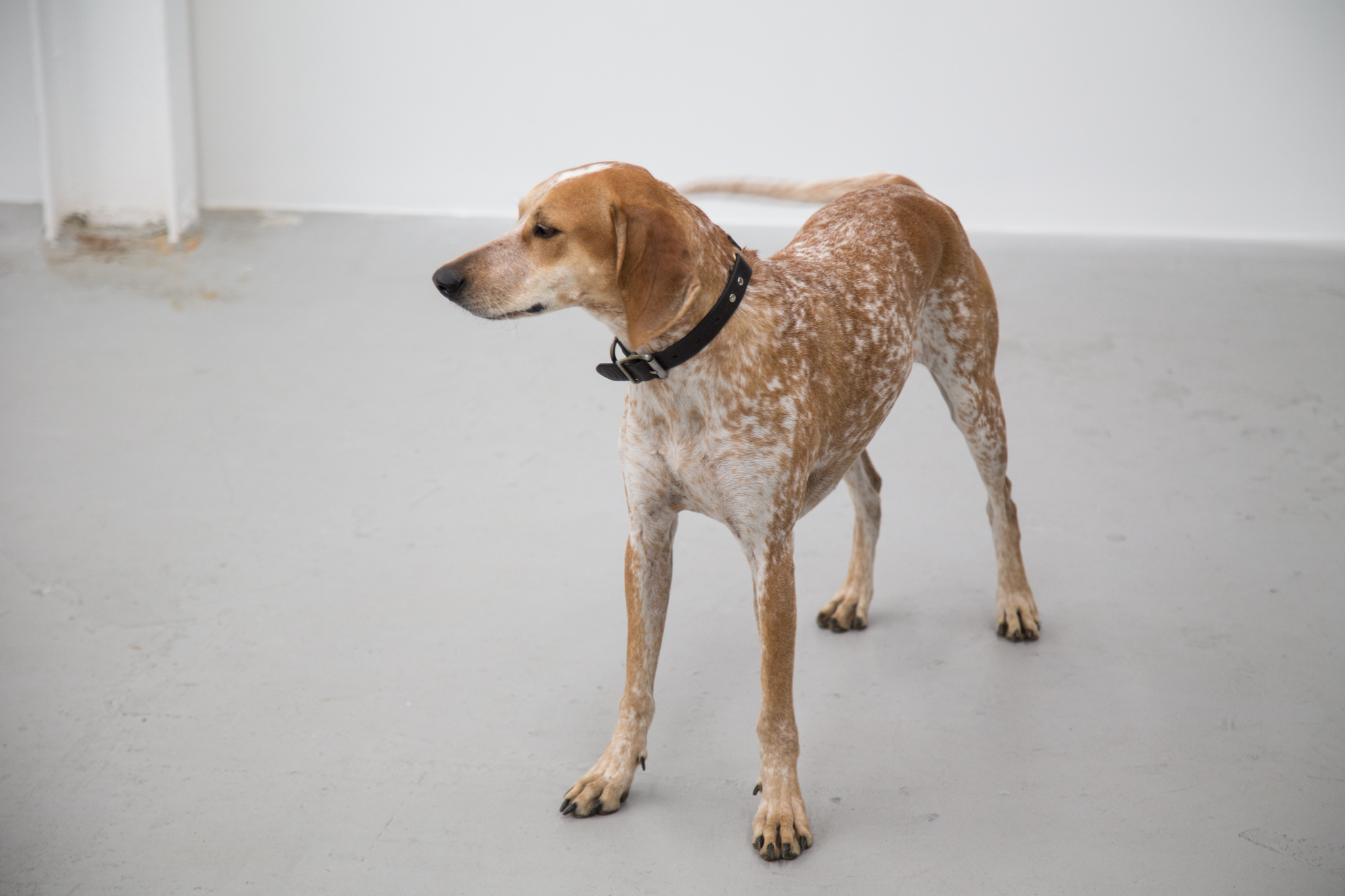
A redticked English Coonhound.

Male English Coonhounds measure between 22–27 inches (56–69 cm) at the withers, with females being slightly smaller at 21–25 inches (53–64 cm). The weight of a Coonhound should be in proportion to the dog's height.

Unlike the other breeds of coonhounds, a variety of colorations is acceptable to meet English Coonhound breed standards. Accepted colorations are redtick, bluetick, tricolored with ticking, red and white, and white and black. They can be tricolor with ticking but this is a disqualifying fault; other disqualifications include brindle and solid colors with less than 10% ticking. Color variations are common even among pups from the same litter of English Coonhounds, indicating high levels of DNA diversity in the breed. The coat is short and coarse.

== Temperament ==
English Coonhounds require regular exercise to keep in prime condition but are generally mellow when not on the prey's tail. English Coonhounds usually make good house pets. They have a high prey drive and will chase small animals, including other pets (e.g., cats), unless trained otherwise. Because of this, they are not always recommended for households with small pets unless they have been raised around small animals. They are generally good with children and tend to be very loyal dogs that are eager to please their owners. Like most puppies, younger English Coonhounds can be quite inquisitive and destructive and obedience training early is highly recommended, as is providing them with plenty of attention and exercise.

Like all coonhounds, English Coonhounds are generally good-natured and very sociable dogs. Skittishness or aggression is considered a defect according to UKC breed standards. They make excellent family pets, as they have been bred to coexist amiably within a pack, as well as to be efficient hunters. English Coonhounds also make adequate watch dogs, as their vocalizations are characterized by melodious, drawn-out bawls and short, explosive chops typical of hound-type dogs.

=== Hunting ===
The breed has proven popular with coon hunters and has a powerful nose which enables it to track both small and large game, including raccoons, cougars, and bears. One of the types of hunting that the breed is used for is treeing, in which the dogs are used to force climbing animals up into trees where they can be cornered and shot by hunters.

While known for their ability in this type of hunting, they can lose their ability to pace themselves and, on occasion, stand their ground when they believe that they have chased their prey up a tree, even if they have not. They can have a one-track mind while hunting and tune everything else out, including commands. Against cougars and bears, they can keep the larger game in position until the hunters arrive. They have become a favored breed in coon hunting.

== Health ==
English Coonhounds can be prone to overheating while on coon hunts during the summer months in the Southern United States. Breeders who specialize in this breed screen their potential pairs for hip and elbow dysplasia, as well as any eye disorders. Like any other floppy-eared dog breed, the English Coonhound should have its ears checked frequently to ensure minimal wax and debris buildup. Their large size and deep chest also makes them susceptible to bloat, a sometimes life-threatening disease.

== See also ==
- List of dog breeds
