= Coon hunting =

Practice of hunting raccoons

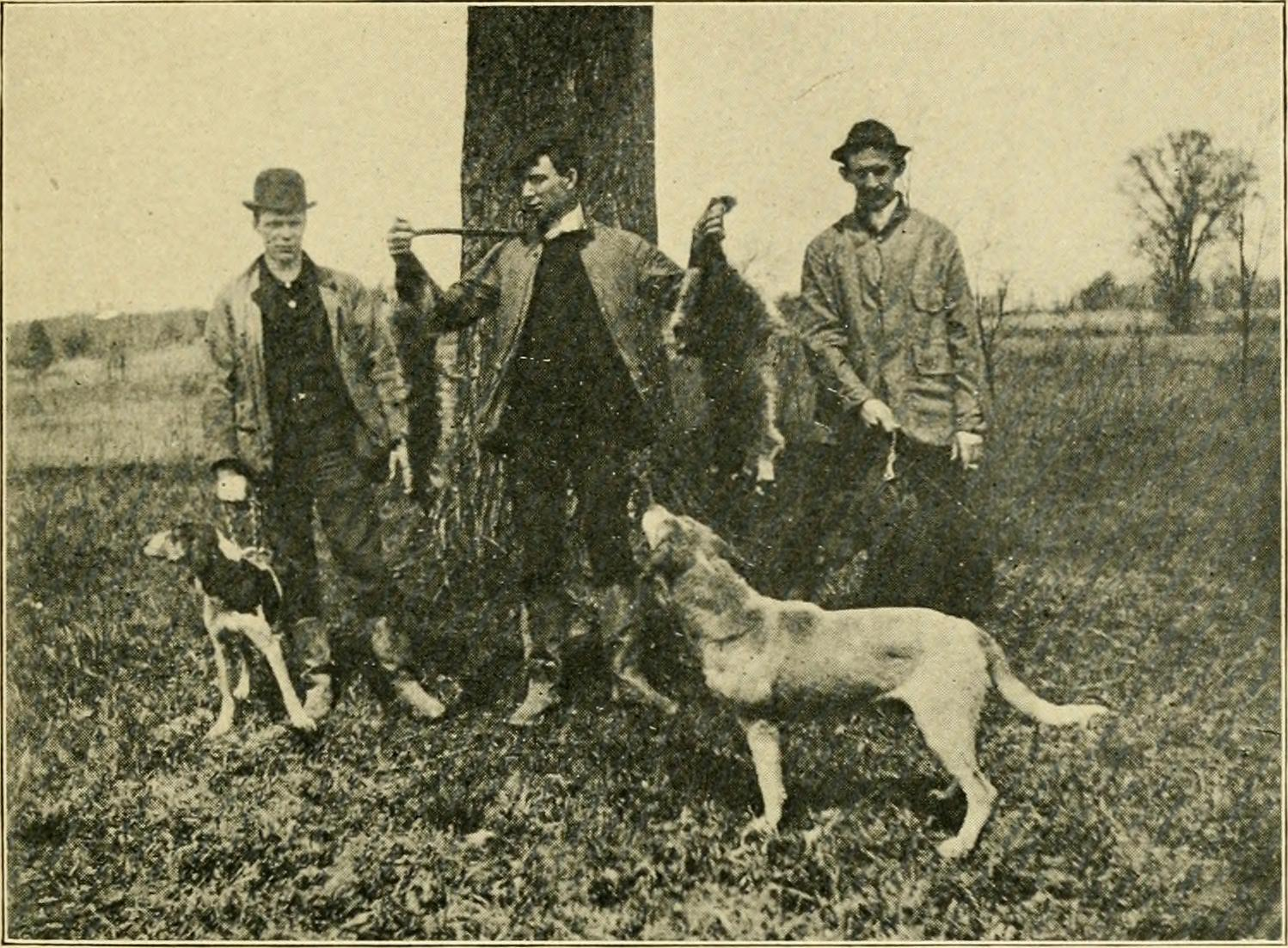
- Coon hunters in Virginia, circa 1907
- Nicknames: Raccoon hunting
- Registered players: Yes

Characteristics
- Mixed-sex: Yes
- Type: Hunting
- Equipment: Coonhound
- Venue: Grand American; Autumn Oaks; Leafy Oaks

Presence
- Country or region: United States

Coon hunting is the practice of hunting raccoons, most often for their meat and fur. It is almost always done with specially bred dogs called coonhounds, of which there are six breeds, and is most commonly associated with rural life in the Southern United States. Coon hunting is also popular in the rural Midwest. Most coon hunts take place at night, with the dogs being turned loose, trailing and putting the raccoon up a tree without human assistance. Once the raccoon is in the tree, with the dog at the base, it is referred to as "treed", with "treeing" being the active verb form.

In addition to meat or fur hunts, there are also competition hunts to demonstrate the speed and skill of the dog. In these the raccoons are not killed, but are treed and released. Some of the largest competition hunts are the Grand American, Autumn Oaks, and Leafy Oaks. Coon hunting has been recorded in such books as Where the Red Fern Grows and popularized in stories and songs recorded by Jerry Clower, Jimmy Martin and others. In Alabama, there is a cemetery specifically for the burial of coon dogs.

== Training ==
Coonhound puppies typically start their hunting training at less than six months of age. The dog's owner or trainer will begin by teaching it to follow the scent of a raccoon's pelt or commercial scent stick dragged across the ground.

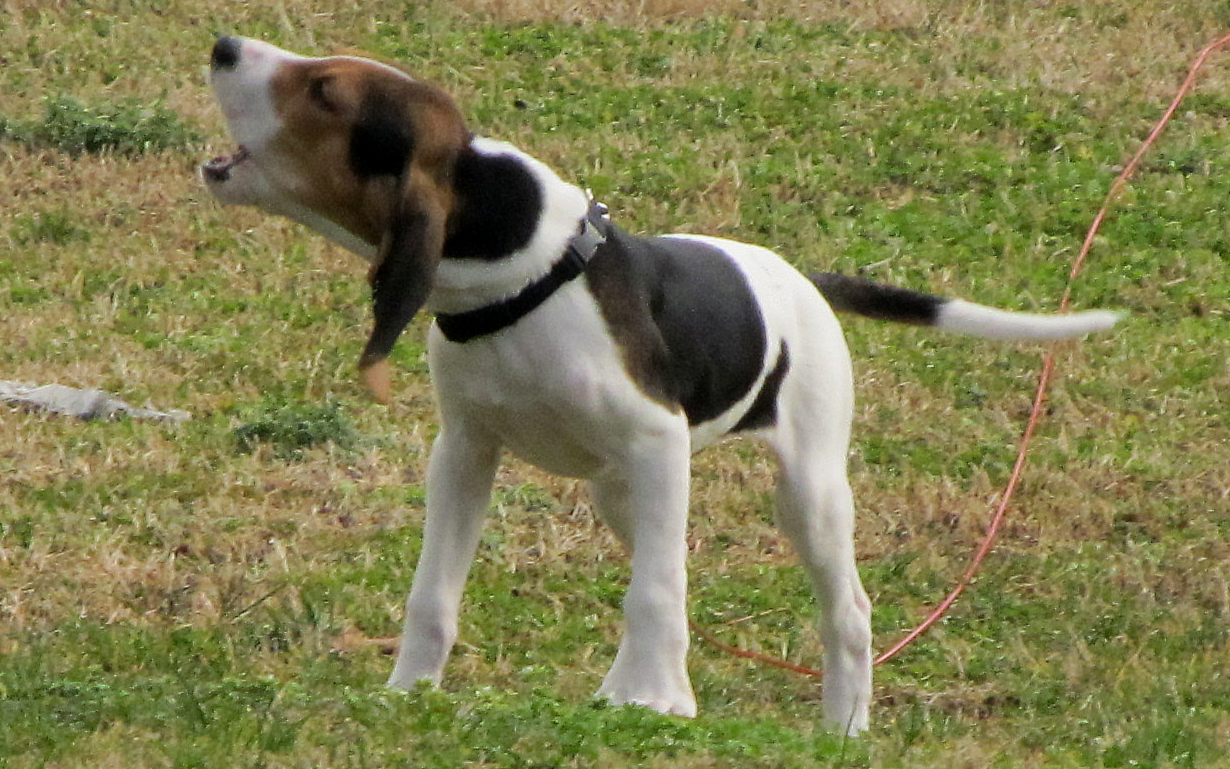
A Treeing Walker Coonhound puppy

After the young dog has mastered this, it is taken hunting, either by itself or with other dogs. Many dog trainers prefer hunting older dogs alongside a younger one, with the reasoning that they will set an example for the inexperienced dog. Experienced dog trainers note that the most difficult part is often not teaching the dog to hunt raccoons but teaching it to ignore other animals such as opossums, whitetail deer and rabbits, which are colloquially called "trash".

== Practice ==
Modern coon hunting is practiced with the use of a trained dog or pigs. While historically coon hunting dogs were of any breed, modern coon dogs are almost always members of the scenthound subgroup called coonhounds. There are six distinct breeds of coonhound developed specifically to hunt climbing game by scent; Black and Tan Coonhound, Redbone Coonhound, Bluetick Coonhound, English Coonhound, Treeing Walker Coonhound, and Plott Hound. The breeds vary somewhat in size, though color is the largest obvious difference. All but the Plott Hound descend from the English Coonhound.

A major difference in hunting performance is whether a dog is hot-nosed, meaning it will skip an older scent to follow a fresher one, or cold-nosed, meaning it will follow an older scent. Of the six coonhound breeds, the hot-nosed Treeing Walker Coonhound is the most popular. Some hunters also use Louisiana Catahoula Leopard Dogs, although this breed is not a hound but a cur.

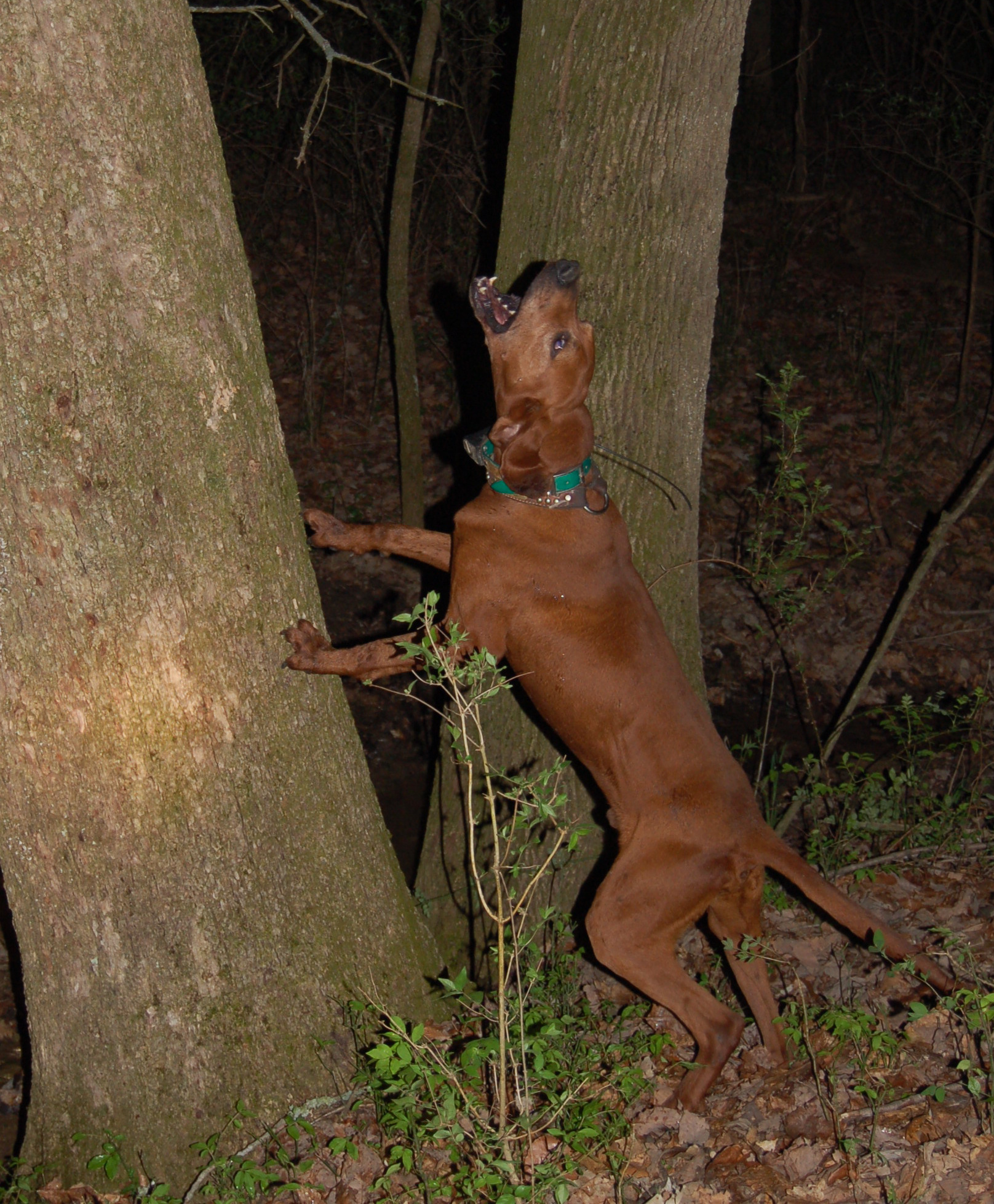
A Redbone Coonhound treeing a raccoon at night

The dog or dogs are released at night in an area where raccoons are likely to be, such as a forest, crop field or swamp, and allowed to find a raccoon scent. Most dogs will emit a long, distinct bay upon striking a trail, and will continue to bay the entire time they are tracking the raccoon. The dog's voice may change timbre depending on how fresh or "hot" a scent is. Unlike some breeds of hunting dog that use sight to locate their prey, coonhounds use their sense of smell alone. The hunt typically ends when the raccoon climbs a tree. Upon reaching the tree, the dog or dogs will stop baying and begin the "tree" bark, also referred to as the chop bark for its short, sharp sound. This change in vocalization lets the hunter know when a raccoon is treed. Some dogs have emitted as many as 150 chop barks per minute when on a tree. The dog is thus said to be treeing, and the raccoon is considered treed.

The human hunter may either follow the dog as it hunts, or remain in one place and only go after the dog once it has treed. Tracking collars with built-in global positioning systems may be used to help locate the dog, though historically the dog's voice was used as a locator. Following the dog to the tree is often done on foot, although some hunters use mules or horses, and some utilize all-terrain vehicles. Horses and mules used for coon hunting typically are able to jump fences "flat-footed" or from a standstill. The hunter dismounts for this procedure, unlike traditional British fox hunting in which part of the sport involves jumping fences at speed. This method has led to a mule show competition called coon jumping.

Regardless of how they choose to travel, hunters typically wear a headlight in order to allow free use of both hands, though years ago flashlights or lanterns were more common. The first coon hunting headlights were carbide lights similar to those used by coal miners, but today headlights are made and sold specifically for hunting. A .22 rifle is the preferred caliber of gun, and boots are highly recommended due to mud and rough terrain.

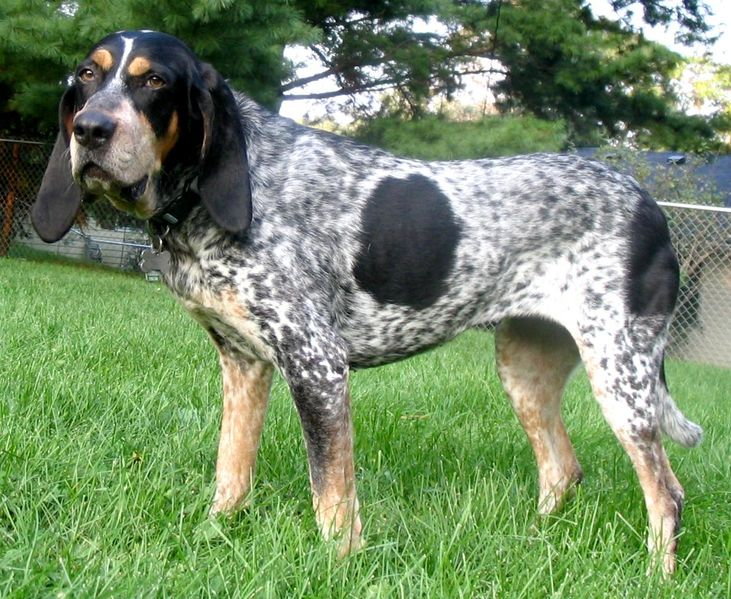
The Bluetick Coonhound is one of six breeds of scenthound specifically bred to hunt raccoons

Not all coon hunting is in the wild, as many modern hunters enter their dogs in competition hunts, also called nite hunts. In 2002 the United Kennel Club (UKC), the largest registry for coonhounds, sanctioned over 6,000 such hunts across the United States. The largest and most prestigious annual hunts, also called field trials, include the Autumn Oaks, Leafy Oaks, and Coonhunting World Championship. All are licensed UKC events.

The Autumn Oaks is held in Richmond, Indiana and attracts competitors from 39 states and Canada. Another large annual hunt is the Grand American Coon Hunt, which has been held in Orangeburg, South Carolina since 1965 and is sanctioned by the American Coon Hunters' Association. It includes a popular bench or conformation show in addition to the hunting competition, and has special events for children who hunt or own coonhounds. In addition to the larger all-breed hunts, the UKC also holds a number of nite hunts each year that are breed-specific, meaning that they are limited to dogs of only one breed. The Southeastern Treeing Walker Conference is an example of this. The American Kennel Club and other kennel clubs also sanction coon hunting competitions.

While killing raccoons is legal during the hunting season, typically September to February, (Note: This is taken from the Tennessee state game laws, as it is not possible to list the game laws of every state, and most of them will change yearly depending on the number of raccoons considered to be surplus by the state conservation officers. The September to February timeline seems to be average.) some hunters merely tree the raccoon and then leave it unharmed. In competitive hunts, where the objective is to demonstrate the skill of the dog, killing or harming the raccoon will often result in disqualification. Hunting for the sport without killing the raccoon, which is equated to catch and release fishing, or chasing raccoons from crop fields is legal year-round.

=== Regulations ===
As with all game animals in the United States, the hunting of raccoons is regulated by wildlife conservation officials in each state and seasons and bag limits will therefore vary. In Tennessee, for example, coon hunting season begins in mid-September and ends in February, with a bag limit of one raccoon per hunter per day, while in Kentucky, it begins in October and ends on the last day of February, with no bag limit. Some states, including Iowa, require a valid trapping or hunting license to train a coonhound to hunt. Inadvertent hunting or running of deer by coonhounds is particularly problematic for hunters, as hunting deer with dogs is illegal in most states.

== History ==
Raccoons were first hunted by Indigenous peoples, who harvested the common animals both for meat and fur. European colonists in North America later also adopted the practice.

While Indigenous hunters did not rely on dogs at first, Europeans utilized them from Colonial times; George Washington is credited with owning some of the first coon hunting dogs, French hounds given to him by the Marquis de Lafayette. Most of the early coon dogs were actually Foxhounds imported from Europe or mixed breeds with hound blood, but these dogs often had trouble finding raccoons when the latter climbed trees, and breeders began to specifically develop dogs for their treeing ability: the ability to follow the scent to the base of a tree and stay there until the hunter came.

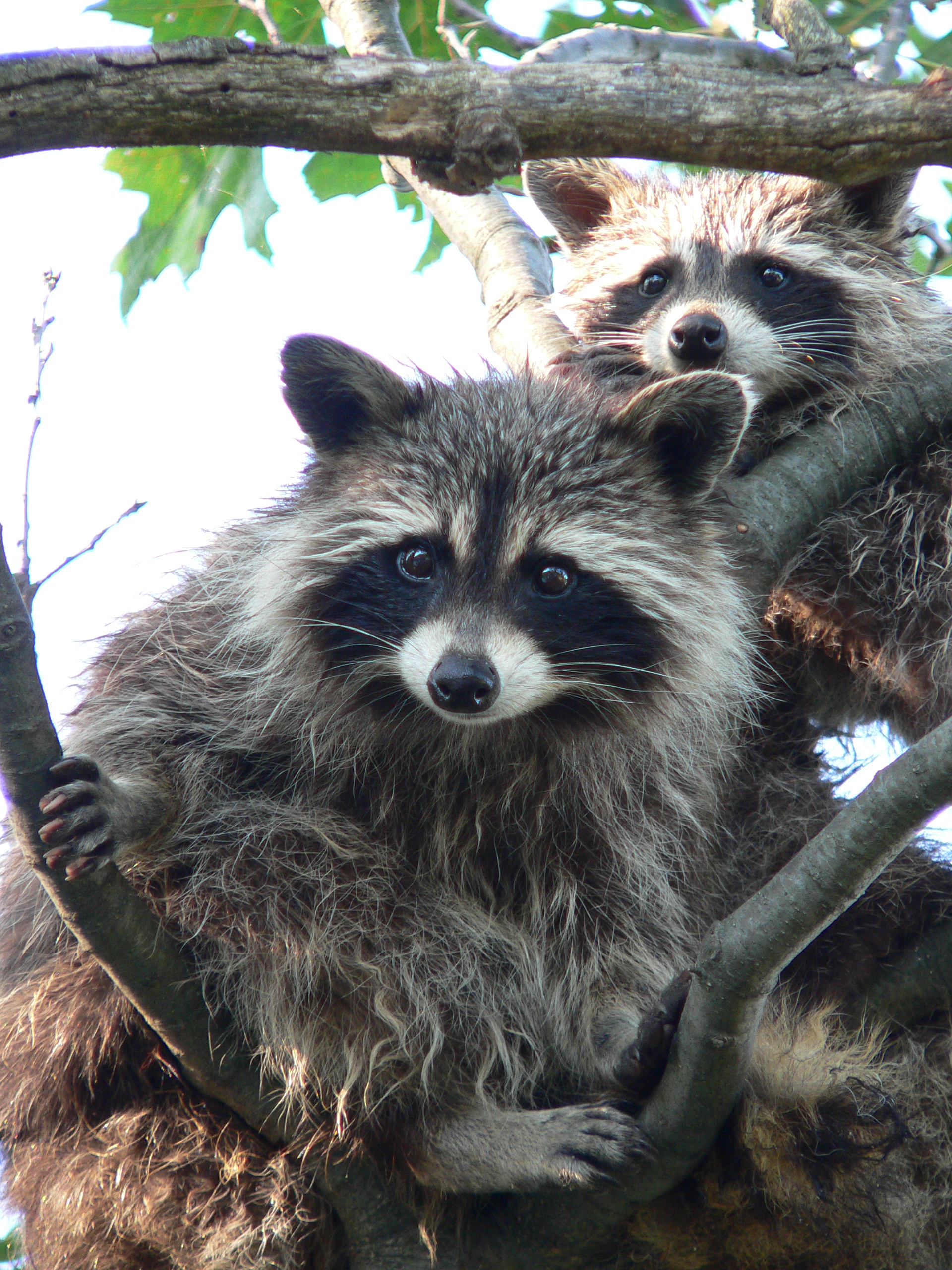
A pair of raccoons in a maple tree

Coonhounds existed as a distinct type by the mid-to-late 1800s. By 1885 a raccoon pelt sold for approximately 25 cents, a fair price for the time. Up to World War I raccoons were very common despite being hunted often, and were sometimes poisoned to keep them from destroying crops.

Raccoon fur car coats were a fashion trend in the 1920s, leading to high pelt prices and an increase in hunting and trapping. During the Great Depression of the 1930s, when many rural families lived in poverty, raccoons were hunted extensively and became relatively rare. Hunters sold the pelts for needed money, and the meat provided protein. In the 1940s and '50s conservation efforts were undertaken, including teaching hunters not to cut down den trees that raccoons used for raising offspring. The raccoon population subsequently expanded, to the point that they became recognized as a least-concern species.

During the 1950s, staged night hunts were created and by the 1970s had become popular, with some hunts involving over one thousand dogs.

In the 1970s, the price of raccoon pelts rose again to a high of 25 to 30 dollars each, and some people made their entire income from coon hunting. It was possible to catch ten raccoons per night in well-populated areas, with good dogs. One outdoors writer estimated that in 1985 there were 30 to 40 thousand coon hunters in Michigan alone. This market hunting largely died out by the late 1980s, and it is estimated that during the fur boom trapping took more raccoons than hunting with dogs.

The practice of coon hunting is sometimes associated with possum hunting, since the same dogs were often used, the animals are both climbers by nature, and are common in the same geographic areas. However, opossums are criticized for being too easy to hunt and too greasy to be edible if killed, and are seldom hunted today.

Coon hunting continues to be popular in the rural South and Midwest. The Indianapolis Star noted in a 2014 article that while some coon hunters are "overalls-clad people from the backwoods", some earn six-figure salaries, and a top coonhound can cost as much as $40,000.

=== Media and culture ===
Published in 1947, Fred Gipson's first novel, Hound-Dog Man, tells the story of two young boys on a coon hunt with a "hound dog man" in 1905 Texas. It was made into a 1959 film starring Fabian Forte and Stuart Whitman, but while the book was successful the movie was a flop.

In 1961 Wilson Rawls published the novel Where the Red Fern Grows, the story of young coon hunter Billy Colman, who lives in the Oklahoma Ozark Mountains with his Redbone Coonhounds, Old Dan and Little Ann. The book was unsuccessfully marketed to adults for several years before being tested at schools, where it became a mainstay. A movie of the same name was made in 1974, starring Beverly Garland, Stewart Peterson and James Whitmore. It was remade in 2003.

Southern comedian and folk storyteller Jerry Clower released his record of "The Coon Hunt", a comic tale of a Mississippi coon hunt gone wrong, in the early 1970s. It became popular almost immediately, launching Clower's career, and remained his best-known work, in addition to bringing over $1 million in sales and ultimately becoming a platinum record for MCA Records.

Country and bluegrass musician Jimmy Martin coon hunted as a hobby and wrote and recorded several songs about his coonhounds. Two of his songs, "Pete, the Best Coon Dog in the State of Tennessee" and "Run Pete Run", which describe the exploits of a "half Black and Tan and half Walker" named Pete, became bluegrass hits. On the latter song, the voice of Martin's coonhound is actually heard.

Dolly Parton's single, "Tennessee Homesick Blues," includes a line referencing coon hunting in her youth.

In addition to fictional portrayals of coon hunting, there are several magazines specifically devoted to the sport, of which two are Coonhound Bloodlines and Full Cry.

=== Other ===
The Key Underwood Coon Dog Memorial Graveyard is a cemetery located in Colbert County, Alabama. Since the 1930s it has been specifically dedicated to burial of coonhounds.

== See also ==
- Bear hunting
- Boar hunting
- Fox hunting
- Wolf hunting
