= Black and Tan Coonhound =

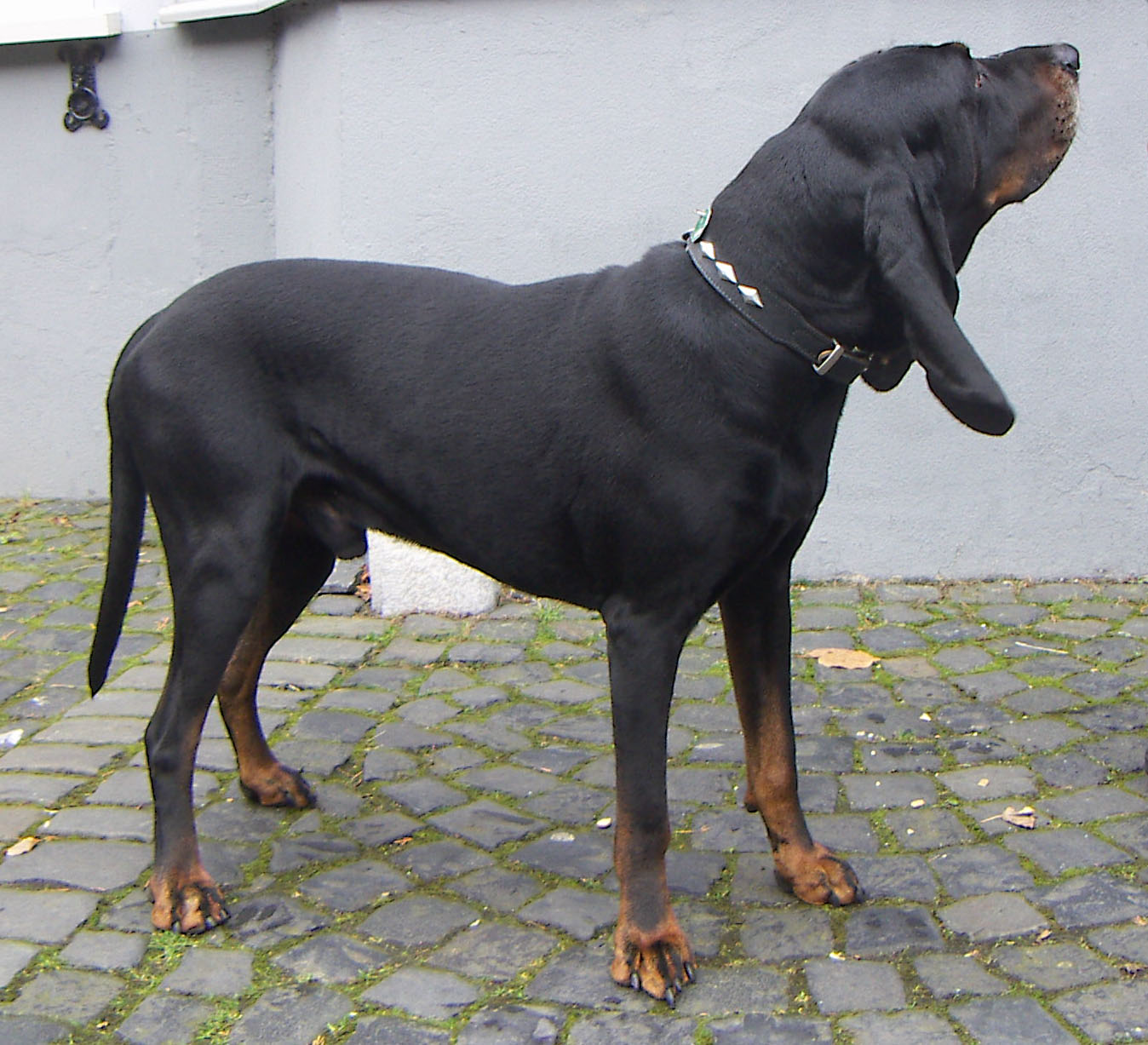
- Other names: American Black and Tan Coonhound
- Origin: United States
Traits
- Height: 21-27 in
| | Males | 21–27 in (53–69 cm) |
| | Females | 21–24 in (53–61 cm) |
- Weight: 40-75 lbs
| | Males | 50–75 lb (23–34 kg) |
| | Females | 40–65 lb (18–29 kg) |
- Coat: Short and dense.
- Colour: Coal black with rich tan markings
Kennel club standards
- United Kennel Club: standard
- Fédération Cynologique Internationale: standard

The Black and Tan Coonhound is a breed of hunting dog. Developed in the United States from crosses between the Bloodhound and the Black and Tan Virginia Foxhound, this scent hound runs its game entirely by scent and is used primarily for raccoon hunting.

== Description ==
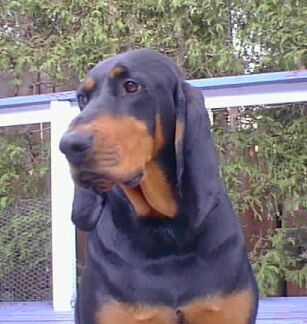
Black and Tan Coonhound

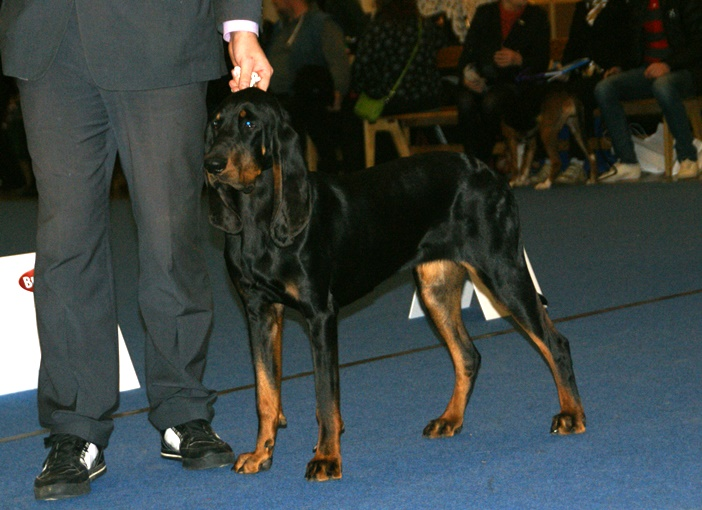
Black and Tan Coonhound

According to the FCI breed standard Black and Tan Coonhound males should be 25–27 inches (64–69 cm) in height with females slightly smaller at 23–25 inches (58–64 cm) although it does not specify a weight range. The United Kennel Club does however include guideline weights of males 50–75 pounds (23–34 kg) with females ranging from 40–65 pounds (18–29 kg). The height proportions quoted by the UKC differ from the FCI and allow males to be 23–27 inches (58–69 cm) and females 21–26 inches (53–66 cm). The coat is short, dense and glossy.

The eyes are hazel to brown, the ears are long, wide, and thin, are set low and far back on the dog's head, and hang well down the neck. The black and tan markings are similar to the Doberman's and the Rottweiler's. The Black and Tan Coonhound's bark is loud and baying; it has been described as a deep howl. The breed standard includes muscular legs that are long in proportion to body length. The tail is set slightly below the natural line of the back. If the dog is alert or excited it carries its tail at a right angle.

=== Temperament ===
The Black and Tan Coonhound makes a suitable pet: it is mellow, amiable, calm, and unobtrusive indoors; outdoors, its strong hunting instinct takes over and it can be difficult to turn it from tracking after it starts trailing. As befitting a dog with its heritage, it is strong, independent, and stubborn. The Black and Tan Coonhound is gentle and tolerant with children, but it may be too independent to satisfy a playful child. It is reserved with strangers and in their presence may bay and howl. The Black and Tan Coonhound can run for miles although it is usually content with a moderate jog or long walk, with an occasional excursion into the field. It can wander if it catches a scent, so a safe area is mandatory.

=== Use ===
The courage of the Coonhound also makes it proficient on the hunt for deer, bear, wolf, cougar and other big game although many US states have restricted the hunting of antlered animals with dogs. However, the primary purpose of the Black and Tan Coonhound is as a raccoon hunting dog. The general impression is that of power, agility and alertness, as well as the ability to cover ground swiftly with powerful rhythmic strides. Each hound has its own distinctive voice which is often recognizable to its owners from a great distance.

=== General care ===
Its coat needs only occasional brushing. Most Coonhounds drool to some extent, and the face may need regular wiping. The ears should also be checked regularly to ensure against ear infections.

=== Health ===
Black and Tan Coonhounds are generally healthy, although there is some risk of hip dysplasia, ear cancer and other ear infections, and eye problems. Litter size is generally eight puppies. Expected longevity is 10–12 years.

== History ==
The Black and Tan Coonhound is descended from the Talbot Hound, found in medieval England after the 11th century. Its ancestry is then traced through the Bloodhound and the Foxhound to the Black and Tan Virginia Foxhound.

In 1945, the Black and Tan Coonhound became the first of the six breeds of coonhounds to be recognized by the American Kennel Club, in the Hound Group. The other breeds, which were not recognized until the 2010s, are the Redbone Coonhound, Plott Hound, Bluetick Coonhound, the American English Coonhound, and the Treeing Walker Coonhound.

== See also ==
- List of dog breeds
