= American Leopard Hound =

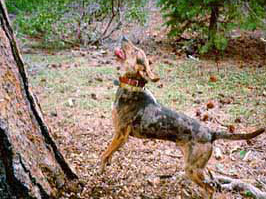
- Origin: United States
Traits
- Height: 21-27 inches
- Weight: 35-75 pounds
- Coat: Short and smooth
- Color: Blue, black, mouse, red, yellow, brindle, with white or other color of spotting
Kennel club standards
- United Kennel Club: standard

The American Leopard Hound is an American breed of hunting dog. It is recognized by the United Kennel Club (UKC) as a scenthound and is in the American Kennel Club's Foundation Stock Service.

== Characteristics ==
The American Leopard Hound is 21 to 27 inches(53-68cm) tall and may weigh from 35 to 75 pounds(15-35kg). It comes in a leopard or spotted pattern and may be red, blue, merle, brindle, black or another color, with white making up less than a third of the coat. The American Leopard Hound has a dense, short coat, medium-length drop ears and may have yellow, brown, or blue eyes. They are hunting dogs. They bark to protect anything around them as well as climb trees to hunt.

== History ==
The American Leopard Hound is thought to be descended from dogs brought to the New World by Spanish conquistadors to Mexico. It was later brought to the United States by settlers who used it to hunt bear. By the early eighteenth century, dogs of this type were established in eastern North Carolina and subsequently spread to Tennessee, Kentucky, Texas and Oklahoma.

By the mid-twentieth century, the breed had declined and relatively few purebred examples remained. J. Richard McDuffie, Leroy E. Smith and A. W. Carter sought surviving dogs to re-establish the breed. In 1960, the American Leopard Cur Breeders Association was formed to preserve and promote it.

It was recognized as the Leopard Cur by the UKC in 1998. The name was changed to American Leopard Hound in 2008. While the American Leopard Hound is not formally recognized by the AKC, it is in their Foundation Stock Service, and has been since 2012.

== Use ==
The American Leopard Hound is used to track and hunt both small and large game, including squirrels, bears and cougars. It works as a treeing dog, following an animal's scent until the quarry takes refuge in a tree, then barking to alert the hunter to its location.

Outside hunting, the breed can participate in activities such as dog agility and scent work.

== See also ==
- List of dog breeds
- Catahoula Leopard Dog
