= Smokey (mascot) =

University of Tennessee sports mascot

- Smokey XII in 2026
- University: University of Tennessee
- Conference: SEC
- Description: Bluetick Coonhound
- First seen: 1953
- Hall of Fame: 2008
- Website: utsports.com/sports/2017/6/14/history-traditions-html.aspx

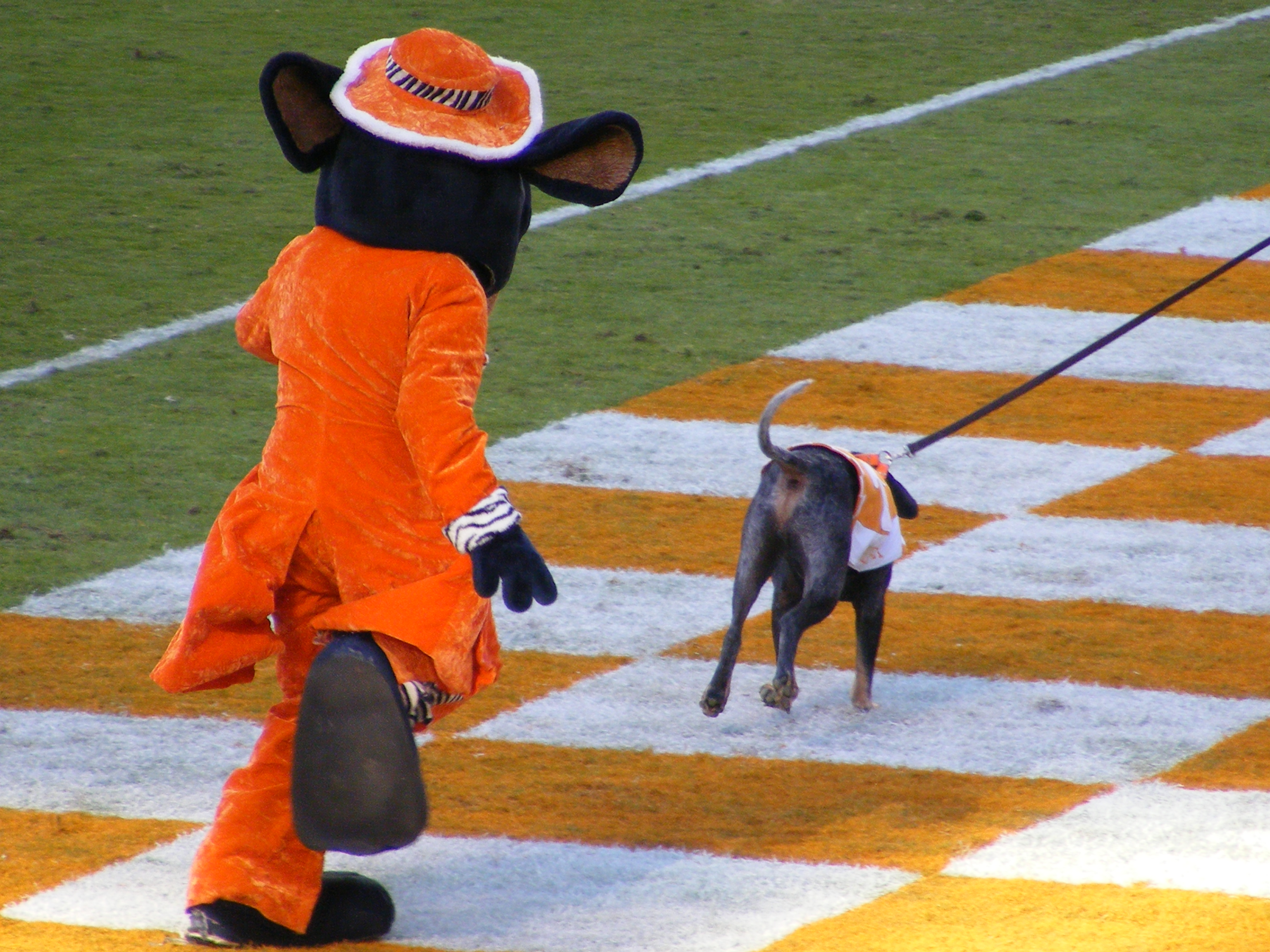
Both Smokeys run in the end zone.

Smokey is the mascot of the University of Tennessee sports teams. These teams, named "The Volunteers" and nicknamed "the Vols", use both a live and a costumed version of Smokey.

There is a Bluetick Coonhound mascot who leads the Vols onto the field for football games. Starting with the 2022 NCAA Division I FBS football season, Smokey XI leads the charge. The Alpha Gamma Rho fraternity cares for the hound on the University of Tennessee campus. There is also a costumed mascot that appears at every Vols game and has won several mascot championships.

== History ==
In 1953, the University of Tennessee Pep Club held a contest to select a coonhound, a breed common in Tennessee, to serve as the school's live mascot. Announcements of the contest in local newspapers read, "This can't be an ordinary hound. He must be a 'Houn' Dog' in the best sense of the word."

The late Rev. W. C. "Bill" Brooks entered his prize-winning bluetick coonhound, "Brooks' Blue Smokey", in the school's contest. At halftime of the Mississippi State game that season, several dogs were lined up on the old cheerleaders' ramp at Shields–Watkins Field for voting. Each dog was introduced over the loudspeaker, and the student body cheered for their favorite. "Blue Smokey" was the last hound introduced. When his name was called, he howled. The students cheered and Smokey threw his head back and howled again. This kept going until the stadium was in an uproar, and the university had found its mascot. "Blue Smokey" would compile a 10-10-1 record during his two seasons as Vols mascot. Tennessee's first mascot met a sudden and tragic end in 1955, as he was fatally struck by a car after escaping from his home.

Dog	Years	Record	Pct.
Blue Smokey	1953–1954	10–10–1	.500
Smokey II	1955–1963	58–39–5	.597
Smokey III	1964–1977	105–39–5	.729
Smokey IV	1978–1979	12–10–1	.545
Smokey V	1980–1983	28–18–1	.608
Smokey VI	1984–1991	67–23–6	.744
Smokey VII	1992–1994	27–9	.750
Smokey VIII	1995–2003	91–22	.805
Smokey IX	2004–2012	62–53	.539
Smokey X	2013–2022	68–56	.548
Smokey XI	2023-2025	27–10	.729

Smokey II ("PR Brooks Blue Smokey II") took over for his father as the Vols' mascot when he was only 3 months old. In 1955, students from the University of Kentucky kidnapped him for eight days, dressing him in a blue and white blanket with a large ‘K’ and parading him around at a Wildcats pep rally. Smokey's captors returned him just before kickoff. A week later, three Vanderbilt students tried the same heist at the Brooks house, but ended up taking an old hunting dog instead. Smokey II was also involved in an incident with the Baylor Bears' live bear mascot Judge at the 1957 Sugar Bowl, with the bear taking a few swats at the hound. In 1963, Smokey died in Lexington shortly after the Vols' game against Kentucky, reportedly because someone fed him a chocolate pie.

Smokey III ("PR Brooks Blue Smokey III") assumed the role of Tennessee mascot on June 18, 1964. He compiled a 105-39-5 record, attended ten bowl games, and presided over two SEC championships during his tenure.

Smokey IV ("PR Blue Smokey Joe") became mascot on September 24, 1973. He compiled a 12-10-1 record with the Vols, but died of cancer on December 4, 1979. Smokey IV never produced offspring before his death, and thus the bloodline was broken.

Smokey V ("PR Blue Smokey V") was the nephew of Smokey IV. He assumed the role of mascot on June 1, 1980, when he was just 12-weeks-old, and he would then outgrow five jackets in one season. His reign came to an end when he was hit by a car.

Smokey VI served as mascot and presided over three SEC championships for Tennessee. His owner, the Rev. Bill Brooks, died during Smokey VI's tenure on September 17, 1986, at the age of 81. Brooks' wife, Mildred, then took over in caring for Smokey. During the 1991 UCLA game, Smokey suffered heat exhaustion in the 100+ degree temperatures and was listed on the Vols injury report until he returned later in the season. A kennel mate named "Woody" took over for him while he recovered. Smokey VI died in late 1991 of brain cancer at 10 years old.

Smokey VII roamed the sidelines for Tennessee from 1992 to 1994. He was forced into early retirement after he nipped at the same UT band member in consecutive games in 1994.

Smokey VIII was the most successful of the live dogs, presiding as mascot as the Vols compiled a record of 91–22, claimed two SEC titles, and won a national championship in 1998. Born on November 10, 1994, Smokey VIII began his reign in 1995 and retired after the 2004 Peach Bowl in Atlanta after being diagnosed with a nasal tumor in December 2003. He underwent radiation treatment and then chemotherapy. The expected prognosis, with treatment was 13 months. Smokey VIII more than doubled that at two years, four months. "He served with distinction, weathered storms, cold and heat", recalled Earl Hudson, who owned the dog since it was two months old. "He came through it all real well and was always rearing to go. He was a great mascot." Smokey VIII died on March 17, 2006, after suffering complications from high blood pressure and kidney disease.

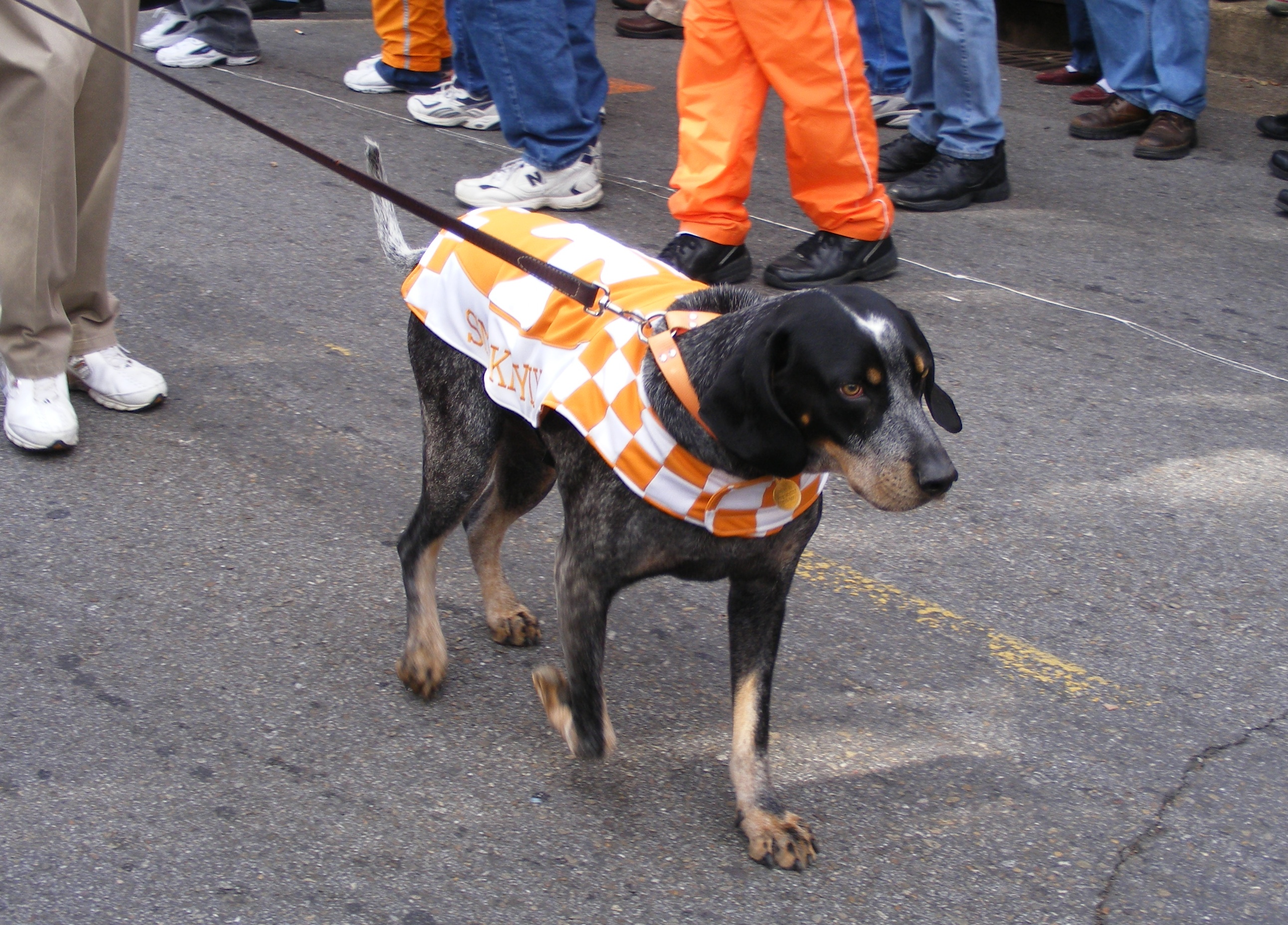
Smokey IX in 2007

Smokey IX began his post at the 2004 Peach Bowl and retired from mascot duties following the 2012 season. This dog was known to be somewhat feisty. In 2006 he bit an Alabama player during pregame warm-ups. An ESPN article said a Crimson Tide receiver fell on the dog when the player jumped out of bounds for a pass. The athlete-dog interaction caused a dust-up among the rivals. Alabama said Smokey bit the player but UT say Smokey only nipped, getting a little of the receiver's uniform but not breaking the man's skin. He also took a nip at one of UT's own: running on the field after halftime of the Vols' game against Georgia State, he nipped backup long snapper Matt Giampapa on the hip. Giampapa wasn't hurt, and it was thought that Smokey may have seen a towel Giampapa had and mistaken for a towel his handlers use as a dog toy.

Smokey X made his debut in 2013. During the week, he lived with the Hudson family. He was the first Smokey not descended from the original Smokey bloodline, but he is the first from a new Tennessee-born and bred bloodline. In 2025, he was diagnosed with a renal cell carcinoma.

Smokey XI trained with Smokey X during the 2022 football season, slated to take over as the full-time mascot in 2023. However, Smokey XI was still acclimating during the 2023 season and Smokey X filled the role for several games. Smokey XI ran through the T for the first time November 25 against Vanderbilt, accompanied by his father Smokey X. On November 24, 2025 the University of Tennessee announced that Smokey XI would retire immediately due to discomfort in public settings.

On game days and while attending to official mascot duties, Smokey is handled by members of UT's Alpha Gamma Rho fraternity.

Additionally, in 2012, the University of Tennessee Press published a book about Smokey's history, written by Tennessee sports historian Tom Mattingly and Smokey's owner, Earl Hudson (the brother-in-law of Rev. Brooks, the original owner of Smokey).

== Costumed Smokey ==
The costumed version of Smokey made his debut in the 1980s. Until the late 1980s, this costume was designed as a cartoon-like orange and white dog that would occasionally wear a white cowboy hat. This version of Smokey would often drink orange juice out of a bottle to cool down, mostly because of the color of the drink.

Tennessee attempted to create a more realistic looking hound costume in 1982, but the result was panned by the students and this iteration of Smokey was quickly retired. The orange Smokey reigned until 1988, when the university tried once more to redesign Smokey. Smokey's new, more realistic look initially garnered mixed reactions from the Volunteer fanbase, but the redesign quickly became a fan favorite and remains the face of Tennessee athletics to this day. The costumed Smokey's body is black, leading to occasional misidentification as the more familiar Black and Tan Coonhound. However, his white blaze firmly identifies him as a Bluetick Coonhound. He typically wears a Tennessee jersey bearing the number "00".

In 2006, Smokey made it to the quarterfinals of the Capital One Mascot Challenge, also making several appearances in Capital One commercials. He is a perennial favorite when he competes in national mascot competitions, and he was inducted into the Mascot Hall of Fame in 2008.

Smokey is occasionally joined by a female counterpart that appears at the women's athletic events. He is joined at most events by his six-year-old little brother, Junior Smokey, who serves as the "kiddie" mascot. Junior typically wears a jersey with the number "1/2" on it. In 2015, Junior Smokey was named "Mascot of the Year" at the World Dog Awards in Los Angeles.

== See also ==
- List of individual dogs
