= Treed =

Treed usually means:

- covered in trees
- chased up a tree, see treeing

Treed may also refer to:

- "Treed", a title of the English-language version of "True Love Awakens: The Makai Tree's Secret", an episode of Sailor Moon R
- Treed, a play by Hal Corley

== See also ==
- Treed Murray, a 2001 Canadian film
