= The Hunt (The Twilight Zone) =

- The Twilight Zone episode
- Episode no.: Season 3 Episode 19
- Directed by: Harold D. Schuster
- Written by: Earl Hamner Jr.
- Production code: 4810
- Original air date: January 26, 1962

Guest appearances
- Arthur Hunnicutt; Jeanette Nolan; Charles Seel; Robert Foulk

Episode chronology
← Previous "Dead Man's Shoes"	Next → "Showdown with Rance McGrew"
- The Twilight Zone (1959 TV series) (season 3)

"The Hunt" is episode 84 of the American television anthology series The Twilight Zone. It originally aired on January 26, 1962, on CBS.

== Opening narration ==
An old man and a hound-dog named Rip, off for an evening's pleasure in quest of raccoon. Usually, these evenings end with one tired old man, one battle-scarred hound dog, and one or more extremely dead raccoons, but as you may suspect, that will not be the case tonight. These hunters won't be coming home from the hill. They're headed for the backwoods — of The Twilight Zone.

== Plot ==
Hyder Simpson is an elderly mountain man who lives with his wife Rachel and his coon dog Rip in the backwoods. Rachel does not like having the dog indoors, but Rip saved Hyder's life once and Hyder refuses to part with him. Rachel has seen some bad omens recently and warns Hyder not to go raccoon hunting that night. When Rip dives into a pond after a raccoon, Hyder jumps in after him. Only the raccoon comes up out of the water. The next morning, Hyder and Rip wake up next to the pond. When they return home, Hyder finds that Rachel, the preacher, and the neighbors cannot hear or see him, and are tending to the burial of both him and Rip.

Walking along the road, Hyder and Rip encounter an unfamiliar fence and follow it. They come to a gate tended by a man, who explains that Hyder can enter the Elysian Fields of the afterlife. Told that Rip cannot enter and will be taken to a special afterlife for dogs, Hyder angrily declines the offer of entry and decides to keep walking along the "Eternity Road," saying, "Any place that's too high-falutin' for Rip is too fancy for me."

Later, Hyder and Rip stop to rest and are met by a young man, who introduces himself as an angel dispatched to find them and take them to Heaven. When Hyder recounts his previous encounter, the angel tells him that gate is actually the entrance to Hell. The gatekeeper had stopped Rip from entering because Rip would have smelled the brimstone inside and warned Hyder that something was wrong. The angel says, "You see, Mr. Simpson, a man, well, he'll walk right into Hell with both eyes open. But even the Devil can't fool a dog!" As the angel leads Hyder along the Eternity Road toward Heaven, he tells Hyder that a square dance and raccoon hunt are scheduled for that night. He also assures Hyder that Rachel, who will soon be coming along the road, will not be misled into entering Hell.

== Closing narration ==
Travelers to unknown regions would be well advised to take along the family dog. He could just save you from entering the wrong gate. At least, it happened that way once—in a mountainous area of the Twilight Zone.

== Cast ==
- Arthur Hunnicutt as Hyder Simpson
- Jeanette Nolan as Rachel Simpson
- Titus Moede as Wesley Miller
- Orville Sherman as Tillman Miller
- Charles Seel as Reverend Wood
- Robert Foulk as Gatekeeper
- Dexter Dupont as Angel

== Production ==
The plot is based on a 1953 episode of The Kate Smith Hour, "The Hound of Heaven", which was written by Hamner.

== See also ==
- Coon hound
- Key Underwood Coon Dog Memorial Graveyard
- Rainbow Bridge (pets)
- Where the Red Fern Grows, children's novel and two film adaptations.
