= Coonhound =

Type of scenthound

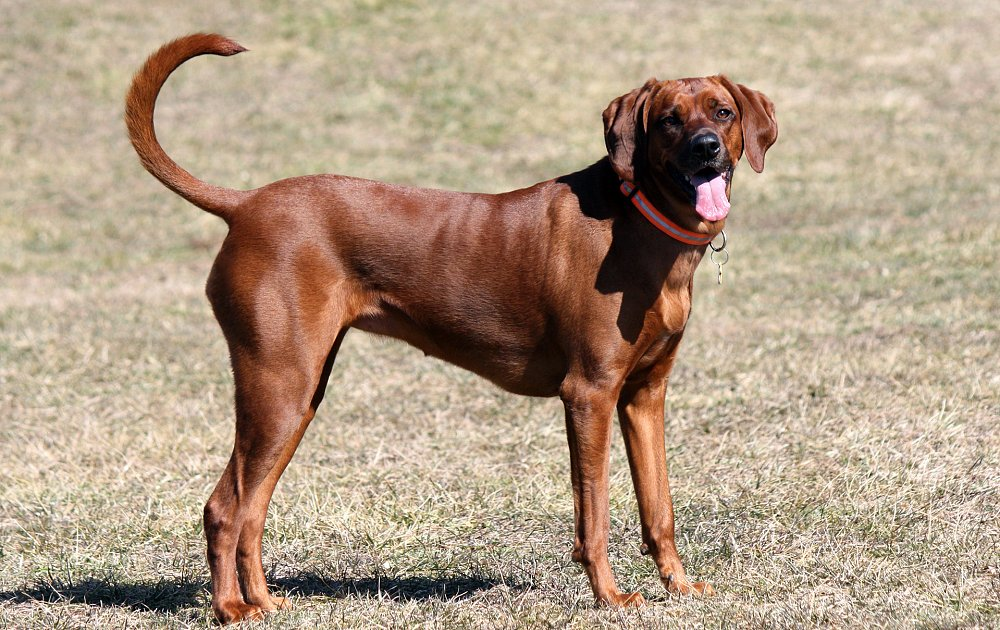
A female Redbone Coonhound

A coonhound, colloquially a coon dog, is a type of scenthound, a member of the hound group. They are an American type of hunting dog developed for the hunting of raccoons and also for feral pigs, bobcats, cougars, and bears. There are six distinct breeds of coonhound.

== History ==
In the colonial period, hounds were imported into North America for the popular sport of fox hunting. Various breeds of foxhounds and other hunting hounds were imported from England, Ireland, and France.

Foxhounds were found to be inadequate for hunting American animals that did not hide near the ground, but instead climbed trees, such as raccoons, opossums, bobcats, and even larger prey like cougars and bears. The dogs were often confused or unable to hold the scent when this occurred, and would mill about. This led to the development of treeing hounds by hunters and dog breeders. Foundation dogs were chosen for a keen sense of smell, the ability to track an animal independent of human commands and, most importantly, to follow an animal both on the ground and when it took to a tree. Bloodhounds specifically were added to many coonhound lines to enhance the ability to track.

Coonhounds can hunt individually or as a pack. Often, hunters do not chase their quarry along with the hounds, unlike organized foxhunting, but wait and listen to the distinctive baying to determine if the prey has been treed. Coonhounds are excellent at hunting all manner of prey if trained properly.

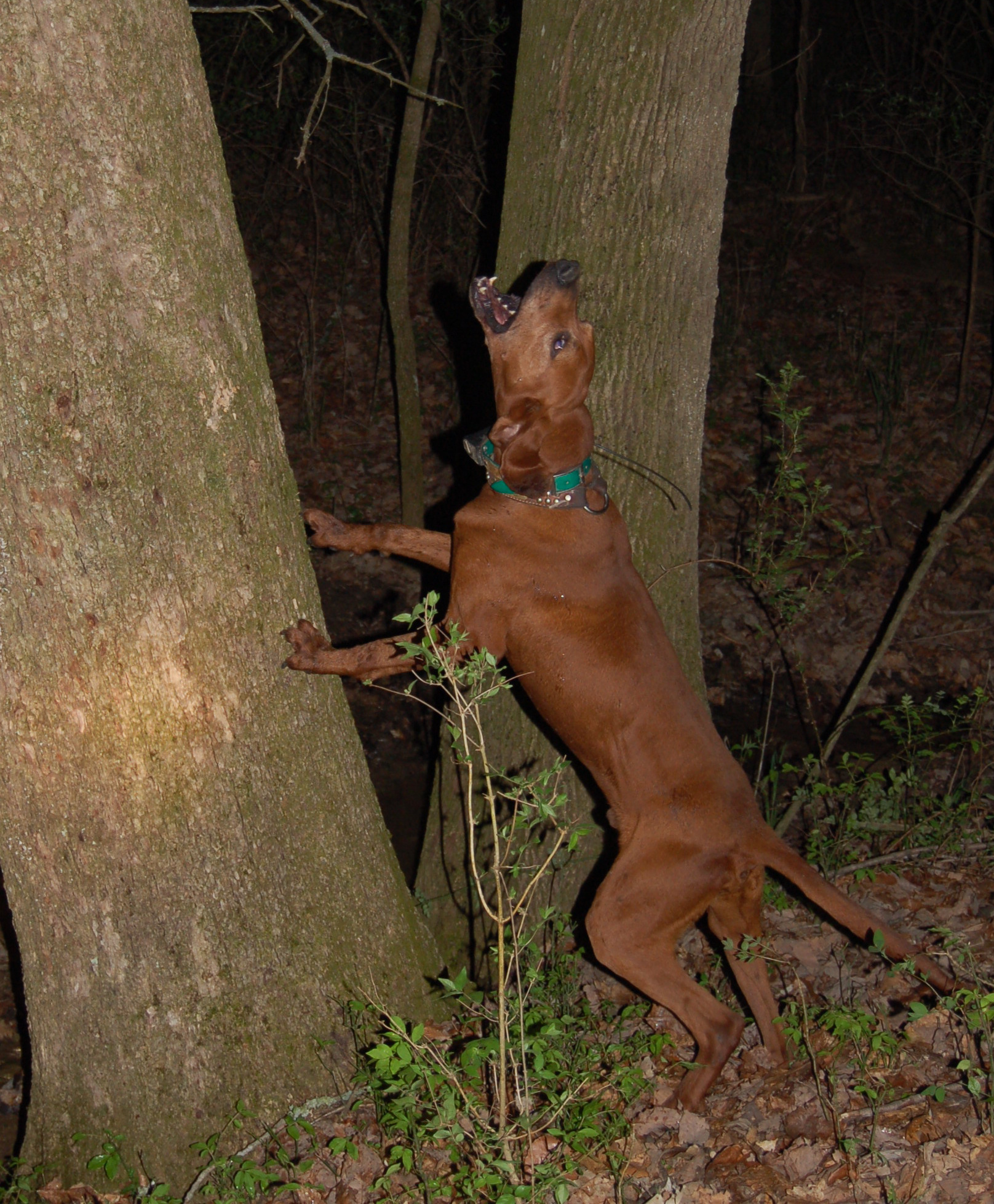
Coonhounds were bred for treeing behavior, as exhibited by this Redbone Coonhound.

=== Memorial ===
Established in 1937, the Key Underwood Coon Dog Memorial Graveyard is located in Colbert County, Alabama. It is used specifically for the burial of certified coonhounds.

== Breeds ==
There are six breeds of coonhound, all of which were first recognized by the United Kennel Club:

- The first to be officially registered was the Black and Tan Coonhound in 1900.
- It was followed by the solid red Redbone Coonhound in 1902.
- The third is the English Coonhound, recognized by the UKC in 1905. The English has the widest color variation of the coonhound breeds, coming in redtick, bluetick, and tricolor patterns.
- The Bluetick Coonhound and tricolored Treeing Walker Coonhound were originally considered varieties of the English, but were split off and recognized as different breeds by 1946 and 1945, respectively.
- The Plott Hound, a dark brindle in color, was the last to be recognized, in 1946. It is the only coonhound that does not descend from foxhounds; instead, its ancestry traces back to German boar-hunting dogs.

The Black and Tan Coonhound was the first to be recognized by the American Kennel Club, in 1946. The other coonhound breeds were not able to be AKC-registered until the 2000s; the Redbone and Bluetick Coonhounds were both recognized in 2009, the English in 2011 (as the American English), and the Treeing Walker in 2012.

In 2008, the UKC recognized the American Leopard Hound as a scenthound breed. It is used for hunting raccoons, as well as other game animals.

== Health ==
As a breed that is often used to hunt raccoons, coonhounds are susceptible to "Coonhound paralysis," or more accurately, acute canine idiopathic polyradiculoneuritis (ACIP). This condition is the often result of a dog coming into contact with a raccoon's saliva, typically through a scratch or bite, though some cases do not involve raccoons at all. Despite the name, any breed of dog can contract the disease, but it is more commonly associated with coonhounds due to their use as raccoon hunting dogs. The disease is compared to Guillain-Barre syndrome in humans, resulting in progressive atrophy to leg muscles, starting with the rear legs and moving forward, and in some cases impacting respiratory muscles.

A study of 90,000 dog's patient records found coonhounds to be predisposed to atopy/allergic dermatitis with 8.33% of coonhounds having the condition compared to 1.08% for mixed-breeds.

== See also ==
- List of dog breeds
- The Hunt (The Twilight Zone)
