= Where the Red Fern Grows (1974 film) =

1974 film by Norman Tokar

- Theatrical release poster
- Directed by: Norman Tokar
- Written by: Douglas C. Stewart; Eleanor Lamb
- Based on: Novel by Wilson Rawls
- Produced by: Lyman Dayton
- Starring: James Whitmore; Beverly Garland; Stewart Petersen; Jack Ging
- Narrated by: Wilson Rawls
- Cinematography: Dean Cundey
- Edited by: Bob Bring
- Music by: Lex de Azevedo
- Production company: Doty-Dayton Productions
- Distributed by: Crown International Pictures
- Release date: June 21, 1974
- Running time: 97 min
- Country: United States
- Language: English
- Box office: $5.85 million (US)

Where the Red Fern Grows is a 1974 drama film directed by Norman Tokar and starring James Whitmore, Beverly Garland, Stewart Petersen and Jack Ging. It is based on the 1961 novel of the same name.

== Plot ==
Twelve-year-old Billy Coleman is obsessed with coon dogs and coon hunting, but good dogs cost money that his family cannot afford. However, he sees several good dogs belonging to others, including a man named Mr. Kyle. One day Billy's father mentions that there's a Bluetick pup for sale at his grandpa's store. Billy runs to see it, only to have the Pritchard boys talk their father into buying it just to spite Billy. Billy's grandpa tells him that if he wants dogs he has to earn them. He begins working multiple jobs and finally earns the fifty dollars two puppies will cost. By that time, the price has dropped by five dollars each. Billy orders the dogs, but they arrive in Tahlequah, Oklahoma 30 miles away, because the mail stage won't carry live animals. Billy sneaks out of the house in the night and travels to Tahlequah. He uses his leftover ten dollars to buy presents for his family; overalls for Papa, dress cloth for Mama and candy for his younger sisters. Billy picks up the pups at the depot and carries them home in a sack. He has to stop overnight and encounters a cougar which snarls at him until he makes a fire to scare it off.

The next day Billy passes a tree with the names Dan and Ann carved inside a heart on the trunk. He names the female puppy Little Ann and the male Old Dan. Once Billy gets the puppies home he sets out to train them to be the best dogs in the Ozarks, using a coonskin to teach them to scent trail. On the night of Billy's first hunt, the dogs go after a coon almost immediately but the coon foils them by crossing the river. Billy catches up with the dogs and tells them he is ashamed of them. He forces them to swim the river and pick up the track on the other bank. The dogs tree the coon up an enormous tree, and Billy starts trying to chop it down with his small hatchet even though it seems impossible. Finally he calls on God to help him and a strong wind blows the tree over. Billy's dogs become famous in that part of the country. One day, he runs into the Pritchard boys again down at Grandpa's store. They tell him about a ghost coon that runs on their land and which no dog has ever been able to tree. They then antagonize Billy until he bets them that Dan and Ann can tree the ghost coon. On the hunt, Dan and Ann tree the coon in an old mill. Billy refuses to kill it, saying it deserves to live because it fooled every dog in the country. He and the Pritchards get into a fight. At the same time, the Pritchard dog, Old Blue, gets loose and begins fighting Dan and Ann. Ruben Pritchard pulls Billy's hatchet out of his belt and runs toward the dogs. Billy trips him, and Ruben falls on the hatchet and dies. After Ruben's funeral, Billy tells his family he is never going hunting again. A few days later, Grandpa invites the whole family over to Sunday dinner. At the dinner, he tells them about a championship coonhunt that will be held soon and convinces Billy to enter. At the coonhunt, Billy wins the right to hunt in the championship round, along with two other hunters, one of whom is Mr. Kyle and his pair of Treeing Walker Coonhounds.

On the final night of the coonhunt, a thunderstorm blows up. Dan and Ann tree one coon and are on the way to another one when Grandpa trips and sprains his ankle. Nobody notices as they chase after the dogs. Dan and Ann have three raccoons up a single tree. Just then, Billy notices that Grandpa is missing. He calls the dogs off the coons, even though Papa tells him it's impossible, and sends them to find Grandpa and they succeed. The next day is the awards ceremony. Mr. Kyle is given the prize, but he gives it to Billy instead, saying that he earned it but not to get too cocky because he and his Walkers were going to whip Billy and his Redbones next year. Not long after the championship hunt, Billy is out hunting with Dan and Ann when they start barking up a cliff. A cougar jumps off and the dogs attack it before it can get to Billy. During the fight, Billy manages to get out his hatchet and kill the cougar, but not before it mortally injures Old Dan. Billy carries Dan home but he dies. They bury him down by the river. After Dan's death, Little Ann loses the will to live and dies on his grave a couple of weeks later from sadness and starvation. Billy buries her beside him. Billy's parents decide to use the prize money from the coonhunt to move the whole family to Tulsa to operate a store. On the day they are leaving, Billy walks down by the river to Dan and Ann's graves. A red fern, which according to Indigenous legend can only be planted by an angel, is growing between the two and Billy calls the family down to see it. Seeing the red fern satisfies Billy that what happened is for the best and he goes to Tulsa with his family.

== Cast ==
- James Whitmore as Grandpa
- Beverly Garland as Mama Coleman
- Jack Ging as Papa Coleman
- Lonny Chapman as Sheriff
- Stewart Petersen as Billy Coleman
- Bill Dunbar as Mr. Kyle
- Marshall Edwards as The Preacher
- Jill Clark as Alice Coleman
- Jeanna Wilson as Sarah Coleman
- Rex Corley as Rubin Pritchard
- John Lindsey as Rainie Pritchard
- Garland McKinney as Mr. Pritchard

== Production ==
The film was produced by Lyman Dayton and filmed on location in Oklahoma, including at the waterfall in what is now Natural Falls State Park.

== Reception ==
Where the Red Fern Grows received generally positive reviews. The Nevada Daily Mail called the film "quite simply a wonderful story".

It was claimed the film had grossed over $5.85 million in the United States.

== Sequel ==
In 1992, a sequel entitled Where the Red Fern Grows: Part Two (alternately titled Where the Red Fern Grows 2: The Homecoming) was released by McCullough Family Media, Inc. and Red Fern II Ltd. In it, Billy, now an adult, returns home as a veteran from World War II, bitter and sad at having lost a leg. His ailing grandfather gives him two new puppies which he is reluctant to accept, but his sister Sarah convinces him to do so, and he names them Old Dan and Little Ann, after his former two dogs. Later, he befriends a neighbor boy named Wilson, and teaches him coon-hunting. The film starred Wilford Brimley as Grandpa, Doug McKeon as Billy, Chad McQueen as Rainie, and Lisa Whelchel as Sarah.

== See also ==
- List of American films of 1974
- Where the Red Fern Grows (2003 film)
