= AKC National Championship =

Major national dog show in the USA

The AKC National Championship is held by the American Kennel Club every year in December or January in the US since 2001. Over 5,000 dogs from all over the world come to compete, but only seven go to best in show.

The 2021 AKC National Championship was livestreamed on AKC.TV on 18-19 December 2021. The show premiered on ABC on 2 January 2021 at 2 p.m. EST.

Its primary sponsor is dog food brand Royal Canin. It used to be sponsored by Eukanuba, but Royal Canin took over as lead sponsor in 2016.

== History ==
The first national championship was held in Orlando, Florida, in 2001. The 2002 show was also in Orlando. The next show was held in 2003 and was in Long Beach, California. The two 2006 shows were held in Tampa, Florida (the show switched from being held in January to being held in December, which explains why there were two shows, and therefore two winners, in 2006).

With 2020 being hosted in Orlando, the championships were held behind closed doors for the first time. In 2020, the Whippet became the first breed to win the title of Best in Show at the AKC National Championship more than once.

== Past champions ==
Best in Show:

Year	Dog	Name	Call Name
2001	Bichon Frise	CH Special Times Just Right!	JR
2002	Kerry Blue Terrier	CH Torums Scarf Michael	Mick
2003	Norfolk Terrier	CH Cracknor Cause Celebre	Coco
2005	Bloodhound	CH Heathers Knock On Wood	Knotty
2006 (Jan)	Alaskan Malamute	CH Nanuke's Snoklassic No Boundaries	Costello
2006 (Dec)	English Springer Spaniel	Felicity's Diamond Jim	James
2007	Sealyham Terrier	Ch. Efbe's Hildago At Goodspice	Charmin
2008	Pointer	CH Cookieland Seasyde Hollyberry	Holly
2009	Scottish Terrier	Ch. Roundtown Mercedes of Maryscot	Sadie
2010	Australian Shepherd	CH Propwash Reckon	Reckon
2011	Standard Poodle	GCH CH Jaset's Satisfaction	London
2012	Wire Fox Terrier	GCH CH Afterall Painting The Sky	Sky
2013	Portuguese Water Dog	GCH CH Claircreek Impression de Matisse	Matisse
2014	Skye Terrier	GCH CH Cragsmoor Good Time Charlie	Charlie
2015	German Shepherd Dog	GCH CH Lockenhaus' Rumor Has It V Kenlyn	Rumor
2016	Puli	GCHB CH Cordmaker Mister Blue Sky	Preston
2017	Spaniel (Cocker) ASCOB	GCHP CH Silverhall Strike Force	Striker
2018	Whippet	GCHP CH Pinnacle Tennessee Whiskey	Whiskey
2019	Pekingese	GCH CH Pequest Wasabi	Wasabi
2020	Whippet	GCHP CH Pinnacle Kentucky Bourbon	Bourbon
2021	Giant Schnauzer	GCHG CH Lagniappe's From The Mountains To The Bayou	Bayou
2022	Bulldog	GCHG Cherokee Legend Encore	Star
2023	Shih Tzu	GCHG CH Hallmark Jolei Out Of This World	Comet
2024	Giant Schnauzer	GCHG Hearthmore’s Wintergreen Mountain RI CGC TKN FITB	Monty
2025	Lhasa Apso	GCHP Ta Sen Westgate Jingle Juice	JJ

== See also ==
- National Dog Show
- Westminster Dog Show
