= Bluetick Coonhound =

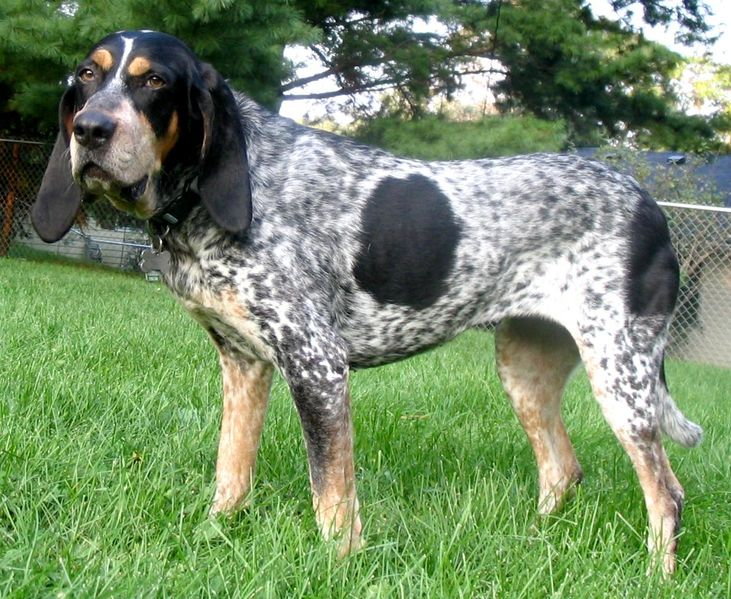
- Bluetick Coonhound
- Origin: United States
Traits
Height	Males	22–27 in (56–69 cm)
	Females	21–25 in (53–64 cm)
Weight	Males	55–80 lb (25–36 kg)
	Females	45–65 lb (20–29 kg)
- Coat: Short and smooth
- Color: Mottled blue
Kennel club standards
- United Kennel Club: standard

The Bluetick Coonhound is a breed of coonhound originating in the United States. The Bluetick Coonhound is known for its friendly personality, cold nose, and deep bawl mouth. It is most commonly used as a raccoon hunting dog, but is also kept as a pet.

== Description ==
=== Appearance ===
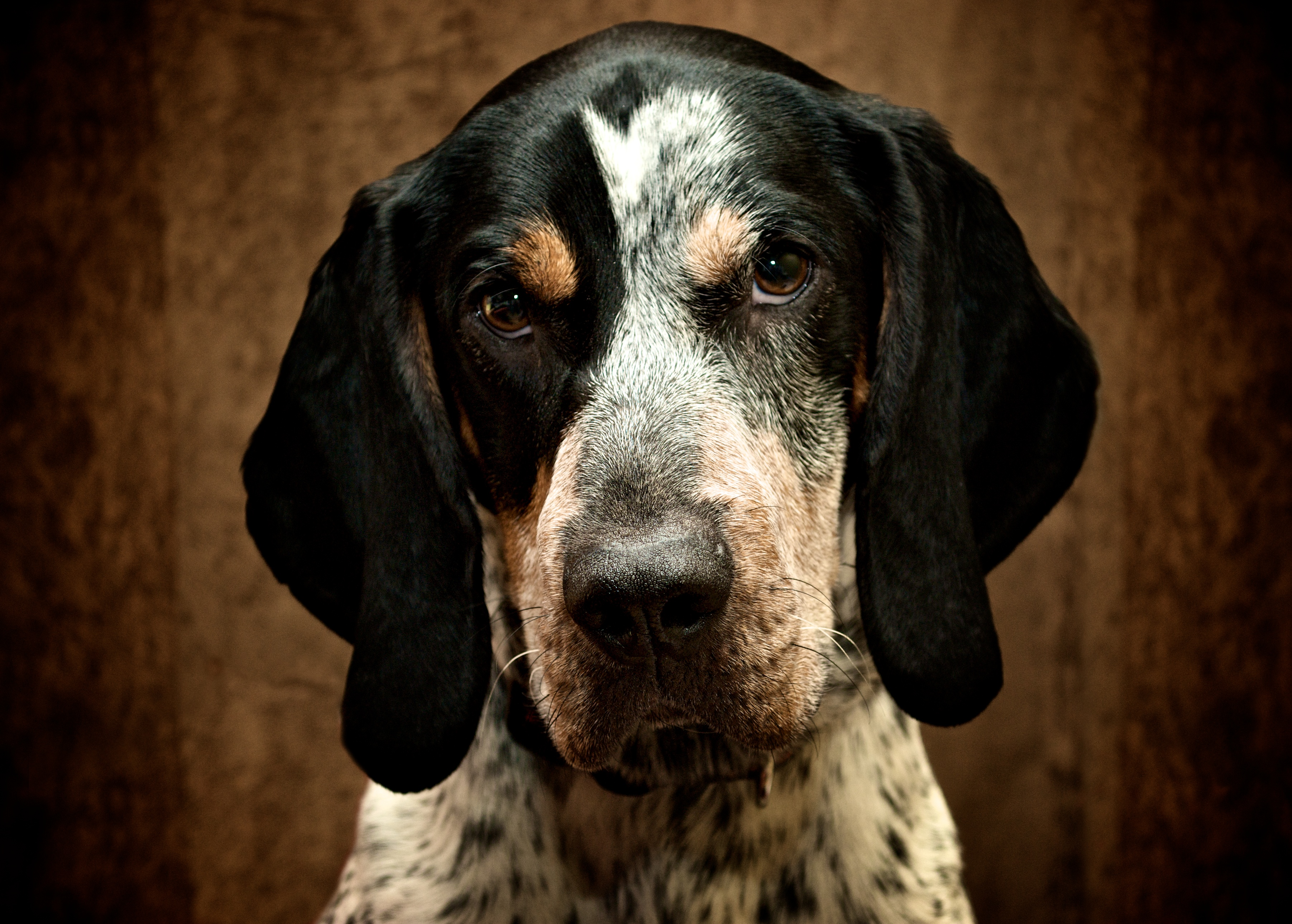
A head shot of a Bluetick Coonhound, showing tan muzzle and blueticked blaze.

The overall build of the Bluetick Coonhound is muscular and speedy. The head is carried up and the tail carried over the back, without signs of fear or nervousness. The Bluetick coat should be moderately coarse and glossy. The Bluetick Coonhound gets its "blue" coloring from black ticking on a white background, which gives the impression of a navy blue color. This ticking covers the body and can be interspersed with variously shaped black spots on the back, ears and sides. Preference runs to more blue than black on the body. Black should predominate on the head and ears. Bluetick Coonhounds can come either with or without markings. With markings means they will have brown markings above the eyes, along both sides of the muzzle, on the chest, and down all of the legs. Without markings means their color consists of only black and white fur. There is generally a ticked blaze running up the face. Bluetick Coonhounds should be 21 inches to 27 inches tall at the shoulder and males weigh approximately 55 to 80 pounds (25 to 36 kg). Females are considerably smaller at an average weight of 45 to 65 pounds. Feet should be cat-like, rounded with well-arched toes. Their paws are larger than those of nearly all other breeds of dogs. Rear legs should have a moderate bend at the hocks. All legs should be straight from the dog's body to the ground when viewed from the front or rear.

Gascon blues are larger than standard Blueticks, with males a minimum of 27 inches and a maximum of 30 inches, per the American Blue Gascon Hound Association's breed standard.

=== Temperament ===
Bluetick Coonhounds are bred to be hunting dogs. They are athletic, hardy, and need a lot of activity to keep them engaged e.g. hunting. They can be challenging to train but when trained are often highly obedient. Since they are intrinsically hunting dogs, they may need monitoring around cats or other small animals. They are an intelligent breed with a talent for problem-solving.

Once trained, the members of the breed are generally very mindful of their owners. First time pet owners should be aware of is "voice-training" these dogs. Being bred to bay while hunting, they are highly vocal. If properly socialized from a young age, they can be family pets. In normal conditions, the Bluetick Coonhound gets along well with children. They are mindful and friendly dogs. However, their noses will keep them in trouble, so food and garbage should never be left out unattended. The breed is often mistaken for being aggressive as the breed will "greet" strangers with its signature howl and will sniff the subject until satisfied. Usually, this is just the way the breed gets to know its subjects. Since Blueticks are driven by their strong sense of smell, they make excellent hunting/tracking dogs. If allowed, they will tree almost any animal smaller than they. Blueticks are generally easier to handle in the field than some other coonhounds.

== History ==
The Bluetick Coonhound, which originated in Louisiana, was developed from the Grand Bleu de Gascogne hound of southwestern France, as well as the English Foxhound, the cur dog, the American Foxhound, and the Black and Tan Virginia Foxhound. Originally, Bluetick Coonhounds were registered in the United Kennel Club under the English Foxhound and Coonhound, but were recognized by the club as a separate breed in 1946. Bluetick Coonhounds are also recognized by the Australian National Kennel Council and the New Zealand Kennel Club. In April 2009, the breed was accepted by the American Kennel Club and in December 2009 they became eligible to compete in AKC coonhound events.

The American Blue Gascon Hound is the name for a subgroup of Bluetick Coonhounds that is larger, heavier and more "houndy" looking than the standard Bluetick. American Blue Gascon Hounds are often referred to as "old-fashioned" Blueticks. This is due to their appearance and "colder" nose, or slower style of tracking, compared to other modern coonhound breeds.

== Famous Bluetick Coonhounds ==
Smokey XII, mascot of the University of Tennessee Volunteers.

- Smokey, the mascot of the University of Tennessee, is a Bluetick Coonhound
- A Bluetick Coonhound named Tet was the companion of Stringfellow Hawke, the main character of the popular 1980s television show Airwolf.
- Old Blue, a Bluetick Coonhound, was in the 1960 Elia Kazan film, Wild River.
- Bando in Homeward Bound II: Lost in San Francisco was played by a Bluetick Coonhound.
- Old Blue was a Bluetick Coonhound belonging to the Pritchard boys in the novel Where the Red Fern Grows by Wilson Rawls.
- A female Bluetick Coonhound is in the George Jones song "Ol' Red" which was later covered by Blake Shelton.
- Huckleberry Hound is a Bluetick.
- Savage Sam, the sequel to Old Yeller, is about a Bluetick Coonhound.
- Lillian's dog, Gideon, is a Bluetick Coonhound in the song "Red Dirt Girl" written by Emmylou Harris.
- A Bluetick Coonhound is referenced in the song "Long Haired Country Boy" written by Charlie Daniels.
- A Bluetick Coonhound is referred to in the 2016 song "Church Bells," written by Zach Crowell, Brett James and Hillary Lindsey, and sung by Carrie Underwood.
- A Bluetick Coonhound named Nash is mentioned in the song "Sun Shines on a Dreamer" by Wade Bowen.
- A Bluetick Coonhound is referenced in the song "Rednecker" written and performed by Hardy.
- A Bluetick Coonhound, or "bluetick hound," is referenced in the 2020 single "I Love My Country" performed by Florida Georgia Line.
- In the small town of Rabbit Hash, Kentucky, is the dog mayor Boone, elected November 2024, who is a Bluetick.
- A Bluetick Coonhound named Bluebell comes to live with the Fraser family in Diana Gabaldon's ninth Outlander series novel, Go Tell the Bees That I Am Gone.

== See also ==
- List of dog breeds
