= Plott Hound =

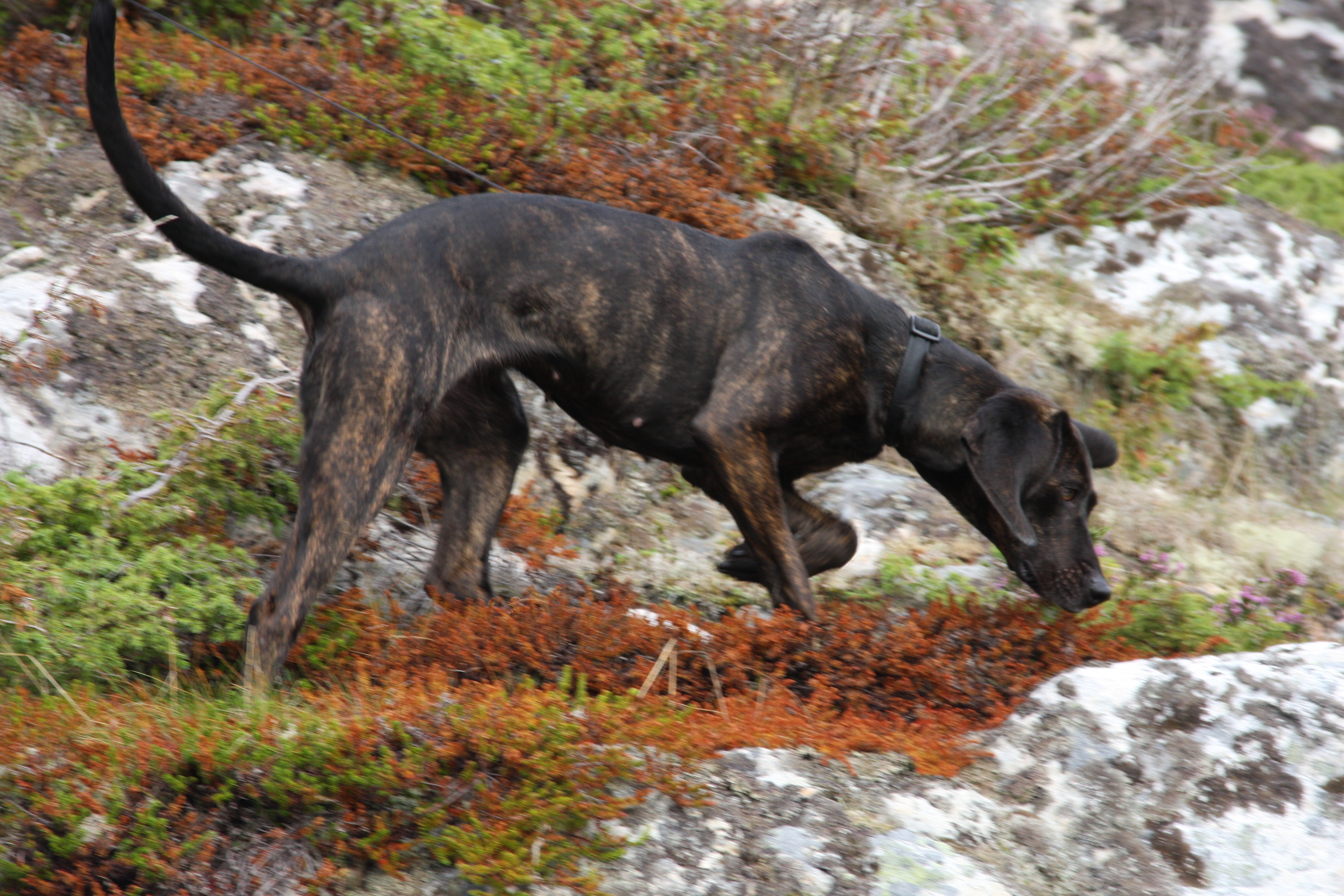
- Other names: Plott; Plotthund
- Origin: United States
Kennel club standards
- United Kennel Club: standard
- Notes: State dog of North Carolina (designated in 1989)

The Plott Hound, often referred to as the Plott, is a large scent hound, originally bred for hunting bears. In 1989, the North Carolina General Assembly designated the Plott Hound as the official State Dog. The Plott Hound was first registered with the United Kennel Club in 1946. Plott Hounds were recognized by the American Kennel Club in 2006 and were exhibited at the Westminster Show in 2008.

Chosen for their tracking and hunting abilities, two Plott Hound puppies have been trained as K9 deputies for the Guilford County Sheriff's Department in North Carolina.

== Appearance ==
The Plott Hound is generally athletic, muscular, and agile in appearance, with a medium build. Unlike some other hounds, the Plott Hound's skin is not baggy. The Plott Hound is a very strongly built yet moderate hound, with a distinct brindle-colored coat. Its appearance suggests the capacity for speed, stamina and endurance. They may have an identification mark on it that is used to identify the dog when hunting. Such a mark is not penalized in conformation shows.

=== Coat and color ===
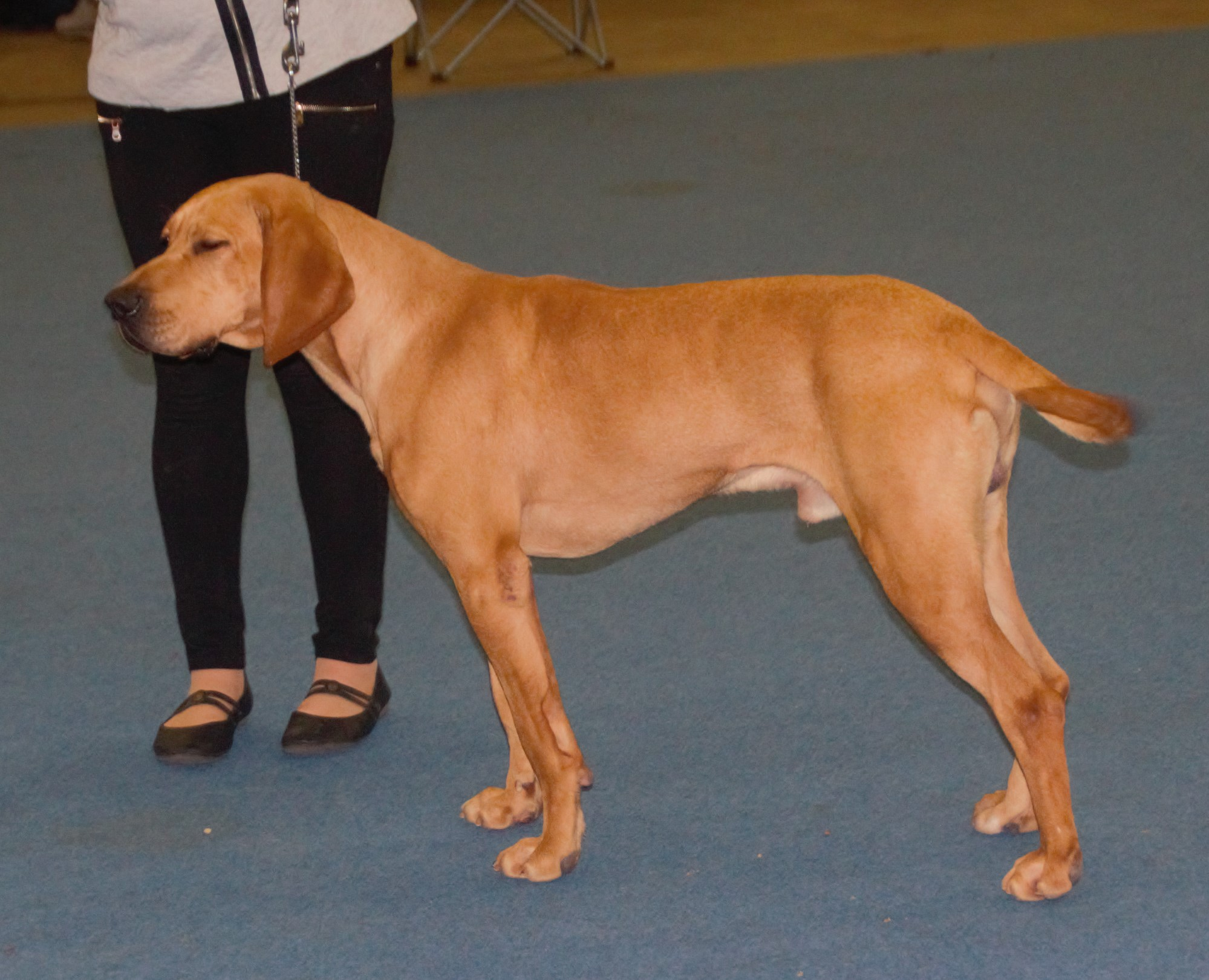
A Plott Hound with a red coat.

The Plott Hound's fur should be fine to medium in texture, short or medium in length, and have a smooth and glossy appearance. According to the National Plott Hound Association, the dog's fur should be brindled. Brindled is defined as "Finely streaked or striped effect or pattern of black or tan fur with fur of a lighter or darker background color. Brindle shades accepted are yellow brindle, red brindle, tan brindle, brown brindle, black brindle, grey brindle, and maltese (slate grey, blue brindle)." Black with brindle trim and solid black are other acceptable alternatives. The Association dictates that while some white on the chest and/or feet is permissible, white found anywhere else is a fault.

=== Size ===
A Plott Hound should measure approximately 20 to 25 in (51 to 64 cm) at the withers for males, 20 to 23 in (51 to 58 cm) for females. Males should weigh 50 to 60 lb (23 to 27 kg). Females should weigh 40 to 55 lb (18 to 25 kg).

== History ==
Of the seven breeds of United Kennel Club (UKC) registered coonhounds, the Plott Hound is the only one that does not trace its ancestry to the foxhound. It is the only breed originating in North Carolina and only one of four breeds originating in the United States.

The Plott Balsams, a mountain range in North Carolina, are named for the Plott family, whose ancestor, (Johannes) George Plott (c. 1733–1815), immigrated to North Carolina in the mid 18th century from Germany, settling in Cabarrus County. The Plott Hound breed of hunting dog is also named for the Plott family.

The ancestors of today's Plott Hounds were used for boar hunting in Germany. Originally from Germany, in 1750 Johannes "George" Plott emigrated to the English colony of North Carolina. He brought a few wild boarhounds (five Hanover Hounds, used for bear and boar hunting) with him. These dogs had been bred for generations for their stamina and gameness. George and his wife Margaret with their family settled in the mountains of western North Carolina, Carrabus County. Though there is no evidence that George Plott ever went to western North Carolina, his son Henry settled Haywood County around 1801 to 1810 (as the census discloses) and was responsible for the Plott Hound's later development.

George Plott supposedly kept his strain entirely pure, making no outcrosses. In 1780, the Plott Hound pack passed into the hands of Henry Plott.

== See also ==
- List of dog breeds

== Bibliography ==
- Strike and Stay: The Story of the Plott Hound, Bob Plott, The History Press, 2007, ASIN: B0061S3YLW, pp. 25– 30
