= Treeing =

Hunting method which uses dogs to force animals to climb up trees

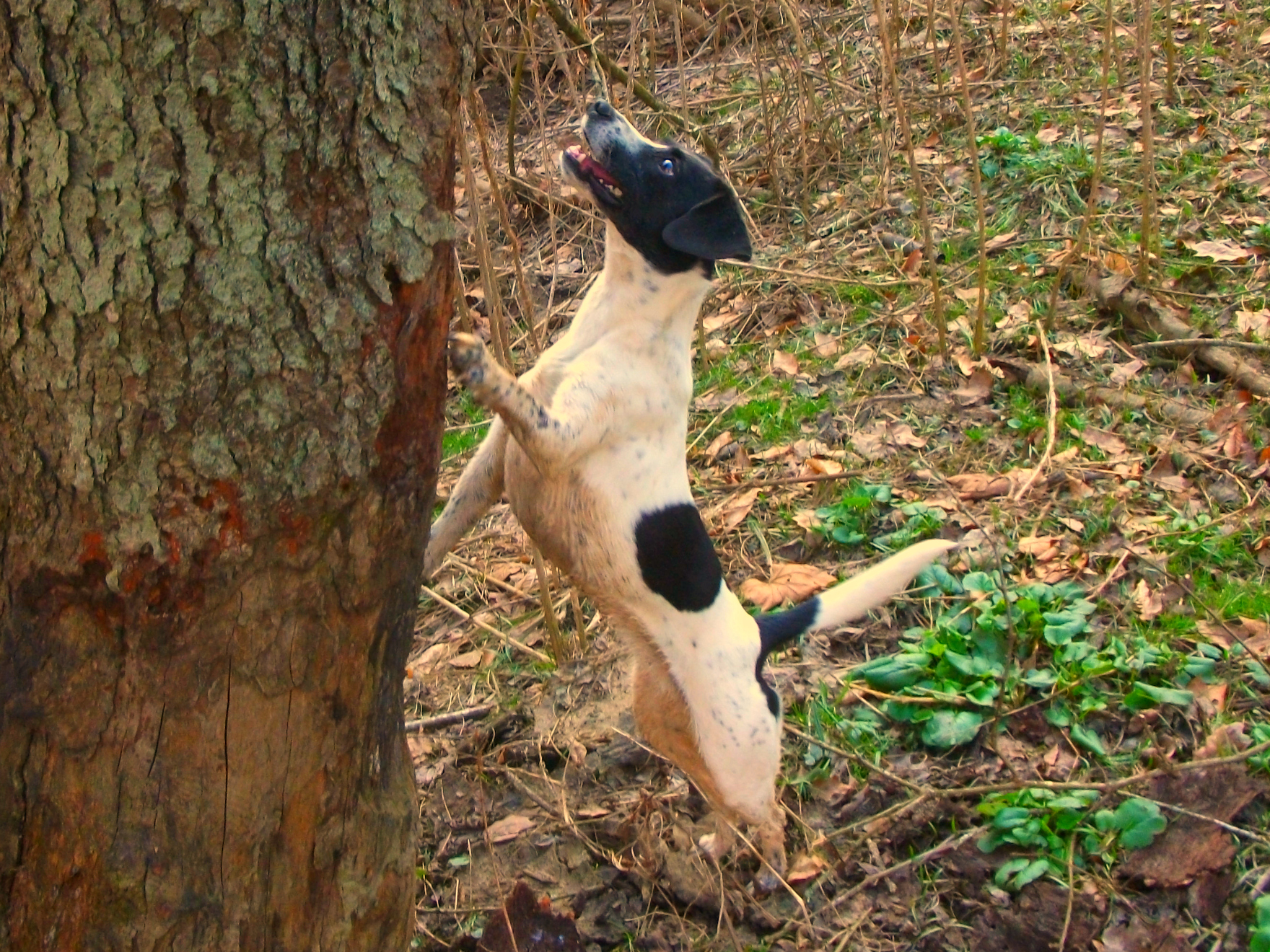
A dog treeing.

Treeing is a method of hunting where dogs are used to force animals that naturally climb up into trees, where they can be assessed or shot by hunters. The idiomatic phrase "Barking up the wrong tree" comes from this practice.

== Description ==
The treeing technique uses dogs to force naturally climbing animals into trees, where they can be assessed or shot by hunters. Treeing enables hunters to see the quarry and decide if the prey should be killed, and if so with a cleaner kill, or spared. For example, females with youths may be left untouched, or quarry may be observed or tagged for research.

== Use ==
=== Hunting ===
Particularly used with coonhunting, treeing dogs are selected for the instinct to not cease barking at an animal after it has escaped into a tree. This method of hunting is also used for cougar and black bear.

The dogs are trained to bay, not directly attack the quarry; however, it is not unheard of for the quarry to kill some of the dogs or for the dogs to kill the quarry. Usually, the quarry will climb a tree to escape the dogs after a period of chase and harassment. Blackmouth Cur use this method. Traditionally, the dogs are followed on foot by hunters listening to their barks.

=== Research ===
Treeing is also sometimes performed without the intention of killing the quarry for scientific purposes (such as radio-tagging) or recreational purposes. It is especially useful for cougars, which are notoriously stealthy and difficult to capture without the aid of dogs.

Research indicates that treeing and freeing predators, a process that is somewhat similar to catch and release fishing, can encourage them to maintain a healthy distance from humans.

== Law ==
Treeing is illegal in several US states, including Montana, New Mexico, Oregon, and Washington.

Treeing is restricted in California, but permits may be sought for treeing mountain lions (cougars), bears, and bobcats in limited times and places.
