= American Kennel Club =

American purebreed dog registry

- Abbreviation: AKC
- Formation: 1884; 142 years ago
- Type: Kennel club
- Headquarters: New York City
- Region served: United States
- Official language: English
- Website: www.akc.org

The American Kennel Club (AKC) is a 501(c)(4) nonprofit registry of purebred dog pedigrees in the United States. In addition to maintaining its pedigree registry, this kennel club also promotes and sanctions events for purebred dogs, including the Westminster Kennel Club Dog Show, an annual event which predates the official forming of the AKC, the National Dog Show and the AKC National Championship. The AKC is a non-member partner with the Fédération Cynologique Internationale. The AKC fully recognizes 205 dog breeds, as of March 2026.

== History ==
In the early 1800s, the English became concerned with the beauty of dogs as well as their function. This fad spread to North America, and in 1877, the Westminster Kennel Club Dog Show began. Soon after, the need for a regulating body became obvious. The National American Kennel Club, which had been founded in 1876, began to publish and make publicly available its studbook in 1879. This organization, however, had more vested interest in field trials than in conformation shows, and eventually changed its name to the National Field Trial Association and stopped hosting conformation shows completely.

In 1884, a group of 13 breed clubs, 10 American clubs and three Canadian clubs founded the American Kennel Club. These 13 clubs pledged "to do everything to advance the study, breeding, exhibiting, running and maintenance of purity of thoroughbred dogs." The AKC differed from The Kennel Club in that individuals could not directly join the AKC; they became members of smaller, individual breed clubs, which were themselves members of the AKC. When arguments began to develop between the American and Canadian breed clubs in 1886, the Canadian clubs pulled out from the organization and established their own kennel club two years later, the Canadian Kennel Club.

In 1894, the American Kennel Club began to refuse to allow Canadian dogs without an American pedigree to participate in its shows, following the prevailing trends in American purebred cattle organizations. In 1906, the U.S. Department of Agriculture ruled that any dogs imported to America who were not registered with the AKC would have to pay a duty charge; this was later changed in 1911, allowing any dog registered with a kennel club in its home country duty-free entry into the country. Soon after the AKC, CKC, and KC produced agreements that made any dog eligible to be registered with the club in its home country, eligible for registration in the remaining two clubs as well. In 1909, the group moved to New York and became incorporated.

On July 1, 2012, the AKC began to recognize certain titles issued by the North American Flyball Association. These titles are Flyball Champion (FDCh), Flyball Master (FM), and the ONYX title.

== Registration ==
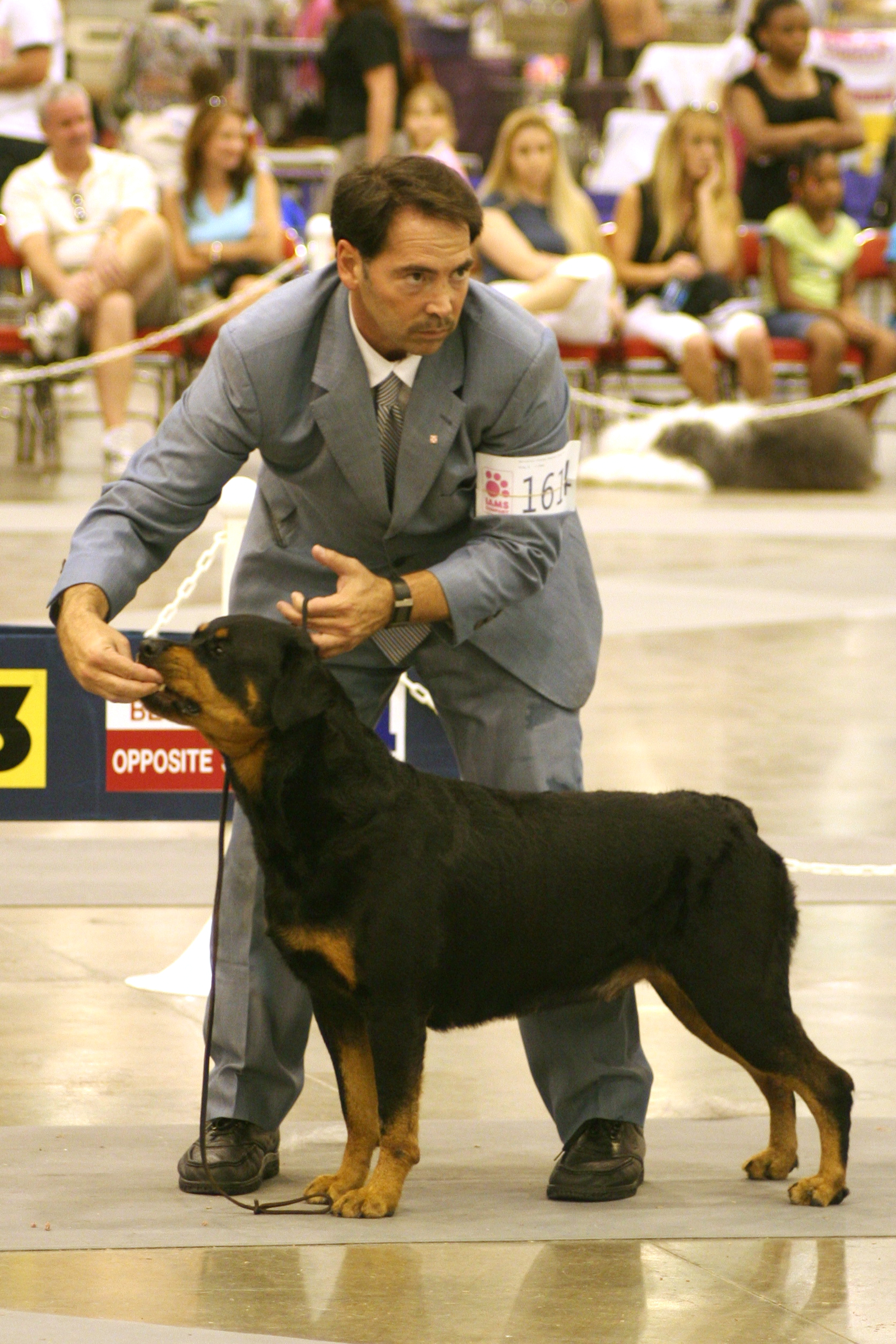
Rottweiler breed competition at the Reliant Arena American Kennel Club World Series Dog Show July 23, 2006.

The AKC is the largest registry of purebred dogs in the U.S. and is the only not-for profit registry, as well as the most well-known and the most influential. For a purebred dog to be registered with the AKC, the dog's parents must be registered with the AKC as the same breed, and the litter in which the dog is born must be registered with the AKC. If the dog's parents are not registered with the AKC or the litter is not registered, an exception may be made if the AKC determines, through special registry research, that the dog is eligible for AKC registration. Once a determination of eligibility is met, either by litter application or registry research, the dog can be registered as purebred by the AKC. Registration indicates only that the dog's parents were registered as one recognized breed; it does not necessarily indicate that the dog comes from healthy or show-quality bloodlines, nor is registration necessarily a reflection on the quality of the breeder or how the puppy was raised.

=== Foundation Stock Service ===
The AKC's Foundation Stock Service is an optional breed registry service the club provides for new purebred dog breeds that have been introduced to the US and are yet to be recognized by the AKC.

== Activities ==
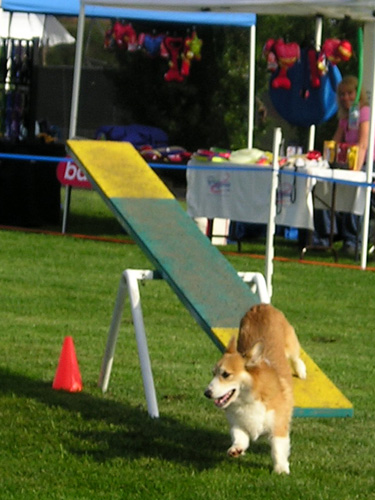
A Pembroke Welsh Corgi participating in dog agility. This particular dog is a multi-titled champion of agility, herding, and obedience.

=== Competition ===
The AKC sanctions events in which dogs and handlers can compete.

Conformation shows

In AKC conformation shows dogs compete in different classes based on breed and sex, with breeds divided into hound, terrier, working, herding, sporting, non-sporting, toy and miscellaneous groups. The AKC's premier conformation shows are the Westminster Dog Show and the AKC National Championship.

Dog agility

The AKC organises dog agility competitions open to all AKC registered dogs over 12-months age.

Obedience trials

The AKC organises obedience trials open to all AKC registered dogs over 6-months age.

Performance dog sports

The AKC organises a variety of field competitions they term performance dog sports, including herding and farm dog trials, scent work trials, earthdog trials, lure coursing trials and field trials for Bassets, Beagles, coonhounds, Dachshunds, pointing dogs, retrievers and spaniels.

=== Other programs ===
The AKC also offers the Canine Good Citizen program. This program tests dogs of any breed (including mixed breed) or type, registered or not, for basic behavior and temperament suitable for appearing in public and living at home.

Another AKC affiliate is AKC Reunite, formerly AKC Companion Animal Recovery (AKC CAR), founded in 1995, which is North America's largest not-for-profit pet ID and recovery service.

Another AKC affiliate is the AKC Humane Fund, which supports breed rescue activities, assists shelters that permit domestic violence victims to bring their pets and educates dog lovers about responsible dog ownership.

The AKC also provides titles for therapy dogs, after the dogs have been certified by AKC recognized therapy dog organizations and have performed a required number of visits.

The AKC also has a program for mixed breed dogs calls Canine Partners. Canine Partners allows owners to register their mixed breed dog to compete in sports and events and receive practical access to pet insurance, AKC Reunite and a complimentary Vet visit through the AKC Veterinary Network.

== Criticism and controversy ==
=== Genetics ===
The AKC has been criticized for the prevalence of genetic disorders in their dogs. As many as 25% of purebred dogs registered by the AKC has at least one hereditary genetic problem. These problems cost breeders and owners almost $1 billion in vet bills and lost revenues from stillborn pups. Some breed clubs, such as the U.S. Border Collie Club, resisted applying for AKC breed acceptance due to fears that doing so would be detrimental to the genetics of the breed they represent.

These genetic issues have resulted in the emergence of "puppy lemon laws" in several U.S. states. These laws protect dog owners from genetic diseases that their breeder may have neglected to inform them of, allowing them to get a refund for the cost of the puppy or to force the breeder to pay their vet bills.

=== Health ===
The AKC supports some canine health research and has run advertising campaigns implying that the AKC is committed to healthy dogs, but the AKC's role in furthering dog health is controversial. Temple Grandin maintains that the AKC's standards only regulate physical appearance, not emotional or behavioral health. According to a statement by the AKC, "There is a widely held belief that 'AKC' or 'AKC papers' guarantee the quality of a dog. This is not the case. AKC is a registry body. A registration certificate ... in no way indicates the quality or state of health of the dog."

The AKC has no health standards for breeding; the only breeding restriction is age (a dog can be no younger than eight months). Though the majority of the 170 breed-specific parent clubs have a health committee devoted to their breed's specific concerns, the AKC prohibits clubs from imposing stricter regulations since the AKC Rules Applying to Registration and Discipline apply to all breed clubs and do not provide an option for breed clubs to extend or override them. Thus, an AKC breed club cannot require a higher breeding age, hip dysplasia ratings, genetic tests for heritable diseases, or any other restrictions. Parent clubs have the power to define the looks of the breed, or the breed standard, and may also restrict participation in non-regular events or classes such as futurities or maturities to only those dogs meeting their defined criteria. These non-regular events can require health testing, DNA sampling, instinct/ability testing, and other outlined requirements as established by the hosting club.

In summary, attention to health among breeders is voluntary and not mandated. By contrast, many dog clubs outside the U.S. do require health tests of breeding dogs. The German Shepherd Club of Germany, for example, requires hip and elbow X-rays in addition to other tests before a dog can be bred. Such breeding restrictions are not allowed in AKC member clubs. As a result, some U.S. breeders have established parallel registries or health databases outside of the AKC; for example, the Berner Garde established such a database in 1995 after genetic diseases reduced the average lifespan of a Bernese Mountain Dog to seven years. By comparison, the Swiss Bernese Mountain Dog Club introduced mandatory hip X-rays in 1971.

For these, and other reasons, a small number of breed clubs have not yet joined the AKC so they can maintain stringent health standards, but, in general, the breeders' desire to show their dogs at AKC shows such as the Westminster Kennel Club Dog Show has won out over these concerns. Concern surrounding the AKC's connections to low-quality breeders has resulted in some dog owners seeking to distance themselves from the organization. In October 2012, Hailey Parker, a longtime Coton de Tulear breeder, filed a lawsuit (that was settled) against the AKC and cited the AKC's connections with high-volume breeders among the reasons. The Coton's "reputation and business model is based on a disassociation from 'puppy mills' and similar commercial breeding operations", according to the complaint.

The club has also been criticized for courting large scale commercial breeders and for lax enforcement of breeding regulations. The AKC employs just nine field inspectors and critics argue that its inspections are ineffective. For example, the owner of a Montana Alaskan Malamute kennel approved by AKC inspectors in 2008 and 2009 was sentenced to five years in prison for animal cruelty in operating that kennel. Similarly, an AKC inspector found a North Carolina kennel "in compliance with AKC's Care Conditions Policy" three months before county officers raided the facility and found the dogs in "poor" condition, suffering from illnesses, injuries and living in "unhealthy conditions", according to court documents. A veterinarian told the court that the rescued dogs had ailments that ranged "from serious to severe" and that "most of the injuries appeared to be chronic, having been in existence for a substantial period of time."

Similarly, the Humane Society of the United States criticized the AKC for not taking a stand against puppy mills. According to the Humane Society's report, "over the past five years, AKC has opposed more than 80 different state bills and local ordinances designed to provide stronger protections for dogs in puppy mills".

The AKC does support several health research initiatives. The AKC Canine Health Foundation funded research that led to the mapping of the canine genome (DNA sequence) with grants totaling more than $2,000,000. Sequencing of the dog genome began in June 2003, funded in large part by the National Human Genome Research Institute (NHGRI) and finished the completed sequence of the entire dog genome at MIT's Broad Institute in 2005. Because people inherit many of the same diseases as dogs, humans can also benefit from health research funded for dogs.

The Orthopedic Foundation for Animals (OFA) and the AKC Canine Health Foundation have established the Canine Health Information Center (CHIC) to encourage health testing by breeders and provide breeders and researchers with information to improve breeding programs. More than 135 different breeds have specific health testing prerequisites required by their parent breed club.

=== Opposition by breed clubs ===
- Cavalier King Charles Spaniel: The Cavalier King Charles Spaniel Club voted to reject AKC recognition in May 2000 due to the incompatibility of the breed club's no-sales-to-pet-stores rule, while the AKC required such sales. The breed club had such a rule to aid in the genetic health of the breed.
- Jack Russell Terrier: In the 1990s, some breeders of Jack Russell Terriers wanted to be included in the AKC, but the Jack Russell Terrier Club of America (JRTCA) opposed the idea on the grounds that the working abilities of the JRT would be compromised by turning it into a show dog with an association dedicated to providing awards and championship status to individual dogs based solely on their conformation. The AKC did accept the JRT into the registry but under the new name Parson Russell Terrier to distinguish the AKC dogs from the JRT working dogs.

=== Lobbying ===
The AKC has lobbied dog-related bills. They are opposed to tightening of laws regarding licensing of trainers.

== See also ==
- List of dog breeds
- List of kennel clubs
- United Kennel Club
- Dogs in the United States
