= United Kennel Club =

Kennel club in the United States

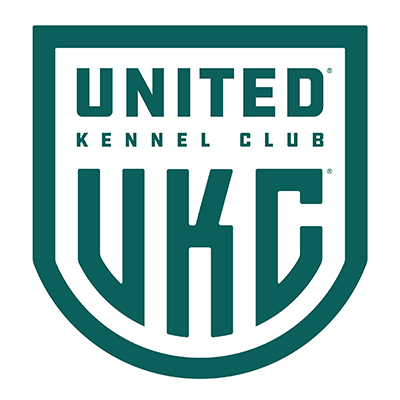
- Abbreviation: UKC
- Formation: 1898; 128 years ago
- Type: Kennel club
- Headquarters: Kalamazoo, Michigan, United States
- Region served: United States
- Official language: English
- Website: www.ukcdogs.com

The United Kennel Club (UKC) is a kennel club founded in 1898 in the United States. In contrast with the American Kennel Club, which is non-profit and which only clubs can join, the United Kennel Club is a profit-making corporation, open to individuals.

The UKC is not recognised by the International Canine Federation.

== History ==
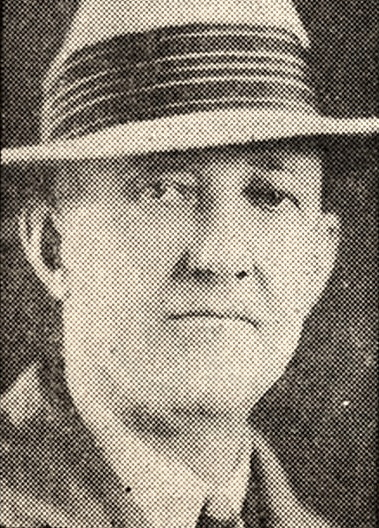
Chauncey Z. Bennett

UKC was founded by Chauncey Z. Bennett, on February 10, 1898, after feeling that other dog registries in existence at the time catered too much to Conformation-only show dog owners or wealthy hobbyists, whom he called "the big city idle rich". Bennett's goal for UKC was to be a registry that recognized a wide range of breeds, as opposed to some of the working dog registries, which only recognized a handful of breeds. He envisioned UKC-registered dogs occupying a wide range of uses, from working, to companionship, to hunting. Bennett found a niche among the owners of working dogs, such as herding and hunting dogs.

The first dog registered with UKC was an American Pit Bull Terrier, Bennett's own dog, named Bennett's Ring. This also made UKC the first registry to recognize the breed.

Starting in 1905, UKC began publishing a journal called Bloodlines, devoted to purebred dogs of all kinds. The journal continued to grow, and in 1974, the journal would split into two distinct magazines. Coonhound Bloodlines would devote itself to the UKC-recognized Coonhound breeds, while Bloodlines, devoted to all breeds, would continue to publish until it was discontinued in 2015. Coonhound Bloodlines continues to this day.

Bennett continued to run UKC out of his home until his death in 1936. Upon his death, The New York Herald Tribune credited Bennett with developing breeds such as "the American Eskimo, the Columbian (white) Collie, the Redbone Coonhound, American Water Spaniel, American (Pit) Bull Terrier, and the American Fox and Coon Hound."

After Bennett's death, his daughter Frances Ruth Bennett took over management of the company, and in 1944, she and husband Dr. Edwin Gould Fuhrman moved operations at UKC into the Hanselman Building in Kalamazoo. Operations would continue there for less than a decade before moving to a new space in Kalamazoo, where they would remain until 1979.

In the early 1970s, the Fuhrmans opted to give up leadership in the company, and in January 1973, UKC announced the sale to businessman Fred Miller, who would take over as president. Miller oversaw a shift to computerization for UKC records in the mid-1970s, and by 1978, UKC was the first known dog registry in the world to computerize all its registration records.

In January 1979, Miller announced that UKC would be moving to what would become their current offices in Kalamazoo, Michigan. The company would occupy the new building in March of that year.

In the 1980s UKC added Obedience as a performance sport, and in 1984, UKC partnered with the newly formed Hunting Retriever Club to create a new format of field trials for hunters. The partnership also saw UKC begin publication on what was at the time a third magazine, Hunting Retriever Magazine, which continues to this day.

In April 1996, UKC became the first All-Breed dog registry to offer a DNA program, which it opened up to dogs from other registries in March 1997.

In March 2000, Miller died, and leadership shifted to vice president and General Manager Wayne Cavanaugh. Cavanaugh continued to digitize and modernize UKC, adding and developing a variety of new performance sports, and launching the company website in April 2008.

In July 2014, with Cavanaugh getting ready to pursue retirement, UKC VP of Operations Tanya Raab was named UKC President. Cavanaugh would continue with the organization until officially retiring in October 2015.

Raab's tenure as president saw the development of a few more performance sports, and the onset of a new hunting sport in the Elite Shed Dog Series. In October 2018, Raab announced that she would be stepping down as president, though she would remain involved with the company in other capacities.

UKC continues to operate out of Kalamazoo, licensing more than 16,000 events every year across the United States. The registry currently recognizes over 370 breeds of dogs. In September 2021, the company announced that it had come to an agreement to acquire American Field Publishing Company, including its Field Dog Stud Book, specializing in upland field trials for pointing dogs and field trial breeding records.

=== Presidents ===
- Chauncey Z. Bennett (founder, and president from 1898 to 1936) initiated the system of numbering the registered dogs. The first dog registered, UKC Number 1, was Bennett's American Pit Bull Terrier, Bennett's Ring.
- Frances Bennett Fuhrman (president from 1936 to 1944), daughter of Chauncey Bennett, improved the editorial content and appearance of the UKC magazine, Bloodlines.
- E. G. Fuhrman (president from 1944 to 1973), husband of Frances Fuhrman and son-in-law to Chauncey Bennett, promoted dog shows and introduced the four types of UKC coonhound events: bench shows, night hunts, field trials, and water races.
- Fred T. Miller (president from 1973 to 2000), took many steps towards modernization, which improved customer service and turnaround time on registration applications.
- Wayne R. Cavanaugh (president from 2000 to 2014), furthered UKC's mission as a proactive and performance-based registry where the health and vitality of each breed were at the forefront of all decisions and advancements. Cavanaugh was chairman of the board from 2014 until his retirement in October 2015.
- Tanya Raab (president from 2014 to 2018), had been with the organization since 1989, and was promoted at the time of Cavanaugh's resignation.
- Jeff Nicholson (president and owner from 2018 to present), took over UKC, according to Michigans Department of Licensing and Regulatory Affairs, and is also the owner of a large development company in Kalamazoo Michigan called PlazaCorp. He is not involved in the day-to-day operations of UKC.

== 'Total Dog' Philosophy ==
UKC stresses the value of what they call the "Total Dog". It refers to a dog which displays "equal parts function, temperament, and structure," and is used to showcase dogs that look as their breed should in Conformation shows, but also are able to excel at performance sports that utilize skills for which they were bred.

UKC awards a Total Dog Award to dogs at All-Breed Sports events which earn a win in Conformation as well as an eligible Performance Sport on the same day, demonstrating both form and function. However, only limited regional qualifiers are offered annually, and those are chosen at whim. Dogs must qualify at a regional qualifier to receive an invite to the national.

== Positions ==
Very early on, UKC began to stake out positions on topics of the day pertaining to dogs and dog law. Beginning in February 1936, the UKC journal Bloodlines ran a regular column discussing the cruelty of the practice of vivisection. The first article referenced the conditions in which the famous Pavlov dogs were kept, as well as other experiments being performed on dogs. This regular column would continue to run through the early 1940s.

UKC also maintains position statements on a variety of topics pertinent to dog law, documenting the company's opposition to Breed Specific Legislation, mandatory spay and neuter laws, blanket anti-tethering laws, and its desire to steer potential dog owners toward purchasing dogs from responsible breeders.

A section of the company website remains devoted to dog law, with tips to get involved, and links to contact lawmakers.

== Programs ==
United Kennel Club's two main programs are called Hunting Operations and All-Breed Sports. Hunting Operations runs six separate types of competitive hunt, generally based on the breed of dog, while All-Breed Sports runs ten different performance sports, that are open to—as the name suggests—all breeds.

=== Hunting Programs ===
==== Coonhounds ====
===== Hunting =====
The first organized Coonhound field trial was held in Marion, Ohio, in 1924. The first unofficial UKC Nite Hunt was held in 1953 in Ingraham, Illinois.

In 1960, UKC held the first Autumn Oaks event, at which the organization crowns a National Grand Nite Champion yearly.

In 1978, UKC launched Coonhound World Championship, to crown a World Nite Hunt Champion. The event continued to grow, and UKC instituted a zone semifinal system in the late 1980s, with qualifying dogs hunting in one of four zones to earn their way to the Finals. In 1992, the number of zones expanded to five. Today, there are seven zones, accommodating hundreds of dogs.

===== Bench Show =====
A Bench Show is essentially a Conformation show for Coonhounds. The dogs are placed on a two-foot high platform to assist the judge in their examination of the dog for adherence to breed standards. The first UKC licensed Bench Show for Coonhounds occurred in 1946, at the National Leafy Oak Field Trial, in Kenton, Ohio. Today, UKC licenses thousands of bench shows a year across the country. The organization also crowns National Bench Show Champions yearly at Autumn Oaks, and a World Bench Show Champion at the yearly Coonhound World Championship event.

==== Beagles ====
Though promoting Beagles in Bloodlines as far back as 1913, the first UKC-licensed Beagle Field Trial did not take place until 1924. In 1988, UKC met with Beaglers across the country to develop the UKC Hunting Beagle format, with the first event taking place in 1990.

Currently, UKC runs the Hunting Beagle Nationals, established in 1992, and the Hunting Beagle World Championship, established in 2000. Both events feature a Hunt and Bench Show portion.

In 2021, UKC paired with the Beagle Gundog Alliance to develop a new format, the Beagle Gundog program. This format held its first national event that same year.

==== Hunting Retrievers ====
In the early 1980s, UKC held a series of meetings with several prominent voices in the Hunting Retriever field, about an arrangement to create a new format of field trial for retrievers. This became the Hunting Retriever Club, which was quickly affiliated with UKC.

In April 1984, the first Hunting Retriever Club and UKC hunt was held in Ruston, Louisiana. The first Grand Hunt, was established in 1986, as dogs quickly reached the title of Hunting Retriever Champion, and had no higher levels to reach. In October 1986, the first Grand Hunt was held, and in the years since, there has been a Grand Hunt every fall and every spring.

With the development of Hunting Retriever Club came a new publication for United Kennel Club, Hunting Retriever Magazine, the first issue of which was published in August 1984.

==== Cur & Feists ====
The UKC Cur & Feist program began in 2000, with the first events being held toward the end of the year. The Cur and Feist breeds are smaller dogs, most often used to hunt squirrel and other small game. Over the two decades of the program's existence, UKC has developed World Championships for both Cur Squirrel Dog and Feist Squirrel Dog, and holds licensed bench shows.

==== Upland Hunting ====
The first UKC-licensed pointing dog trial was held in April 2004, by the French Brittany Gundog Club (which would later become Club de l’Epagneul Breton of the United States or CEB-US). The event was held in Armour, South Dakota and consisted of a conformation show and two distinct field trials. Since that event, UKC has continued to host pointing dog field trials with clubs across the country. In 2021, UKC announced that it had acquired American Field Publishing Company, including the Field Dog Stud Book, the oldest purebred dog registry in the United States.

==== Elite Shed Dog Series ====
The UKC Elite Shed Dog Series was created in 2017, to provide a family-friendly format for those who enjoy participating in the gathering of shed antlers—or shed hunting. The first UKC Elite Shed Dog National event was held in April 2020 in Whittington, Illinois.

=== All-Breed Sports Programs ===
The UKC All-Breed Sports Department operates ten performance sports, as well as the SPOT (Socialized Pet Obedience Test) program.

==== Agility ====
In Agility, a dog and handler race to complete a specially designed obstacle course involving tunnels, bridges, and jumps. The event is timed to measure speed of completion, and accuracy is also taken into consideration.

The first UKC-licensed Agility trial was held in July 1995, after the National Club for Dog Agility transferred the program to United Kennel Club.

==== Conformation ====
Conformation is the official term for a dog show, referring specifically to the external and visible details of a dog's build and structure. The preferred details are written out in each breed's standards, which are published and held by each registry.

UKC began to license Conformation Dog Shows in the 1920s, with the first annual UKC Bench Show held in May 1926.

==== Dock Jumping ====
In Dock Jumping (called Dock Diving in AKC), dogs jump off the end of a standard length dock, usually jumping for distance, though some classes feature high jumps or working to fetch a bumper.

UKC announced Dock Jumping as a licensed event in 2007.

==== Drag Racing ====
Drag Racing features dogs who meet the height requirement, racing in a straight-line course, and in the case of Steeplechase, clearing small hurdles during the run. Flat racing does not include these hurdles.

UKC began to license Drag Racing in 2004, at the time called Terrier Racing.

In April 2014, UKC rechristened the event Drag Racing, opening it up to all breeds 18 inches or under in height.

==== Lure Coursing ====
Lure Coursing features dogs pursuing an artificial lure around a predetermined course. The UKC Lure Coursing rule book lays out 26 breeds which may participate in the regular stakes race, while any breed can participate in a coursing aptitude test. The recommended field size for the race is approximately 200 yards by 300 yards, while the minimum field size is set at 150 yards by 200 yards.

UKC announced the addition of Lure Coursing in May 2010.

==== Nosework ====
Nosework (knows as scentwork in AKC) is modeled after working detection dogs, and challenges dogs to recognize a specific, trained odor, such as birch, anise, clove, myrrh, and vetiver, and then indicate to their handler that they have located that odor in a variety of locations, and elements.

UKC began to officially license Nosework events in 2015.

==== Obedience ====
In Obedience trials, dogs perform a series of exercises at the command of their handler, the complexity of which varies by competition level, from the basics of sit, stay, heel, to more advanced exercises like directed retrieves and following hand signals.

The UKC Obedience Program began in 1977.

==== Precision Coursing ====
In Precision Coursing, dogs of all breeds race the clock as they pursue a lure over a 150-foot track through an enclosed course.

UKC announced the launch of Precision Coursing in May 2020.

==== Rally Obedience ====
Similar to Obedience, Rally Obedience also tests a dog's ability to perform basic obedience exercises, but in Rally, the pace is quicker as the sequence of exercises is indicated by a series of instructional and directional signs placed throughout the course.

UKC announced the addition of Rally Obedience in 2008.

==== SPOT ====
Developed in 2016, the Socialized Pet Obedience Test is designed to help encourage dogs and owners to set an example for responsible dog ownership, by learning appropriate behavior while on-leash and in the presence of other dogs. The SPOT test consists of 10 separate stations. At each station the dog must perform a basic exercise. These exercises are used to demonstrate that the dog is capable of exhibiting desired behaviors that the general public would expect to see in a well-behaved dog.

==== Weight Pull ====
In Weight Pull, dogs are harnessed to a weighted cart or sled and given one minute to pull a predetermined distance of 16 feet. The weight to be pulled is variable based on the weight of the dog itself.

UKC added Weight Pull to its list of events in 2002, with the first event being held in Montana in February 2002.

== UKC championship ==
For the United Kennel Club Championship (UKC Ch), a combination of points (for example, winning the class earns 10 points in non-variety breeds, 5 in variety breeds) and competition wins (including group placements and Best In Show/Reserve Best in Multi-Breed Show) are required. In UKC, a dog must receive 100 points with at least three competition wins under three different judges. A competition win is when a dog wins best male, best female, or best of winners over a least one other dog and receives points accordingly. A UKC Grand Champion (GRCh) title is earned by winning in competition over 2 other Champions and/or Grand Champions of the breed in at least five shows under at least three different judges. In Jan 2019, UKC added 4 Grand Champion levels — Emerald, Ruby, Sapphire and Diamond.

== See also ==
- American Kennel Club
