= Dogs in the United States =

Dogs in the United States have significant popularity and status – they are often treated as family members. Currently, the American Kennel Club is the largest registry of pure breed dogs across the world.

== History ==
Some of the earliest archaeological traces of the existence of dogs in what became the United States can be dated back to 9,000 b.p. Dogs came to America after crossing from Siberia to Alaska, and it was during this period that the domestication of dogs began in America.

A variety of American dog breeds are noted to have been mixed with Spanish and French dog breeds. The European idea of registering dog breeds and breed clubs led to the foundation of Kennel Club in Great Britain in 1873. The American Kennel Club, prevalent in the United States, was highly influenced by this European predecessor. Currently, the American Kennel Club is the largest purebred dog registry, and registers more than 1 million dogs each year. The kennel club also organizes events for purebred dogs.

== In economic activities ==
Dogs in the United States have been involved in activities separate from their role in individual families. Dog racing started in 1919 after the opening of a greyhound track in Emeryville, California, and continues to this day. Gambling on such races often occurs and, while it is usually not formally authorized by law, is technically permitted in eighteen states. Of these eighteen, fifteen currently contain dog tracks.

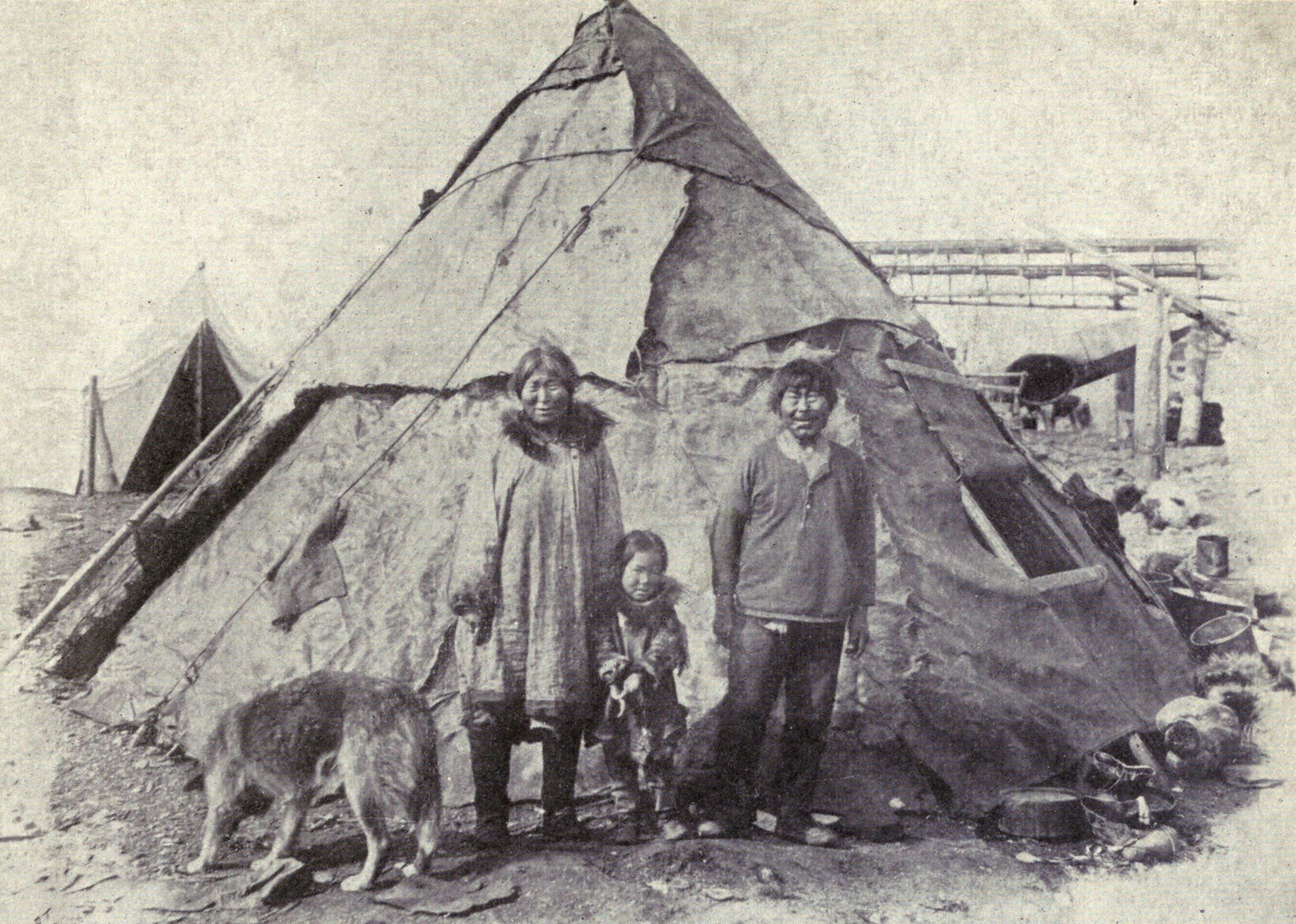
An Inupiat family with an Alaskan Malamute from 1915

Dogs are also occasionally used in illicit activities, most notably dog fighting. All fifty states have criminalized managing, sponsoring, promoting or operating a dogfighting enterprise or inciting dogs to fight, with dogfighting being a felony in 48 states. Several of those laws specifically exempt the employment of dogs for managing livestock and for hunting.

In 1975, no states had recorded a crime conviction for any dogfighting offenses. By 2000 participation in a dogfighting business was illegal in forty-five states, punishable by fines of up to $150,000 and a maximum number of 10 years in jail, depending on the state in which the crime was committed. One notable case occurred in 1998, when, during a police raid, about 55 dogs were found in the California home of Cesar Cerda. It was later determined that Cerda used them for dogfighting. Following a conviction on 63 counts concerning animal cruelty, Cerda was given a jail sentence of 6–7 years.

In 2009, FBI and the Humane Society of Missouri carried out a raid in eight states, in which 407 dogs were collected and an estimated twenty-six individuals were taken into custody. 17 suspects were found guilty. This raid is considered as the "biggest dogfighting raid" in the US.

== Regulation ==
Due to the popularity of dog ownership, dog parks are now found in nearly every city of the country. However, this prevalence has led a few towns, agencies, and others to enforce restrictions. Some towns and urban areas don't permit occupants to have certain types of big-sized dogs, while homeowners insurance agencies sometimes have similar regulations. Due to these actions, individuals are recommended to find out about local laws and regulations when considering a large canine. Additionally, numerous states have chain or leash laws that oblige canines to be on leash when they are outside.

After a rash of attacks within the mid-1980s, some leading to the deaths of toddlers, several American cities have severely restricted possession of pit bulls, making them entirely illegal in some cases. These such laws have been termed "breed-specific legislation" and are often successfully challenged within the courts. A minimum of 2 states — Minnesota and Oklahoma — don't enable their municipalities to control possession of dogs in line with breed. Alternatively, the U.S. Supreme Court has refused to review two state supreme court decisions — in Kansas and Ohio — upholding ordinances that ban people from keeping pit bulls. These laws have also faced scrutiny outside of the United States, with the British Veterinary Association, The Kennel Club of London and others have opposed breed specific legislation.

Additional regulations apply to those involved in the breeding or sale of dogs. Much of these regulations come from the Animal Welfare Act (otherwise known as the "AWA"), which has come to be regarded as the acceptable standard for animal treatment. Under the rules set forth by the act, a dog stock breeder should be licensed with the USDA, and is classified a "class A" dealer. This can be outlined partially as someone "whose business involving animals consists solely of animals that are bred and raised on the premises in a closed and stable colony and those animals acquired for the only purpose of maintaining or enhancing the breeding colony .. [, and] any individual who, in commerce for compensation or profit... sells ... any dog... to be used as a pet." In 1971 breeders became subject to standards issued by the USDA for humane handling and care of dogs. Similarly, "class B" dealers should also be licensed and accommodate AWA laws. In 1993, the USDA issued a final rule requiring that all pet dogs and cats be held for at least five days before being offered to an animal dealer, which must hold a license. This was done to prevent the sale of stolen pets and give pet owners a chance to locate lost or stolen animals.

These are primarily animal brokers or distributors who don't breed dogs and usually hold them in facilities and negotiate their sale to pet shops. Retail stores that sell dogs are not explicitly mentioned by any federal law, but several state regulations on such sales exists. The final classification under the act is for individuals or business who are involved with displaying animals. Such entities are classified as C class and they are required to hold a Class C license. According to an estimate provided by Animal and Plant Health Inspection Service (APHIS), in 2009 there were about 9,530 facilities provided or licensed under the AWA:

| Type | Estimate |
|---|---|
| A | 3,898 |
| B | 1,031 |
| C | 2,732 |
| Researchers/Other | 1,257 |

AWA laws for dogs start with general housing standards. According to the act, the facilities at which dogs live are to be frequently maintained, and often cleaned and sanitized. In addition to this, facilities must effectively forestall escape, access by different animals, and injury. Cooling, heating, ventilation, lighting, and running potable water are all compulsory, as well as "disposal facilities and drainage systems that are constructed and operated so that animal waste and water are rapidly eliminated and animals stay dry." Temperatures in indoor housing should not fall below forty five degrees Fahrenheit or rise higher than eighty five degrees for over four consecutive hours, and dogs should be provided with a daily lighting cycle. Furthermore, different kinds of animals should not be housed alongside other animals of which they are not compatible.

Outside of the AWA, there are additional legal issues pertaining to dogs that are handled by both states and municipalities. The practice of pound seizure (permitting felines and canines to be taken from shelters for research or experimentation) was ordered by three states in 2000, this law established in 2004. Alternatively, twelve states now forbid this practice.

Other practices considered commonplace in the United States are criticized or forbidden abroad. One such instance is the intentional ear cropping and tail docking of specific dogs routinely carried out in the United States for cosmetic purposes. These acts are prohibited in England and few other nations. While not illegal in the United States, both the American Animal Hospital Association and the American Veterinary Medical Association are formally opposed to the ear cropping and tail docking of dogs.

== Vaccinations ==
Notably, many dogs in the country safely receive vaccinations on an annual basis. Since the 1950s, preventative measures have been taken against rabies for both domesticated and wild dogs. Such measures have eliminated canine rabies from the United States.

Complementing internal efforts, dogs entering the country can be subjected to inspection by customs, most significantly dogs being imported from a country where rabies is present. In the event that a dog is brought over from a country determined to be "rabies free" by the World Health Organization, an inspection is not required.

== Statistics ==
The dog population experienced relative stability from 1987 to 1996, before seeing a yearly increase of 3-4% since that time. In 2000, there were 68 million dogs in the country, and by 2017 that estimate had grown to 90 million registered as pets, with about 40% of American households owning a dog.

In 2012, there were 83.3 million dogs and about 47% of households had a dog. 70% of the owners had only one dog, 20% of the owners had two dogs, and 10% of the owners had three or more dogs. In 2017 there was an average of 1.5 pet dogs per household.

In comparison, in 2017 there were 94.2 million pet cats in the USA, yet with fewer households having at least one.

== Fatal dog attacks ==
At least 4.5 – 4.7 million Americans are bitten by dogs every year. About 20 to 30 of these bites result in death, according to the Centers for Disease Control and Prevention (CDC).

=== Delivery workers being attacked by dogs ===
With the rise of e-commerce and more mail, parcel, food, and grocery delivery, dog attacks on delivery workers (such as mail carriers) have been increasing. The owner is liable for any damage, injury, or emotional harm caused by the dog and the company is responsible for workers' compensation if the worker decides to press charges. There were 5,400 reported dog attacks in 2021 on USPS workers. In 2006 there were over 72 million dogs in the United States with over 44.8 million households or 39% owning at least one dog and that was an increase from 34.1 million or 37% of households owning a dog in 1988.

== Dog breeds ==
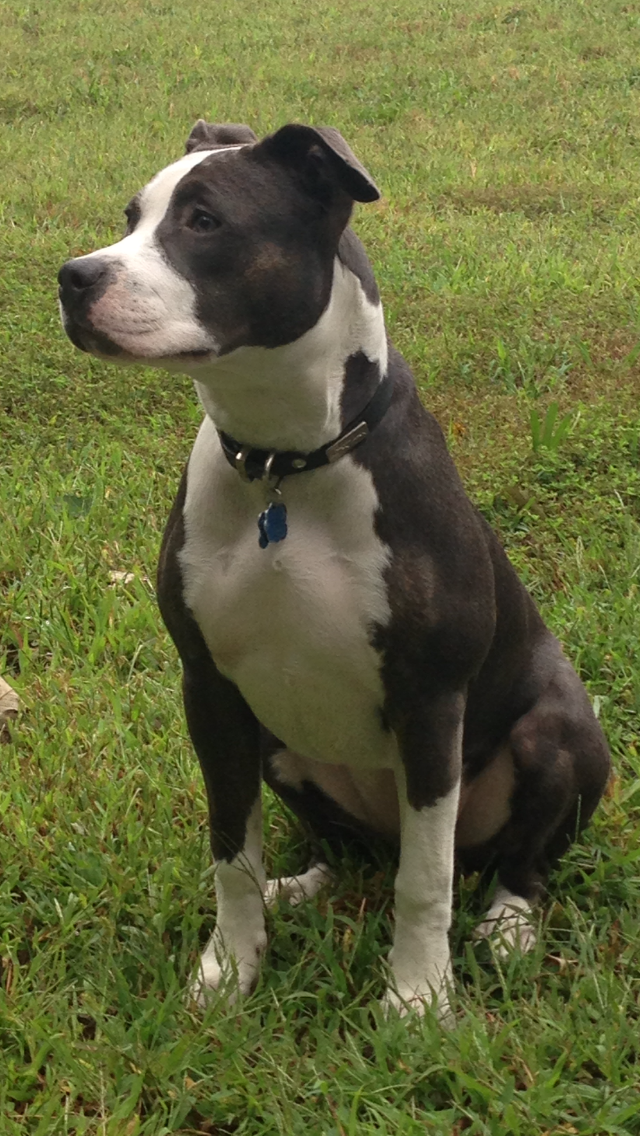
American Pit Bull Terrier

There are a number of dog breeds that originated in the United States:

1. Alaskan Husky
2. Alaskan Klee Kai
3. Alaskan Malamute
4. American Bulldog
5. American Cocker Spaniel
6. American English Coonhound
7. American Eskimo Dog
8. American Foxhound
9. American Hairless Terrier
10. American Leopard Hound
11. American Pit Bull Terrier
12. American Staffordshire Terrier
13. American Water Spaniel
14. Australian Shepherd
15. Black and Tan Coonhound
16. Black and Tan Virginia Foxhound
17. Black Mouth Cur
18. Blue Lacy
19. Bluetick coonhound
20. Boston Terrier
21. Boykin Spaniel
22. Carolina Dog
23. Catahoula Bulldog
24. Catahoula Leopard Dog
25. Chesapeake Bay Retriever
26. Chinook (dog)
27. Cur
28. English Shepherd
29. Feist (dog)
30. Hare Indian Dog
31. Hawaiian Poi Dog
32. King Shepherd
33. Kyi-Leo
34. Longhaired Whippet
35. Majestic Tree Hound
36. McNab dog
37. Miniature American Shepherd
38. Miniature Australian Shepherd
39. Mountain Cur
40. Old Time Farm Shepherd
41. Olde English Bulldogge
42. Pit bull
43. Plott Hound
44. Rat Terrier
45. Redbone Coonhound
46. Salish Wool Dog
47. Shiloh Shepherd Dog
48. Silken Windhound
49. Stephens Cur
50. Teddy Roosevelt Terrier
51. Toy Fox Terrier
52. Toy Manchester Terrier
53. Treeing Cur
54. Treeing Tennessee Brindle
55. Treeing Walker Coonhound
56. Trigg Hound
57. White Shepherd

== See also ==
- List of U.S. state dogs
- Dog fashion
- Fauna of the United States
