= Fatal dog attacks in the United States =

Fatal dog attacks in the United States cause the deaths of thirty to fifty people each year. According to the National Center for Health Statistics, there were 468 deaths in the United States from being bitten or struck by a dog between 2011 and 2021 inclusive. This is an average of 43 deaths annually, ranging from a low of 31 deaths in 2016 to a high of 81 deaths in 2021.

Dogs killed more males than females during the tracked period. Children between the ages of one and four are the most frequent victims, accounting for 29.4% of the fatalities from dog attacks in 2022; those under the age of seventeen accounted for 56.7% of all fatalities that year.

Around 4.5 million Americans are bitten by dogs every year, resulting in some 800,000 seeking medical treatment. Dogs not only cause both injury and death as a result of their bites, but may also transmit zoonotic infections such as rabies, which can also result in illness or death. It is estimated that 15% to 20% of dog bite wounds become infected, with occasional cases of meningitis and endocarditis leading to death.

== Breeds ==
A 2018 Ohio State University Wexner Medical Center literature review covering fifteen years of dog bites treated at the Nationwide Children's Hospital in Columbus, Ohio, and the University of Virginia Health System, with meta-analysis by breed, found that dog bites were most likely to come from the following breeds (in order of highest incidents): pit bull, mixed breed, German Shepherd, terrier, and Rottweiler. Tracking by the American Veterinary Medical Association (AVMA) determined that pit bull type dogs were most likely to be involved in fatal attacks, accounting for 28% of fatalities from 1979 to 1998. The AVMA documented 66 human fatalities caused by pit bull type dogs, 39 by Rottweilers, 17 by German shepherds, 15 by husky type dogs, 12 by Malamutes, 9 by Dobermann Pinschers, 8 by Chow Chows, 7 by Great Danes, and 7 by St. Bernard dogs.

All dog breeds can inflict a bite; breed is not an accurate predictor of whether or not a dog will bite. In the US pit bull-type and Rottweilers most frequently are identified breeds in cases of severe bites. According to the American Veterinary Medical Association, statistics should not be used to infer any breed-specific risk for dog bite fatalities without also noting the numbers of each breed residing in the US.

Attack training is condemned by some as promoting ferocity in dogs; a 1975 American study showed that 10% of dogs that have bitten a person received attack dog training at some point.

== By state ==
Between 1979 and 2005, the states with the most dog bite fatalities per capita were Alaska, South Dakota, Idaho, New Mexico, Arkansas, and South Carolina (from highest to lowest).

States that have enacted legislation that assigns owner liability for dog bites include Michigan, Rhode Island, Florida, California, Texas, and Connecticut.

== List of fatalities from dog attacks ==
Below are lists of notable fatal dog attacks in the United States reported by the news media, published in scholarly papers, or mentioned through other sources. In the lists below, the dog type or breed is assigned by the sources.

=== 19th century fatalities ===
Attack date	Victim	Age	Gender	Dog type (number)	City or county	State	Details
October 29, 1864	Henry Carey	10	Male	Bloodhound (1)	Gloucester	New Jersey	Carey was attacked by the dog and died soon afterward. Witnesses watched the attack before intervening, mistaking him for a dead animal. His smaller dog tried to defend him.
November 5, 1865	Herman Miller	7	Male	Newfoundland (1)	New York City	New York	Miller was bitten on the face by his neighbor's dog. The wound was sewn up but the child died from hydrophobia (rabies) two weeks later. The dog was shot.
January 30, 1874	Ada Clare	39	Female	Poodle (1)	New York City	New York	Clare, an actress, was nursing a pet dog and was bitten in the nose. The dog died soon after. Clare died of rabies (hydrophobia) on March 4, 1874.
March 19, 1877	Miss Boote	Child	Female	English Bulldog (1)	Cincinnati	Ohio	A little girl was feeding the dog when it attacked and started eating her. Neighbors tried to rescue the girl. Police shot the dog which then attacked them. Her mother was also injured in the attack.
September 5, 1882	George R. Reeves	56	Male	Unknown (1)	Reeves County	Texas	Reeves was bitten by a dog and died of hydrophobia (rabies).
November 8, 1890	August Cartwright	Infant	Male	Newfoundland (1)	Lead City (near Rochford)	South Dakota	A new family pet attacked and began eating the baby Cartwright who was briefly left alone with the dog by his mother. Cartwright's father killed the dog with his ax.
September 30, 1896	Laura Barmann	7	Female	St. Bernard (1)	Maryville	Missouri	A group of children were attacked by a dog. One girl and a baby died. The dog was killed.
September 30, 1896		Infant	Female	St. Bernard (1)	Maryville	Missouri	A group of children were attacked by a dog. One girl and a baby died. The dog was killed.

=== 20th century fatalities ===
Attack date	Victim	Age	Gender	Dog type (number)	City or county	State	Details
November 13, 1909	John Eldice	1	Male	Bull terrier (1)	New York City	New York	An eight-year-old girl and eighteen-month-old Eldice were left alone with the dog that attacked the boy. The two were supposed to be watched by their older siblings while their mother worked. Neighbors heard the girl's screams and the dog's barking. The police shot the dog several times before it died. Eldice died in the hospital.
November 13, 1912	Florence Dietz		Female	Unknown (1)	Cleveland	Ohio	A bride was bitten by a puppy given to her as a wedding gift by her husband. She died of hydrophobia (rabies), along with the puppy and another dog that it bit.
February 17, 1913	Minot A. Steel	46	Male	Unknown (1)	Portsmouth	Rhode Island	Steel was attacked and killed by a dog which was still at large.
August 18, 1917	Ralph Protta	9	Male	Mongrel (2)	New York City	New York	Protta climbed a fence and was dragged into a yard by two dogs. Police shot one dog, ending the attack. The boy died before arriving at the hospital.
July 28, 1923	Joseph Gennatt Jr.	9	Male	Great Dane (2)	Florham Park	New Jersey	Two guard dogs attacked a boy who entered a picnic park, severing his jugular vein. Six men attempted to stop the attack with sticks and stones, but the boy bled to death. The police arrested the dog's owner who leased the park.
February 22, 1926	Harry Griffin	40 to 50	Male	Unknown (2)	Yonkers	New York	Griffin, a one-arm mechanic, was found dead after a dog attack. Police found and killed the dogs, following tracks and blood in the snow.
July 31, 1944	Carol Pardo	6	Female	German Shepherd (1)	Ephrata	Pennsylvania	Pardo was attacked by a working dog on a farm where her family was vacationing. She died in the hospital.
February 7, 1947	Walter Momer Jr.	4	Male	German Shepherd (1)	Philadelphia	Pennsylvania	Momer was attacked and killed by a stray dog while sledding near his home. A neighbor shot the dog, which had attacked four children the prior day.
July 1, 1947	Stanley Balaben	11	Male	Bull Terrier (pack)	The Bronx, New York City	New York	Balaben was near a public bathing pool when he was attacked and killed by a dog pack that had escaped its enclosure. The dogs' owner was convicted of second-degree manslaughter.
June 1, 1955	Winifred W. L. Bacon	64	Female	Doberman pinscher (2)	Toms River	New Jersey	A woman was found dead on the beach near her house, the victim of a dog attack. Her two pet dogs were near her body and one had her blood on its mouth.
May 23, 1959	Mark D. Draper	2	Male	Stray mixed breed dogs (6 to 8)	Hazelwood	Missouri	Draper was playing near his home when he was attacked and killed by a pack of dogs. A neighbor found the boy's body, still being guarded by the dogs and was able to identify 5 of the 17 dogs rounded up by the police.
June 30, 1959	Gary Harvey	2	Male	Bird dog (1)	Elizabethtown	Indiana	Harvey was playing with his grandparents' dog when it bit him in the throat, severing his jugular vein. A neighbor shot and killed the dog.
June 18, 1962	Brett Alan Whitney	2	Male	Siberian Husky (1)	Boulder	Colorado	Whitney was killed in the backyard of his duplex by his neighbor's dog that was chained.
November 8, 1965	Mrs. Ross Rasmussen	60	Female	German Shepherd (1)	Baraboo	Wisconsin	Rasmussen was killed by her pet dog in her home. The prior month, she spent three weeks in the hospital recovering from an attack by the same dog. Her husband shot the dog.
December 17, 1967	Eugene H. Goodman Jr.	4	Male	German Shepherd (4)	Madison Heights	Virginia	A neighbor's dogs attacked and killed the Goodman brothers in their yard. Their father was injured in the attack. Police shot two dogs and impounded two others.
December 17, 1967	Kenneth Goodman	3	Male	German Shepherd (4)	Madison Heights	Virginia	A neighbor's dogs attacked and killed the Goodman brothers in their yard. Their father was injured in the attack. Police shot two dogs and impounded two others.
December 23, 1967	Darla Anne Harper	4	Female	Great Dane (1)	Fairyland	Georgia	Harper was playing outside when the family pet attacked her. She died on the way to the hospital.
March 2, 1969	Susan Babiarz	<1	Female	German Shepherd (1)	Cheektowaga	New York	The one-month-old Babiarz was bitten by the family dog while in her crib. She later died from shock.
April 11, 1969	Margaret Marie Sanford	<1	Female	Siberian Husky (1)	St. Johns	Michigan	Seven-week-old Sanford was dragged from her crib and killed by the family pet. The dog was killed.
February 9, 1970	Anthony Cliff	1	Male	German Shepherd (1)	Brentwood	Missouri	Eighteen-month-old Cliff was bitten while in his crib by the family pet. He later died in the hospital.
February 3, 1972	Wilson Brite	50	Male	German Shepherd (2 or 3)	Charlottesville	Virginia	Brite was attacked and killed by dogs when getting out of his car.
April 25, 1974	Lawrence Calemno	6	Male	St. Bernard (1)	Islip	New York	Calemno was bitten to death by the 106 lb (48 kg) St. Bernard while playing in the owner's home. The dog was shot and killed by its owner.
August 1, 1975	Michael Yount	5	Male	Labrador x German Shepherd mix (7)	Reno	Nevada	Yount went to play with a friend, who was not at home and was attacked by the friend's family dogs when he entered their yard. He later died at the hospital.
December 6, 1975		78	Female	Unknown (20 to 40)	Fayette	Mississippi	A woman was getting ready to cook rabbits in her house when she was attacked and killed by her pet dogs.
April 15, 1977	Matthew Weck	5	Male	St. Bernard (1)	Lemont	Illinois	Weck tried to pet a neighbor's dog and was attacked. He was dead when he arrived at the hospital.
December 28, 1980	Kevin Zook	14	Male	Great Dane (3)	Akin	Illinois	Zook's motorcycle ran out of gas. When he stopped at a neighbor's farmhouse for help, he was chased and killed by four dogs. The dogs' owner had them euthanized.
December 28, 1980	Kevin Zook	14	Male	Great Dane x St. Bernard mix (1)	Akin	Illinois	Zook's motorcycle ran out of gas. When he stopped at a neighbor's farmhouse for help, he was chased and killed by four dogs. The dogs' owner had them euthanized.
November 20, 1979	Hubert Russell	6	Male	German Shepherd (2)	Jersey City	New Jersey	Two guard dogs were usually kept in an enclosed yard but escaped that day. Russell was bitten multiple times; the autopsy revealed that he had a severed jugular vein. Police shot the dogs.
January 23, 1981	Mary Logan	81	Female	Mixed breed (7)	Philadelphia	Pennsylvania	Logan was attacked by her son's dogs that lived in the household for about 18 months.
March 3, 1984	Rachel Hernandez	4	Female	Siberian Husky (1)	Sioux Falls	South Dakota	Hernandez was playing in her yard when she was attacked by her neighbor's dog that broke free from its rope. She was declared dead at the hospital. The dog was taken into custody.
June 13, 1987	James Soto	2	Male	Pit bull (1)	Santa Clara County, Morgan Hill	California	The chained dog named Willy attacked Soto who wandered into its yard. His owner, Michael Barry, was the first dog owner to be charged with second-degree murder. In 1989, Barry was found guilty of involuntary manslaughter in Berry v. Superior Court and sentenced to prison for 3 years and 8 months. Soto's family was also awarded $3.5 million in a civil suit.
September 27, 1987	Shannon Tucker	2	Female	German cattle dog or Rottweiler (1)	Columbus	Ohio	Tucker was playing outside her apartment when she was attacked by her neighbor's dogs. She died at the hospital. The dogs were seized by animal control, and their owner was arrested under the Ohio vicious dog ordinance.
September 27, 1987	Shannon Tucker	2	Female	Pit bull (1)	Columbus	Ohio	Tucker was playing outside her apartment when she was attacked by her neighbor's dogs. She died at the hospital. The dogs were seized by animal control, and their owner was arrested under the Ohio vicious dog ordinance.
April 24, 1997	Christopher Wilson	11	Male	Rottweiler (3)	Milford	Kansas	Wilson and his brother were waiting for the school bus when they were attacked by three dogs. His brother survived the attack by climbing a tree but Wilson was killed. The dogs were shot by law officers. The dogs' owner was arrested.
April 24, 1997	Derrick Brandell	4	Male	Pit bull (2 ?)	Lamar	Missouri	As Brandell's parents cut the grass for a client, he was killed by the homeowner's dogs in their backyard. The sheriff destroyed the dogs.
December 4, 1999	John Mickle	45	Male	Pit bull (2)	Fairfield County	South Carolina	While taking a walk, Mickle was dragged and bitten over 1,000 times by two loose dogs. The dogs' owner was charged with involuntary manslaughter.

=== 21st century fatalities ===
==== 2000s ====
Attack date	Victim	Age	Gender	Dog type (number)	City or county	State	Details
April 29, 2000	Cash Carson	10	Male	Pit bull mix (2)	San Bernardino County	California	Carson and a friend were walking on a neighbor's dirt road when he was attacked by two dogs whose gate had been left open. He was pronounced dead at the hospital.
January 26, 2001	Diane Whipple	33	Female	Presa Canario (2)	San Francisco	California	Whipple was attacked in the hallway by two dogs under care and control of her neighbors while entering her apartment. Her neighbor was walking the dogs. She died at the hospital. The neighbor was convicted of second-degree murder.
March 5, 2001	Rodney McAllister	10	Male	Pack of dogs	St-Louis	Missouri	McAllister went to a nearby neighborhood park to play basketball and was attacked by a pack of dogs. Several of the dogs were claimed by owners after they were seized. Multiple residents had complained about the pack of dogs prior to the attack.
February 14, 2002	Alicia Clark	10	Female	Rottweilers (6)	Elroy	Wisconsin	Clark was visiting a schoolmate's home when she was attacked by dogs owned by a 24-year-old man living in the home. The dogs had no history of violence, but a charge of homicide for negligent control of vicious animals was still expected to be filed.
September 7, 2003	Valerie DeSwart	67	Female	Doberman pinscher (1)	Medford	New Jersey	DeSwart was found dead in her home by her boyfriend ten days after adopting a dog. The dog was nearby, spattered in blood. The dog bit its previous owner, who had paid for it to be euthanized by the shelter. Law enforcement investigated the nonprofit shelter.
March 8, 2005	Dorothy Sullivan	82	Female	Pit bull (3)	Partlow	Virginia	Sullivan was walking her Shih Tzu dog when she was attacked and killed by her neighbor's dogs which were running free. There were several prior complaints about the dogs. Their owner was convicted of involuntary manslaughter in the first case of its kind in Virginia.
April 11, 2005	Robert Schafer	4	Male	Rottweiler x German Shepherd mix (1)	Orange County	Virginia	The boy opened the gate to the pen when the family dog was chained. The dog broke the boy's neck. Animal control euthanized the dog.
May 5, 2005	Julia Beck	87	Female	Unknown (2)	Marion	Indiana	Beck, who used a wheelchair, was attacked by her daughter's pets. She died in the hospital two weeks later. Her daughter claimed strays had attacked her mother, which was later disproven. Her daughter and son-in-law pled guilty to criminal recklessness in association with Beck's death.
May 5, 2005	Lorinze Reddings	42	Male	Pit bull (2)	St. Louis	Missouri	Reddings was found dead in his home, having been attacked by his two pet dogs.
June 3, 2005	Nicholas Faibish	12	Male	Pit bull (1 or 2)	San Francisco	California	Faibish was home alone when a family pet killed him. His mother had separated the dogs from the boy before leaving the house. Neighbors called the police after hearing Faibish calls for help. One dog was shot by police and the other was taken into custody.
May 10, 2006	Raymond Tomco	78	Male	Pit bull (3)	Lusby	Maryland	Tomco was found dead in his home with bite wounds from dogs belonging to his daughter. In the past year, she was cited multiple times for unlicensed and unrestrained dogs. Animal control shot one dog and took the others into custody to be euthanized.
October 7, 2006	Jeannine Fusco	44	Female	Pit bull (1)	Norwood	New Jersey	Fusco was dogsitting when she was attacked and killed by the dog. Her sister was also injured in the attack. The police shot the dog.
January 3, 2008	Andrew Stein	<1	Male	Doberman Pinscher (1)	Brooklyn	New York	The 8-month-old infant was attacked and killed by the family's dog at home while being cared for by his grandmother. Andrew was rushed to the hospital where he was pronounced dead. Several neighbors claimed that the dog was friendly.
January 11, 2009	Alex Angulo	4	Male	Rottweiler (1)	Chicago	Illinois	Alex was fatally attacked by at least one of the family's two Rottweiler dogs in his backyard while his father was shoveling snow. The child was later pronounced dead at the hospital. Some neighbors claimed that the dogs sometimes acted aggressively. The dogs were euthanized.
January 20, 2009	Olivia Rozek	<1	Female	Siberian Husky (1)	Bourbonnais	Illinois	Olivia was fatally attacked by the family's dog. The mother had laid Olivia in her bed next to her twin sister and then went into the kitchen. While the mother was in the kitchen, the dog attacked Olivia and dragged her by her head from the bedroom to the hallway. Olivia was airlifted to the hospital where she died due to the injuries. Olivia's twin sister was not harmed.
December 12, 2009	Dallas Lee Walters	1	Male	Rottweiler (1)	New Port Richey	Florida	The dog attacked the toddler when he reached to pick up a cookie he had dropped. The attack happened during a party at the toddler's aunt's home. Family members took Dallas to the hospital where he later died due to his injuries.

==== 2010s ====
Attack date	Victim	Age	Gender	Dog type (number)	City or county	State	Details
February 28, 2010	Ashlynn Anderson	4	Female	Rottweiler (1)	Astoria	Oregon	Anderson was attacked by one of her family's dogs. She was flown to the hospital but died due to blood loss while in transport. A few months before the fatal incident, a deputy had responded to a call and removed another aggressive dog that had bitten a family member. The dog was euthanized.
April 25, 2011	Margaret Salcedo	48	Female	Pit bull (1), Pit bull mix (3)	Sierra County, Truth or Consequences	New Mexico	Salcedo was attacked while taking a walk and died a few hours later.
November 12, 2012	Dawn Brown	44	Female	Mastiff or Bullmastiff (1)	Big Rock	Illinois	A recently adopted dog attacked Brown in her home. Her husband found her dead. They got the dog from a relative who did not want the dog around a newborn baby. The dog was brought to animal control and was euthanized.
April 2, 2013	Tyler Jett	7	Male	Alapaha Blue Blood Bulldog (1)	Panama City	Florida	Jett was riding his bicycle when attacked by the dogs. He died a week later in the hospital. The dog owner was found guilty of manslaughter and was sentenced to ten years in prison.
April 2, 2013	Tyler Jett	7	Male	Bulldog (1)	Panama City	Florida	Jett was riding his bicycle when attacked by the dogs. He died a week later in the hospital. The dog owner was found guilty of manslaughter and was sentenced to ten years in prison.
May 8, 2013	Carlton Freeman	80	Male	Unknown (4)	Harleyville	South Carolina	Freeman was attacked by several dogs that pulled him out of his motorized wheelchair.
May 9, 2013	Pamela Maria Devitt	63	Female	Pit bull (4)	Littlerock	California	Devitt was out for a morning walk when she was attacked by dogs. Her DNA was found on four dogs, that had previously attacked others. The dogs' owner was convicted of second-degree murder.
December 7, 2013	Jah'niyah White	2	Female	Pit bull (2)	Chicago	Illinois	White died after being attacked by two dogs. She was with her grandfather when the incident occurred.
July 20, 2014	Johnathan Quarles	<1	Male	American Staffordshire Terrier (1)	Dayton	Ohio	Quarles was visiting his step-grandmother when he was attacked. The dog attacked and injured another dog a month before. Animal control removed the dog.
June 28, 2015	Jordan Collins-Tyson	3	Male	Pit bull (1)	Lawton	Oklahoma	The babysitter found the injured boy and called for help. The arriving police officers shot the dog. The dog bit the boy in the neck
December 15, 2015	Carter Evan Hartle	<1	Male	Pit bull x Shar Pei	Oneida County	New York	The 11-month-old child was attacked by the 2-year-old family dog while playing in his home with his siblings. The dog was euthanized.
January 3, 2016	Tyler Trammell-Huston	9	Male	Pit bull (3)	Linda	California	Trammell-Huston was alone with his half-sister's dogs when he was attacked and killed.
January 17, 2017	Skylar Dean Julius	<1	Female	German Shepherd (1)	San Marcos	Texas	The family dog killed two-month-old Julius who was in her infant bouncer while her father was sleeping. Julius was taken to the hospital where she was declared dead.
January 17, 2017	Logan Braatz	6	Male	Pit bull mix (2)	Atlanta	Georgia	Braatz was attacked while walking to his bus stop. He later died at the hospital. A second child was seriously injured but survived after spending weeks in the hospital. The dogs' owner was charged with involuntary manslaughter.
March 23, 2017		<1	Male	Pit bull type (1)	Lusby	Maryland	The family's pet attacked the eight-month-old boy, while he was being watched by a family friend. Police shot the dog to stop the attack but the boy was already dead.
October 21, 2017	Javien Candelario	7	Male	Pit bull (2)	Lowell	Massachusetts	The 7-year-old child was attacked and killed by 2 dogs.
December 14, 2017	Bethany Stephens	22	Female	Pit bull (2)	Glen Allen	Virginia	Stephens, who had been walking her two dogs, was reported missing. The next day, she was found dead, with the dogs guarding and eating her body. Police said it appeared she had been mauled to death by the dogs. The dogs were euthanized.
December 7, 2017	Emily Mae Colvin	24	Female	Pit bull (4–5)	Jackson County	Alabama	Colvin was attacked and killed in front of her home. Her death led to the creation of "Emily's Law".
January 9, 2018	Laura Williams Ray	53	Female	Pit bull (1)	West Monroe	Louisiana	Ray was killed by a pit bull owned by her kennel client. Animal control euthanized the dog.
March 7, 2018		<1	Female	Wolfdog hybrid (1)	Lee County	Virginia	The family pet attacked an eight-day-old who was in a bassinet. She died at the hospital. The dog was euthanized.
March 25, 2018	Hong Saengsamly	49	Female	Pit bull (1–2)	Milwaukee	Wisconsin	Saengsamly was attacked in her house by her pet dog. Her son found her dead, with the dog guarding her body. He shot the dog.
May 10, 2018	Tracy Garcia	52	Female	Mix breed (7)	Ardmore	Oklahoma	Garcia was attacked by her neighbor's dogs while walking near her home. She later died in the hospital. Police shot one dog and the rest were euthanized.
May 30, 2018		<1	Female	Pit bull (1)	Miramar	Florida	An eight-month-old girl in a bouncy chair was attacked by the family pet while in the care of her grandmother. Fire and rescue declared her dead at the scene.
July 8, 2018	Joseph Pettaway	51	Male	Unknown (1)	Montgomery	Alabama	Pettaway was attacked by a police dog, Niko, whose handler was responding to a burglary call. Pettaway had permission to stay at the house he was renovating. He died at the hospital.
December 15, 2018	Angela Johnson	54	Female	Pit bull (3)	Anza	California	Johnson was attacked in her yard by loose dogs. She was taken to hospital and died on February 9, 2019. All three dogs were euthanized.
February 26, 2019	Bessie Jill Peterson	88	Female	German Shepherd (6)	Pall Mall	Tennessee	Peterson was mauled after going to the back of her yard to clean a drainage ditch. She died at the hospital.
August 2019 (ca. August 20)	Emma Hernandez	9	Female	Pit bull (3)	Detroit	Michigan	The 9-year-old was riding her bike near her home and was attacked by 3 dogs. The dogs' owner was charged with second-degree murder. There had been repeated complaints about these dogs, but officials never took action. Detroit City Council later amended their dangerous animal ordinance by adding "Emma's Clause", requiring animal control to investigate all complaints about dangerous animals including visiting the location and taking photographs.

==== 2020s ====
Attack date	Victim	Age	Gender	Dog type (number)	City or county	State	Details
January 8, 2020	Kay Torres	52	Female	Unknown (pack)	Taos County, Taos Pueblo	New Mexico	Torres was found surrounded by several dogs with bite marks to her arms and legs. The autopsy ruled out homicide.
January 10, 2020	Donald W. Abner	55	Male	Pit bull (1)	Rockcastle County	Kentucky	The dog's owner set the former fighting dog named Denali on the man. The police officers had to shoot the dog to help the man. The dog owner was charged with murder. She pleaded guilty and was sentenced to 20 years in prison.
May 9, 2020	Lisa Urso	52	Female	French Bulldog mix (1)	Fox Lake	Illinois	Urso was found unresponsive on her patio after being attacked by the family dog. The dog had been involved in two previous bite incidents.
June 11, 2020		<1	Male	Belgian Malinois (1)	Hartford	South Dakota	The family dog bit an infant multiple times. The baby died at the hospital the same day. The dog was taken by the local humane society.
October 19, 2020	Ruthie Mae Brown	36	Female	Pit bull (7 to 8)	Nauvoo	Alabama	Brown was killed by a dog pack while walking. A witness said Brown was attacked by seven or eight dogs. Two of the animals were turned in by their owner; three others were captured.
October 26, 2020		<1		German Shepherd mix (1)	Hampton	Virginia	A dog killed an infant as it slept next to the parent's bed. The baby's father awoke during the attack, saw the injuries to the child, and immediately killed the dog.
December 17, 2020	Erick J. Quinn	46	Male	Pit bull (1)	Joliet	Illinois	Quinn was killed when he tried to calm a dog, which had become agitated when two women in the home Quinn was visiting began arguing.
January 20, 2021	Cameron Hatfield	6	Male	Pit bull (1)	Brunson	South Carolina	Hatfield was killed at home by the dog, which was later euthanized by animal control authorities.
March 16, 2021	Aziz Ahmed	3	Male	Pit bull (2)	Carteret	New Jersey	Ahmed and his mother were in their fenced-in backyard when the two dogs dug under. He was taken to the hospital by helicopter and died. His mother was hospitalized with injuries. The dogs were shot by police who responded to the incident.
April 30, 2021	Elayah Brown	4	Female	Mixed breed (1)	Fort Worth	Texas	Brown was attacked by the family pet and later died at the hospital. Animal control euthanized the dog.
April 27, 2021	Jayden Henderson	7	Female	Pit bull (2)	Garner	North Carolina	Henderson and her mother, were pet sitting a neighbor's dogs when they were attacked. Henderson later died in the hospital. The owners fought to keep the dogs, which were euthanized under a judge's order. A local ordinance was passed requiring the euthanization of dogs that kill a person.
June 10, 2021	Unknown	3	Male	Pit bull (2)	Union County, Elizabeth	New Jersey	The child fell out of a window and was attacked and killed by the family's dogs.
June 13, 2021	Shamar Sherif Jackson	7	Male	Unknown (2 to 5)	Marion	South Carolina	Jackson and his brother were looking for their chihuahua when they were attacked by a dog pack. His brother escaped but Jackson was killed. Five dogs were taken into custody and their owner was charged with involuntary manslaughter.
October 20, 2021	James McNeelis	7	Male	Sheltland Sheepdog x Corgie mix (1)	Kiefer	Oklahoma	McNeelis was reported missing but was later found dead on his family's property. The police investigation revealed that he was killed by the family dog. The dog was adopted from the shelter three weeks earlier.
December 12, 2021	Duke Little Whirlwind	58	Male	Unknown (pack)	Northern Cheyenne Reservation	Montana	Whirlwind was found dead on a road near his home, the victim of a dog attack.
December 30, 2021		34	Male	American Bully (1)	Chicago	Illinois	The victim was found by police in the living room of his home with visible bite marks. An autopsy determined the man died of multiple injuries from a dog mauling.
January 27, 2022	Saad Al-Anazi	59	Male	German Shepherd (2)	Las Cruces	New Mexico	Al-Anazi was attacked outside his house by his neighbor's dogs. He died the next day in the hospital. Animal control took two of the dogs into custody.
January 29, 2022	Olivia Grace Floyd	7	Female	Rottweiler (1)	Waynesboro	Virginia	Floyd was attacked by her grandparents' dog and died at the hospital. An adult woman was also injured. The grandparents were charged with involuntary manslaughter and her parents were charged with child neglect but the charges were dropped.
February 17, 2022	Pam Robb	71	Female	Bully mix (1)	Fort Lauderdale	Florida	Robb was volunteering at an animal shelter and was working with a dog when it attacked, pulling her to the ground. Another woman attempted to intervene and suffered minor injuries. Robb was taken to a hospital and later died. The dog was euthanized.
March 22, 2022	Serenity Garnett	<1	Female	American Bulldog x Great Pyrenees mix (1)	Martinez	Georgia	The seven-month-old Garnett was attacked by the dog while being watched by her great-grandmother, who was renting a room from the dog's owners. The girl died at the hospital, where the great-grandmother was treated for injuries she received while trying to rescue the girl. The great-grandmother, who was watching the dog for its owners, was charged with second-degree murder.
May 14, 2022	Scottie Brigman	36	Male	Pit bull (4)	Chesterfield County	South Carolina	Police found Brigman dead in the road, surrounded by four dogs. His body was covered in dog bites.
May 22, 2022	Ronda Persall	57	Female	Labrador Retriever mix (2)	Cullman County	Alabama	Persall was attacked and killed by two dogs that had escaped from the neighbor's fenced backyard. The neighbor went outside when he heard commotion and found Persall who was still alive and lying next to a car. The neighbor took Persall to the hospital where she died.
May 31, 2022	Richard Barry	59	Male	English Bulldog (5)	Selma	California	Barry was out for a walk when he was attacked and killed by five dogs that had escaped from a nearby house. Two family members witnessed the attack but were not able to save Barry. Animal Control captured the dogs.
June 3, 2022	Debbie Boyd	70	Female	Rottweiler (1)	Sevier County	Tennessee	Boyd was attacked and killed by at least one of her two dogs. She was found dead in her home. A small child who was also in the home was not injured.
June 9, 2022	Nicolas Vasquez	51	Male	Pit bull terrier mix (3)	Harris County	Texas	Vasquez was walking when he was attacked and partially eaten by a neighbor's dogs. His legs were amputated at the hospital where he died ten days later. The dogs, who had attacked Vasquez previously, were taken into custody by animal control.
July 7, 2022	Trena Peed	46	Female	Pit bull (2)	Greensboro	North Carolina	Peed was dog sitting two dogs at her home. She was attacked while letting them into the yard. The attack was heard and witnessed by neighbors. Police shot one of the dogs and took possession of both dogs.
July 9, 2022	Lea Freeman	4	Female	Pit bull (3)	Dallas	Texas	She was killed while her mother left the residence to buy drinks. A woman was supposed to watch her. The grandmother told authorities that the girl was afraid of the dogs and that she was afraid for the girl's safety. Dallas Animal Services seized and euthanized 3 dogs.
July 11, 2022	Apollo Duplantis	1	Male	Unknown (1)	New Orleans	Louisiana	The thirteen-month-old boy of Gentilly was attacked by the family dog and died at the hospital. The dog also attacked an officer and was shot at the scene.
July 28, 2022	Marina Gabunia Verriest	70	Female	Pit bull (1)	Long Island, Nassau County, Albertson	New York	The 70-year-old was attacked and killed in her yard by a 7-year-old dog that had lived with the family all its life. She was found dead by her husband. A responding police officer was subsequently taken to the hospital due to the traumatic scene he was confronted with. The dog was shot dead by police.
August 15, 2022	Mindy Kiepe	43	Female	Great Dane (5)	Rossie	Iowa	Kiepe was attacked and killed by her dogs. Her body was discovered in a ditch a short distance from her farm. All five dogs were euthanized.
August 21, 2022	Pamela Jane Rock	61	Female	Pit bull (5)	Putnam County	Florida	Five dogs escaped from their yard and attacked Rock, a postal worker whose vehicle had broken down. She died the next day at a trauma center. One of her arms was amputated before she died. The dogs had a history of aggressive behavior and breaking free. The dogs were euthanized.
August 26, 2022			Male	Unknown	Channelview	Texas	A man who had been riding a bicycle was found dead on the road with multiple dog bites. Authorities said the area had many stray dogs.
October 5, 2022	Hollace Dean Bennard	<1	Male	Pit bull (2)	Shelby County	Tennessee	Two family pets attacked and killed the Bennard siblings. Their mother attempted to shield the children and suffered extensive injuries over her entire body and face but survived. Both dogs were euthanized.
October 5, 2022	Lilly Jane Bennard	2	Female	Pit bull (2)	Shelby County	Tennessee	Two family pets attacked and killed the Bennard siblings. Their mother attempted to shield the children and suffered extensive injuries over her entire body and face but survived. Both dogs were euthanized.
October 7, 2022	Soon Han	80	Female	Dogo Argentino (2)	Baldy Mesa	California	Two dogs attacked Soon while she was out for a walk. The dogs were held by animal control, pending further investigation.
October 24, 2022		Adult	Male	English Mastiff (1)	Excelsior Springs	Missouri	A delivery driver was found dead in a yard after an Amazon van that had been parked for several hours was reported to authorities. The dogs were aggressive as the deputies approached and were shot and killed.
October 24, 2022		Adult	Male	German Shepherd (1)	Excelsior Springs	Missouri	A delivery driver was found dead in a yard after an Amazon van that had been parked for several hours was reported to authorities. The dogs were aggressive as the deputies approached and were shot and killed.
January 6, 2023	Sadie Davila	7	Female	Pit bull terrier mix (1)	East Baton Rouge Parish	Louisiana	Davila was playing outside of a relative's house when she was attacked by a neighbor's dog. She was taken to the hospital and died. The dog's owner was arrested for negligent homicide. The dog was euthanized.
January 21, 2023		7	Male	Rottweiler (2)	Fort Hall Indian Reservation	Idaho	A boy was attacked on his front porch by his neighbor's dogs. His mother was injured trying to stop the attack. Both were taken to the hospital where the boy was declared dead. Tribal authorities euthanized the dogs.
January 21, 2023		7	Male	Mixed breed (2)	Fort Hall Indian Reservation	Idaho	A boy was attacked on his front porch by his neighbor's dogs. His mother was injured trying to stop the attack. Both were taken to the hospital where the boy was declared dead. Tribal authorities euthanized the dogs.
February 26, 2023	Ramon Najera	81	Male	American Staffordshire Terrier (3)	San Antonio	Texas	Najera was killed and his wife was seriously injured after three dogs escaped from a neighbor's yard through a hole in a fence. Two others were injured in the attack, and two men had required medical treatment after previous attacks. The owner was arrested and charged with criminal negligence.
March 7, 2023	Mateo Salvador	42	Male	Belgian Malinois (3)	Jurupa Valley	California	Salvador was doing construction work at the property when he was attacked by the owner's four dogs. He died at the hospital the same day. The owner, who was not at home when the attack occurred, surrendered the dogs to be euthanized.
March 7, 2023	Mateo Salvador	42	Male	Cane Corso (1)	Jurupa Valley	California	Salvador was doing construction work at the property when he was attacked by the owner's four dogs. He died at the hospital the same day. The owner, who was not at home when the attack occurred, surrendered the dogs to be euthanized.
April 4, 2023		2	Male	Mastiff x pit bull mix (1)	Brunswick	Maryland	The boy was attacked and killed by a pet dog at a family member's house. He was declared dead at the hospital.
April 13, 2023	Dezmond Thomas Trawick	22	Male	American Pit Bull Terrier (4)	Brooklyn Center	Minnesota	Trawick was watching his brother's dogs for the day and was attacked in his backyard. He died at the hospital about an hour after the attack.
May 9, 2023	Tamieka White	46	Female	Pit bull type (1)	Indianapolis	Indiana	White was dog-sitting, White died trying to protect her six-year-old son in an attack in her backyard. She was found in her garage and pronounced dead. Animal services impounded a deceased dog, three dogs, and a cat from the home.
June 23, 2023	Helene Jackson	84	Female	American Staffordshire Terrier	Sierra Vista	Arizona	Jackson and her small dog Lily were attacked by an American Staffordshire Terrier named Thor which jumped over a wall of a nearby home. A man who stayed at the dog owners' residence tried to prevent the other dog named Panda to also jump over the wall. He was severely injured by the dog of the same breed and stayed in critical condition after the attack. He had an arm amputated and needed over 100 stitches and a skin graft. Jackson was also severely injured and was airlifted to a local hospital but died shortly after. Her dog was found dead nearby. The police shot the two dogs. The dog owners were charged with manslaughter, negligent homicide, assault by a vicious animal, and aggressive dog violation. Both received jail sentences. 4 months before the fatal attack the same dogs already escaped and attacked a man and his dog.
June 20, 2023	Lewis Flores	40	Male	Unknown (pack)	Rockport	Texas	Flores was attacked by a dog pack. Police stopped the attack but the pack scattered. The dog pack was later captured and their owner was arrested in connection with Flores' death.
July 29, 2023	Demarcus "Sam" McKenzie	27	Male	Unknown (5 or 6)	Skipperville	Alabama	Surveillance footage showed that dogs attacked McKenzie as he left an acquaintance's home. His injuries were so severe, responding officers initially investigated the death as a homicide, believing McKenzie had suffered a fatal gunshot wound to the head. The autopsy later revealed the official cause of death was sharp force trauma caused by canines. Ten dogs were euthanized in relation to the attack.
August 1, 2023	Robert "Bob" Northrop	71	Male	Unknown (4)	Kau	Hawaii	Northrop was attacked by dogs while walking to a friend's house. He later died in the hospital. The owners surrendered the dogs to animal control.
August 31, 2023	Chanthy Philavong Mateu	93	Female	Cane Corso (2)	Modesto	California	Mateu was attacked by her neighbor's dogs that had escaped from their yard. She later died in the hospital.
September 21, 2023†	Billene "Billi" Cameron	65	Female	Pit bull (2)	Kennewick	Washington	On September 20, 2023, two pit bulls escaped their yard and attacked a neighbor's dog, then attacked Cameron as she tried to save her dog. Cameron was seriously bitten and died a few hours later, on September 21. Both dogs had a history of getting loose and both had been "declared dangerous" by the county for several attacks on humans and other animals. The owner, Sara Amilia Madrigal, 34, had to file for permits to keep the dogs, though after this killing the dogs were seized and euthanized. Madrigal had kept the dogs in her backyard "because she didn't believe it was safe to have them in the house around her children". Madrigal was charged with "dog attack resulting in injury or death", pled guilty, was sentenced to 10 months with work release, will be subject to restitution, and cannot own a dog for the next five years.
October 31, 2023; November 6, 2023†	Sandra Miller	63	Female	Pit bull (2)	Taylorsville	Utah	A woman was attacked by at least 2 of her son's 7 dogs in her yard. A 3-year-old female dog was shot dead by police and an adult male dog and 5 puppies were seized by animal control. She was severely injured and lost one leg. She died a week after the attack. Her son was charged with 7 counts of attack by animal.
October 31, 2023	Lovell Anderson	4	Male	Pit bull mix (1)	Spokane	Washington	Anderson was attacked by a family pet. He later died at the hospital. The dog was injured and euthanized.
December 1, 2023		<1	Male	Wolfdog hybrid (1)	Chelsea	Alabama	A family pet attacked a three-month-old. He was pronounced dead upon arrival at the hospital. The dog was euthanized.
December 5, 2023	Loyalty Scott	6	Male	Great Dane x Mastiff mix (2)	Portland	Oregon	Scott was attacked and killed by dogs belonging to a family friend while in her home. The owner was injured in the incident. The dogs were euthanized.
January 29, 2024; February 2, 2024†	Harold Phillips	35	Male	Pit bull (3)	Detroit	Michigan	Phillips was attacked by three dogs while walking home from a bus stop. He died four days after the attack, and after having his arm amputated. The dogs had been involved in three previous dog bite cases, and were euthanized this time. The owners were both charged with "dangerous animal causing death". Harold's widow filed suit against the dog owners, Detroit Animal Care and Control, and several other organizations and individuals, claiming the city's no-kill model and avoidance of euthanasia created a dangerous environment for Detroiters.
January 31, 2024	William Mundine	85	Male	Pit bull (2)	Indianapolis	Indiana	Two loose dogs came into Mundine's backyard and attacked him. He suffered multiple bites on his arms and leg and died later in the hospital.
February 15, 2024	Dominic Cooper	35	Male	Pit bull (1+)	Compton	California	The dogs started fighting during feeding and turned on Cooper, their breeder. He was bitten in the leg and died in the kennel due to blood loss. His girlfriend found him the next day. Animal control euthanized 5 adult and 8 young dogs, with the approval of the victim's father.
February 26, 2024	Beau Clark	4	Male	Olde English Bulldogge (1)	Hartselle	Alabama	Clark was attacked by a neighbor's dog when he entered its yard. He was evacuated to the hospital where he died.
March 1, 2024	Mark Alan Partain	2	Male	Husky (1)*	New Hope	Alabama	Partain was found lifeless in front of his neighbor's dog pen. Animal control took possession of three dogs (German Shepherd mix, Husky and an unknown dog type) owned by 2 people. *According to one dog owner, only the Husky was involved in the attack. With the help of a forensic odontologist, authorities were able to rule out the involvement of two dogs, it was not officially revealed which dog was ultimately responsible. Two dog owners were subsequently indicted for the violation of "Emily's Law" (named after fatal dog attack victim Emily Mae Colvin) Alabama Code Title 3. Animals § 3-6A-5.
March 9, 2024	Daymon Balbuena	<1	Male	Pit bull (1)	Woodbridge Township	New Jersey	The attack happened at the family home in the early morning hours. The three-month-old baby died at the scene and his mother was seriously injured. The father was also treated at the hospital. The family dog was euthanized.
March 13, 2024	Lennox	1	Male	Pit bull - Dalmatian mix (2)	East Hartford	Connecticut	1-year-old baby Lennox and his mother were on a trampoline when they were attacked by the two family dogs, pit bull - Dalmatian mixes. The mother was injured and the boy died at hospital. The dogs were quarantined.
April 15, 2024	Shiraz Amal Asirvadam	1	Male	German Shepherd mix (3)	Duncanville	Texas	Asirvadam was attacked and killed by three dogs in his babysitter's home. The pets were confined outside but managed to enter the home where they attacked the child. He was taken to the hospital and pronounced dead. The babysitter was injured trying to stop the attack. Animal control took the dogs into custody.
April 28, 2024	Royal Bates	0.5	Male	Pit bull (1)	Marion	Ohio	Bates, a six-month-old infant, was attacked and killed by the family's pit bull, Kilo, in the home. The dog inflicted severe injuries, including a skull fracture. The parents were charged with involuntary manslaughter and child endangerment. Authorities noted the dog had previously attacked a neighbor's child.
May 24, 2024	Ezra Mansoor	<1	Male	Husky (1)	Knoxville	Tennessee	The 6-week-old infant was attacked by the family's dog while sleeping in its crib. The infant died in the hospital on May 30 from the injuries sustained in the attack. The family had owned the dog for eight years, and it had never shown signs of aggression prior to the attack.
June 2, 2024	Willard Norton	83	Male	Pit bull (2)	Town Creek	Alabama	While tending to the rose garden in his front yard, Norton was mauled to death by his neighbors' two pit bulls. In 2025 the neighbors, Jonathan Nix and Bridget Lamons, were arrested after a Lawrence County grand jury indicted them for reckless manslaughter.
July 19, 2024	Covil Lee Allen	3	Male	Pit bull (2)	Brooklyn Park	Minnesota	Covil was attacked by two pit bulls while accompanying his family to the dog owner's home to purchase dogs. Several adults tried to stop the dog attack with pick axes and hammers, and police ultimately shot both dogs. Covil died on July 29.
July 29, 2024	A'Daya Rain Fisher	2	Female	Rottweilers (3)	Houston	Texas	The toddler was attacked and killed by the dogs while inside her babysitter's house. Paramedics were unable to revive A'Daya when they arrived at the scene. She was then taken to the hospital where she was pronounced dead. The dogs were tested for rabies and euthanized.
August 3, 2024	Undisclosed	<1	Male	Pit bull (2)	Monroe County, Rochester	New York	A 3-month-old was attacked by 2 dogs at home and died at the hospital. The two dogs were removed by animal control and were expected to be euthanized after investigations were completed.
August 8, 2024	Davina Corbin	56	Female	Great Danes (7)	Feather Falls	California	Davina was fatally attacked by multiple dogs and found deceased on a trail with multiple bite wounds and injuries. A pack of up to 25 dogs, consisting of adult dogs and puppies, were found running loose nearby and neighbors reported that some of the dogs were aggressive. The 7 adult dogs involved in the attack were euthanized and the remaining 18 puppies were put up for adoption.
September 3, 2024	Undisclosed	1	Female	Pit bull (1−2)	Essex County, Newark	New Jersey	The 18-month-old died after being attacked by at least one of the two family dogs. The fatality was the second severe attack within a week in Essex County.
September 4, 2024	Zoey Hawkins	4	Female	Pit bull	Tulare County, Visalia	California	The girl was attacked by the family's dog. She died at the hospital.
October 7, 2024	Jiryiah Johnson	1	Male	Pit bull (3)	Bexar County,	Texas	A 1-year-old boy died at the hospital, hours after being attacked by pit bulls while at a babysitter's home. The babysitter had left the boy in the care of her 13-year-old daughter. The boy was in a bedroom with the teen girl, ostensibly "sequestered" from the dogs, when the animals suddenly forced their way in and began attacking. The dogs were later seized and euthanized. A Bexar County grand jury has indicted the babysitter on felony charges.
October 9, 2024	James Provost	59	Male	Pit bull mix (8–9)	Schenectady County, Albany County	New York	Provost was killed by a pack of dogs. The attack took place in a back yard adjacent to the dog owner's property. The man was pronounced dead at the scene. 9 adult dogs and 15 puppies were seized by Mohawk Hudson Humane Society.
March 30, 2025; April 2, 2025†	Kevin Renguul	43	Male	Unknown (5)	Tucson	Arizona	Renguul was attacked by a pack of five dogs. Renguul died three days later. The owner of the dogs, Martin Martinez, was arrested and charged with manslaughter.
July 30, 2025	Carter ?	5 months	Male	Great Dane/Husky (mix), 130 lb (59 kg)	Ormond Beach	Florida	Mother left 5-month-old Carter with relatives and went out for a birthday dinner. Great-aunt put Carter in a bedroom and then let her three dogs out of their kennels while she made tea and toast. Relatives saw the bedroom door was open, found Carter "bleeding and lifeless, and called 911. Despite efforts to save him, Carter died from his injuries. The dog was euthanized.
August 3, 2025	Teodora Mendoza	51	Female	Unknown	San Bernardino	California	Mendoza and another woman were attacked by a pack of dogs. She suffered from severe facial injuries and died after being transported to a hospital. Animal control later removed 14 dogs from the dog park.
November 21, 2025	Madison Hull	23	Female	Pit Bull (3)	Tyler, Smith County	Texas	While dog-sitting, Hull was letting the dogs back inside after they had gotten out when they attacked her. A neighbor heard the commotion and called 911. The deputy found Hull lying in the backyard while the dogs attacked her. When he attempted to retrieve her, the dogs charged at him. He shot one, prompting the other two to flee, and suffered minor injuries. He removed Hull from the backyard, and she died shortly thereafter from her injuries.
December 3, 2025	James Alexander Smith and granddaughter	50 & 3 months	Male & Female	Pit bull (2+?)	Tullahoma, Coffee County	Tennessee	James Alexander Smith and his 3-month granddaughter were attacked by at least 2 of the seven pit bulls owned by the family. They were dead at the scene. Some of the dogs were killed by police at the scene to reach the victims. The dogs were known by neighbors to often escape and attack other animals.

== See also ==
- List of fatal dog attacks (worldwide)
- Animal attack
- Beware of the dog
- Breed-specific legislation
- Dog aggression
- Dog behavior
- Dogs in the United States
