= Brindle (disambiguation) =

Brindle is a coat coloring pattern in animals.

Brindle may also refer to:

- Brindle (surname), people with the name
- Brindle, Lancashire, small village in England
- Brindle Cliffs, Antarctic Apennines, Antarctica
- Brindle Films, an Australian filmmaking company

== See also ==
- Treeing Tennessee Brindle, breed of dog
