= Cur =

Dog type

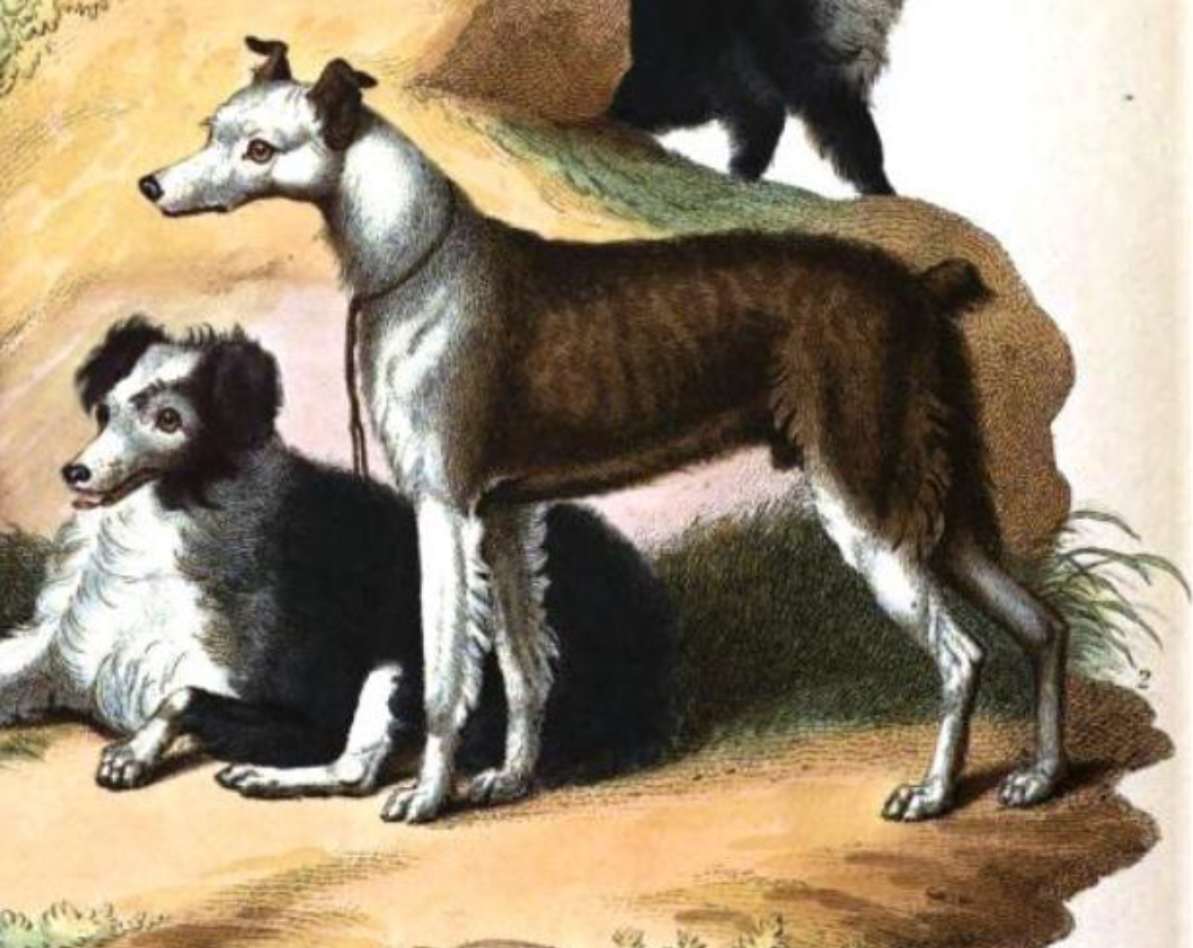
- Painting by Sydenham Edwards, 1800

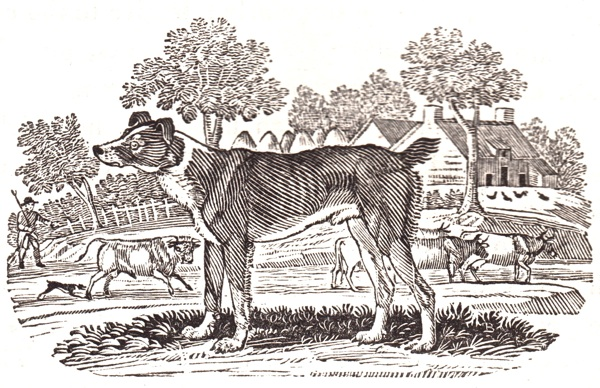
- Engraving by Thomas Bewick, 1791
- Other names: Cur dog, drover's dog
- Origin: England
- Breed status: Extinct
Traits
- Coat: Short and rough, feathered on legs
- Colour: Generally black, brindled or grizzled with white neck, legs and occasionally face

A cur was a dog breed used by cattle drovers in England. In the United States, a short-haired dog used in hunting and herding is called "cur-tailed", or "cur" for short.

In modern speech, the term cur is usually used to describe a mongrel dog, particularly if its temperament is unfriendly or aggressive. The term is believed to be derived from the Old Norse kurra, meaning 'to grumble or growl'. In Victorian speech, cur could be used as an insult.

== English cur ==
In England, the cur, also called the drover's dog, was a distinct breed of dog used by cattle drovers; they are now extinct. The cur was described by Ralph Beilby and Thomas Bewick in their 1790 work A general history of quadrupeds, as well as by Sydenham Edwards in his 1800 Cynographia Britannica, as dogs principally used by drovers to drive cattle. Curs were described as heelers, nipping the heels of cattle to make them move and ducking below the subsequent kick. They were said to be common in England, particularly the North of England, but were virtually unknown in the rest of the United Kingdom.

The cur was described as being larger, stronger and longer legged than shepherds' collies with shorter and smoother coats; in colour they were generally black, brindled, or grizzled with a white neck and legs and occasionally a white face, they had some feathering on their legs and half-pricked ears. A defining characteristic of the cur was that many were born with short, stumpy tails, which gave the appearance of their having been docked. Edwards described the breed's ancestry as likely a mixture of collie, lurcher, English Mastiff, or Great Dane. Their character was described as cunning, clever, ever busy and restless; it was said they could differentiate their master's cattle from those of strangers, and they would separate the strange cattle from their master's herds.

Although it is uncertain when or why the breed became extinct, it likely disappeared in the mid-19th century. Some modern writers believe it was the cur, not the collie, that was crossed with the dingo to create the now-extinct Halls Heeler in Australia. This would make the cur an ancestor of both the Australian Cattle Dog and the Australian Stumpy Tail Cattle Dog, the latter inheriting the cur's bobtail.

== American curs ==
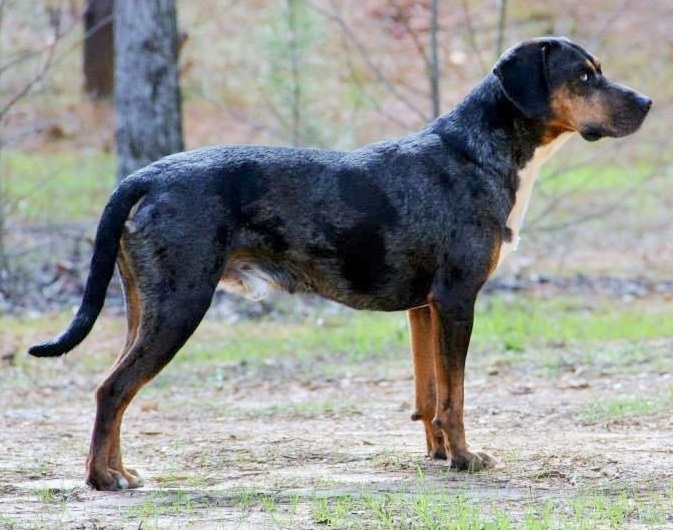
The Catahoula Leopard Dog, a recognized cur breed

In the United States, the term cur is also used to describe a distinctive type of short-haired dog that is used for both hunting and herding that was developed in the Southern United States. When describing these dogs, the term is actually an abbreviation of cur-tailed, as in a dog with a naturally occurring bobtail like that of the extinct English cur; many of the earlier examples of this type had a bobtail and some still do. A number of cur breeds have been standardised within the United States, some have been recognised by the United Kennel Club; these breeds include the Black Mouth Cur, the Blue Lacy, the Catahoula Leopard dog, the Mountain Cur, the Stephens Cur, the Treeing Cur, and the Treeing Tennessee Brindle.

These versatile dogs are used in a number of roles: for herding livestock, as well as trailing and locating lost livestock in thick scrubland; and in hunting a variety of game, including squirrels, opossums, raccoons, feral pigs, cougars, and American black bears, locating game both by sight and scent. While distinctive, American curs vary greatly in size; the various breeds and strains can be from 12 to 25 inches (30 to 64 cm) in height, and 40 to 95 pounds (18 to 43 kg) in weight.

== See also ==
- List of dog breeds
- List of extinct dog breeds
