= Bergeyella porcorum =

Scientific classification
- Domain: Bacteria
- Kingdom: Pseudomonadati
- Phylum: Bacteroidota
- Class: Flavobacteriia
- Order: Flavobacteriales
- Family: Weeksellaceae
- Genus: Bergeyella
- Species: B. porcorum

Binomial name
- Bergeyella porcorum Zamora et al. 2016

Type strain
- 1350-03, 612A-03, DICM11-00233-2A, DICM11-00234-2A, CCUG 67887, CECT 9006

Species of bacterium

Bergeyella porcorum is a Gram-negative bacterium from the genus Bergeyella. It has been isolated from the lungs and tonsils of pigs.
