= Stephens Stock =

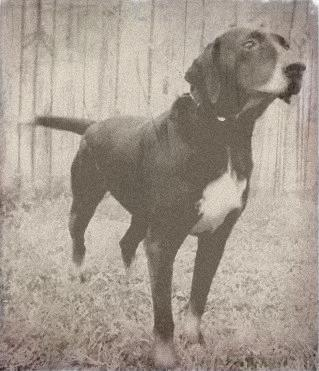
- Other names: Stephens Cur; Stephens Stock Mountain Cur
- Common nicknames: Little blacks
- Origin: United States
Traits
- Height: 16–23 in (41–58 cm)
- Weight: 35 to 55 lb (16 to 25 kg)
- Coat: Short
- Color: Black with white markings
Kennel club standards
- United Kennel Club: standard

The Stephens Stock, also known as the Stephens Stock Mountain Cur or simply the Stephens Cur, is a breed of cur from the United States.

== Overview ==
The Stephens Stock is a small, compact scent hound-like cur that stands between 16 and 23 inches (41 and 58 cm) in height and weighs between 35 and 55 pounds (16 and 25 kg). The breed has a short coat that is black in color with some white markings on the extremities, it has a small head with a narrow muzzle which gives the impression of a sleek hound. A high-energy breed, the Stephens Stock possesses strong hunting instincts and adapts poorly to being kept as a pet.

The Stephens Stock was developed by the Stephens family from southeast Kentucky who for over a century maintained a distinct line of Mountain Cur, eventually in 1970 it was determined that this line of dogs was so distinctive that it was declared to be a separate breed. Hugh Stephens is considered the founder of the modern breed, it was recognised by the United Kennel Club in 1998.

The Stephens Stock is predominantly used to hunt squirrel and raccoon; too small to hunt black bear and cougar singly, when hunted as a pack they are considered to have sufficient courage to take on either species.

== See also ==
- List of dog breeds
