= Bergeyella =

Scientific classification
- Domain: Bacteria
- Kingdom: Pseudomonadati
- Phylum: Bacteroidota
- Class: Flavobacteriia
- Order: Flavobacteriales
- Family: Weeksellaceae
- Genus: Bergeyella; Vandamme et al. 1994

Type species
- Bergeyella zoohelcum

Species
- B. cardium B. porcorum B. zoohelcum

Genus of bacteria

Bergeyella is a rod-shaped, Gram-negative, aerobic, non-spore-forming and non-motile genus from the family of Weeksellaceae.
