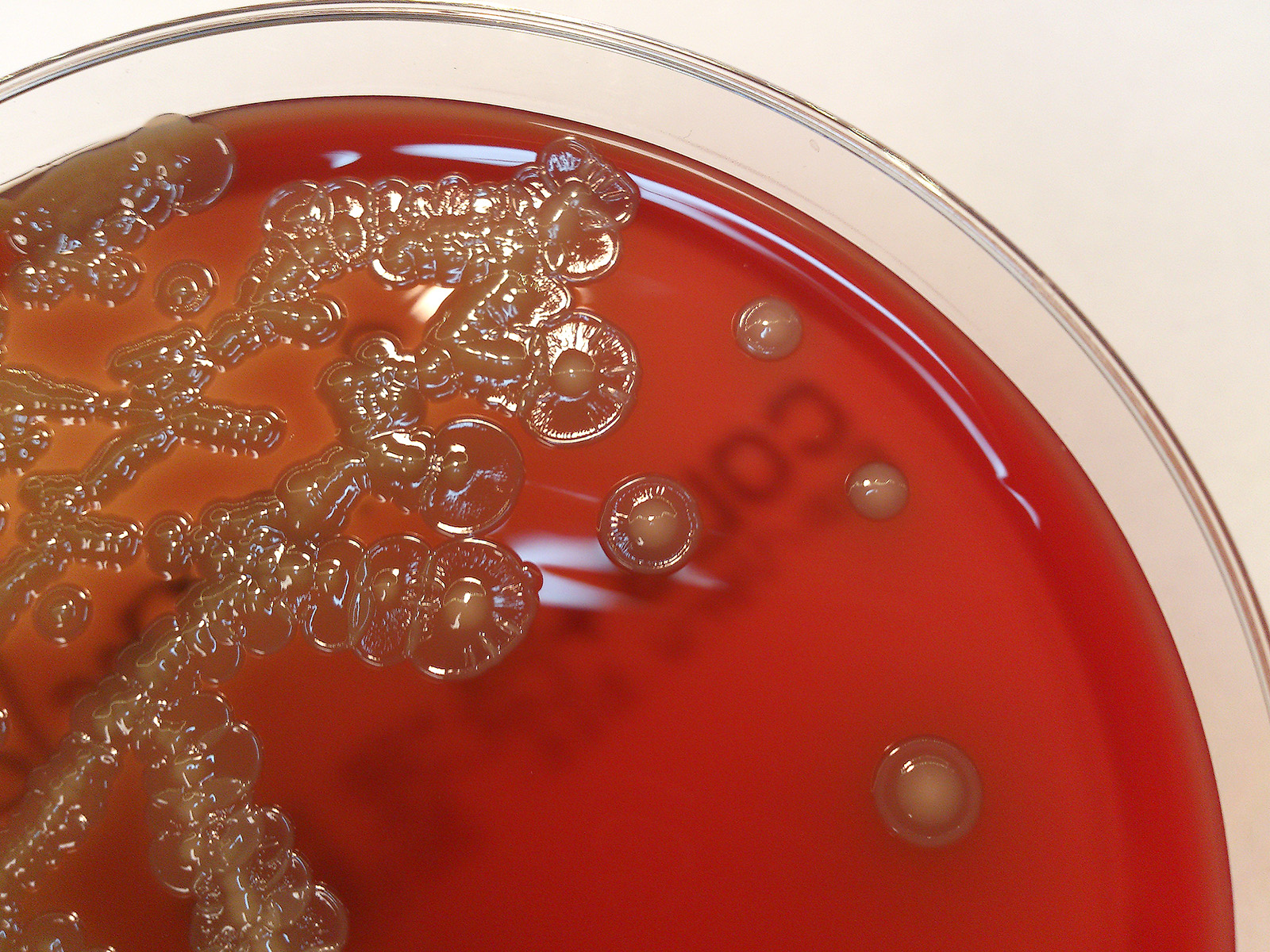

Scientific classification
- Domain: Bacteria
- Kingdom: Pseudomonadati
- Phylum: Bacteroidota
- Class: Flavobacteriia
- Order: Flavobacteriales
- Family: Weeksellaceae
- Genus: Bergeyella
- Species: B. zoohelcum

Binomial name
- Bergeyella zoohelcum (Holmes et al. 1987) Vandamme et al. 1994

Type strain
- ATCC 43767, CCUG 12568, CCUG 30535, CIP 103041

Synonyms
- Weeksella zoohelcum

= Bergeyella zoohelcum =

Species of bacterium

Bergeyella zoohelcum is a Gram-negative, rod-shaped, aerobic and non-motile bacterium from the genus Bergeyella which occurs in the upper respiratory tract of dogs and cats. Bergeyella zoohelcum has been associated with respiratory disease in cats and more recently in pigs. Bergeyella zoohelcum can cause infections after dog bites.

== Etymology ==
The genus name Bergeyella honors American bacteriologist David Hendricks Bergey (1860–1937), who was instrumental in the development of bacterial taxonomy and initiated the publication of Bergey’s Manual of Determinative Bacteriology. The species epithet zoohelcum is derived from Greek: zōion (ζῷον), meaning "animal", and helkos (ἕλκος), meaning "ulcer" or "sore", reflecting the bacterium’s original isolation from an infected animal bite wound.
