= Bergeyella cardium =

Scientific classification
- Domain: Bacteria
- Kingdom: Pseudomonadati
- Phylum: Bacteroidota
- Class: Flavobacteriia
- Order: Flavobacteriales
- Family: Weeksellaceae
- Genus: Bergeyella
- Species: B. cardium

Binomial name
- Bergeyella cardium Sohn et al. 2015

Type strain
- JCM 30115, NCCP 15908, 13-07

Species of bacterium

Bergeyella cardium is a bacterium from the genus of Bergeyella so named since it can sometimes be the cause of infective endocarditis.
