= Continental Bulldog =

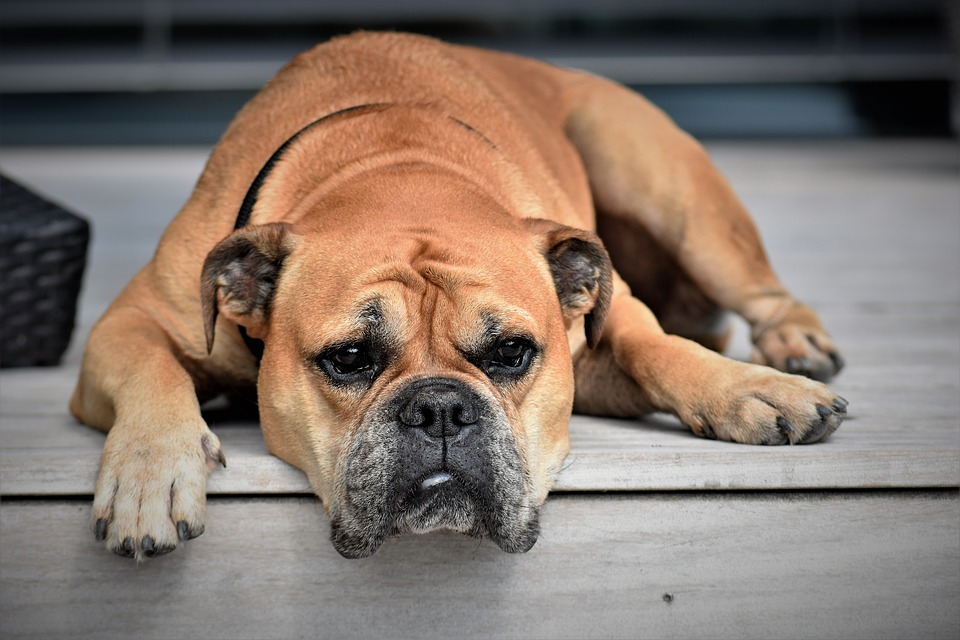
- Continental Bulldog
- Other names: Conti; Swiss Bulldog
- Origin: Switzerland
Traits
Height	Males	16.54-21.26 in (42–46 cm)
	Females	15.75-17.32 in (40–44 cm)
Weight	Males	55–66 lb (25–30 kg)
	Females	48.50–59.50 lb (22.00–26.99 kg)
- Coat: short, shiny, smooth
- Color: fawn or brindle, with or without black mask, with or without white
Kennel club standards
- Fédération Cynologique Internationale: standard

The Continental Bulldog, or Conti for short, is a newer dog breed created in Switzerland. It is officially recognized by the FCI since 2022.

== Breed creation and recognition ==
Imelda Angehrn of Switzerland, now nicknamed the "Grand Old Lady of the Bulldogs", grew up in a veterinarian and farmer household and started breeding Bulldogs in 1966. She was distressed that the Bulldog had so many health problems, including difficulties with breathing and whelping such big-headed broad-shouldered puppies through narrow female hips. Wanting bulldogs that were more mobile, able to breathe freely and give birth naturally, she started breeding lighter dogs, but they could not win at shows. After researching her options, she decided to start a new breed, including outcrossing with the Olde English Bulldogge. In 2001, her first EB x OEB crosses were born.

The Swiss Kennel Club permitted the creation of the new breed in September 2004 under the name the "Continental Bulldog". The Continental Bulldog Club of Switzerland was founded in 2004, and the breed, its standard, and the club were announced by the Swiss Kennel Club in 2005. At the club's founding meeting, it was announced that all of the dogs were to be entered into the Swiss Studbook and would be eligible to participate in international and national shows in Switzerland.

In order to be recognized by the international organization the Fédération Cynologique Internationale (FCI), it required eight bloodlines, in which the last three generations may not have a single common ancestor. Angehrn and the other club members set about breeding volumes of dogs, and by 2017 they had the eight bloodlines for a new breed in record time.

The "Conti", as it is affectionately known, is now officially recognized by the FCI.

== Appearance ==
A smooth-coated, almost square, medium-sized bulldog-type dog of athletic build. Despite his compact body, the Continental Bulldog is mobile and of staying power; his respiration even at full speed is noiseless. His weight, depending on his height, is between 20 and 30 kg. The head is less massive than that of the Bulldog. The forehead is flat to slightly domed, wrinkles existing but not too distinct. The underbite not so pronounced as that in the Bulldog. Short and strong, but not as short as to give the impression that the head sits directly on the shoulders. Well-arched neck line. Regular and fluid movement, good advancement of the forelegs, spacious thrust of the hind legs. The coat is smooth, short, with or without an undercoat. All colours which are accompanied by a dark nose are allowed: self-coloured, brindled or in combination with white, with or without black mask.

== See also ==
- List of dog breeds
- Olde English Bulldoge
