= Berry v. Superior Court =

1989 California Court of Appeal case

Berry v. Superior Court, 256 Cal. Rptr. 344 (1989), is an unofficially reported California Court of Appeal case. The case is relevant to the legal topic of criminal homicide and liability for unintentional killings.

== Background ==
In Berry v. Superior Court the defendant, Berry, was charged with the murder and negligent keeping of a mischievous animal which kills a human being (Pen. Code,§ 399); marijuana cultivation; and misdemeanor keeping of a fighting dog. This is a petition for a writ of prohibition seeking dismissal for the charges of murder and Penal Code section 399. Berry contended that the evidence presented at the preliminary hearing failed to establish implied malice; and there was no evidence that the animal was mischievous or was kept without ordinary care.

On June 13, 1987, Berry's pit bull dog killed 2 1/2 year old James Soto after the child had wandered into the area where "Willy" was tethered. The victim's parents had four other children and were warned by Berry about the dangerousness of Willy. The victim and his family lived on the same lot as Berry, and there was no enclosure around the dog. The dog was behind a six-foot fence, but the area was readily accessible to anyone.

There were 243 marijuana plants by Berry's house that could not be approached without crossing Willy's area. Berry bought the dog from a breeder of fighting dogs, and possessed considerable literature and equipment for dog fighting. "Willy" was known for his fighting abilities, his gameness, wind, and exceptionally hard bite. An animal control officer, who qualified as a fighting dog expert, testified that pit bull dogs are selectively bred to be aggressive towards other animals and that they are considered by animal control to be dangerous unless proven otherwise.

== Findings ==
The court used the test for implied malice in an unintentional killing to assess the merits of the defendants argument. Implied malice in an unintentional killing is an actual appreciation of a high risk that is objectively present. The act must be done with wanton disregard to life and with a base antisocial motive and a high probability that death will result.

The court found that Berry was aware of the dangerousness to human beings by his tethering of the dog, giving a warning to the parents that the dog was dangerous, his knowledge of the breed. The arguably antisocial purpose involved Berry owning a fighting dog and the apparent evidence that the dog was kept to guard illegal marijuana plants. The probability that death could result from Berry keeping the dog was found to be a question of fact for the jury to find. The writ of prohibition was denied.

Berry was convicted of involuntary manslaughter at trial, and sentenced to imprisonment for 3 years and 8 months.
