= Majestic Tree Hound =

- Origin: United States
- Breed status: Not recognized as a breed by any major kennel club.

The Majestic Tree Hound is a relatively modern variety of crossbred dog, belonging to the coonhound/bloodhound group. It is a large breed, with males averaging over 100 pounds. They have long low-set earage, heavy flew, and dewlap similar to their ancestors from the Ardennes. They carry more excess skin on average than the American Blue Gascon Hound. As a modern crossbreed, it is not formally recognized by the Fédération Cynologique Internationale.

== History ==
The creation of this breed is very recent, but the stem stock goes back to medieval northern France and the hounds of St. Hubert.

Big game hounds of the old Bloodhound/Talbot/St. Hubert type inhabited American soil for many years, and these were crossed with a variety of other hounds for coldtrailing work. The Majestic people say they crossed these Bloodhounds with "western big-game hounds." These dogs may have been of the Gascon type like the Old Line dogs or even strains from those long ago Porcelaines that went west with the Rousseau family.

Lee Newhart, Jr., and several others created the National Majestic Tree Hound Association in 1980 and registered the first hounds in that year.

== Health ==
There have been some findings of hip dysplasia as well as the ears needing to be cleaned frequently.

== Activities ==
Intended for rugged terrain and long endurance, they are most suited for tracking lions, bears, bobcats and jaguars
