= Partlow, Virginia =

- Unincorporated community
- Location within Northern Virginia Location within Virginia Location within the United States
- Coordinates: 38°2′19″N 77°38′20″W
- Country: United States
- State: Virginia
- County: Spotsylvania

Area
  - Total: 0.43 sq mi (1.12 km^{2})

Population (2000)
  - Total: 2,083
  - Density: 4,820/sq mi (1,860/km^{2})
- Time zone: UTC−5 (Eastern (EST))
  - Summer (DST): UTC−4 (EDT)
- ZIP codes: 22534

Partlow is an unincorporated community in Spotsylvania County in the U.S. state of Virginia. Partlow is a small rural community located between Jefferson Davis Highway (U.S. 1) and Lake Anna. It sits at an elevation of 400 feet, and appears on the Lake Anna East U.S. Geological Survey Map. Partlow's zip code is 22534, and as of the 2000 census, it had a population of 2,083. Partlow is located 31 miles northwest of the city of Richmond.

Originally, the area was termed "Pea Ridge" and was the site of a slave auction. Part of the original slave block still rests directly on Rt. 738 between the Partlow Post Office and Mt. Olive Rd (Rt. 658).

A tavern, called "The Partlow Tavern", was established by Capt. John C. Partlow on the same corner as the slave block. Partlow is also home to Wallers Baptist Church, a historically notable church founded in 1769, known for the notorious persecutions against its founding pastor, John "Swearing Jack" Waller, by the Church of England. Capt. Partlow and Benjamin Waller, a descendant of John Waller, were also persecuted for their religion and briefly jailed at one point for having services in their homes.

In the early 19th century, Benjamin Waller and John Partlow worked together to form the first Partlow Post Office. The family farm was sold in 2018. The last direct descendant bearing the Partlow name, Anne Partlow Pemberton, died in January 2004.

Partlow's primary significance in popular culture is as the location of the plantation where the fictional character Kunta Kinte was enslaved.
