= Dog bite =

Bite by a dog on a person or other animal

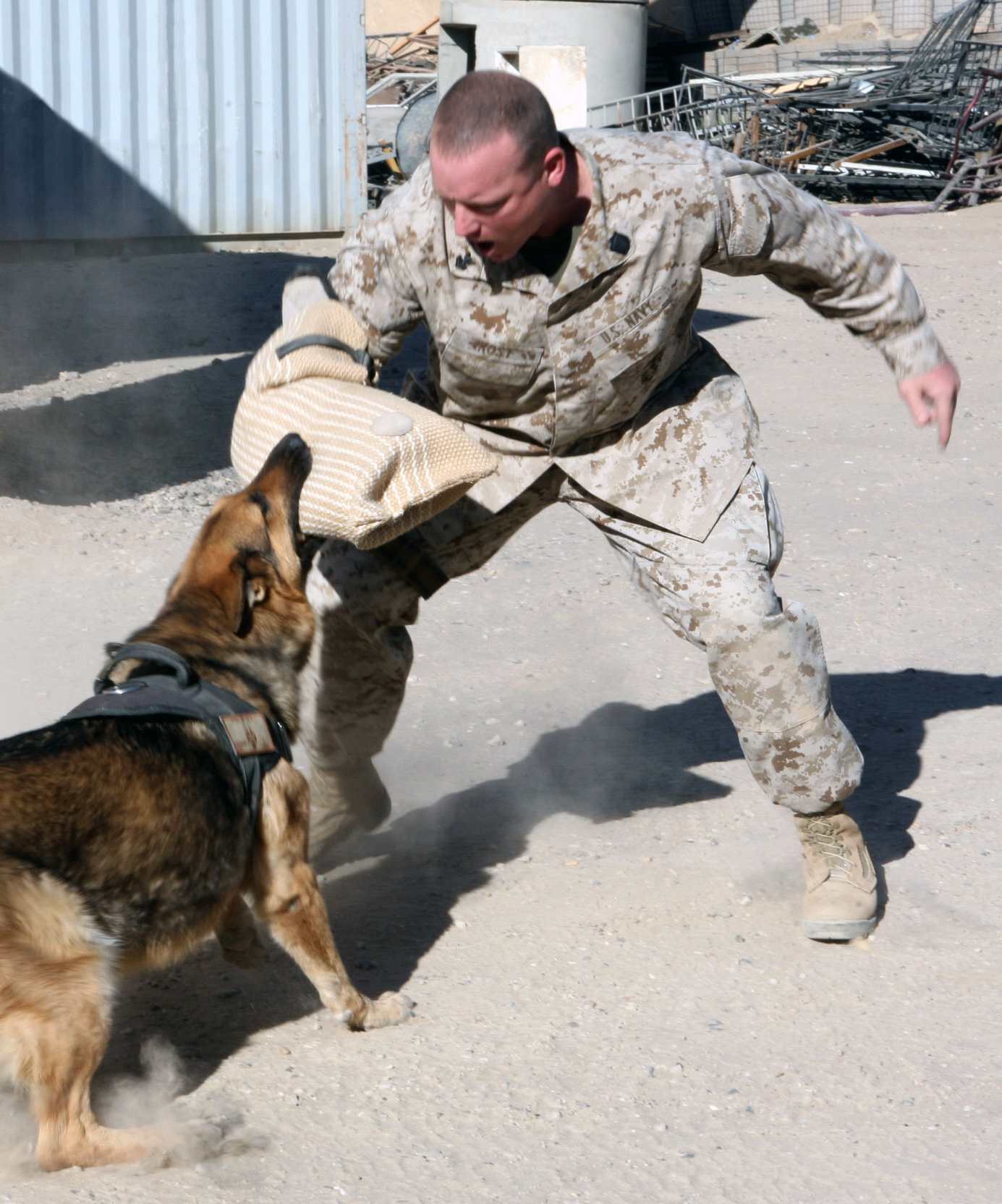
- Dog biting a training sleeve
- Specialty: Trauma medicine; Emergency medicine; Plastic surgery; Pediatrics

A dog bite is a bite upon a person or other animal by a dog. A dog bite may be referred to as a dog attack, although dog attacks can include non-bite injuries. Though some dog bites do not result in injury, they can result in infection, disfigurement, temporary or permanent disability, or death. Another type of dog bite is the "soft bite" displayed by well-trained dogs, by puppies, and in non-aggressive play. Dog bites can occur during dog fighting, as a response to mistreatment, by trained dogs working as guard, police or military animals, or during a random encounter.

There is debate on whether or not certain breeds of dogs are inherently more prone to commit attacks causing serious injury (i.e., so driven by instinct and breeding that, under certain circumstances, they are exceedingly likely to attempt or commit dangerous attacks). It is recognized that the risk of dog bites can be increased by human actions such as abuse or bite training, or through inaction such as neglect, carelessness in confinement or lack of control.

Significant dog bites affect tens of millions of people globally each year. It is estimated that 2% of the U.S. population, 4.5–4.7 million people, are bitten by dogs each year. Most bites occur in children, with nearly half of all children in the U.S. being bitten by a dog at least once by the age of 12. In the 1980s and 1990s, the U.S. averaged 17 deaths per year. Between 2011 and 2021 approximately 468 people were killed by dog bites in the United States, averaging 43 deaths per year. Between 2018 and 2021, deaths were more than doubled for both males (age 15 to 37) and females (age 20 to 44). Animal bites, most of which are from dogs, are the reason for 1% of visits to emergency departments in the United States.

== Cause ==
=== Breeds ===
All dog breeds can inflict a bite; breed is not an accurate predictor of whether or not a dog will bite. In the US, pit bull-type and Rottweilers are the most frequently identified breeds in cases of severe bites. In a study comparing media accounts of 256 dog bite related deaths 2000–2009, when a strict definition was used ("documented pedigree, parentage information, or DNA test results or based on concordance among media breed descriptor, animal control breed descriptor, and the veterinarian-assigned breed from a photograph") the resulting 45 dogs comprised 20 recognized breeds and 2 known crosses. The study also published information comparing when multiple media reports (or media reports compared with animal control reports) differed in reporting the breeds. When using a strict definition ("Rottweiler" is not equal to "Rottweiler-mix"), 30%-40% of the reports varied. When using a less strict definition ("Rottweiler" and "Rottweiler-mix" are equal enough) only 12%-15% of the reports varied.

A 2000 study by the Centers for Disease Control and Prevention (CDC) of human fatalities from dog bites during the twenty years 1979–1998, reported that pit bull-type dogs and Rottweilers were involved in more than half of the deaths. Published in the Journal of the American Veterinary Medical Association, the AVMA's opinion was that the study could not be used to infer any breed-specific risk for dog bite fatalities without also noting the numbers of each breed residing in the US.

=== Dog behavior ===
In isolation, predatory behaviors are rarely the cause of an attack on a human. Predatory aggression is more commonly involved as a contributing factor for example in attacks by multiple dogs; a "pack kill instinct" may arise if multiple dogs are involved in an attack.

== Prevention ==
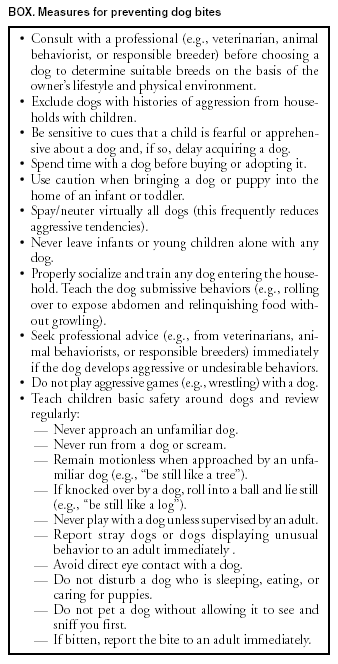
Measures for preventing dog bites

Dog bite prevention is the effort to prevent people from being attacked and bitten by dogs. Legislative bodies have addressed concerns about dog bites that include licensing laws, statutes outlawing organized dogfights, and leash laws. Breed-Specific Legislation (BSL) has been enacted in some areas, limiting the ownership and activities of dogs perceived to be more likely to bite and attack. Dog breeds targeted by breed-specific regulations include Rottweilers, American Staffordshire Bull Terriers ("Pit Bulls"), Chow Chows, German Shepherds, and Doberman Pinschers. Additional preventive measures include proper containment, signage, and responsible pet ownership.

Some people, like the very young or the very old, are more susceptible to being bitten and therefore may need additional methods of prevention. Experts have advised parents not to leave infants or young children alone with any dog, and have also advised parents to teach children not to approach an unfamiliar dog, not to run from a dog or scream, and not to play with a dog unless supervised by an adult.

Dogs can be extremely territorial and protective. Dogs can attack anyone who poses a threat to their companions, whether humans, other dogs, or even cats. Dogs can rival bears and big cats in ferocity when confronting burglars, even if they are ordinarily docile.

In addition to causing pain, injury, or nerve damage, almost one out of five bites becomes infected. Those who work and live around dogs have been advised to be aware of the risk and take precautions. Rabies is a particular risk associated with dog bites. According to the World Health Organization, 99% of the human rabies cases are caused by dogs. In the United States between tens of thousands of individuals receive pre- and post-exposure prophylaxis against the rabies virus each year. Following a bite, local animal control agencies or police may attempt to capture and assess the animal to determine rabies risk.

Dog bite prevention includes public health strategies aimed at reducing both injury and transmission of infections such as rabies. The WHO recommends vaccinating dogs against rabies, supervising pets and avoiding contact with unfamiliar or aggressive animals. Following a bite, immediate and thorough washing of the wound with soap and water is strongly recommended, as this can significantly reduce the risk of infection. Prompt medical evaluation is essential to determine need for post-exposure prophylaxis (PEP), which included rabies vaccination and immunoglobulin. PEP is highly effective in preventing rabies if administered before the onset of symptoms. It can be fatal once symptoms appear but is preventable in a timely fashion. Globally, dog bites are primary source of rabies transmission to humans particularly in regions where canine rabies remains endemic.

Identifying the risk of being bitten by a dog can prevent an attack and subsequent injury or death. Infants and children are more likely to be bitten. Small children can be attacked if they approach or play with a dog when they are not supervised. Among children, the rate of dog-bite–related injuries is highest for those five to nine years old. Children are more likely than adults to need medical attention for dog bites. Men are more likely than women to be bitten by a dog. Over half of dog-bite injuries occur in the home. Having a dog in the household is associated with a higher likelihood of being bitten than not having a dog. As the number of dogs in the home increases, so does the likelihood of being bitten. Adults with two or more dogs in the household are five times more likely to be bitten than those living without dogs at home.

The behavior of a dog may not always indicate its friendliness or likelihood of biting. This is because when a dog wags its tail, most people interpret this as the dog expressing happiness and friendliness. Though indeed tail wagging can express these positive emotions, tail wagging is also an indication of fear, insecurity, anxiety, challenging of dominance, establishing social relationships, or a warning that the dog may bite.

== Health effects ==
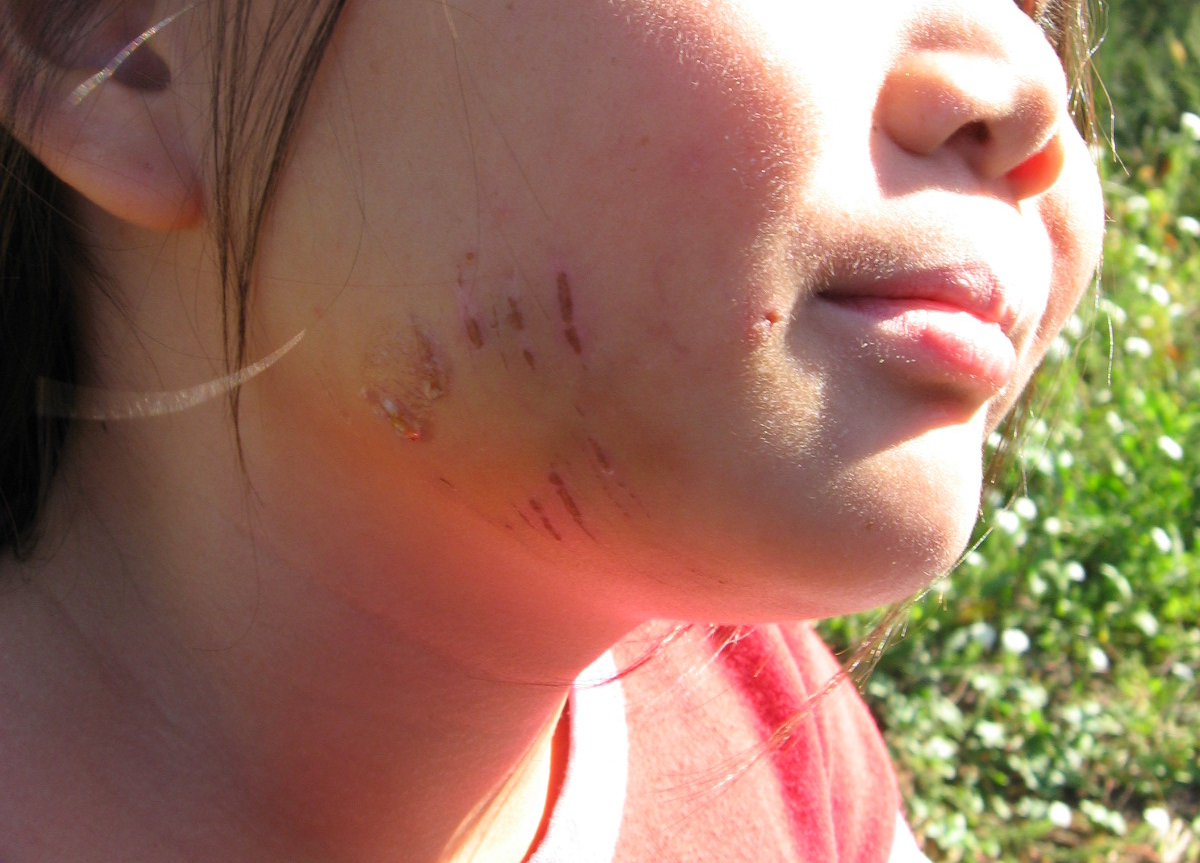
Wound on a child received from a dog bite

Rabies results in the death of approximately 55,000 people per year, with most of the cases due to dog bites. Capnocytophaga canimorsus, MRSA, tetanus, and Pasteurella can be transmitted from a dog to someone bitten by the dog. Bergeyella zoohelcum is an emerging infection transmitted through dog bites. Infection with B. zoohelcum from dog bites can lead to bacteremia.

== Treatment ==
When a person receives a dog bite where the skin is broken, the risk of a serious infection can be reduced by cleaning the wound and getting appropriate health care treatment. It is important to find out if the dog's rabies vaccinations are current. A Cochrane review found that there is not much evidence for or against current practices of keeping dog bite wounds left open to heal for a short time before closure (delayed closure) or not stitched at all (no closure) over immediate closure by stitching.

== Epidemiology ==
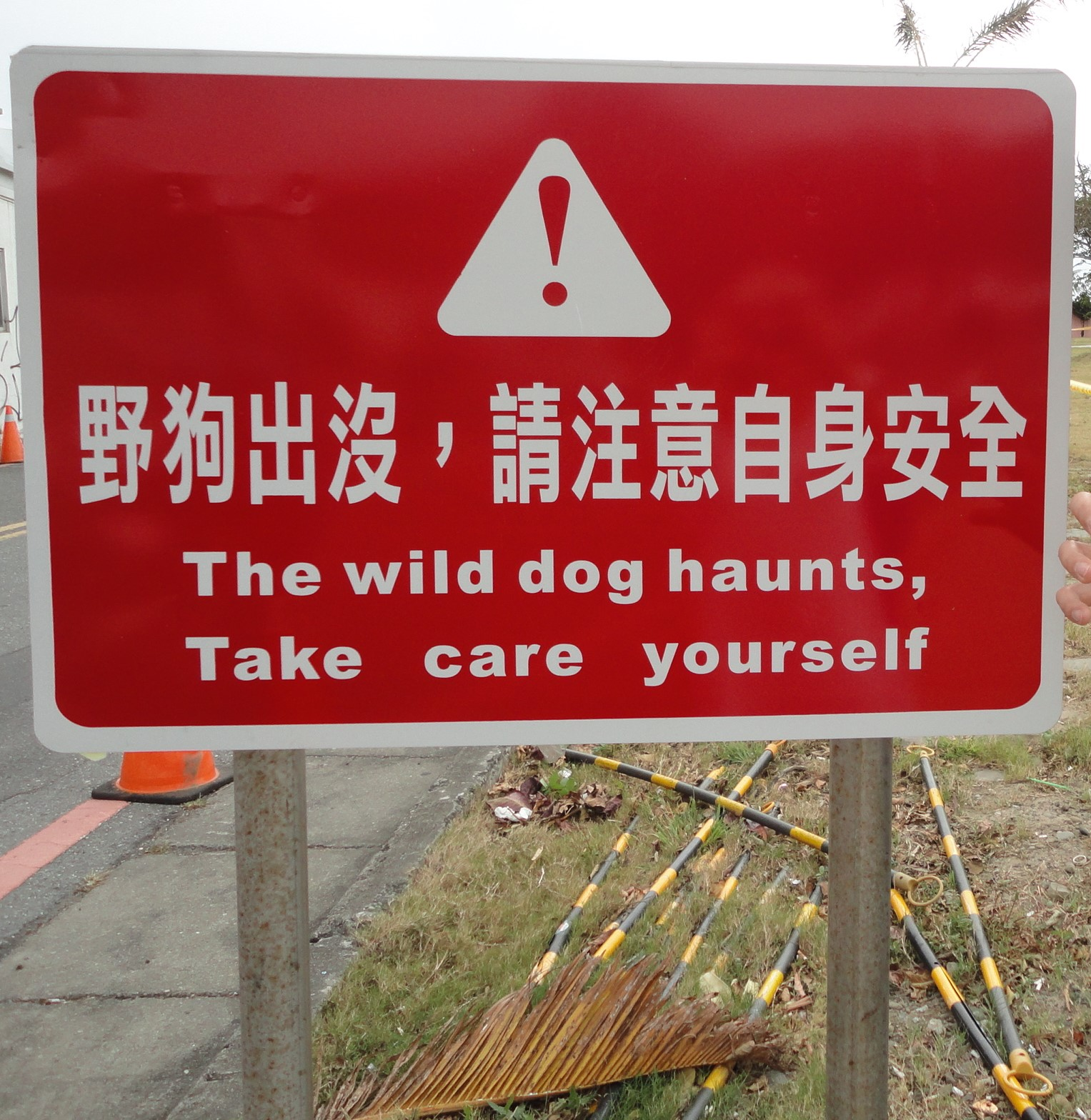
A stray dog warning sign in Taiwan

Significant dog bites affect tens of millions of people globally each year. It is estimated that 1.5–2 percent of the US population, from 4.5 to 4.7 million people, are bitten by dogs yearly. Most bites occur in children. Over half of dog bite injuries occur at home with familiar dogs, and having a dog in the household is linked to a higher likelihood of being bitten than not having a dog. As the number of dogs in the home increases, so does the likelihood of being bitten. Dog bites may transmit zoonotic infections, which may also result in illness or death. Dogs are the primary source of rabies transmission to humans. Information on the extent of traumatic injuries from dog attacks is incomplete, and the number of bites is thought to be underreported. In a survey of dog bites in Pennsylvania, the rate of dog bites was 36 times higher than what had been reported to authorities. According to national estimates, almost 1,000 persons per day are seen in US emergency departments for dog bites. It has been estimated that 1 out of 2 people will sustain a dog-related injury during his lifetime. Most victims are involved in normal, apparently nonprovoking activities before dog attacks.

Animal bites, most of which are from dogs, are the reason for 1% of visits to an emergency department in the United States. Some people, like the very young or the very old, are more susceptible to being bitten by a dog. From 1979 through 1994 there were approximately 279 deaths related to dog attacks in the United States.

More serious injuries from dogs are often described in the media. In 2010, more people were killed by dogs (34) than were hit by lightning (29). Emergency department visits and treatment by those bitten number in the thousands.

=== Australia ===
On average, 2,061 people received treatment for dog bite injuries each year between 2001 and 2013.

=== Austria ===
About 5,900 Austrians are treated annually after being bitten by dogs. One-fifth of those injured are children.

=== United States ===
In the United States, approximately 4.5 million people are bitten by dogs each year. Approximately twenty percent of dog bites become infected.

In a survey of dog bites in Pennsylvania, the rate of dog bites was 36 times higher than what had been reported to authorities. According to national estimates, almost 1,000 persons per day are seen in emergency departments for dog bites. It has been estimated that 1 out of 2 people will have a dog-related injury during their lifetime.

== Legal issues ==
Dog owners may be legally liable for the bites and injuries that their dog causes to people or other dogs. In addition, states and local governments have passed laws and ordinances that allow the government to take action against dogs that are considered dangerous. In some cases, a dog owner may be criminally prosecuted for a dog attack on another person. Homeowner's insurance policies typically provide some liability coverage for dog bites that occur on the insured properties.

=== United States ===
All US states recognize that a dog owner may be potentially liable for dog bites. Depending on the state, the rules for when a dog owner may be liable for a bite will vary. Models of liability for dog bites fall into three broad categories:

- Common law. At common law, a dog owner can be held liable for the injury caused by a dog that the owner knows, or has reason to know, may be dangerous. Many common law jurisdictions have historically recognized a "one bite" rule, meaning that, absent information that suggests that a dog may be unusually dangerous to others, a dog owner cannot be held liable for the first bite injury caused by their dog.
- Strict liability. States that impose strict liability make the owner of a dog liable for injuries caused by a dog, without further consideration of the facts. Strict liability laws may require that the person seeking damages for a dog bite prove that they were acting peacefully and lawfully at the time of the bite. The law may also recognize a limited range of defenses to liability, such as the dog owner successfully proving that the injured person was trespassing at the time of the injury or had engaged in conduct that provoked the attack. As of 2023, thirty-six states impose some form of strict liability for dog attacks.
- Mixed law. Many states take a mixed approach, passing statutes that are based upon the common law but that add additional elements that must be proven for a dog bite injury to succeed in an injury claim, or provide defenses not available at common law.

The United States is not receptive to the idea that the dog itself can be criminally liable for a bite. A California court explained that, although the tendency to anthropomorphize animals is understandable, especially with beloved pets like dogs, the law does not recognize dogs as having the mental state that can incur criminal liability. That is, although dogs and other animals may have the capacity to commit vicious and violent acts, they do not possess the legal ability to commit crimes.

States that have enacted legislation that assigns liability include Michigan, Rhode Island, Florida, California, and Texas.

== See also ==
- List of fatal dog attacks
- Animal attack
- Beware of the dog
- Breed-specific legislation
- Cat bite
- Coyote attack
- Dingo attack
- Dog aggression
- Dog behavior
- Dogs in the United States
- Man bites dog
- Rabies
- Wolf attacks on humans
