= Brindle Cliffs =

The Brindle Cliffs (69°23′S 68°33′W) are a precipitous mass of ice-free rock rising to 610 metres (2,000 ft), standing 6 nautical miles (11 km) east of Cape Jeremy on the west coast of the Antarctic Peninsula. The feature was first seen from the air and photographed on August 16, 1936, by the British Graham Land Expedition under Rymill, and surveyed in 1948 by the Falkland Islands Dependencies Survey who so named it because of its brindle color.
