= Treeing Tennessee Brindle =

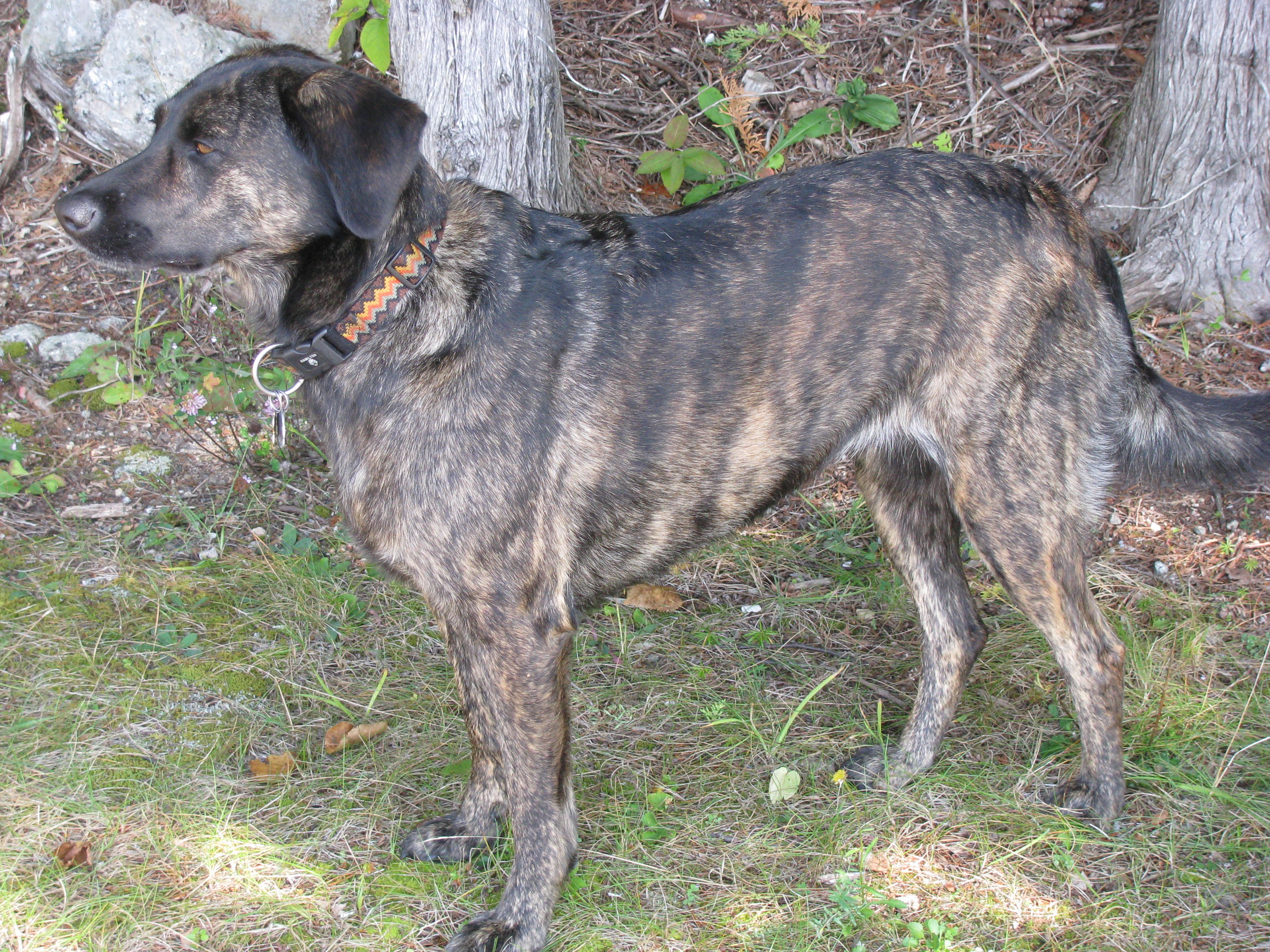
- Origin: United States
- Breed status: Not recognized as a breed by any major kennel club.
Traits
Height	Males	18 to 24 in (46 to 61 cm)
	Females	16 to 22 in (41 to 56 cm)
Weight	Males	35 to 50 lb (16 to 23 kg)
	Females	30 to 40 lb (14 to 18 kg)
- Coat: Short and soft
- Color: Brindle or black with brindle trim

The Treeing Tennessee Brindle is a breed of cur. Since 1995, its records have been maintained through the American Kennel Club's Foundation Stock Service Program.

== History ==
The Treeing Tennessee Brindle's development began in the early 1960s with the efforts of Reverend Earl Phillips. Because of a column he was then writing in a hunting dog magazine, Phillips became aware of the existence of brindle curs—hunting and treeing dogs with brown coats, "tiger-striped" with black. He contacted their owners and fanciers, discovering that the type was highly regarded for its abilities, and in 1967 contacted them again to form an organization to "preserve and promote" the brindle cur. The Treeing Tennessee Brindle Breeders Association was established in Illinois on March 21. Foundation stock was obtained from various locations in the United States, particularly those between the Ozarks and Appalachian Mountains. The Treeing Tennessee Brindle's records have been maintained through the American Kennel Club's Foundation Stock Service Program since 1995.

== Description ==
=== Appearance ===
Males stand 18 to 24 inches (46 to 61 cm) at the withers and weigh 35 to 50 pounds (16 to 23 kg), while females stand 16 to 22 inches (41 to 56 cm) tall and weigh 30 to 40 pounds (14 to 18 kg). The breed's coat is short and soft and may be either brindle or black with brindle trim. Small white markings on the chest and feet are permissible according to the breed standard, as are dewclaws.

=== Temperament ===
The Treeing Tennessee Brindle has a strong propensity for hunting, particularly treeing, and tends to be intelligent and fast with a keen sense of smell. Additionally, the way it bays during the hunt ("crying" or "giving tongue") is part of the breed standard: individuals should be "open trailers with change over at tree", and a "coarse chop" is preferred.

== See also ==
- List of dog breeds
