= Mountain Cur =

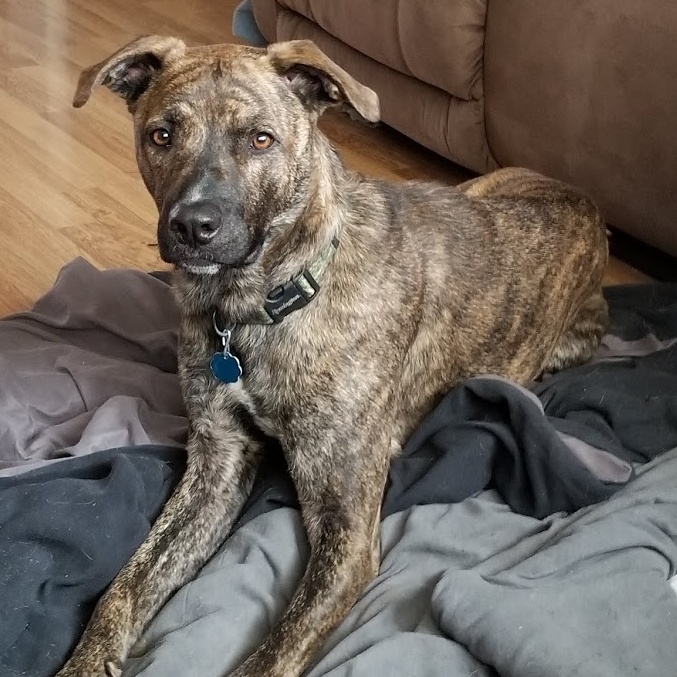
- A young Mountain Cur
- Origin: United States
Traits
Height	Males	18–26 in (46–66 cm)
	Females	16–24 in (41–61 cm)
- Weight: 30–60 lb (14–27 kg)
Kennel club standards
- United Kennel Club: standard

The Mountain Cur is a type of working dog that is bred specifically for treeing and trailing small game, like squirrel and raccoons. They are also used for hunting and baying big game like bear and wild boar as well as being an all-purpose farm dog. Curs are a member of the Hound group, and the Mountain Cur is one of several varieties of cur. It can also be used as a water dog. Mainly bred in Ohio, Kentucky, Virginia, and Tennessee, it has been registered with the United Kennel Club since 1998 and has since been recognised by the American Kennel Club, the National Kennel Club and the Continental Kennel Club. The Mountain Cur Breeders' Association was formed in 1957.

== History ==
The Mountain Cur was brought to America nearly two hundred years ago from Europe by the settlers of the mountains in Ohio, Virginia, Kentucky, and Tennessee, then later Arkansas and Oklahoma, to guard family and property as well as chase and tree game. These dogs enabled the European settlers to provide meat and pelts for personal use or trade, making them valuable in the frontier. With the advent of World War II, many of the families who had bred them left rural areas to work in factories in the war effort. By the end of the 1940s the breed was becoming rare. Four individuals, Hugh Stephens and Woody Huntsman of Kentucky, Carl McConnell of Virginia, and Dewey Ledbetter of Tennessee are given credit for saving the breed from dying out and setting the Mountain Cur breed standard. In 1956, these four founded the Original Mountain Cur Breeders' Association. Soon after, controversy over the breed standard caused Hugh Stephen and Carl McConnell to leave the OMCBA to found the Stephen Stock Mountain Cur Association.

Explorer and frontiersman of the Appalachian mountains Daniel Boone bred and raised Mountain Curs. Like many other settlers of early America, he heavily relied on the breed while blazing trails through the Appalachians, providing protection to his family and helping hunt wild game. He is said to have even carried young pups in protective baskets while on these expeditions.

In the 1980s and 1990s, the Mountain View Cur was developed from the Mountain Cur by Michael and Marie Bloodgood of Afton, New York.

== Description ==
=== Appearance ===
Mountain Curs are short-coated dogs which come in blue, black, yellow, brown, or brindle coloration. Some individuals will also show white markings on the face or chest. The weight is usually between 30 and 60 pounds, and height is 18-26 inches for males and 16-24 inches for females.

=== Temperament ===
Mountain Curs are intelligent, easily trained, and neither vicious nor shy. They are known to try to please their humans and are able to get along well with children and other pets. Since these curs were bred to work, if deprived of the opportunity to hunt, guard, or work around a farm, they will sometimes grow anxious and bored. However, when they have a job to do, they are generally happy and obedient.

=== Health ===
Mountain Curs can live up to 14–16 years, and there are no reported breed-specific health issues.

== See also ==
- List of dog breeds
