= Olde English Bulldogge =

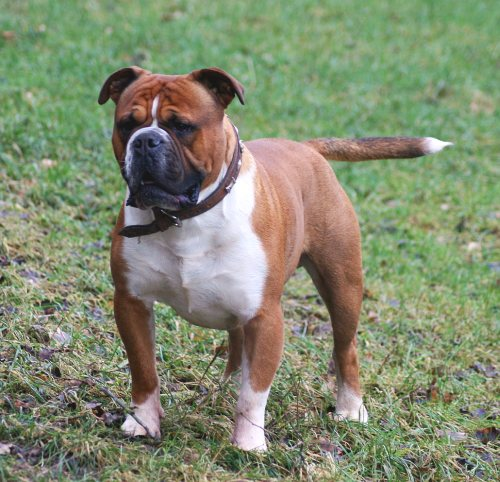
- UKC Olde English Bulldogge male
- Origin: United States
Traits
Height	Males	17–20 in (43–51 cm)
	Females	16–19 in (41–48 cm)
Weight	Males	60–80 lb (27–36 kg)
	Females	50–70 lb (23–32 kg)
- Coat: Short, tight and medium to short
- Color: Brindle, of red, fawn, or black; either solid or pied: white, fawn, red, black.
Kennel club standards
- United Kennel Club: standard

The Olde English Bulldogge is an American dog breed, recognized by the United Kennel Club (UKC) in January 2014. The breed is listed in the UKC Guardian Dog Group. Five years prior to UKC recognition, the breed was registered by the former Canine Developmental, Health and Performance Registry (CDHPR), a privately held business located in Kalamazoo, Michigan. In the early 2000s, CDHPR had been working with the UKC under a unique agreement to develop breeding plans and strategies in an effort to produce improved breeds of dogs that would be accepted as purebred and, therefore, eligible for UKC registration.

In the early 1970s, dog breeder David Leavitt of Coatesville, Pennsylvania, wanted to "recreate a Bulldog with the looks, health and athleticism of the 18th Century Bulldog which was originally created for the English sport of bull baiting between the years 1100 to 1835". In an effort to rapidly achieve his goal for a purebred dog, Leavitt modeled his program after a livestock line breeding scheme developed by Nathan Fechimer, a professor in the Department of Dairy Science, Ohio State University. The result was an athletic breed that looks similar to the bulldogs of 1820, but with a friendly temperament, fewer health issues, and with longevity reaching into the teens. U.S. researchers have said the Olde English Bulldogge is a "viable candidate" as an outcross on which to rebuild the Bulldog; a breed that genetic studies have suggested is so inbred that it "cannot be returned to health without an infusion of new bloodlines."

== History ==
The Olde English Bulldogge was an attempt to recreate the "Regency Period Bull Baiter" and was developed in the early 1970s by David Leavitt, of Coatesville, Pennsylvania, in the United States. Leavitt began his project in 1971 utilizing the cattle line breeding scheme of Dr. Fechimer from Ohio State University. The goal was to create a dog with the look, health, and athleticism of the original bull-baiting dogs, but with a much less aggressive temperament. The foundation crosses consisted of one-half Bulldog, one-sixth American Bulldog, one-sixth Bullmastiff and one-sixth of other breeds. After many planned crosses, the Olde English Bulldogge emerged and began to breed true.

Leavitt formed the Olde English Bulldogge Association (OEBA) to maintain the breed's stud book and issue registration papers to future offspring. During the 1980s, Ben and Karen Campetti from Sandisfield, Massachusetts, worked closely with Leavitt in breeding the Olde English Bulldogge. In 1993, Leavitt stopped breeding and turned the OEBA registry as well as his personal breeding stock over to Working Dog Inc. which was owned and operated by Michael Walz of Pennsylvania.

In 2001 the Olde English Bulldogge Kennel Club (OEBKC) was formed, and in 2005 David Leavitt was involved with merging the Olde English Bulldogge Association's registry with that of the OEBKC's. The Olde English Bulldogge was enrolled with the Canine Developmental Health and Performance Registry (CDHPR) in August 2008 in order to evaluate the breed for recognition within the UKC as a purebred breed of dog. In 2013, the UKC announced that the Olde English Bulldogge would become a fully recognized breed as of January 1, 2014. The OEBKC is currently the recognized Parent Club for the breed with the United Kennel Club (UKC).

=== Leavitt Bulldog ===
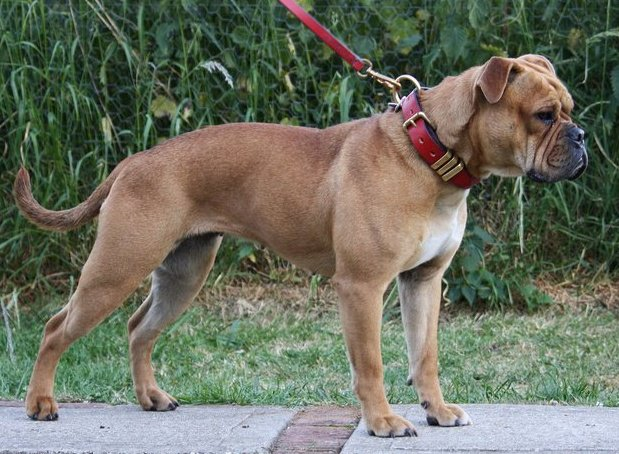
Leavitt Bulldog

In order to maintain his original breeding aims and to distinguish his line of Olde English Bulldogges from those of other breeders, in 2004 David Leavitt named his line of dogs Leavitt Bulldogs (sometimes spelled "Bulldogges"), founding the Leavitt Bulldog Association the following year. The UKC recognizes dogs registered with the Leavitt Bulldog Association as Olde English Bulldogges, along with those registered with the Olde English Bulldogge Kennel Club and the Olde Bulldogge Club Europe.

== Appearance ==
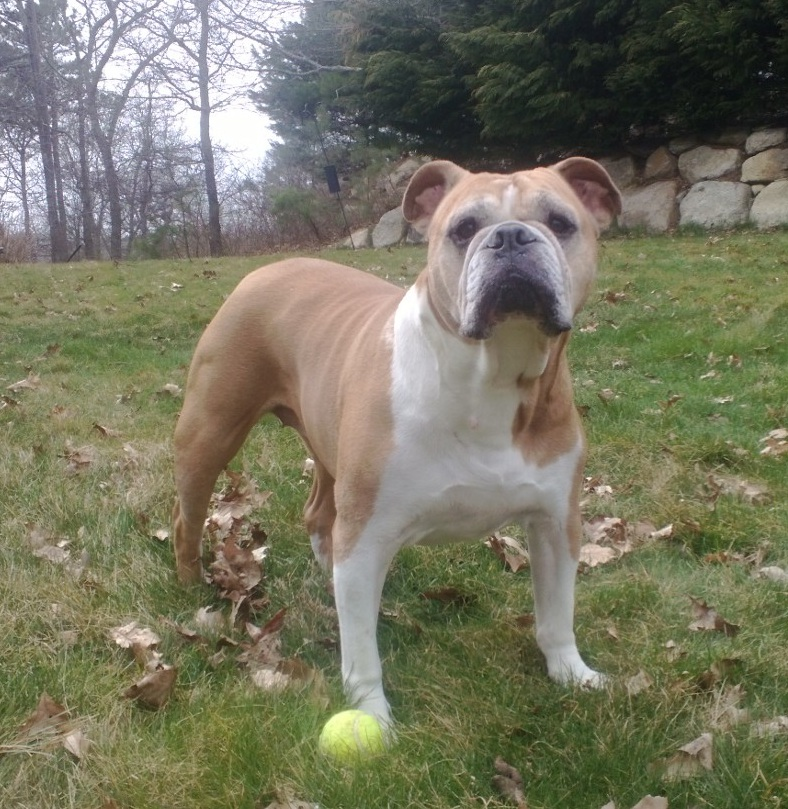
UKC Olde English Bulldogge female at 8 years old

The Olde English Bulldogge is a muscular, medium-sized dog of great strength, and possessor of fluid, agile movement. They are well-balanced and proportioned, while appearing capable of performing without any breathing restrictions in either heat or in cold. Serious Faults: Excessive wrinkle, lack of pigment around eyes, nose or mouth.

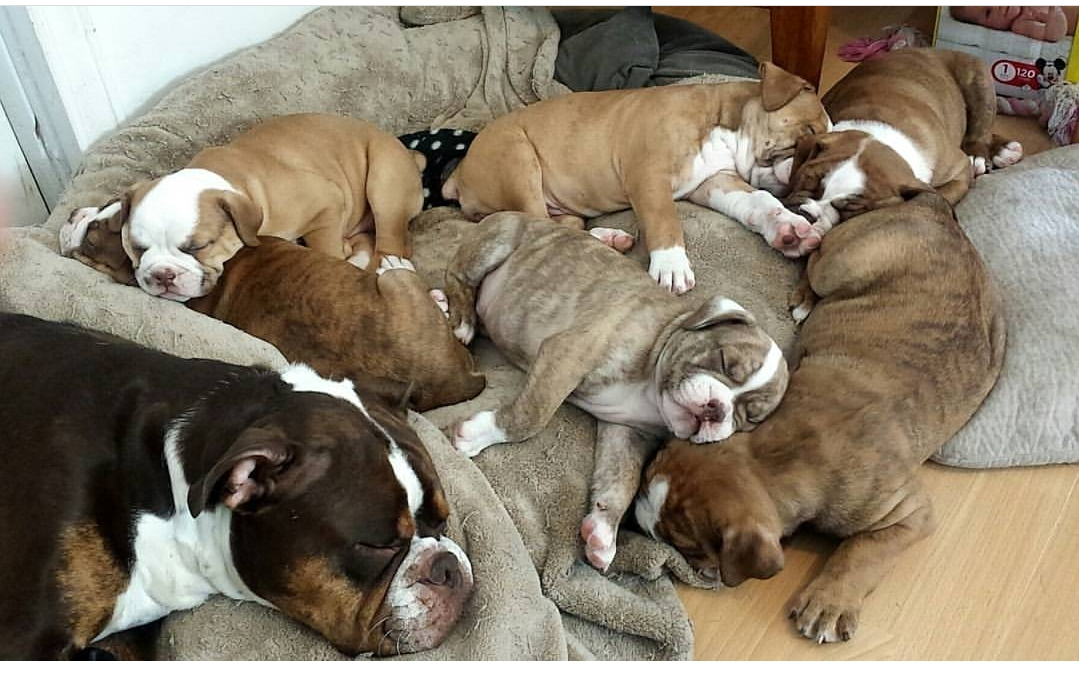
Olde English Bulldogges can have different coat colors

The skull is large and well-proportioned to the dog's muscular body and prominent shoulders. There is a defined furrow between the eyes (from the stop to the occiput). Narrow skull and domed forehead are faults. The muzzle is square, wide and deep. Bite is undershot or reverse scissors. Lower jawbone is moderately curved from front to back. Nostrils are wide, with a line running vertically between nostrils from the tip of nose down to the bottom of the upper lip. Nose is large and broad in relationship to the width of the muzzle. Nose color is black. Eyes are medium in size and almond shaped, dark to light brown, with black pigmented eye rims. They are set wide and low, level with the top of the muzzle. Ears are small, rose, button or tulip. Rose is preferred. They are set high, wide and to the back outer edge of the skull. The neck is medium length, wide, and slightly arched. The body is sturdy, powerful and slightly rectangular when viewed from the side. Chest is wide and deep. Hind legs are well muscled and have the appearance of being slightly longer than the forelegs. The hind legs should be straight, parallel and set apart. Accepted color patterns include brindle, and solid colors, with or without white. Males should be 60 to 80 pounds (27 to 36 kg), and 17 to 20 inches (43 to 51 cm) at the withers, while females should be 50 to 70 pounds (23 to 32 kg), and 16 to 19 inches (41 to 48 cm) at the withers.

== Health ==
The Olde English Bulldogge may be a healthier breed of dog than many modern bulldog breeds, though they can be affected by many of the same disorders that occur in any breed. Proponents of the breed maintain that it does not suffer from the same disorders as purebred Bulldogs. A 2016 study published in the journal Canine Genetics and Epidemiology examined genetic diversity among 102 registered Bulldogs. The Olde English Bulldogge was mentioned as an outcross candidate to introduce new genetics in an effort to correct some of the problems associated with inbreeding. In the European Union, rules have been written specifically for farm animals which state they have the rights of "freedom from discomfort" and "freedom from pain, injury and disease." A 2013 constitutional amendment in Switzerland restates the EU rules in greater detail, and extends such rights to all animals. Many Swiss dog breeders have begun outcrossing Bulldogs with the Olde English Bulldogge, having created the Continental Bulldog in an effort to bring the Bulldog into compliance.
