= Blue Lacy =

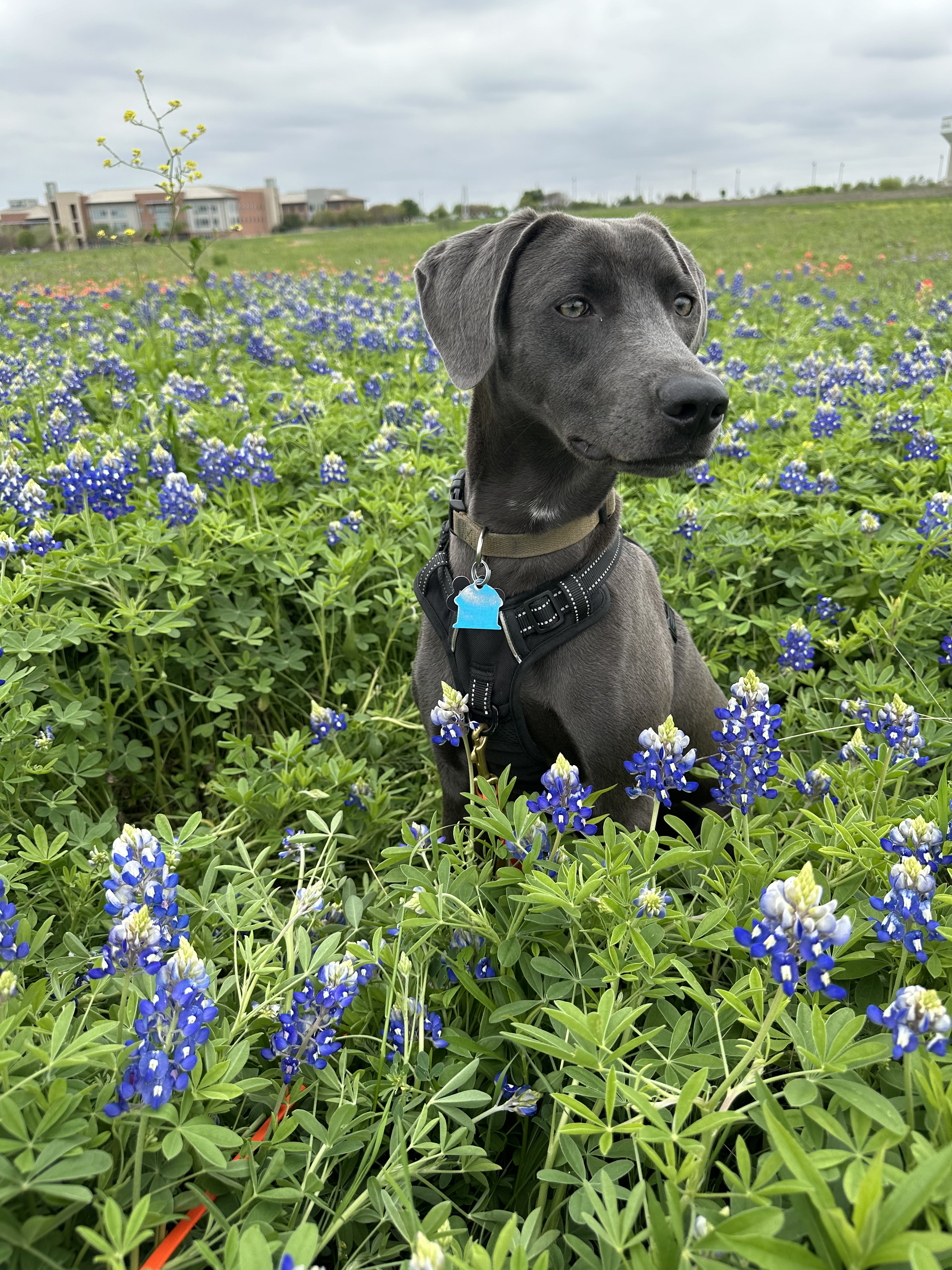
- Blue Lacy
- Other names: Lacy Dog; Lacy Game Dog; Texas Blue Lacy; Lacy Hog Dog; Lacy Cur
- Origin: United States
- Breed status: Not recognized as a breed by any major kennel club.
Traits
- Height: 46 to 53 cm (18 to 21 in)
Weight	Males	16 to 23 kg (35 to 50 lb)
	Females	11 to 20 kg (25 to 45 lb)
- Coat: smooth
- Color: blue, red, tricolored
- Notes: State dog of Texas

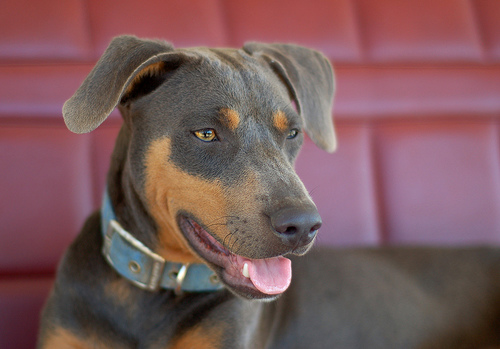
Blue and Tan Lacy

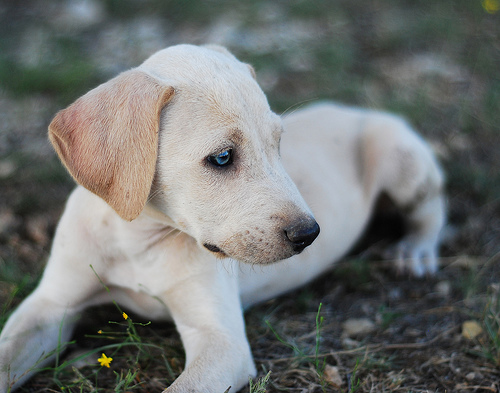
Red Lacy puppy

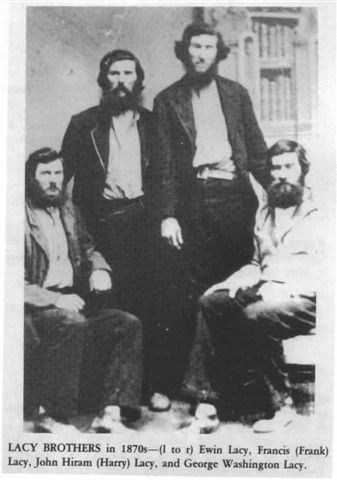
The Lacy Brothers in the 1870s (left to right) - Ewin Lacy, Francis Marion (Frank) Lacy, John Hiram (Harry) Lacy and George Washington Lacy, Jr.

The Lacy Dog or Blue Lacy Dog is a breed of working dog that originated in the U.S. state of Texas in the mid-19th century. The Lacy was first recognized in 2001 by the Texas Senate. In Senate Resolution No. 436, the 77th Legislature honored the Lacy as "a true Texas breed." In June 2005, Governor Rick Perry signed the legislation adopting the Blue Lacy as "the official State Dog Breed of Texas". As expected, the vast majority of Lacy dogs are found in Texas. However, as the breed becomes more recognized, breeding populations are being established across the United States, Canada, and most recently in Europe.

== Description ==
=== Appearance ===
Lacy dogs are strong and fast, lightly built but proportional within the height-to-weight ratio. Height at the withers is from 43 to 56 cm (17 to 22 in). Dependent on height and general conditioning, weight should be approximately 11 to 20 kg (25 to 45 lb) for females and 16 to 25 kg (35 to 55 lb) for males. The standards listed in the Texas House Concurrent Resolution No. 108 are slightly different—height between 46 and 64 cm (18 and 25 in) and weight between 14 and 23 kg (30 and 50 lb)—but it was not until 2005 that it was officially recognized as the state dog.

=== Color ===
Though they are often called "blue" Lacys, there are three permissible color varieties of the Lacy. "Blues" are any shade of gray from light silver to dark charcoal. "Reds" range from light cream to rust. The "Tri" combines a blue base with distinct red markings as appropriate for trim, and white which may appear on the brisket and stretch from chin to groin. White may also be present on one or more paws. Excessive white is discouraged, and markings on the face or above mid-line are a disqualifying fault. Their eyes are sharp and alert, ranging in color from bright yellow to rich amber.

=== Coat ===
The coat should be short, smooth and tight. An excessively long or rough coat is a disqualification. Lacys shed, but require minimal grooming.

=== Temperament ===
Blue Lacy Dogs are intelligent, intense, active, and alert. Developed to be both hunting and herding dogs, they display great drive and determination to work with big game and control difficult livestock. Young dogs may have too much energy and drive for small children. They are easy to train, learning new skills quickly.

== Activities ==
The Lacy is a working breed, and does much better when given a job, which allows them to burn off excessive energy. Work they excel at includes herding livestock, blood trailing or tracking, treeing game, running trap lines, and hunting wild hogs. Modern activities like agility that stress intelligence, passion, speed and nimbleness may be appropriate substitutes for traditional work. Herding instincts and trainability can be measured at noncompetitive herding tests. Lacys generally exhibit herding instincts and can be trained to compete in stock dog trials or hog bays. During recent years, Lacy dogs have also become recognized for their tracking skills, and are used to locate "lost" game animals. They are also used by United States trappers for save and chasing operations.

== Health ==
Lacys are generally healthy dogs. Developed for generations to meet the requirements of ranchers and hunters, they are sturdy enough to withstand tough terrain, difficult working conditions, and both hot and cold weather by Texan standards. However, skin problems and food allergies can occur. Color dilution alopecia is very rare but has occurred in Lacys.

== History ==
The Lacy dog was named after the Lacy brothers (Ewin, Frank, Harry, and George), ranchers from Kentucky that moved to Burnet County, Texas in 1858 and brought their ranching dogs with them. The lacy dog was said to be a mixture between greyhounds, scenthounds, and coyotes. They were bred to handle multiple tasks on the ranch such as herding cattle and free-roaming hog, tracking and treeing small game, and hunting deer and feral hogs. This led to the local nickname of the “lacy hog dog”. The Lacy family also donated pink granite from the ranch’s quarry on Granite Mountain to build the Texas State Capitol building in Austin, Texas, marking the family and their dogs as significant figures in Texas history.

On March 15, 2005, Representative Joaquin Castro filed House Concurrent Resolution No. 108, proposing the blue Lacy as the State Dog of Texas. This legislation was proposed to recognize the original breeders, the Lacy family, and their contribution to the State of Texas as well as to honor the Lacy Dog as a Texas original. House Concurrent Resolution No. 108 was adopted by the Texas House of Representatives on May 15, 2005, and by the Senate ten days later on May 25, 2005. Governor Rick Perry signed the legislation adopting the Lacy as "the official State Dog Breed of Texas" on June 18, 2005. At the time, the legislation claimed that the blue lacy was “the only dog breed to have originated in this state,” however the development of another Texas breed, the Silken Windhound, was well underway.

== See also ==
- List of dog breeds
