= Treeing Cur =

- Origin: United States
Traits
- Height: 18–24 inches (46–61 cm)
- Weight: 30–60 pounds (14–27 kg)
- Coat: Double coat with short- to medium-length, smooth or rough outer coat and short, soft, dense undercoat. Coat should be short and close.
- Color: Any color, color pattern, or combination of colors acceptable.
Kennel club standards
- United Kennel Club: standard

The Treeing Cur is a breed of dog that originated in the mid-west of the United States. It was first recognized by United Kennel Club on November 1, 1998. The treeing cur is used for hunting and guarding. They are primarily used to tree squirrels, raccoons, and other small game, as well as to hunt big game such as bears and mountain lions.

== Description ==
Treeing curs have no restrictions on color or markings like other registered coonhounds and scenthounds this allows breeders to breed for ability and not be restricted by color standards. There is also no proven link between color or markings to hunting or working ability.

=== Appearance ===
Treeing curs are medium-sized dogs known for their speed and agility in rough terrain. Their build is athletic and without major conformational faults. Their build and size can range greatly, because of the nature of the registration requirements of the treeing cur according to United Kennel Club "Most Cur breeders were not well off and so they required a dog that could serve multiple purposes: hunter, guardian, and stock dog. The result was the Treeing Cur, which is the most varied in size and colors of the Cur breeds." They are known for having a tail that is occasionally naturally bobbed but mostly artificially docked, Long tails are also acceptable. The ears should be natural and floppy, not erect. The dog should have a smooth athletic gait. The coat should be dense and close, and all colors except albinos are acceptable. The dog is built for stamina and should look like a working dog. In the United Kennel Club standard, scars are not penalized, nor used as a mark of a dog's working ability.

== Use ==
The treeing cur is a hunting breed. It is noted for its excellent sense of smell, often detecting prey when other breeds cannot. They can be used to hunt squirrels, raccoons, bears, and even mountain lions. The treeing cur is typically silent when tracking a squirrel, but very vocal when tracking a raccoon.

The treeing cur can be a family pet. However, they bond very closely to their humans, and thus it is advised not to keep other dogs with one.

== History ==
The term "treeing cur" was once applied to any dog, regardless of origin, that specialized in treeing. In 1993, the National Treeing Cur Association was created, after it was determined that the breed was distinct. The breed was recognized by the United Kennel Club on 1 November 1998. Prior to this recognition, treeing curs were called "grade dogs" when competing in hunting competitions.

A notable early treeing cur is Limbgripper Ranger, a four-time world champion squirrel dog, who was inducted into the National Treeing Cur Association Hall of Fame.

== See also ==
- List of dog breeds
