= Australian National Kennel Council =

Purebred dog registry

- Abbreviation: ANKC
- Formation: 1958
- Type: Kennel club
- Legal status: Active
- Headquarters: Melton, Victoria
- Region served: Australia
- Members: 60,000
- Official language: English
- Parent organization: Dogs Australia
- Website: dogsaustralia.org.au

Australian National Kennel Council Ltd, currently trading as Dogs Australia, is a not-for-profit registry for purebred dogs in Australia. It serves as the coordinating kennel club for the country and as the head administrative body to which each state's individual canine association defers. The ANKC is an associate member of the Fédération Cynologique Internationale and, as of 2025, recognises 238 breeds.

== History ==
The first meeting to consider forming the Australian National Kennel Council was held on the 14th of April, 1949 at the Sydney Royal Easter Show. It was not until the 7th of April 1958 that the draft constitution was put to delegates from other Australian states and territories. It was agreed upon at this meeting that the "Australian Kennel Club" be formed.

It was on the 25th of September, 1958 that the name of the "Australian Kennel Club" was altered, forming the “Australian National Kennel Council”. This was a notable meeting for the ANKC, as it introduced both the National Stud Register, as well as the resolution "That the Australian National Kennel Council be constituted so that it is empowered to act only as a coordinating and recommendatory body" reflecting the attitudes of the member bodies that the ANKC remain an advisory body rather than an authoritative body. The council was officially formed, and constitution approved, at this meeting.

=== Constitutional developments ===
Since the formation of the ANKC in 1958, it has undergone two major constitutional rewritings.

- 1981-1982 (advisory to coordinating body): On the 23rd of September, 1981 a subcommittee was appointed to draft a new constitution for the ANKC, with the goal of turning the ANKC into a "coordinating body". This constitution was passed on one year later on the 22nd of September, 1982 and allowed the council to take on additional roles and make decisions the prior constitution would not have accepted.
- 2010-2011 (incorporation and legal entity): The ANKC made the decision in the 2000s that it was to become a legal entity, with yet another new constitution to be accepted on the 17th of October, 2010 with an implementation date of the 12th of February, 2011. This new constitution incorporated the council as the "AUSTRALIAN NATIONAL KENNEL COUNCIL LIMITED" under the Corporations Act 2001 (C'th) with documents being lodged on the 1st of July, 2011 to the Australian Securities and Investment Commission (ASIC), officially recognising the council as a legal entity.

== Function ==
The goal of the Australian National Kennel Council is to act as a peak body for Australia's state-and-territory-based canine associations, it also trades under the consumer-facing Dogs Australia, in which it advocates for ethical breeding practices and responsible breed stewardship. The ANKC also acts as a spokesperson on canine-related issues and activities nationally, as well as in support of respective bodies.

=== ANKC member bodies ===
The ANKC has 8 member bodies, each belonging to their respective state or territory. These member bodies are:

- Australian Capital Territory Canine Association Inc (Dogs ACT)
- Canine Association of Western Australia Inc (Dogs West)
- Canine Control Council (Queensland) (Dogs Qld)
- North Australian Canine Association Inc (Dogs NT)
- Royal New South Wales Canine Council Ltd (Dogs NSW)
- South Australia Canine Association Inc (Dogs SA)
- Tasmanian Canine Association Inc (Dogs Tas)
- Victorian Canine Association Inc (Dogs Vic)

It also maintains stud books for recognised dog breeds, and provides governance for dog shows, dog trials and canine events and is the international representative of the kennel clubs of Australia.

== Breeds ==
The ANKC recognises 238 breeds, as of 2025. These breeds are split into seven groups, these are:

ANKC groups
Group	Type	Example
1	Toy	
2	Terrier	
3	Gundog	
4	Hound	
5	Working Dog	
6	Utility	
7	Non-sporting	

The ANKC, as an associate member of the Fédération Cynologique Internationale, is bound to recognise all FCI-recognised breeds and FCI-recognised nomenclature at international CACIB events. Though, this obligation does not apply to ANKC's own shows, where the organisation uses its own nomenclature (pictured in the table above) and observes its own recognised breeds.

== Activities ==
The ANKC is primarily known for its role in the sport of conformation in Australia. Despite this the ANKC also hosts numerous dog-sporting events, such as:

List of ANKC activities and sports
Activity	Example
Agility	
Dances with Dogs	
Draft Test	
Earthdog	
Endurance	
Field Trials	
Herding	
Lure Coursing	
Obedience	
Rally Obedience	
Retrieving for Gundogs	
Scentwork	
Track and Search	
Tracking	
Trick Dog	
Utility Gundog Ability Tests	

== Recognised associations and kindred bodies ==
The ANKC recognises several other working dog associations and kindred bodies, nationally and internationally. These recognised clubs are outlined in Regulations, part 6 and include:

- American Herding Breeds Association
- American Kennel Club
- Australian Sheepdog Workers' Association
- Australian Shepherd Club of America, Inc
- Australian Working Border Collie
- Canadian Kennel Club
- FCI Affiliates Members
- Koolie Club of Australia
- Murray River Retriever Association Incorporated
- New South Wales Yard Dog Association Inc.
- New Zealand Sheep Dog Trial Association (Inc)
- NSW Sheepdog Workers Inc
- Queensland Cattle Dog Trial Association
- Queensland Working Sheep Dog Association
- SEQ Paddock Workers Association
- South Australian Working Sheepdog Association Incorporated
- Tasmanian Working Sheepdog Association Inc
- The International Sheep Dog Society (ISDS)
- The Kennel Club (UK)
- The North American Sheep Dog Society (NASDS)
- The West Australian Working Sheep Dog Association
- The White Swiss Shepherd Dog Club of Australia Inc
- The Working Kelpie Council of Australia Inc.
- United States Border Collie Handler's Association
- Working Koolie Association of Australia Inc.

== ORCHID database ==
ORCHID (Officially Registered Canine Health Information Database) is a health information database maintained by the ANKC for purebred dogs in Australia as part of their strategy for maintaining the health and integrity of recognised breeds.. The database is designed to record health test results (hips, elbows, eyes, spines, respiratory function) and generate breed-specific statistics. The database allows vet-entered results and owner-entered data, with options for results to be marked public or private.

Unlike services such as OFA or PennHIP, the ORCHID database is open only to purebred dogs recognised within the ANKC, similar to the CHIC system for AKC-recognised dogs in the United States.

== See also ==
- List of dog breeds
- List of kennel clubs
- List of working dog associations
- Fédération Cynologique Internationale
