= Yakee A Dangerous Liaison =

Pekingese, who was the winner of the title of Best in Show at the Crufts in 2003

Ch. Yakee A Dangerous Liaison
- Other name: Danny
- Species: Canis lupus familiaris
- Breed: Pekingese
- Sex: Male
- Born: 6 September 1999
- Occupation: Show dog
- Title: Best in Show at Cruft's
- Term: 2003–2004
- Predecessor: NORD Ch. Topscore Contradiction (Poodle (Standard))
- Successor: Ch. Cobyco Call the Tune (Whippet)
- Owners: Bert Easdon and Philip Martin

Ch. Yakee A Dangerous Liaison (born 6 September 1999), also known as Danny, was a Pekingese, who was the winner of the title of Best in Show at the Crufts in 2003. He had previously been Reserve Best in Show at the competition in 2002. Following his victory, he was accused of having undergone a cosmetic procedure, which supposedly turned out to be an exploratory surgery for tonsillitis. A documentary broadcast in 2008, "Pedigree Dogs Exposed" later revealed that Danny had in fact undergone surgery due to a serious inherited disorder, exacerbated by conformation to breed standards.

== Show career ==
Danny began his conformation show career at the age of three months, winning nine Best in Show titles prior to Crufts in 2003. In 2002, he won a Golden Bone Award for his work as a show dog.

In 2003, he was named Best in Show at Crufts, with the Kerry Blue Terrier, Torums Tunde Bayou, named Reserve Best in Show. Torum Runde Bayou was the younger brother of previous Crufts champion Torums Scarf Michael, who had won Best in Show at the Westminster Kennel Club Dog Show earlier in the year. The other finalists were Penling By Design at Namkia (a standard Poodle), Mistweave Making Waves (Greyhound), And I'm Great To Be Back (Newfoundland), Hamble Huckleberry (Bearded Collie) and Inkwells Named Shadow (Flat Coated Retriever). Danny had won the Toy Group twice in previous years, and in 2002 was Reserve Best in Show at Crufts, being beaten by Nord Ch. Topscore Contradiction. The 2003 Crufts competition was Danny's last, as he was retired from conformation showing following his win.

During the awards ceremony, Danny needed to be cooled down with an ice pack in order to prevent him from overheating. This point was later used in the BBC One documentary special Pedigree Dogs Exposed to highlight issues with the breed. Following the win, an anonymous informant informed the Kennel Club that Danny had previously undergone cosmetic surgery (banned under conformation show rules). An investigation was conducted and the information turned out to be incorrect, with the operation claimed to have been an exploratory surgery due to persistent tonsillitis. A letter to the Kennel Club from the University of Glasgow indicated that the surgery was for a resection of the soft palate and laryngeal saccules to relieve an upper airway obstruction. Pedigree Dogs Exposed reported on the cosmetic surgery allegations but stated that the operation was legitimate medical surgery. Ofcom later found against the television show for not allowing the Kennel Club a chance to respond to the implied cover-up of the operation on air.

Although Danny did not participate in the breed competitions at Crufts after his Best in Show victory in 2003, the Yakee kennel continued to be successful in subsequent years, winning Best of Breed for the Pekingese in 2004 and 2005. One of Danny's sons, Yakee If Only, became the number one ranked dog in America in 2005 having won 64 Best in Show titles and the Toy Group on 128 occasions in a variety of shows.

== See also ==
- List of individual dogs
