= Afterglow Miami Ink =

Crufts-winning American Cocker Spaniel

Afterglow Miami Ink (born June 15, 2015) received Crufts Best in Show title by Judge Jeff Horswell on March 12, 2017. The American Cocker Spaniel is handled and co-owned by Blackpool resident Jason Lynn and Rui Jorge Da Silva. He was bred by Michael Gadsby and Jason Lynn, who were the first to have ever bred two Crufts Best In Show winners (the other one being Ch/Am Ch Afterglow Maverick Sabre in the 2014 Best In Show competition). The dog does not have the typical gundog characteristics and as such his unconventional breeding “software” was criticized. Over 22,000 dogs – from 56 countries – competed in the four-day event which was held at the Birmingham NEC arena and was attended by around 160,000 dog lovers/owners. Other wins Afterglow Miami Ink has include: 8 March 1 place at Crufts in Group and Best in Show and 4th place (in breed and group) at the World Dog Show in Germany. In 2018 he retired and fathered four puppies.
