= Mixed Breed Dog Clubs of America =

- Abbreviation: MBDCA
- Established: 1978
- Location: United States
- Website: mbdca.tripod.com

The Mixed Breed Dog Clubs of America (MBDCA) is a registry for mixed-breed dogs in the United States.

== Overview ==
The Mixed Breed Dog Clubs of America was founded in 1978 and began holding shows in the same year. The Mixed Breed Dog Clubs of America conducts a number of competitions, including conformation shows, obedience trials, lure coursing, tracking and other events. The club's conformation shows are judged against general soundness of type and temperament as opposed to a breed standard and prior to competing in any competitions a dog must be spayed or neutered and have successfully completed the club's obedience trials.

== See also ==
- American Sighthound Field Association
