= Kerry Bog Pony =

Breed of horse

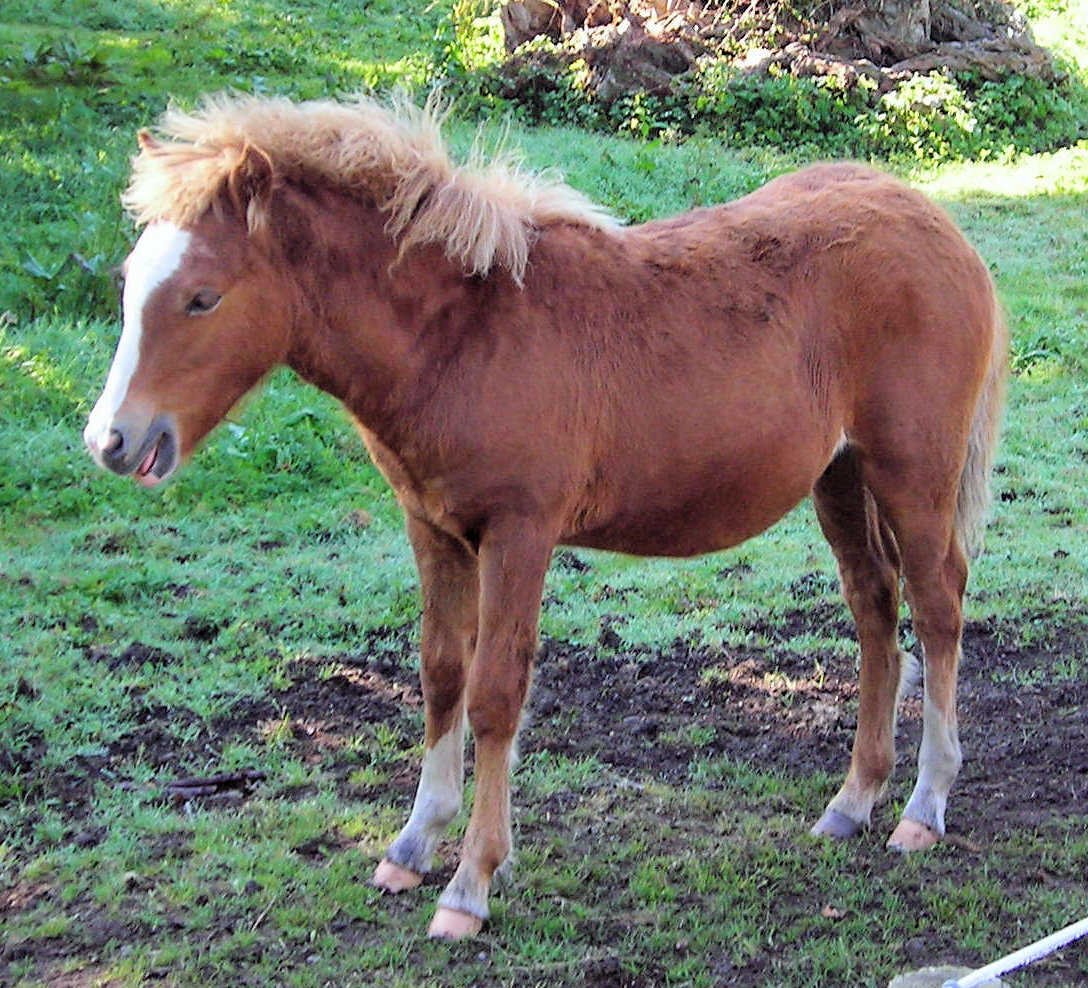
- Young Kerry Bog Pony
- Country of origin: Ireland

Traits
- Distinguishing features: Small pony, uniquely adapted to boggy ground

Breed standards
- Kerry Bog Pony Co-Operative Society of Ireland

The Kerry Bog Pony is a mountain and moorland breed of pony that originated in Ireland. Possibly descended from the Irish Hobby horse, it originally lived a mainly feral existence in the peat bogs of what is now County Kerry in southwestern Ireland. Local inhabitants used the ponies as pack and cart horses for transporting peat and kelp to the villages. The breed developed physical characteristics including a low weight-to-height ratio and an unusual footfall pattern, which helped it move on soft ground such as peat bogs. The ponies were known for hardiness and an ability to survive in harsh conditions.

War, increasing mechanisation and declines in the local small-farm population almost resulted in the breed's extinction. In 1994, a local man found and genetically tested a herd of 20 ponies he used as the foundation stock for rebuilding of the breed. In the early 2000s, the breed was recognised by the Irish Department of Agriculture and Food and the European Commission; equine passports began to be issued for members of the breed, and small numbers of ponies were exported to the United States. At the same time, Irish and American breed registries were formed. As of 2011, the registered population is more than 300 ponies.

== Characteristics ==
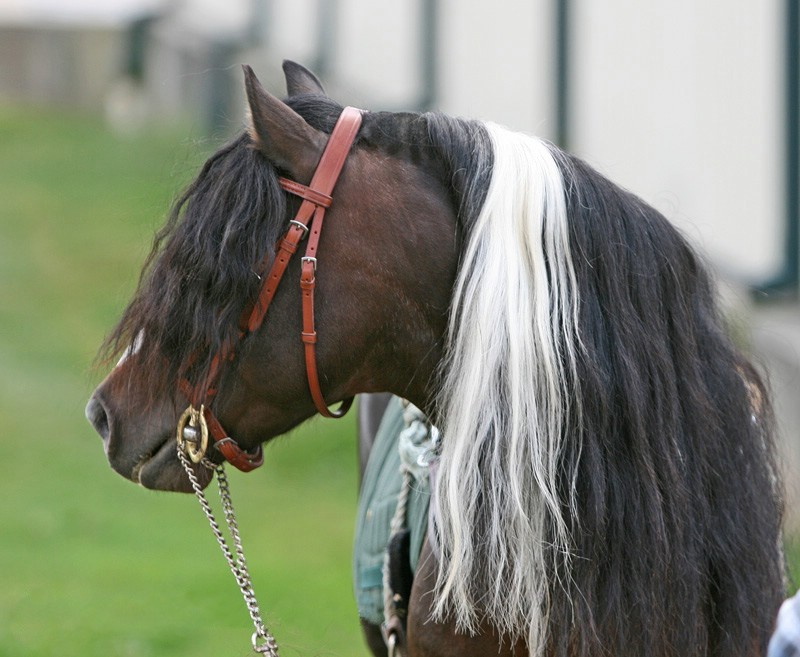
The head and thick mane and forelock of a Kerry Bog Pony

Kerry Bog Ponies generally stand 10 to 12 hands (40 to 48 inches, 102 to 122 cm) high. The Irish breed standard calls for mares to stand 10–11 hands and stallions and geldings to stand 11–12 hands. Their low weight-to-height ratio enables them to walk on wet ground. Their hind feet tend to track outside their front feet, allowing better progress on soft ground. They exhibit a relatively upright pastern and steep hoof angle compared to other breeds, possibly another characteristic that aids their movement in peat bogs. Kerry Bog Ponies are easy keepers, and when feral they lived on low-nutrient heather, sphagnum moss and possibly kelp from the shoreline. Overall, they are muscular and strong and their heads have concave profiles, small ears and large eyes. Their winter coat is long and dense, serving as protection from harsh weather. All solid coat colours are found, including dilute colours such as palomino, and white markings are common. Pinto-coloured animals are not accepted by the Irish registry. The breed is known by enthusiasts for strength, intelligence and athleticism, and generally used for driving, as companion animals and for therapeutic riding programs.

Kerry Bog Ponies were historically known in Ireland as "hobbies", possibly derived from the Gaelic practice of obaireacht, or the calling out of "Hup, Hup" to attract a pony back to the farmyard. It is considered one of the mountain and moorland pony breeds from Britain and Ireland. A 2006 study using mitochondrial DNA found that the Kerry Bog Pony is not closely related to the other two native Irish breeds, the Irish Draught and the Connemara pony. It has a rare haplogroup more closely related to other small horse breeds found in western Europe, including the Shetland pony and Icelandic horse. A 2012 study found relationships between the Kerry Bog Pony and the Dartmoor Pony and Exmoor Pony breeds, and a lack of common ancestry with the Welsh Pony, as well as reinforcing the lack of relationship to the Connemara. The study also suggested that the Kerry Bog Pony population had some amount of crossbreeding with other mountain and moorland breeds as part of the initial attempts to increase the population in the 1990s. The Kerry Bog Pony may have been one of several breeds that contributed to the development of the Gypsy Vanner horse (also known as the Irish Cob).

== Breed history ==
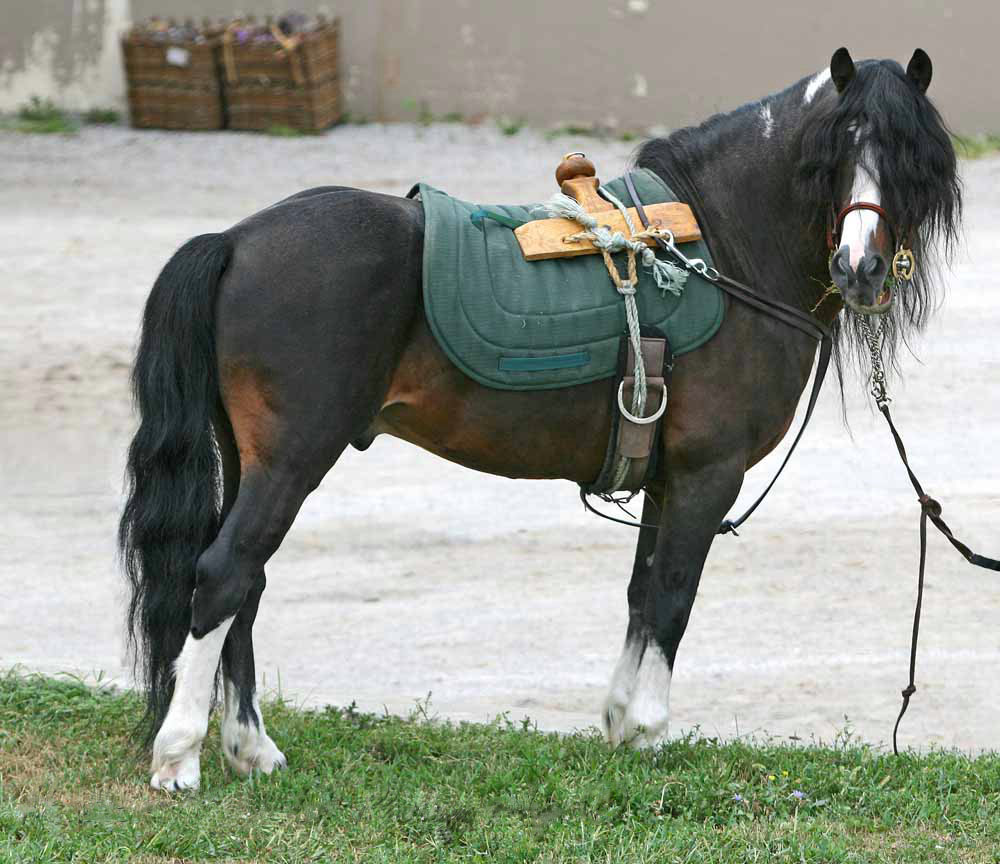
A stallion with pack saddle

The original ancestry of the Kerry Bog Pony is unknown, but there were horses living a feral existence in peat bogs in what is now County Kerry in southwestern Ireland since at least the 1600s. Some enthusiasts claim that the breed is a descendant of the ancient Irish Hobby. In a 1617 book illustration, the horses pictured resemble both the Kerry Bog Pony of today and the original Irish Hobby, showing the two breeds' similar morphology. Originally, Kerry Bog Ponies were used to transport peat and kelp. They were known for their ability to navigate through the bogs, around soft spots and over rocks often in wet and windy weather, and for their strength relative to their small size. Some were trained to work in harness and used to pull carts. The ponies were turned loose into the peat bogs when they were not needed, then later re-caught for work. Few if any breeding programs existed; instead, they were left to reproduce in their feral setting. In 1720, Isaac Ware travelled to County Kerry and observed that the horses resembled Asturcón ponies from Spain.

The British cavalry became aware of the ponies in 1804, during the Peninsular War, and used them as pack animals during the conflict; most did not return to Ireland. The famine of 1845–1852 furthered their decline, as farmers who previously utilised them died or emigrated. In addition, Spanish donkeys were brought to the island to replace the ponies, and when peat declined as a fuel source, pack animals were no longer needed. In the 1850s, farms began to be consolidated, and more machinery and large draft horses were employed, further reducing the number of ponies needed. Consequently, the ponies were left to run feral, mostly ignored and sometimes shot at by locals.

=== Re-emergence ===
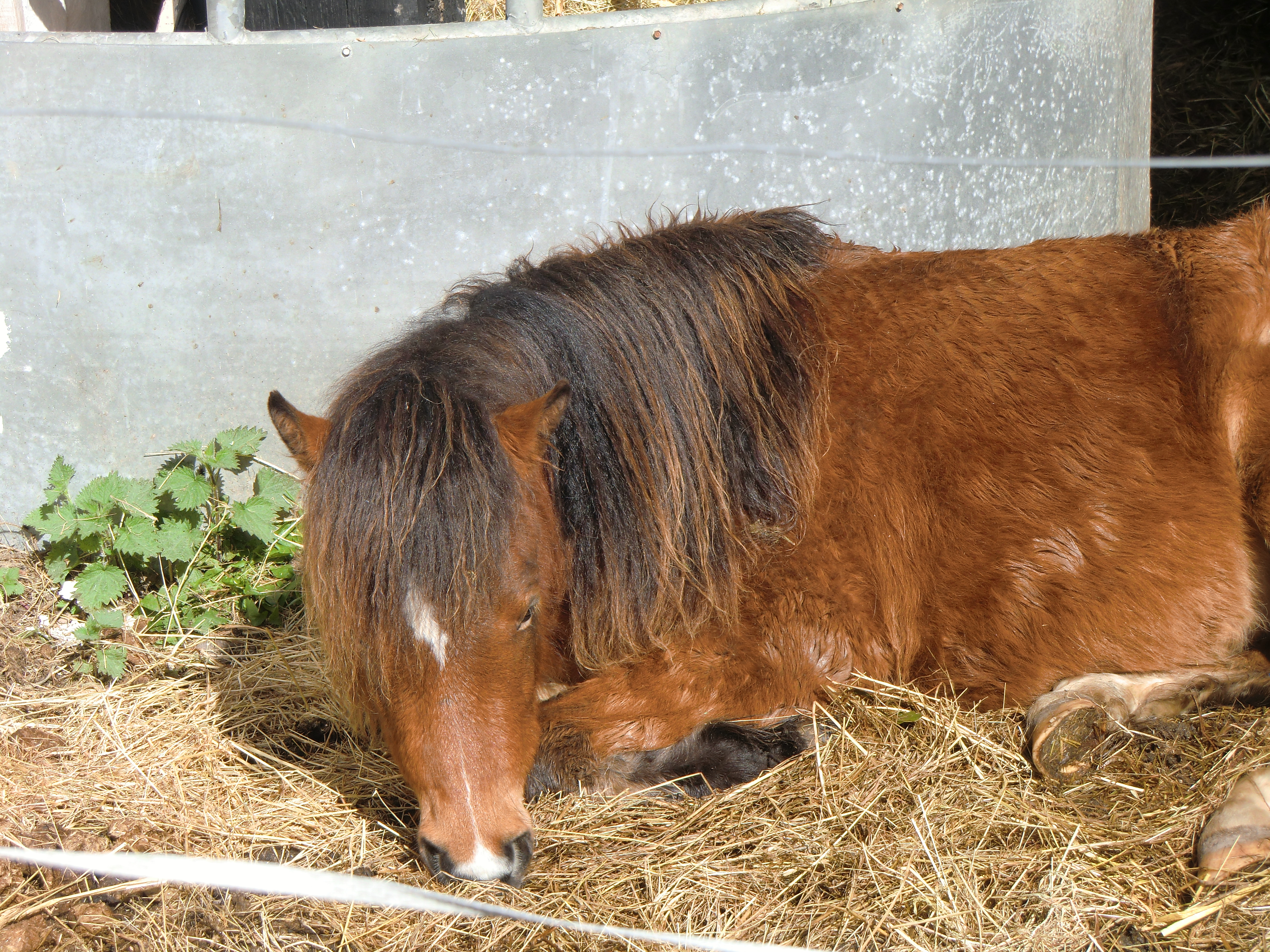
A pony at the Kerry Bog Village Museum

In 1994, John Mulvihill, who operated the Red Fox Inn at the Kerry Bog Village in Glenbeigh, County Kerry, began a search for remnants of the Kerry Bog Pony population, despite reports that the breed was extinct. He eventually found 20 ponies that resembled those he remembered from his childhood, and removed them from the bog to his stables. In 1995, he had blood typing performed on the ponies by Weatherby's Ireland, which identified their DNA markers. Subsequent DNA testing showed them to be a unique breed that formed a separate population from other local ponies and from other breeds in Ireland and Great Britain. Of these 20 ponies, only one was a stallion, named Flashy Fox. Between 1995 and 2012, he sired more than 140 foals, and played a significant role in repopulating the breed.

Mulvihill continued breeding and promoting the ponies, and in 2002, the breed was recognised by the Irish Government as the Irish Heritage Pony. The same year, the Kerry Bog Pony Society was formed. Also in 2002, Americans became interested in the breed, and the first ponies were exported from Ireland to the US in 2003, to a farm in Ohio. In 2005, the American Kerry Bog Pony Society was founded, with 11 initial registrants. Also in 2005, the Irish Department of Agriculture and Food and the European Commission recognised the Kerry Bog Pony as an official breed; the following year, the Irish Horse Board issued the first equine passports for members of the breed. Until 2009, there was an exception in place that allowed unrelated ponies that met the physical breed standards to be bred as Kerry Bog Ponies, with the offspring being registered and given passports certifying them as purebred Kerry Bog Ponies. This was in part due to a concern of inbreeding among the small number of ponies initially registered. Kerry Bog Ponies were also part of the Irish Rural Environment Protection Scheme (closed to new applicants in 2009), which financially rewarded farmers for using environmentally-friendly methods. The Kerry Bog Village, an open-air museum on the Ring of Kerry is one location that breeds and houses part of the existing Kerry Bog Pony population.

As of 2011, there were 335 mares and 51 stallions registered with the Irish registry, which included 59 new foals that year. Herd numbers have steadily increased since registrations began in 2005. These numbers make the Kerry Bog Pony third in population numbers among Irish breeds, behind the Connemara pony and the Irish Draught. Despite the increasing numbers, the breed is still considered to be critically endangered by the Equus Survival Trust. The horses are administered by the Kerry Bog Pony Co-Operative Society of Ireland (formerly the Kerry Bog Pony Society), which is based in Ireland with a branch in Great Britain. Inspections are required before ponies are allowed into the studbook. The book is divided into four classes: Class 1 ponies meet all requirements, Class 2 ponies do not meet the height requirement, Class 3 ponies do not meet the color requirements, and Class 4 ponies have yet to submit to an official inspection. The breed association has hosted an annual breed show and sale in Glenbeigh, County Kerry since 2007.

The first two ponies exported from Ireland went to a farm in Austria in August 2016. The International Kerry Bog Pony Association was formed around the same time in 2016 by a group of breeders from a small group of countries to create a registry to accommodate pony owners spanning multiple countries.
