= Afghan Hound =

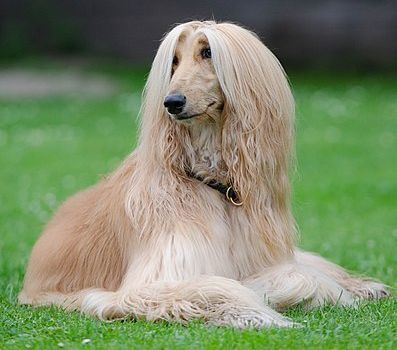
- Afghan Hound in light cream coat
- Other names: Tazi
- Origin: Afghanistan
Traits
- Height: 61–73 cm (24–29 in)
- Weight: 20–27 kg (44–60 lb)
- Coat: Long and fine
- Colour: Fawn; Gold; Brindle; White; Red; Cream; Blue; Gray; Tricolour
- Litter size: 6–8 puppies
Kennel club standards
- Fédération Cynologique Internationale: standard

The Afghan Hound (Pashto: تاژي سپی Tāžī Spay Dari: سگ تازی Sag-e Tāzī ) is a hound distinguished by its thick, fine, silky coat, and a tail with a ring curl at the end. The breed originates in the cold mountains of Afghanistan where it has been bred for speed and game hunting. Other names for this breed are Tāzī, Thasi, Barakzai Hound, and Balochi Hound.

The American Kennel Club (AKC) describes the breed as among the most eye-catching of all. The Afghan Hound is an "aloof and dignified aristocrat of sublime beauty." Despite their regal appearance, the Afghan possesses an "endearing streak of silliness and a profound loyalty."

Admired since ancient times for their beauty, the Afghan Hound's distinctive coat was developed as protection from the harsh mountain climate. Their huge paw-pads served as shock absorbers on the rocky terrain.

== History ==
The Afghan Hound has been identified as a basal breed that predates the emergence of the modern breeds in the 19th century. It is most closely related to the Saluki.

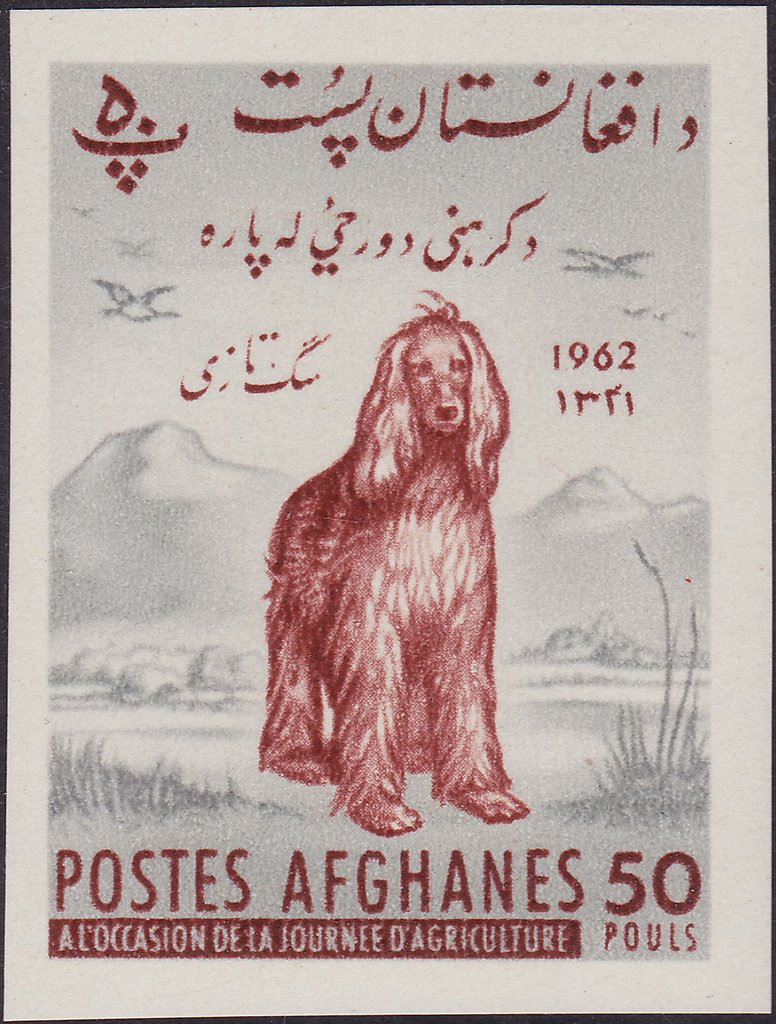
The Afghan Hound depicted on a postage stamp from Afghanistan (1962)

Connections with other types and breeds from the same area may provide clues to the history. A name for a desert coursing Afghan Hound, Tazi, suggests a shared ancestry with the very similar Tazy breed from the Caspian Sea area of Russia and Turkmenistan. Other types or breeds of similar appearance are the Taigan from the mountainous Tian Shan region on the Chinese border of Afghanistan, and the Barakzay, or Kurram Valley Hound.

Once out of Afghanistan, the history of the Afghan Hound breed became entwined with that of the very earliest dog shows and the Kennel Club (UK). Various sighthounds were brought to England in the 1800s by army officers returning from British India and were exhibited at dog shows, which were then just becoming popular, under various names, such as Barukzy hounds. They were also called "Persian Greyhounds" by the English, in reference to their own indigenous sighthound.

One dog in particular, Zardin, was brought in 1907 from India by Captain John Barff. Zardin became the early ideal for the breed type still referred to as the Persian Greyhound. Zardin was the basis of the writing for the first breed standard in 1912, but this breeding cycle was stopped by World War I.

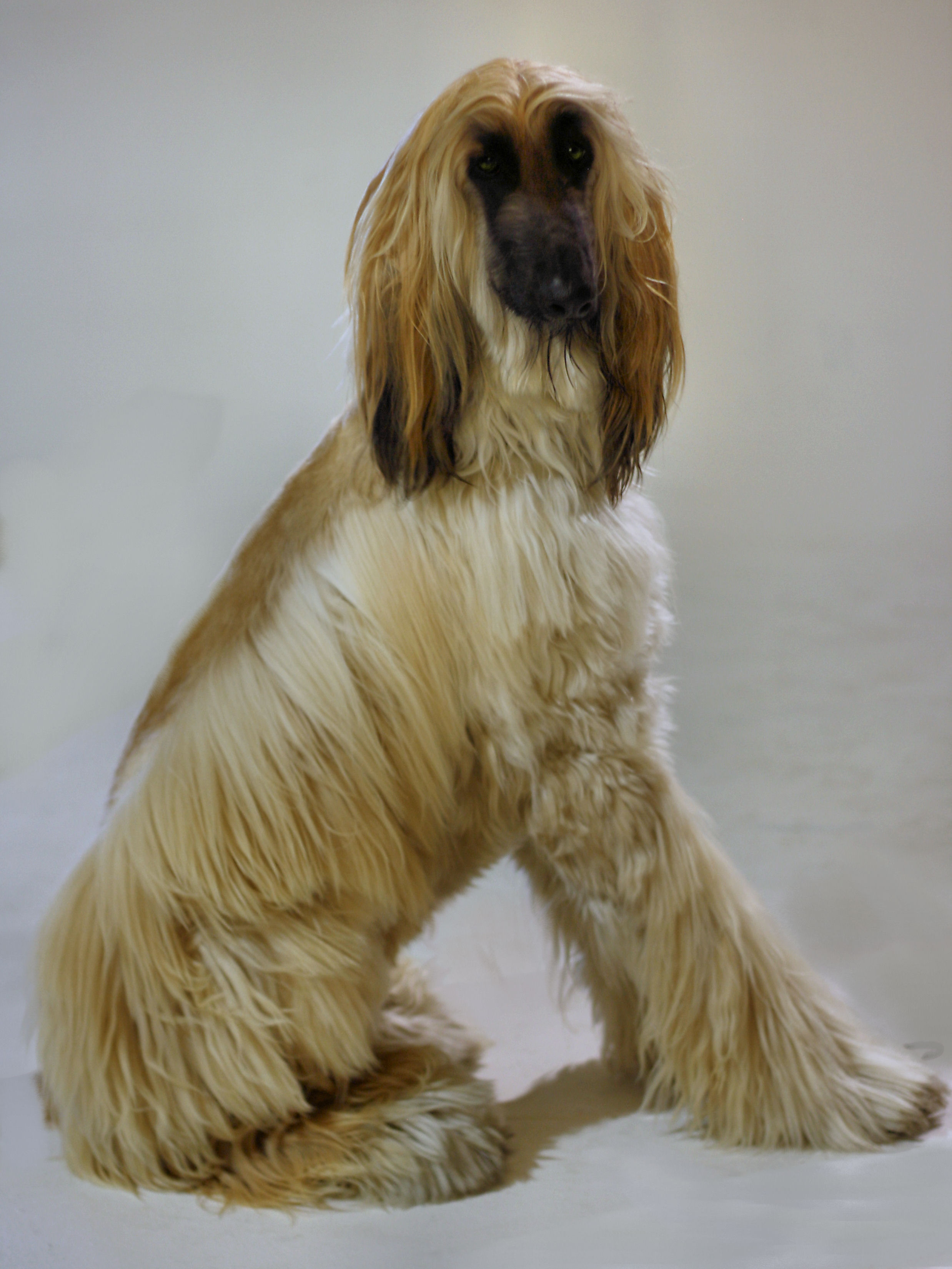
Young dog. Many individuals have a black facial mask.

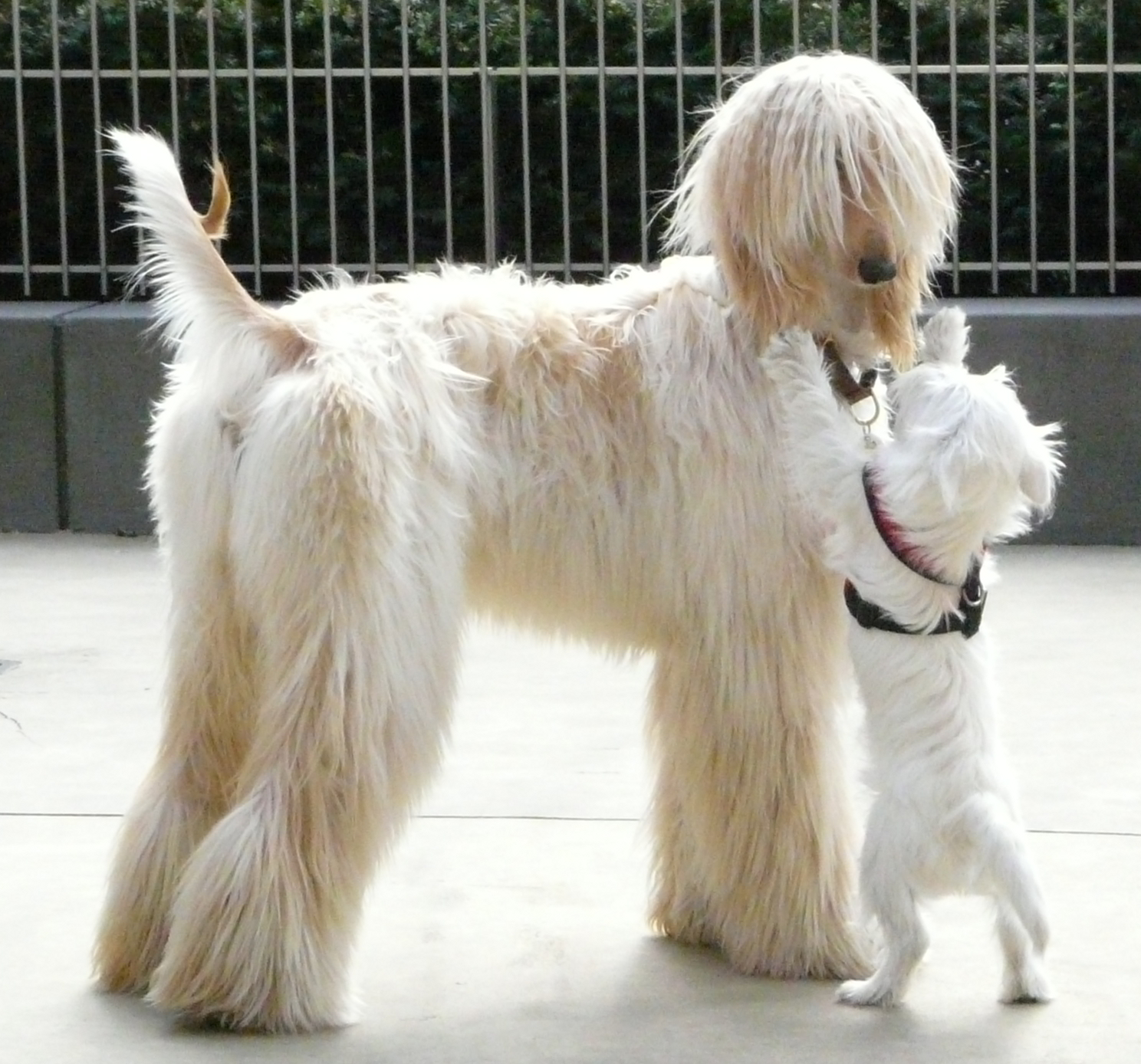
Light cream coated Afghan Hound

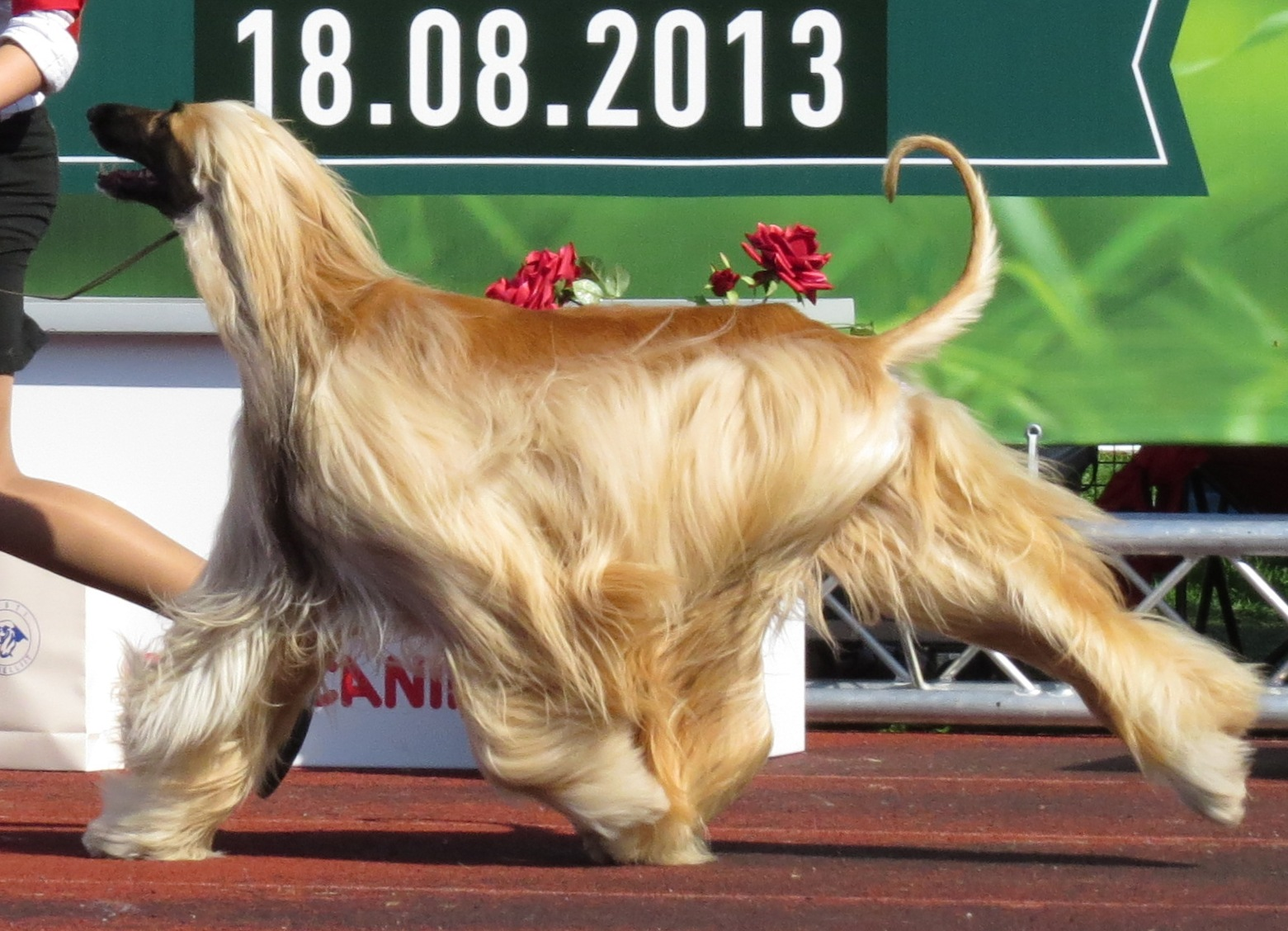
Afghan Hound in the ring

Out of the longhaired sighthound types known in Afghanistan, two main strains make up the modern Afghan Hound breed. The first were a group of hounds brought to Scotland from Balochistan by Major and Mrs. G. Bell-Murray and Miss Jean C. Manson in 1920, and they are known as the Bell-Murray strain. These dogs were of the "steppe" or “desert” type and were less heavily coated.

The second strain was a group of dogs from a kennel in Kabul owned by Mrs. Mary Amps, which she shipped to England in 1925. She and her husband came to Kabul after the Afghan war in 1919, and the foundation sire of her kennel (named Ghazni) in Kabul was a dog that closely resembled Zardin. Her Ghazni strain were the more heavily coated mountain type. Most of the Afghans in the United States were developed from the Ghazni strain from England. The first Afghans in Australia were imported from the United States in 1934, also of the Ghazni strain. The mountain and steppe strains became mixed into the modern Afghan Hound breed, and a new standard was written in 1948, which is still used today.

The Afghan Hound can also come with a much more "patterned" coat. This descends from the Bell-Murray's and the Ghazni lines, and is displayed in much lighter feathering of coat, deeper saddle (often actually looking like a saddle) and much shorter hair on the face and neck. It is believed that these particular Afghan Hounds were a product of much hotter parts of the country.

The beauty of Afghan Hound dogs caused them to become highly desirable show dogs and pets, and they are recognised by all of the major kennel clubs in the English-speaking world. One of the Amps Ghazni, Sirdar, won best in show at Crufts in 1928 and 1930. An Afghan Hound was featured on the cover of Life Magazine on November 26, 1945. Afghan Hounds were the most popular in Australia in the 1970s, and won most of the major shows. An Afghan Hound won Best in Show (BIS) at the 1996 World Dog Show in Budapest. Afghan Hounds were BIS at the Westminster Kennel Club Dog Show in 1957 and again in 1983.

The Afghan Hound breed is no longer used for hunting, although it can be seen in the sport of lure coursing.

On August 3, 2005, Korean scientist Hwang Woo-Suk announced that his team of researchers had become the first team to successfully clone a dog, an Afghan Hound named Snuppy. In 2006 Hwang Woo-Suk was dismissed from his university position for fabricating data in his research. Snuppy, nonetheless, was a genuine clone, and thus the first cloned dog in history.

Zaida, an Afghan Hound, was awarded 1st in the Hound category for the 150th Westminster Kennel Club event.

== Description ==
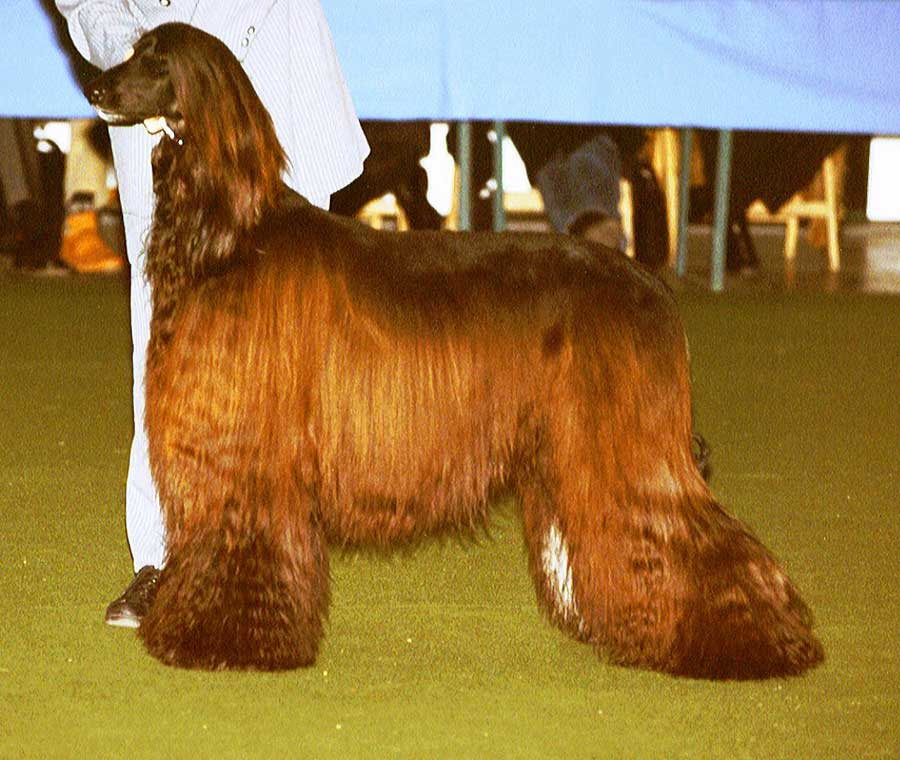
This Afghan Hound is black and brindle; however, the photo shows it with a reddish tinge to the coat, which can occur in a black-coated dog.

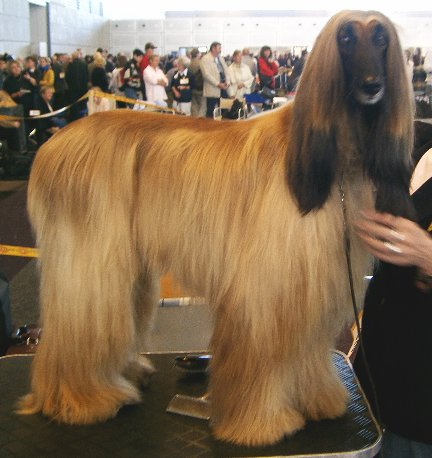
A fully coated Afghan Hound

The dogs in this breed occur in many different coat colors. A study that mapped the genes of Afghan Hounds and discussed the effect of genes on coat colour in the breed was published in the Journal of Heredity in 2010.

The Afghan Hound is tall, standing in height 61–74 cm (24–29 in) and weighing 20–27 kg (44–60 lb). The coat may be any colour, but white markings, particularly on the head, are discouraged; many individuals have a black facial mask. A specimen may have a beard on the lower jaw, known as a "mandarin". Some Afghan Hounds are almost white, but parti-color hounds (white with islands of red or black) are penalized in the AKC standard, but not by the FCI.

Their long, fine-textured coat requires considerable care and grooming. The long topknot and the shorter-haired saddle on the back of the dog are distinctive features of the Afghan Hound coat. The high hipbones and unique small ring on the end of the tail are also characteristics of the breed.

The temperament of the typical Afghan Hound can be aloof and dignified, but happy and clownish when playing. This breed, as tends to be the case with sighthounds, has a high prey drive and may kill small animals and livestock. Genomic studies have pointed to the Afghan Hound as one of the oldest of dog breeds.

The breed has a reputation among dog trainers of having a relatively slow "obedience intelligence"; Stanley Coren, in his book The Intelligence of Dogs, ranked the breed last among 138 breeds mentioned in ability to understand and obey commands, requiring more than 80 repetitions to understand a new command and obeying on the first command less than 25% of the time. Coren noted that Afghan Hounds were consistently ranked among the least obedient dog breeds among all of the trainers he consulted, with a majority (121 out of 199) ranking the Afghan Hound in the lowest ten breeds out of 133 listed.

== Variants ==
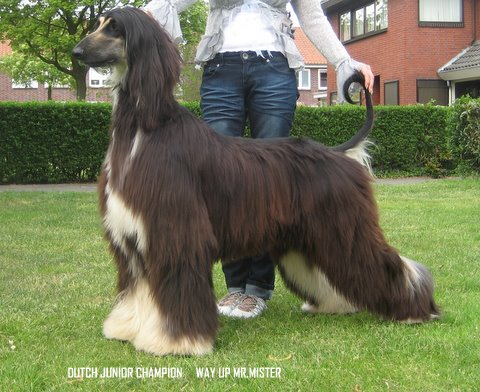
Afghan Hound dark coat

=== Khalag Tazi ===
The Khalag Tazi is a variety of the Afghan Hound introduced to Europe in 1920, when an Indian Army officer, Major G Bell-Murray, brought some animals back from Afghanistan.

=== Bakhmull ===
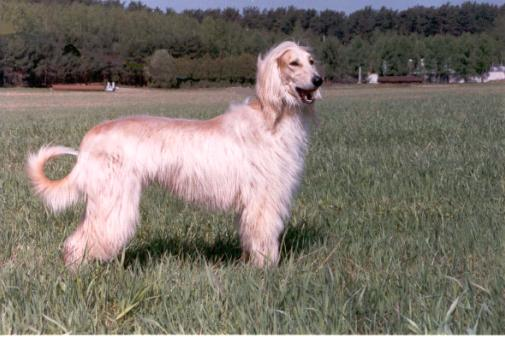
Bakhmull Variant

Bakhmull (Bakhmull Tazi or Tazi Bakhmull, also called the Aboriginal Afghan Hound) is a long-haired variety of sighthound. It has been bred mostly in Russia and claimed to represent an Afghan Hound aboriginal to Afghanistan. In Pashto the word bakhmull (Pashto: بخمول) means "velvet", applied in reference to the dog's silky coat, which is rather abundant and long on the whole body, except the "saddle" (middle to lower back), front parts of all four legs, and the muzzle. Its color is always fawn, ivory, or white, with a darker "saddle", thus it produces an impression of a (yellowish) dog whose coat color matches the khaki sandstone and limestone of the Hindu Kush mountain landscape and deserts. The following colors are not permissible: red, red with white spots, black, and black with white spots.

Since the 1980s, the centre of Bakhmull breeding has been Russia, beginning in Moscow, then spreading to various other places in the CIS. The foundation stock was brought to Russia in the 1970s by military men returning from Afghanistan. Natalia Gherasiova (a breeder, of the Blue Dale el Bark Bakhmull kennel, and dog show judge) established the National Bakhmull Club, affiliated with the Russian Federation for Hunting Dogs (RFOS) and Russian Kynological Federation (RKF). A breed standard was first published in 1985, and a shared RFOS–RKF revision was produced in 1997.

Bakhmulls hunt solo and in couples. Although its coat is long, it does not require much grooming. Paws are well protected from injuries by "feathering" (thick additional paw fur). Its long, velvety coat and its stamina makes more suitable than many breeds for harsh weather. The breed standard calls for "aristocratic gait and a beautiful head with gazelle-like ... eyes". The eyes should be large, brown, slanting upwards, and of almond shape, with rims outlined black. Black coloration is required on the nose and lips for both white and fawn bakhmulls. The dog's height should be between 68–73 centimetres (27–29 in), 65–70 centimetres (26–28 in) for bitches. The height at the withers is 3–4 centimetres (1.2–1.6 in) higher than at the croup.

== Health ==
=== Lifespan ===
A UK study found a life expectancy of 11.1 years for the breed compared to an average of 12.7 for purebreeds and 12 for crossbreeds.

=== Health concerns ===
Major health issues are allergies, cancer, and hip dysplasia. Like other sighthounds, the Afghan Hound is sensitive to anesthesia, as sighthounds have relatively low levels of body fat. Afghan Hounds are also among the dog breeds most likely to develop chylothorax, a rare condition which causes the thoracic ducts to leak, allowing large quantities of chyle fluid to enter the dog's chest cavity. This condition commonly results in a lung-lobe torsion (in which the dog's lung twists within the chest cavity, requiring emergency surgery), due to the breed's typically deep, "barrel"-shaped chest. If not corrected through surgery, chylothorax can ultimately cause fibrosing pleuritis, or a hardening of the organs, due to scar tissue forming around the organs to protect them from the chyle fluid. Chylothorax is often fatal.

Among other health problems are laryngeal paralysis, dilated cardiomyopathy (twice as common in males as females), and dermatological issues such as testosterone-responsive dermatosis of male dogs (often seen in castrated males), nasal depigmentation (also known as Dudley nose), and skin tumours. Afghans are also prone to Central diabetes insipidus (CDI), hypothyroidism and tricholemmoma, a rare condition which mainly affects older dogs in the Middle Ages. Ocular conditions that can occur include medial canthal pocket syndrome (breed predisposition due to shape of head), corneal dystrophy, cataract and generalized progressive retinal atrophy (GPRA). Afghan myelopathy (causing pelvic limb ataxia) is sometimes reported.

== In popular culture ==
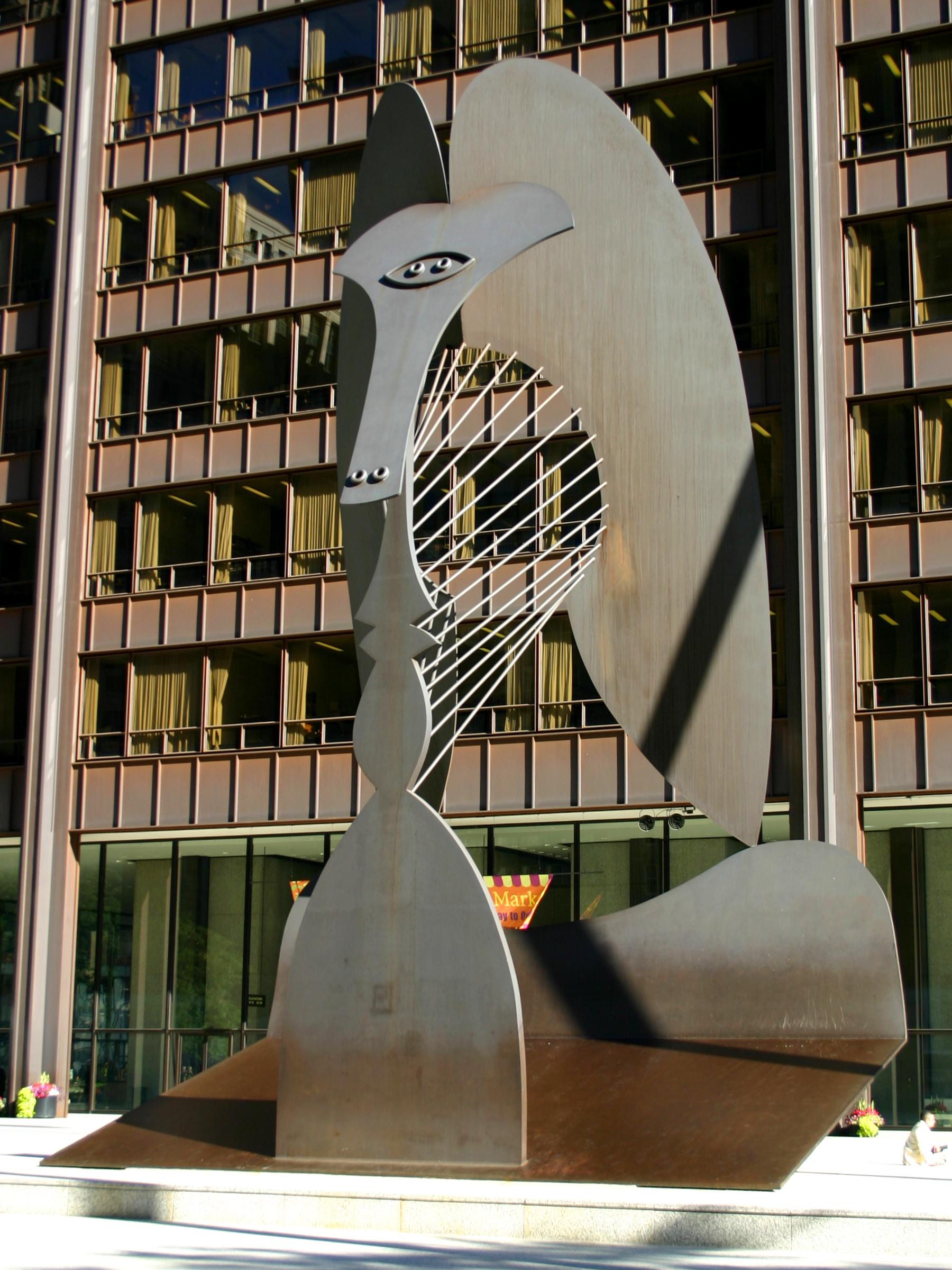
The Chicago Picasso, 1967, by Pablo Picasso, represents the head of an Afghan Hound

Pablo Picasso said that his 1967 statue located in Chicago's Daley Plaza represented the head of an Afghan Hound named Kabul.

The Afghan Hound has been represented in multiple animated feature films and TV shows, including Universal Pictures' Balto (Sylvie), Disney's Lady and the Tramp II: Scamp's Adventure (Ruby), Hasbro Studios's Pound Puppies (Twiggy) and ABC Kids' Bluey (Indy). An Afghan Hound also appeared in the films One Hundred and One Dalmatians, 101 Dalmatians, 102 Dalmatians, and 101 Dalmatians II: Patch's London Adventure. Other examples include Prince Amir of Kinjan from What-a-Mess, Persia from Road Rovers, Desmond from Barney, Burt from Foofur, Laila from Roadside Romeo, and Brainy Barker from Krypto the Superdog. Malory Archer in the show Archer also had an Afghan Hound named Duchess at some point in her son's childhood. An Afghan Hound also appears as a muppet in The Muppets.

In the 1941 novel Between the Acts, Virginia Woolf uses an Afghan Hound named Sohrab to represent aspects of one of the book's human characters.

The Afghan Hound features prominently in the avant-garde music video of French band M83's, "Set in Stone (M83 Remix)".

== See also ==
- List of dog breeds
- Saluki
