= Breed show =

Competition where breeds are judged against a standard and each other

A breed show is a broad term for exhibitions designed to showcase a single animal breed. In most cases, only purebred animals recorded with a breed registry are eligible to enter and compete. A judge or team of judges will evaluate individual animals both in terms of the correct conformation for the species and the specific phenotypical characteristics of the given animal's breed. Breed shows are held for many domesticated animals, including companion animals such as cats and dogs, but also for livestock such as cattle, sheep and horses.

In some cases, shows for many different breeds of animals may be combined in a single event, as in a dog show, were different classes exist for each breed, or, particularly in the case of livestock shows, competition or multiple species of animals may be combined into a single event, such as a county fair, thus allowing organizers to combine fixed costs for common areas such as barns, show rings and the like.

In the case of horses, horse shows limited to a specific breed are very common, and generally include not only the conformation judging common to all animals, but also add performance classes where the animals are either ridden or shown in harness to display their training and underlying athletic ability, manners and temperament. The types of events offered vary from breed to breed, depending on the form and function for which the breed developed.

Judges for breed shows are usually certified by a recognized organization, sometimes for the adjudication of only one breed, but in some cases, judges may be qualified to evaluate multiple breeds of the same animal. In any case, judges need to have a vast amount of knowledge and experience and retain objectivity in spite of any personal preference.

== See also ==
- Agricultural show
- Cat show
- Livestock show
- Animal show
