= Dog show judge =

Person who evaluates and awards dogs at a dog show

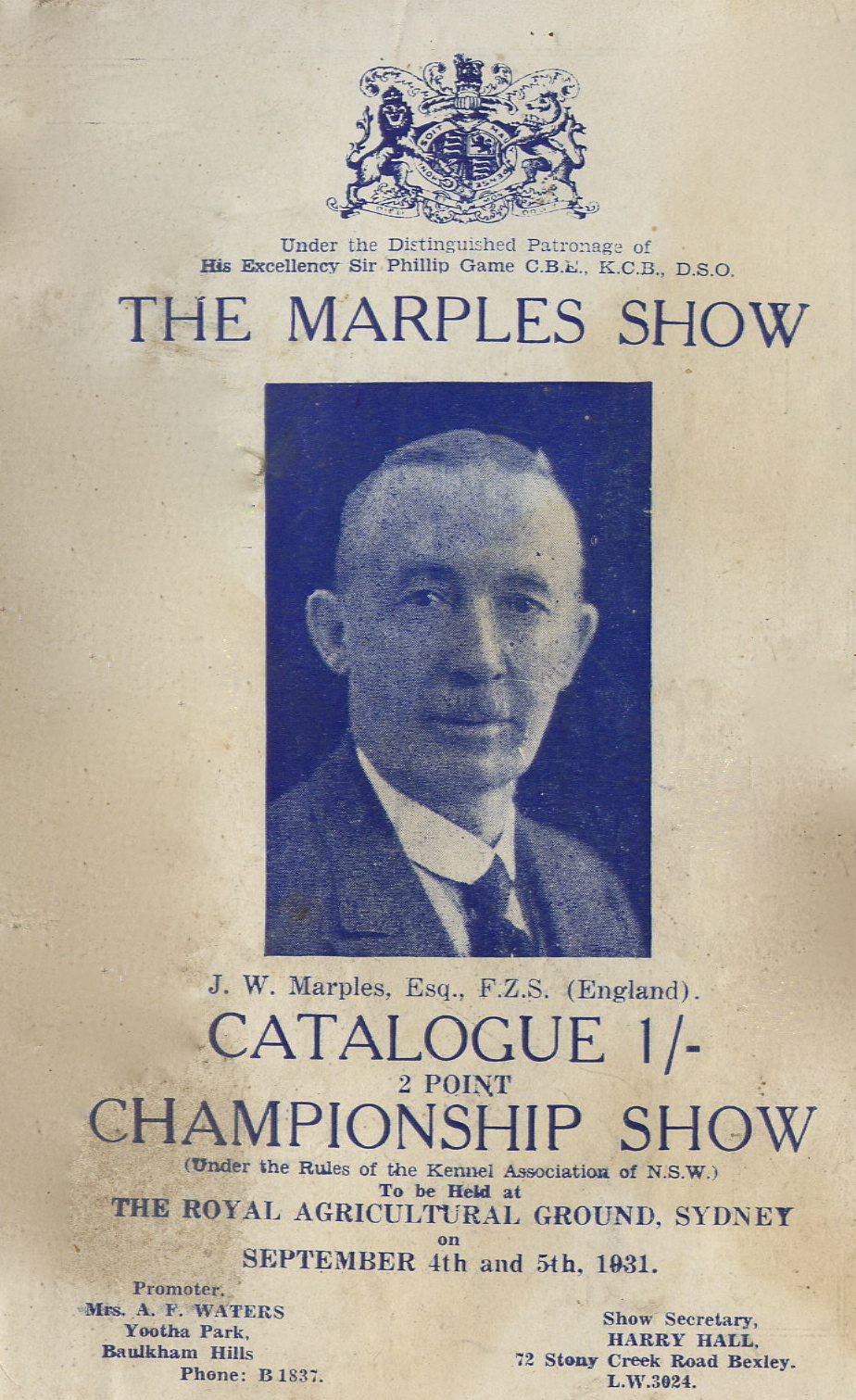
J.W. Marples, son of founder of Our Dogs, Theo Marples

A dog show judge, sometimes dog judge, is a person that is qualified to evaluate dogs at a conformation show. At small shows, there might be only one judge for all breeds and classes. At larger shows, there might be several judges, with each responsible for only certain breeds or classes.

== Qualifications ==
Because dogs are judged based on how well they conform to their breed's breed standard, a judge must be intimately familiar with the particular breed's standard and must be able to analyze the qualities of the dog to determine its relative quality.

Usually a license as a dog judge is granted by either a breed association or a kennel club. The license specifies the different breeds over which the judge is qualified to officiate. Judges may study and, over time, apply for a license to judge a single breed, multiple breeds, or all recognized breeds. A judge who has successfully completed the requirements for judging all of the dog groups is known as a group judge. A judge who is licensed to judge all breeds is often referred to as an "all-rounder".

In some cases the qualification and membership of a National-based organisation is the criteria as to how a judge might operate. A few international groups and accreditation also exist

== Travelling judges ==
Judges are most commonly licensed specifically to the registry with which they are affiliated (for example, American Kennel Club judges judge AKC shows). However, some registries choose to recognize licensed judges from other registries and organizations. Judging outside of one's country or registry is often an indication of a particular appreciation of that judge's skills and knowledge.

== Famous judges ==
Some judges who are regulars at the larger English or American dog shows become well known among dog show participants and breeders and gain respect from large audiences for their ability to recognise good examples of the breeds that they judge. The reputations of the founder of Our Dogs, Theo Marples, and his son J.W. Marples, are examples of a family of well known judges.
