= Kerry Bog Village =

Open air museum in Kerry, Ireland

Coordinates: 52.074°N 9.882°W

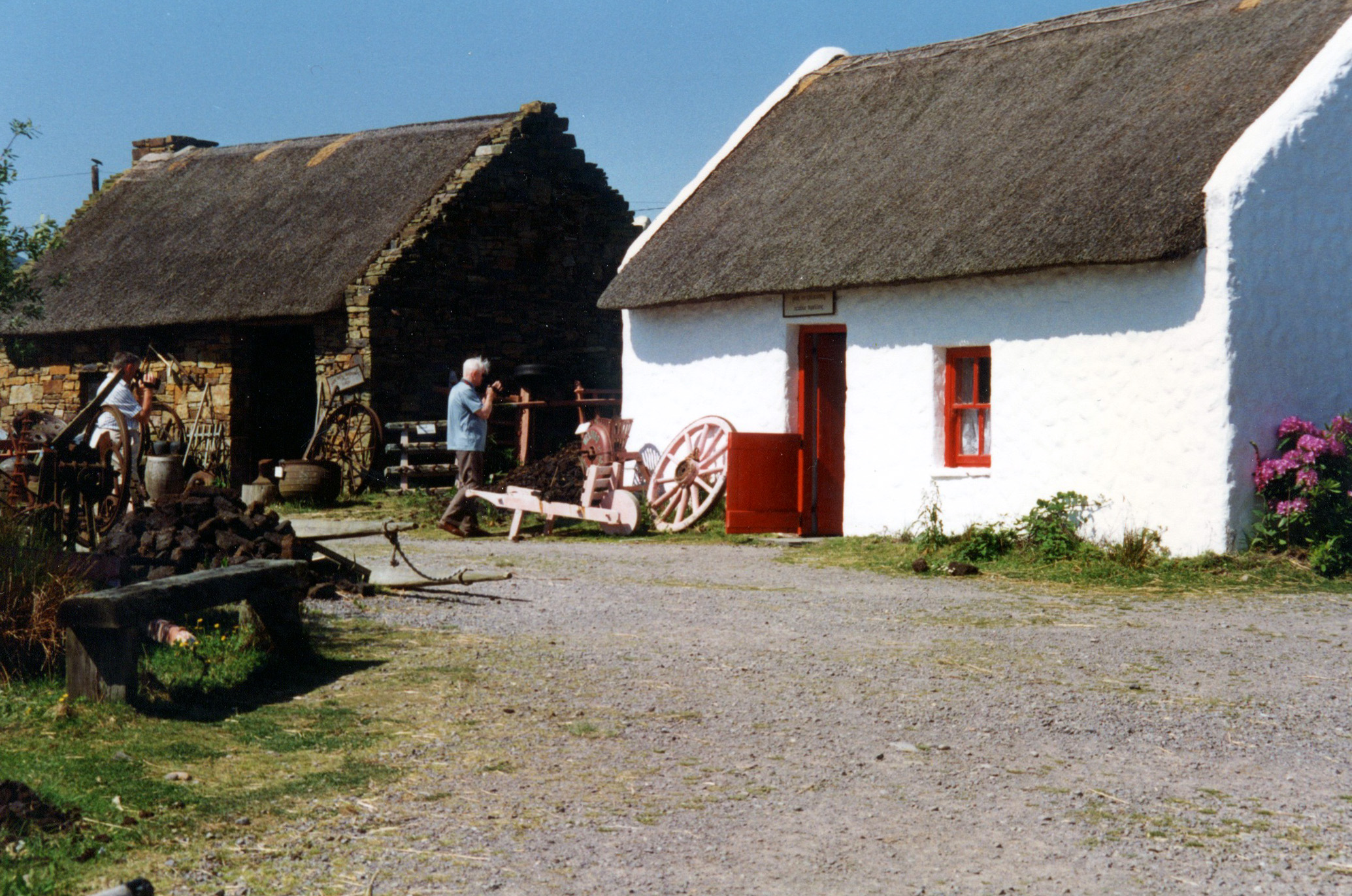
Recreated cottages at the Kerry Bog Village

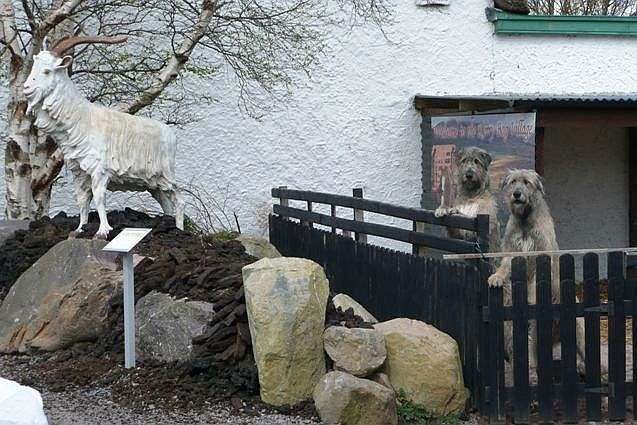
Cottage entrance

The Kerry Bog Village is an open-air museum situated in west County Kerry focused on the history of Ireland and culture. It is a popular tourist stop along the Ring of Kerry, between the towns of Killorglin and Glenbeigh. The outdoor museum recreates traditional Irish thatched cottages and the lives of their inhabitants during the 19th century. The museum founder also played a role in reviving the Kerry Bog Pony as a viable breed.

The village's operators describe it as the “only one of its kind in Europe,” referring to its unique combination of restored 19th-century thatched cottages, traditional rural artifacts, and efforts to revive the Kerry Bog Pony breed.
