= World Dog Show =

International dog show

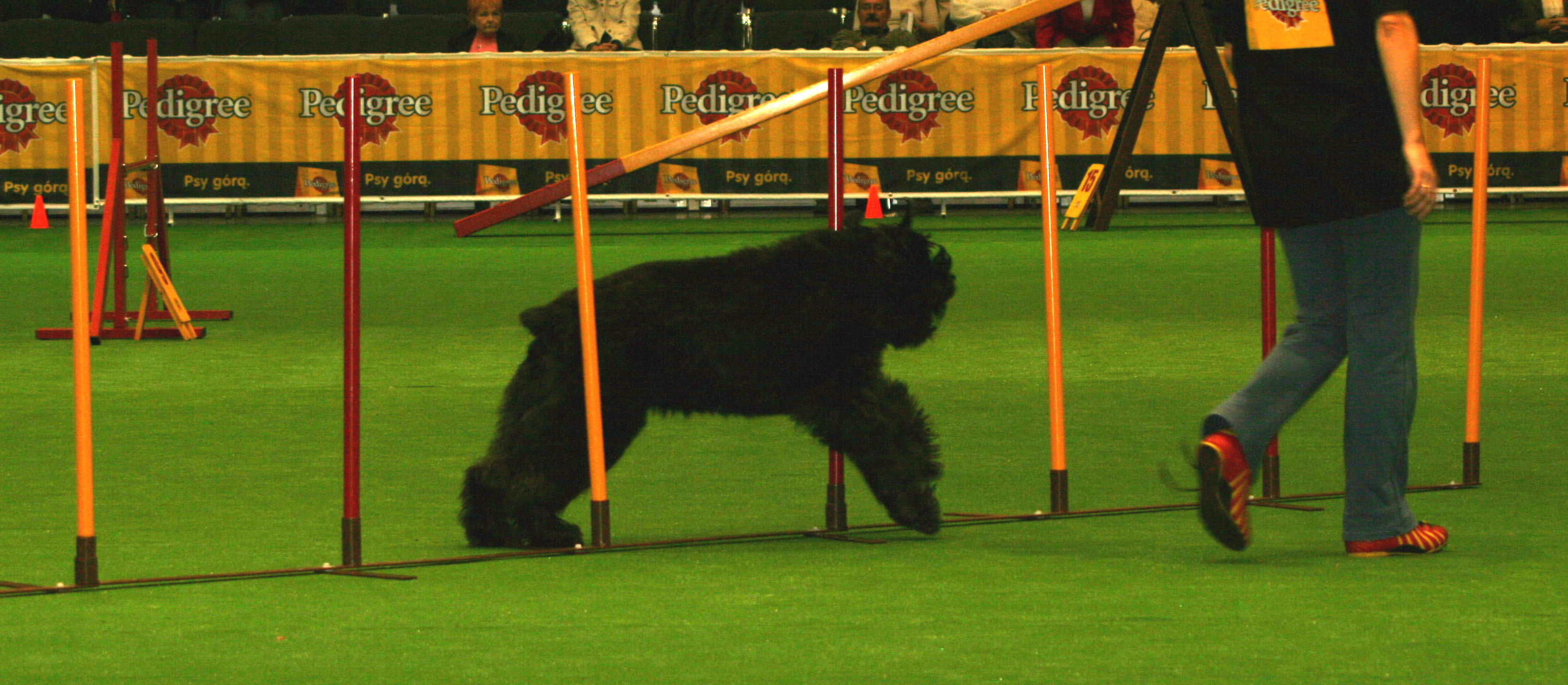
World Show Agility Trial, 2006

The World Dog Show (WDS) is a Fédération Cynologique Internationale (FCI)-sanctioned, four- to six-day-long international dog show. In its current iteration, it has been held yearly in conjunction with the FCI General Assembly meeting since 1974. Several FCI international dog shows informally dubbed "world dog shows" were sporadically held prior to 1974; information for those shows will be included where available.

The WDS has been called "the most important dog show in the world". The World Show includes agility, obedience, junior handler, conformation, and other events and demonstrations. Dogs who win in any category are awarded the title "World Winner". It is one of the largest dog shows in the world, with shows attracting upwards of 10,000 entrants, sometimes exceeding 20,000 to rival Crufts in total entry count. It is held in a different country each year. The show is for all three of FCI’s Sections: European Section, Sección de las Américas y el Caribe, and Asia, Africa & Oceania, which all also have an individual dog show each year.

The top title at the event is Certificat d'Aptitude au Championnat International de Beauté (French for 'Certificate of Aptitude at the International Championship of Beauty'), abbreviated CACIB, for which only purebred specimens of fully recognised, standardised breeds, not provisionally recognised or experimental breeds, may qualify. Dogs of provisionally recognized breeds are still eligible to earn "World Winner" titles, however. Some people feel that a win at the World Dog Show is worth more, reputation-wise, than the same win at the Westminster Kennel Club show. Entries in the World Show are from Fédération Cynologique Internationale member clubs, and non-member clubs (such as the American Kennel Club) by invitation.

== Show locations and conformation show winners ==
Name	Home Country	Breeder	Owner	Breed	Year	Location	Number of entries	References
					Early to mid 1930s	Western Europe		
					1950s	Western Europe		
					1956	Dortmund, Germany		
					1971	Budapest, Hungary	~3,500	
Donnar de Nordval	Brazil	Angelo de Agostini	Olney Diaz	German Shepherd	1972	Brazil	732	
					1973	Dortmund, Germany	4,900	
Ungos de Laketania				Catalan Shepherd	1974	Paris, France	2,832	
Sugar River Foxfire	USA (born); Italy (residence)			Alaskan Malamute	1975	Rabat, Morocco	509	
					1976	Innsbruck, Austria	4,478	
Dark von der Bismarckquelle	Germany	Axel Möhrke		Wire Fox Terrier	1977	Herning, Denmark	3,883	
Mundial Cinko Duda Csebi	Mexico	Roberto Hernández Ávalos	Karen Daly de Hernandez	Puli	1978	Mexico City, Mexico	4,000	
					1979	Bern, Switzerland	5,500	
Beseeka Knight Errant of Silkstone	UK (born); South Africa (residence)	M & M (Mesdames) Lumb and Hughes	Anna Kartsounis; Gary Kartsounis; Roma E. Wright-Smith	Whippet	1980	Verona, Italy	4,300	
Saliha Deianira	Germany (born); Netherlands (residence)	Dr. Egon Knoll; Angela Knoll	Tim Teillers	Saluki	1981	Dortmund, Germany	8,836	
Fujimiland Julia	Japan			Yorkshire Terrier	1982	Tokyo, Japan	1,404	
Tigre	Spain		Luis Esquiro Bolanos	Spanish Mastiff	1983	Madrid, Spain	3,097	
Kishniga's Diaghilev	Canada (born); Mexico (residence)	Richard Meen; John Reeve-Newson	Carlos & Mirna Cantu	Borzoi	1984	Acapulco, Mexico	784	
Abrisa vom Felsenkeller	Germany (born); Netherlands (residence)	Claus Hess	Tim Teillers	Saluki	1985	Amsterdam, Netherlands	10,093	
Abrisa vom Felsenkeller	Germany (born); Netherlands (residence)	Claus Hess	Tim Teillers	Saluki	1986	Tulln, Austria	7,952	
Northwind's Rising Star	USA	Jacob Feinberg	Jacob Feinberg	Samoyed	1987	Tel Aviv, Israel	1,274	
Northwind's Rising Star	USA	Jacob Feinberg	Jacob Feinberg	Samoyed	1988	Lima, Peru	730	
Chouan Gimlet	Denmark	Gunner Nymann; Holger Busk	Gunner Nymann; Holger Busk; Helen Ingher	Petit Basset Griffon Vendeen	1989	Copenhagen, Denmark	9,473	
Chakpori's Mao	Netherlands	Anke & Ruud de Wijs	Bianca Saasen	Lhasa Apso	1990	Brno, Czechoslovakia	11,942	
Fanto vom Hirschell	Germany			German Shepherd	1991	Dortmund, Germany	13,427	
Caligola di Ponzano	Italy	Mario Querci	Antonio Pegoli	Neapolitan Mastiff	1992	Valencia, Spain	6,664	
Eddie Tato von Norwalfer	Argentina	Norma & Walter Soler	Alberto Sanchez	Great Dane	1993	Buenos Aires, Argentina	2,178	
Arctic Blue Senator	Spain			Siberian Husky	1994	Bern, Switzerland	15,571	
Humphrey dos Sete Moinhos	Portugal		José Homem de Mello	Basset Hound	1995	Brussels, Belgium	14,164	
Sanallah's Jerome	USA (born); Italy (residence)	Sandra L & Al F Weinraub	Roberto Bongiovanni	Afghan Hound	1996	Vienna, Austria/Budapest, Hungary	11,833	
Afton's Absolut	USA	Jeanne Silva	Carolee Douglas; Jeanne & Christopher Silva	American Cocker Spaniel	1997	San Juan, Puerto Rico	4,060	
Loteki Supernatural Being	USA	Lou Ann King	Lou Ann King & John Oulton	Papillon	1998	Helsinki, Finland	15,295	
Tacara's Santer Savar	USA	Sandra Pritchard; Terry Pritchard; Linda L Newsome	Kim Smirl; Wanda Sako; Linda L Newsome	Belgian Shepherd Tervueren	1999	Mexico City, Mexico	4,000	
Giaccherebbe dell'Angelo del Summano	Italy	Tranquillo Segalla	I. Maeder	Bracco Italiano	2000	Milan, Italy	15,200	
Atwater Crazy-Diamond Borgoleonardo	Portugal	Maria Amelia Taborda	Fernando Bastos Gomes	Newfoundland	2001	Porto, Portugal	7,282	
Topscore Contradiction	Norway		Mr and Mrs Glenna	Standard Poodle	2002	Amsterdam, Netherlands	14,520	
Propwash Syzygy	USA	Leslie Frank	Leslie Frank	Australian Shepherd	2003	Dortmund, Germany	18,716	
Double D Cinoblu's Masterpiece	USA (born); Brazil (residence)	Silvia Beloff; Sonia Couto	Ann Joe Sampaio	Pug	2004	Rio de Janeiro, Brazil	2,060	
Homero del Alcazar	Argentina			Lhasa Apso	2005	Buenos Aires, Argentina	2,806	
Axel del Monte Alago	Italy		Bitte Ahrens Primavera	Bracco Italiano	2006	Poznan, Poland	20,869	
Smash JP Talk About	Japan	Yujijo Omura	Mamoro Oyama	Toy Poodle	2007	Mexico City, Mexico	5,528	
Efbe's Hidalgo At Goodspice	Canada (born); USA (residence)	France Bergeron	Margery Good; Richard Good; Sandra Middlebrooks	Sealyham Terrier	2008	Stockholm, Sweden	20,661	
Northgate's As You Like It	Finland (born); Sweden (residence)	Hanna Ukura; Kari Ukura	Jenny Hall	Pharaoh Hound	2009	Bratislava, Slovakia	21,140	
Smash JP Talk About	Japan	Yujijo Omura	Mamoro Oyama	Toy Poodle	2010	Herning, Denmark	18,988	
De Kaner's Wolverine Revenge	Italy (born); Spain (residence)	Francisco Garcia	Nati Diestro	American Akita	2011	Paris, France	21,588	
Shiraz California Dreamin'	USA (born); Sweden (residence)	Michael & Elena Edwards; Valerie Nunes-Atkinson	Nicklas Eriksson; Ingunn Solberg	Saluki	2012	Salzburg, Austria	18,608	
Bottom Shaker My Secret	Hungary	István Szetmár; Jozsef Koroknai	Jozsef Koroknai	Old English Sheepdog	2013	Budapest, Hungary	18,002	
Tricky Ricky From Yarrow-Hi Tech	Indonesia		Jongkie Budiman; Mieke Cooijmans	Affenpinscher	2014	Helsinki, Finland	21,266	
Ops I Did It Again Del Cuore Impavido	Italy	Filippo Ripoli	Olga Klimova	Bearded Collie	2015	Milan, Italy	19,923	
Fine Lady S Zolotogo Grada	Russia	Svetlana Zolotova	Ekaterina Zaytseva	Black Russian Terrier	2016	Moscow, Russia	19,295	
Queenie Eye Del Castelo Levante	Italy		Patrizia Vidano	Great Dane	2017	Leipzig, Germany	24,692	
Frosty Snowman	Netherlands	Phil Reid	Gwen Huikeshoven; Phil Reid	Grand Basset Griffon Vendéen	2018	Amsterdam, Netherlands	17,628	
Realline Final Boss	South Korea	Kim Jong-oh	Kim Jong-oh	Pembroke Welsh Corgi	2019	Shanghai, China	1,881	
Funfair Foxhound	Italy	Davide Valli	Davide Valli	Wire Fox Terrier	2020 (Due to pandemic was held in 2022)	Madrid, Spain	6,835	
L'End Show Metti Surprise At Glare	Russia	Elena Pykhtar	Elena Pykhtar	Bedlington Terrier	2021	Brno, Czech Republic	12,159	
BR Pepper’s Shades Of Joy	Brazil	Charly Andrade	Charly Andrade; Edina Mendes	Shih Tzu	2022	São Paulo, Brazil	3,833	
Aquafortis Robel The One	Norway	Runi Kristiansen	Runi Kristiansen; Terje Kristiansen	Portuguese Water Dog	2023	Geneva, Switzerland	13,406	
Zaida Bint Muti Von Haussman	Chile	Ramón Podestá	Ramón Podestá; Scott Pfeil; James Donahue; Armando Sobrado	Afghan Hound	2024	Zagreb, Croatia	14,850	
Black Majesty Some Say	Croatia	Iva Raic	Iva Raic	Petit Basset Griffon Vendéen	2025	Helsinki, Finland	15,720	
Tanuzza Dei Raggi Di Luna	Italy	Sergio Anconetti; Gaetano Caldarone	Sergio Anconetti; Gaetano Caldarone	Italian Greyhound	2026	Bologna, Italy	16,053	
TBD				TBD	2027	Wels, Austria	TBD	
TBD				TBD	2028	Mexico City, Mexico	TBD	
TBD				TBD	2029	Poland	TBD	
TBD				TBD	2030	Brno, Czech Republic	TBD	
