= Topscore Contradiction =

Show dog

Ch. Topscore Contradiction
- Other name: King
- Species: Canis lupus familiaris
- Breed: Poodle (standard)
- Sex: Male
- Born: 20 September 1998
- Title: Best in Show at Cruft's
- Term: 2002–2003
- Predecessor: Ch. Jethard Cidevant (Basenji)
- Successor: Ch. Yakee A Dangerous Liaison (Pekingese)
- Owners: Mr and Mrs Glenna

NORD Ch. Topscore Contradiction (born 20 September 1998), also known as King, was a standard Poodle, who won Best in Show at Crufts in 2002. He was the first overseas dog and the first undocked dog from a breed which was previously docked in the UK to win the title.

== Early life ==
Topscore Contradiction was owned by Mr and Mrs Glenna, of Porsgrunn, Norway. King was never docked as it is illegal in Norway.

== Show career ==
King won a number of shows in his native Norway, and in Sweden prior to 2002. Topscore Contradiction was entered into Crufts in 2002, the year after British quarantine laws were relaxed and foreign dogs were allowed to enter the competition. Some 21,000 dogs were entered in the competition that year, 343 of which were dogs brought from overseas specifically to enter the competition; mostly brought over from the Netherlands.

Handled by Michael Nilson, he competed in the Best in Show round against a Flat-Coated Retriever, a Giant Schnauzer, an Old English Sheepdog, a Saluki, a Wire Fox Terrier and a Pekingese. He was named Best in Show, with the Pekingese dog Ch. Yakee A Dangerous Liaison being named Reserve Best in Show. The Pekingese would go on to win the event in the following year. He was the first foreign dog to win Crufts, Topscore Contradiction was entered and also the undocked dog from a traditionally docked breed, having won the competition a year before it became illegal to dock a dog in the UK.

One of his owners, Kari Glenna said of the win, "I don't believe it. I am very excited and very nervous. He is just a family pet, not a show dog. I never expected this." The Best in Show judge, Pamela Cross, called him a "poodley poodle", and that "Constructionally he was very well made. He epitomised his breed." His victory completed a winning year for the Poodle breed, with miniature Ch. Poodle Surrey Spice Girl winning Best in Show at the Westminster Kennel Club Dog Show in New York earlier in the year.
