= Junior showmanship =

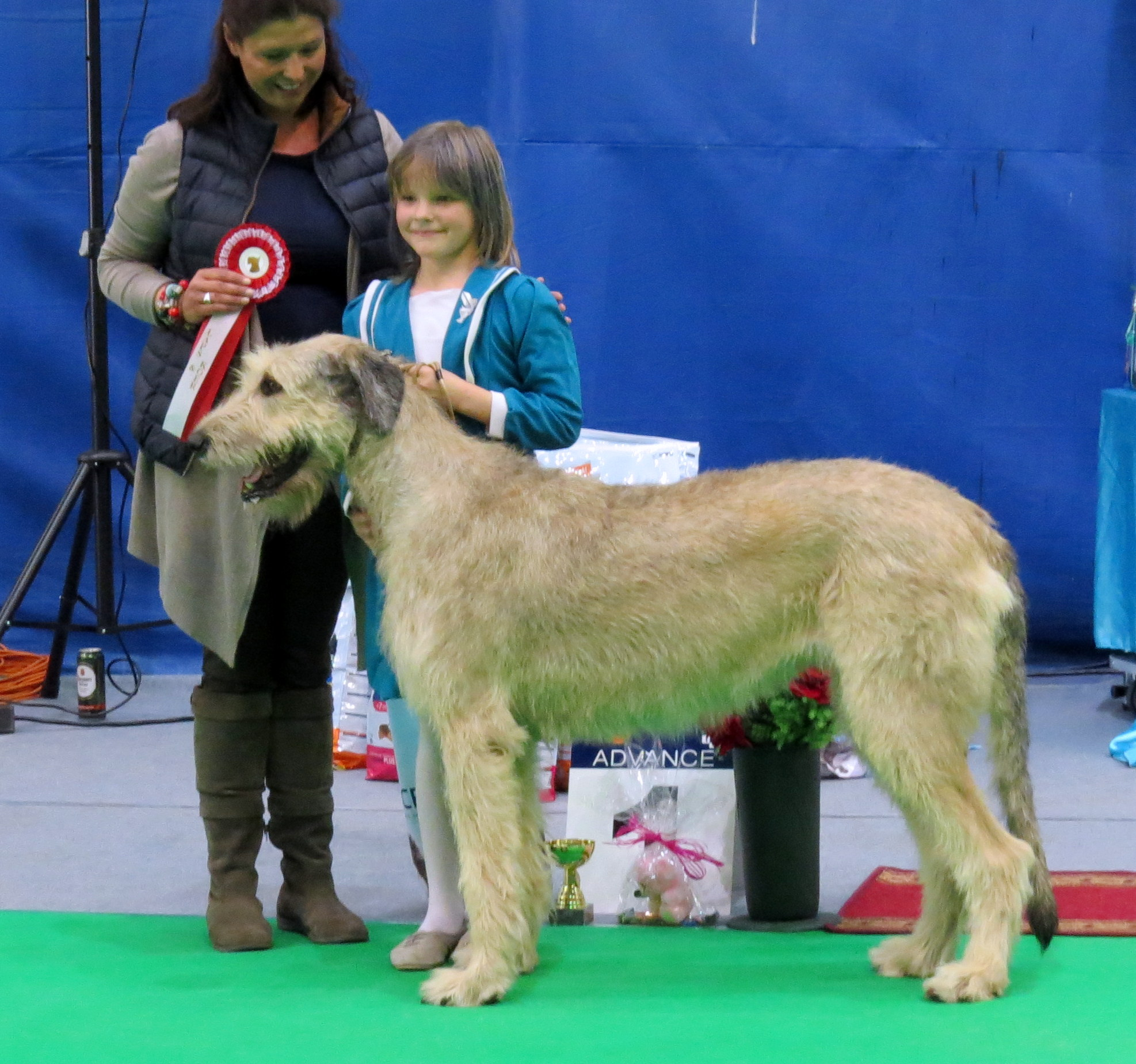
A junior handler and her Irish Wolfhound at a junior dog show

Junior showmanship (also called junior handling) is a sport for young people (called "Juniors") in which they exhibit their dog handling skills in an event similar to a conformation dog show. Unlike a conformation show, it is the young handlers who are judged, not their dogs.

== History ==
County agricultural fairs in the United States began holding livestock judging contests for members of the 4-H, a club run by state agricultural extensions for children of farm families, in the early 1900s. Showmanship, in which the child was judged for ability to display "an animal to its greatest advantage" was a component of livestock judging. As the idea of 4-H as a youth development club, not just a club for future agriculturalists, spread around the world, horses and pet animals were added to showmanship categories.

The first dog handling competition for children at a formal dog show was held in 1932 at the Westbury Kennel Club Show in Long Island, New York, in the United States. In 1933 the Westminster Kennel Club in New York offered a children's handling class, and prizes were established in the names of early promoters of children's events, Leonard Brumby, Sr, and George F. Foley. The American Kennel Club recognized Junior Showmanship as a dog show class in 1971.

Today, major Junior Showmanship competition is offered worldwide through Fédération Cynologique Internationale clubs, as well as through the Kennel Club (UK), The Canadian Kennel Club, The American Kennel Club, The United Kennel Club (US), as well as 4-H and similar clubs. Other show-giving dog clubs and businesses may also offer Junior Showmanship events.

== Purpose ==
Learning sportsmanship and developing knowledge of the dog are given as the purpose for Junior Showmanship (Junior Handling) by most organizations. The Junior learns sportsmanship, ring procedures, and grooming and showing techniques specific to the dog he or she is showing, and develops a close bond with the dog. For the major show-giving bodies, Junior Showmanship can also be an apprenticeship in dog handling, preparing young people for careers in dog handling, raising, and training.

== Eligibility ==
In general, children and young people may compete with dogs of any breed or in some cases, mixed breed dogs. Competition is by age group, in various classification levels. Rules are specific to each show giving organization.

Children as young as two years old are allowed in the ring by the United Kennel Club (US), at age four by the Canadian Kennel Club, at age six by the Kennel Club (UK), and at age nine by the American Kennel Club and the 4-H. All end eligibility at age eighteen except for the Kennel Club (UK), which allows Juniors to compete until they are 24. Fédération Cynologique Internationale clubs have similar rules.

== Nature of the competition ==
The Junior Showmanship competition is organized in a similar manner to a conformation dog show. The Juniors are separated into their age and experience levels, and enter the ring in order of the size of their dog. The juniors must move their dogs around the ring according to the instructions of the judge in pre determined patterns. The judge notes whether or not the Junior follows instructions correctly and presents the dog properly according to the dog's breed or type. Dogs are examined as in a conformation show, but the emphasis is on how the Junior interacts with the dog and the judge, not on the quality of the dog.

At the basic or novice level, children are judged on how well they follow the judge's instructions, their understanding of ring procedure and of the standard of the breed or type of dog they are showing. In some clubs, the children may be quizzed or questioned by the judge.

In close competition between advanced Juniors, judging is also based on the Junior's knowledge of his or her dog's faults, and how well they disguise the faults through skillful handling so that "what a judge observes are animals at the top of their form."

== Related activities ==
Junior Showmanship is a sport limited to children and young people, but many young handlers also enter adult show classes in conformation and performance (obedience, agility, hunting events, flyball, etc.) as well. Some organizations have set up separate performance event categories for junior handlers.

== Judging ==
As junior handling is a separate sport from regular conformation showing, judges are usually given separate training and are expected to know the rules for the sport. Westminster continues to be the "crown jewel" of the Juniors Competition. Only one winner of Best Junior Handler at this prestigious show has ever returned to judge the event.
