= PennHIP =

US dog health evaluation program

PennHIP (an acronym for "University of Pennsylvania Hip Improvement Program") is a program which evaluates the quality of the hips in dogs. The program was established at the University of Pennsylvania School of Veterinary Medicine by Gail Smith in 1993, with the primary objective of reducing the prevalence of hip dysplasia in dogs. To assess a dog's hip joints, three radiographs (X-rays) are taken from different angles while the dog is under general anesthesia. Radiographs are submitted to the PennHIP for assessment, and are assigned a score, called a distraction index. Veterinarians must be trained members of the PennHIP Network in order to take radiographs for these assessments. The scheme is available through veterinarians in the United States and Canada. It was considered as the most evidence-based radiographic method to diagnose hip dysplasia.

== History ==
The PennHIP method was developed by Gail Smith at the University of Pennsylvania in 1983 with the current radiographic submission system dating back to 1993.

In the 1990s, the Penn Center for Innovation (PCI) licensed PennHIP to a corporation, with Smith taking it back in 2002 and turning it into a not-for-profit service at Penn Vet. Recently, PCI facilitated the sale of PennHIP to Antech Imaging Services (Antech Diagnostics, Inc.), it is now called AIS PennHIP.

== Configurations and technique ==
The major quality of the PennHIP for the performing veterinarians is it gives an early indication for developing osteoarthritis of canine hip dysplasia as early as 16 weeks of the dogs age. The method requires the dogs to be under heavy sedation or anesthetized in dorsal recumbency position to eliminate muscle tension. Three radiographic exposures are made of the coxofemoral joint to evaluate the hip quality and quantitatively measure the joint laxity as following 1) distraction radiograph, 2) compression radiograph 3) ventrodorsal hip-extended radiograph with the distraction device being placed between the legs in neutral position and hips are distracted. The device acts as a fulcrum at the level of the proximal femur to lateralize the femoral heads when the performing veterinarian exerts minimal adduction force.

The first two previously mentioned radiographs are used to obtain precise measurements on laxity and joint congruence, while the extended view is needed to collect further information on osteoarthritis if present. The purpose of these RXs is to obtain a technological calculated value that in the end an index of the joint laxity is given with less vulnerability to errors in comparison to the qualitative methods.

The quantitative measure is called the distraction index (DI) which is the measurement of the maximal femoral head displacement from the acetabulum. It is calculated by dividing the distance between the geometric centre of the femoral head and the geometric centre of the acetabulum by the radius of the femoral head. The degree of presence of osteoarthritis increases as the DI value go over 0.3, meaning that the dog is in a higher risk of developing the condition.

== Alternatives ==
- Norberg angle (NA): which measures the femoral head displacement from the acetabulum. It is calculated by drawing a line that connects between two dots that are located at the centre of each femoral head centre and another line that connects one of the first dots to the craniolateral acetabular rim on the same femoral head. A normal NA is ≥105 degrees.
- Percentage of femoral head coverage (%FHC): it measures the femoral head displacement from the acetabulum. The percent is considered normal or concluding that the dog has a good hip joint congruity when the percent is ≥50% coverage.
- Dorsolateral hip testing using radiography and CT: dog is in sternal recumbency position and kneeling.
- Pelvic stress radiography: dog is in dorsal recumbency position, femur is in 60° angle while the vet is manually pushing it in a craniodorsal direction.

== Drawbacks ==
- The technique can only be performed by a certified veterinarian or vet technician as they must take certain training course and they have to submit trial radiographs that shows their level of proficiency to get their certificate approved.
- Not recognized by the American Kennel Club
- Requires anesthesia.
- Higher cost compared to the alternatives that ranges between $200-400.

== See also ==
- Orthopedic Foundation for Animals
