= Orthopedic Foundation for Animals =

American non-profit veterinarian organization

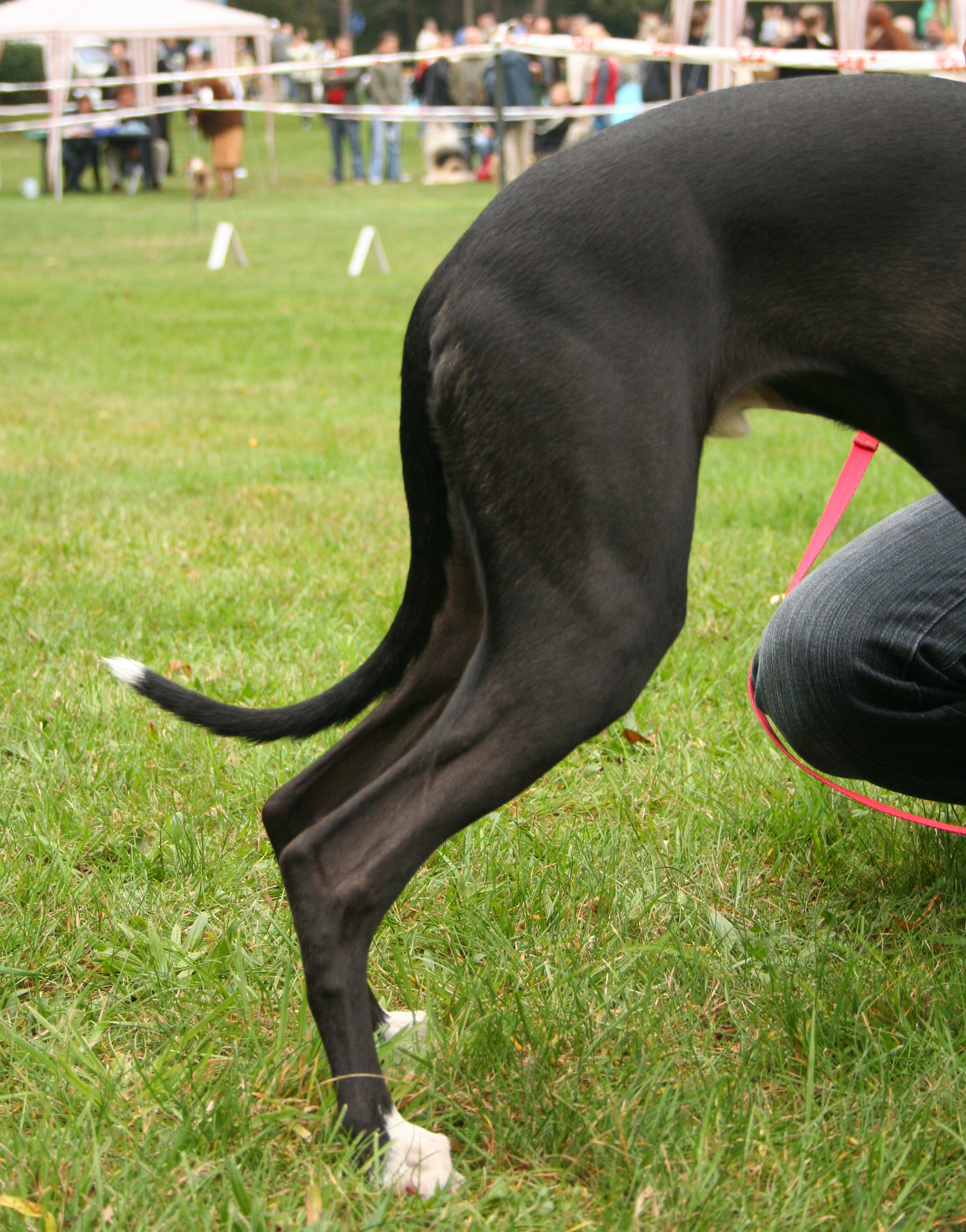
The hips and hind legs of a Whippet

The Orthopedic Foundation for Animals (OFA) is a private, nonprofit organization based in Columbia, Missouri. The organization researches the prevention of orthopedic and hereditary diseases in companion animals.

The OFA funds research (nearly $3 million) on inherited diseases in pets through organizations like AKC CHF and Morris Animal Foundation. Their focus leans towards understanding these diseases at the molecular level.

== History ==
The OFA was founded by John M. Olin in 1966, after several of his dogs became affected by hip dysplasia. While initially focused on hip dysplasia, today the OFA has health databases on a wide range of diseases including: elbow dysplasia, patellar luxation, Legg–Calvé–Perthes, thyroid, cardiac, congenital deafness, sebaceous adenitis, and shoulder O.C.D. The methodology of the evaluation is considered a subjective method. There are other methodologies in practice that include a Distraction Index for Penn Hip evaluations, an objective scoring method practiced by the British Veterinary Association, and an evaluative grade based on point by point criterion in the Federation Cynologique International system.

The OFA offers DNA certification for canine degenerative myelopathy, neuronal ceroid lipofuscinosis for American Bulldogs, Fanconi syndrome for Basenjis, and neonatal encephalopathy with seizures for Standard Poodles. This is done through an exclusive agreement with the University of Missouri.

== Online database searches ==
Dogs (and cats) that have had an OFA certification issued can be searched by name, part of name, or registration number. Results include all OFA certifications for the animal, and sire, dam, siblings, half-siblings, and offspring.

== See also ==
- PennHIP
- American Kennel Club
