= Obedience trial =

Dog sport

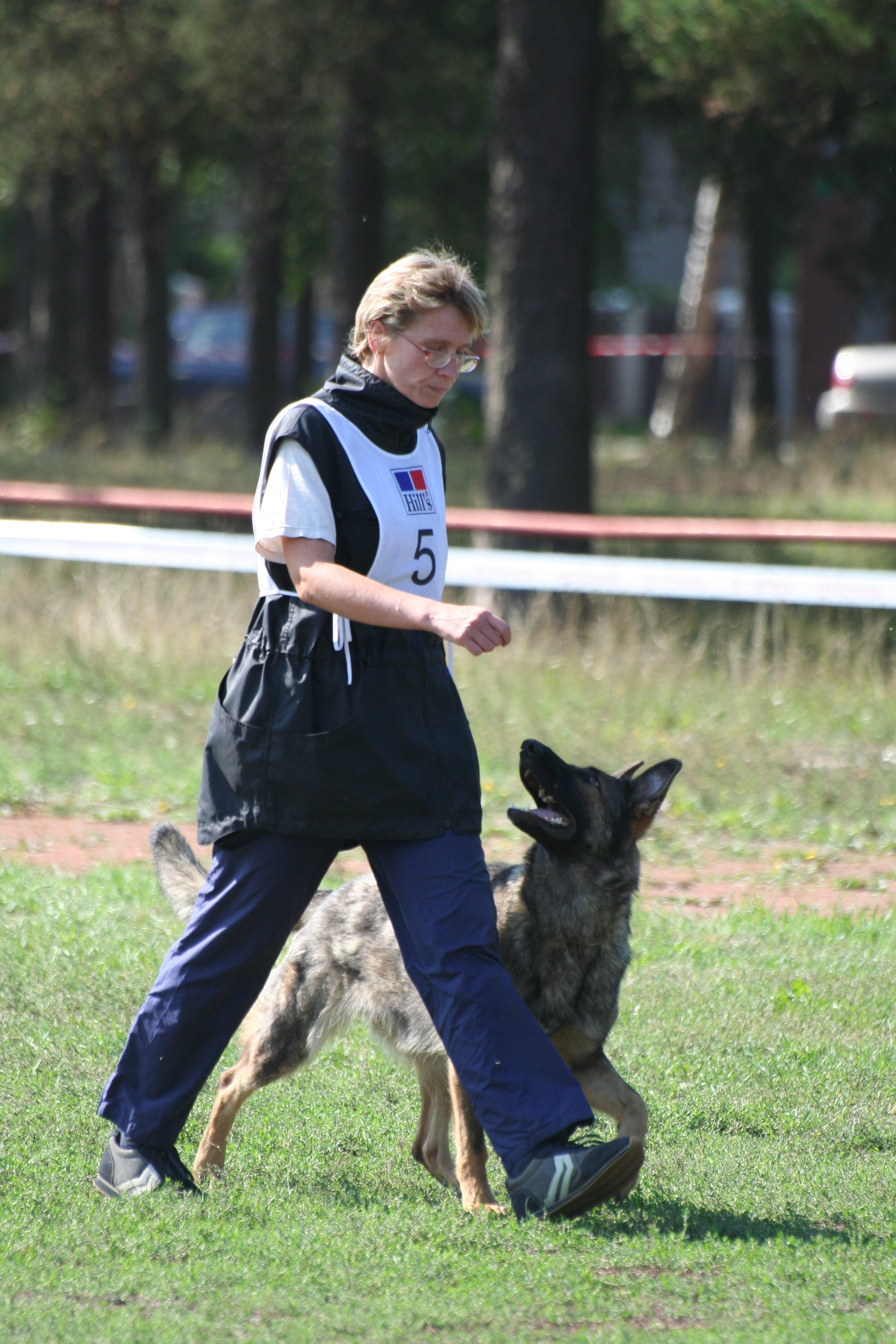
A dog heeling at an obedience trial

An obedience trial is a dog sport in which a dog must perfectly execute a predefined set of tasks when directed to do so by his handler. According to the American Kennel Club (AKC) obedience regulations

The basic objective of obedience trials, however, is to recognize dogs that have been trained to behave in the home, in public places, and in the presence of other dogs, in a manner that will reflect credit on the sport of obedience at all times and under all conditions.

Training a dog to participate in AKC obedience trials increases a dog's understanding and reliability in responding to commands such as "sit", "down", "stay", "come", and "heel". At a trial, the dog and handler will perform various predefined obedience exercises, which will be evaluated and scored by a judge. The dog must demonstrate basic proficiency in order to receive a passing score (170 points out of a possible 200, and more than 50% of the points allocated to each exercise). A handler may choose to train for higher degrees of accuracy and style in order to receive more points. For example, on a recall, to receive a perfect score the dog must come at a trot or run directly to the handler, without sniffing or veering to one side, and sit straight in front of the handler, not at an angle or off to one side or the other.

The dog and handler teams with the four highest scores in a given class will receive placement ribbons, and sometimes additional prizes. All dogs that receive a passing, or "qualifying" score earn a "leg" towards an obedience title. When a dog has accumulated the requisite number of legs for a given title, the AKC will issue a certificate to the dog's owner recognizing that accomplishment.

Obedience competition provides an opportunity for a person and a dog to work as a highly tuned team. Training for obedience trials can provide much needed mental stimulation and physical activity for a bored housepet, and provide a fun and challenging hobby for the dog's owner.

== Competition obedience exercises ==
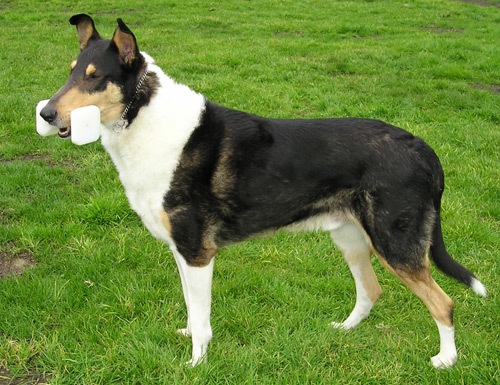
This Smooth Collie retrieves an obedience dumbbell made of wood; others are made of metal or plastic.

The exact name and requirements of obedience exercises vary depending on who is sanctioning any given competition. However, the list of exercises below provides a general description of what a dog and handler can expect at most obedience trials.

Depending on who has sanctioned the given trial dogs are divided into classes based on their proficiency, age, or their handlers experience. Most organizations break down the dog and handler teams into novice, intermediate, and advanced classes. The American Kennel Club (AKC) calls these three classes, Novice, Open (intermediate), and Utility (advanced). The AKC then further divides these classes into "A" and "B" classes: i.e. Novice "A" or Open "B". The Novice "A" class is reserved for handlers who have never before shown a dog and earned a title in obedience. Other "A" classes have restrictions on the handler's or dog's experience.

Depending on the level of the class a dog and handler may be expected to perform as few as five specific exercises or may be required to perform several of the exercises determined at random by the judge on the day of competition.

Heel
Following the judges commands, the dog and handler team walks a predetermined pattern with the dog remaining on the handler's left side and reasonably close and attentive to the handler. The dog also must automatically sit when the judge instructs the team to halt. Each sponsoring organization has different requirements for what must be included in this exercise but generally a heeling pattern must include: a left turn, a right turn, an about turn, a fast and slow section, and a halt. Heeling is one of the most basic obedience exercises and as such it is often incorporated into other exercises such as the moving stand and the figure 8. It is also how most teams will enter and move about the ring between exercises.

Figure 8
The figure 8 exercise requires the team to heel in a figure 8 pattern either on or off leash. Generally two of the ring stewards will assist the judge with this exercise by acting as "posts", standing 8 feet apart, that the team walks around to form the loops of the figure 8.

Sit for Exam
This exercise is a modified version of the Stand for Exam. It is generally used in novice level classes and requires the handler to order the dog to sit and then to move away from the dog the length of the leash. The judge will then approach the dog and pet the dog's head.

Sit
There are many variations of this exercise because it is such a common and necessary command for a dog. Generally the handler will order the dog to sit and stay and then the judge will order the handler to walk away from the dog. Depending on the level of the competition the judge will order the handler to: walk around the ring, walk to the other side of the ring and wait for an order to return, or walk out of sight of the dog and wait for an order to return. In the later two cases the length of time before the judge orders the handler to return, and the time the dog must remain sitting, increases depending on the class the team is competing in. This exercise can also be performed in a group where as many as 10 dogs may perform the exercise simultaneously. In any case should a dog break the sit by lying down or getting up to walk around the team will usually fail the exercise and receive a non qualifying score for the class.

Down
Much like the sit exercise the down exercise is common to all levels of competition and has many variations between governing organizations. Like the sit the judge will order the handler to down and leave their dogs. The handler will then order the dog to do this and like the sit will either walk around the ring, walk to the other side of the ring and wait for an order to return, or leave the sight of the dog and wait for an order to return. Just like the sit exercise the later two requirement as well as the length of time that dog is required to remain in the down position changes as the level of competition increases. The dog is also required to remain in the down position for a longer period of time then during the sit exercise. Also, like the sit exercise, this exercise can be performed in a group and should a dog break the down position the team will usually fail the exercise and thus receive a non qualifying score for the class.

Recall
The handler leaves the dog in a sitting position at one side of the ring, walks to the opposite side, and turns to face the dog. On the judge's command, the handler calls or signals the dog to come. The dog must come directly to the handler at a brisk trot or gallop, and sit squarely in front, close enough that the handler can touch the dog's head without bending or stretching, but not between the handler's feet. On the judge's order, the handler commands or signals the dog to "finish". The dog must go briskly to the heel position and sit squarely at heel..

Drop on Recall
The handler leaves the dog as in the Recall exercise. On the judge's command, the handler calls or signals the dog to come. The dog must come directly to the handler at a brisk trot or gallop. While the dog is coming in, the judge signals, and the handler commands or signals the dog to drop (lie down). The dog must immediately assume a completely down position. The dog must hold the position until commanded or signaled to come, then complete the exercise as in the Recall.

Stand For Exam
Following the command of the judge, the handler will stand the dog and leave from heel position. The handler will go a distance of approximately 6 feet and the judge will perform a cursory exam, touching the head, shoulders and hips, and when completed the judge will instruct the handler to return. The handler will return to the dog, going around behind it, and return to heel position. A variation on this exercise is used in advanced classes called the stand for examination. At the end of the heeling pattern instead of ordering the team to halt the judge will order the handler to stand their dog. While moving the handler will give the command and the dog must immediately stop while the handler continues moving to a point about 10 feet away. The judge will then approach and perform a more thorough exam of the dog and at the completion of the exam the dog is instructed to return directly to heel position WITHOUT coming to a front.

Retrieve on the Flat
The handler stands with the dog sitting in heel position facing the open ring. On order from the judge, the handler commands and/or signals the dog to stay, then throws an approved dumbbell at least 20 feet. On the judge's order, the handler commands the dog to fetch. The dog must go straight to the dumbbell at a brisk trot or gallop, retrieve it, return directly to the handler, and sit in front of the handler. The dog must not mouth or play with the dumbbell. Upon order from the judge, the handler gives the release command and takes the dumbbell. The judge then orders the handler to have the dog assume a heeling position.

Retrieve Over High Jump (Open class)
This exercise is the same as the Retrieve on the flat, except that the handler starts by standing at least 8 feet in front of a solid jump that is as high as the dog's shoulder height. The handler throws the dumbbell over the jump. The dog must jump over the jump, retrieve the dumbbell, and return by jumping over the jump again. The remainder of the exercise is the same as the Retrieve on the Flat.

The Broad Jump
In this exercise the dog and handler will set up in heel position at least 8 feet away from the lowest board of the broad jump. On the judge's command the handler will command or signal the dog to stay in a sit, and walk away from the dog to stand facing the right side of the jump, about 2 feet from the side of the jump. The handler's left shoulder is towards the dog. The judge will command "Send your dog". The handler will command or signal the dog to jump over the broad jump. While the dog is in midair, the handler will turn 90 degrees to their right. The dog must clear all panels of the broad jump, perform a 180-degree turn and sit squarely in front of the handler. The judge will then order for the handler to finish the dog.

Directed Retrieve
Three gloves are placed across one side of the ring while the dog and handler face the other direction. Upon the judge's order, the dog and handler pivot together to face the correct glove as indicated by the judge. The dog is sent to retrieve it with a verbal command and hand signal and must retrieve only the indicated glove.

Scent discrimination
The handler presents the judge with an approved set of 5 numbered metal and 5 numbered leather dumbbells referred to as articles. The judge selects one of each, placing them where the handler can reach them, and a ring steward places the rest on the floor or ground approximately 20 feet from the handler, being certain to touch each article. At this point, the dog and handler turn so they are facing away from the articles, and the handler uses his hands to scent either the metal or leather selected articles. The judge takes the scented article without touching it, and places it with the other articles. On the judge's command the handler turns and sends the dog. The dog must go directly to the articles at a brisk trot or gallop, select the article that was scented by the handler, and retrieve it. The exercise is then repeated using the remaining article of the other type.

Directed Jumping
There will be two jumps in the ring that are set 18–20 feet apart. One jump is a High jump while the other is a Bar jump. The exercise consists of two parts. Each part is identical except for use a different jump for each part. The handler will stand centered between the jumps and about twenty feet from them. On the judges command to send the dog, the handler will command and/or signal the dog to go to the other end of the ring about twenty feet past the jumps. Once the dog reaches that point, the handler will call the dog's name and give the command to sit. The dog should quickly turn to face the handler and sit facing them. The judge will then order either "Bar" or "High" jump (it is the judge's decision which jump to use first). The handler will then command and/or signal the dog to return to them over that jump. While the dog is in midair the handler may turn to face the dog. The dog should clear the jump and come sit squarely in front of the handler. The judge will then order the dog to finish and assume the heel position. The exercise is then repeated with the other jump.

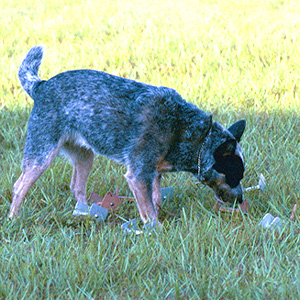
An Australian Cattle Dog finding a scent article as part of obedience competition

For example, in the scent article exercise, the dog searches for a dumbbell that has been scented by the handler and placed within a pile of identical metal and leather dumbbells by an assistant. The dog must find the correct article based only on its unique scent and retrieve it.

== Titles ==
Obedience Titles are awarded through several organizations. In the United States, a purebred dog recognized by the AKC can compete under AKC rules. The AKC also allows dogs registered with its Canine Partners program (mixed-breed dogs) to compete; this became effective April 1, 2010. Dogs can also earn titles in the United Kennel Club (UKC), Mixed Breed Dog Club of America (MBDCA), Service Dogs Of America (SDA), American Mixed Breed Obedience Registry (AMBOR), or Australian Shepherd Club of America (ASCA). When a dog earns a title, an abbreviation is permanently affixed as either a prefix or suffix to the dog's registered name.

The titles given by various organizations do vary, but most are similar to "CD" (Companion Dog), "CDX" (Companion Dog Excellent), "UD" (Utility Dog), "UDX" (Utility Dog Excellent), and "OTCh" (Obedience Trial Champion).

The following explanation applies to AKC competition, but also generally applies to other organizations as well. Information is taken from the AKC Obedience Regulations (amended to January 1. 2012) – see references.

=== Companion Dog title from Novice class ===
The first obedience title is a CD, or "Companion Dog", which is earned through competition in the Novice obedience class. Handlers who have never earned an obedience title or have never owned a dog with a CD title compete in the Novice A division. Handlers who have earned a CD title in the past, or who do not own the dog with whom they are competing participate in the Novice B division.

Novice Class involves six exercises: Heeling on leash and a Figure 8, Stand for Exam, Heel Free (off leash), Recall and Group Exercises: a 1-minute sit stay and a 1-minute down stay with dogs on leash and handlers at the end of the leash. Competitors must qualify (170 out of 200 points) three times under two different judges in order to earn the CD title.

=== Companion Dog Excellent title from Open class ===
The second obedience title is a CDX, or "Companion Dog Excellent", which is earned through competition in the Open obedience class. Competitors are eligible for the Open class after the dog has earned the CD title from the Novice class. The "Open A" division is for competitors who have not earned an OTCh title on any dog, who own the dog, and for dogs who have not yet earned the CDX title. The "Open B" division is for competitors who have earned an OTCh title on any dog, and those dogs who already have earned their CDX title.

Open Class involves seven exercises: Heel Free and a Figure 8 (off leash), a Drop on Recall, Retrieve on Flat, Retrieve over High Jump, Broad Jump, Command Discrimination and Stand, Stay, Get your leash. Competitors must qualify (170 out of 200 points) three times under two different judges in order to earn the CDX title. Dogs with a CDX title may compete in the Open B division indefinitely.

=== Utility Dog title from Utility class ===
The third obedience title is a UD, or "Utility Dog", which is earned through competition in the Utility obedience class. Competitors enter the Utility Classes after completing their CDX in the Open class. Teams may enter the "Utility A" division if the handler owns the dog, has never earned an OTCh title on any dog, and does not already have a UD title on the dog with whom they are competing. The "Utility B" division is for competitors who have earned an OTCh title on any dog, and those dogs who already have earned their UD title.

Utility Class involves six exercises:

1st Exercise is called the Signal Exercise. The handler must give a signal (non-verbal) to the dog "to heel" as the judge gives a heeling pattern. At the end of the heeling pattern, the handler will be asked to "stand your dog, leave". The handler walks across the ring and at the judge's signal, the handler gives a signal for the dog "to down", "to sit", and "to come"; followed with "finish".

2nd and 3rd Exercises are called Scent Discrimination. A dog must retrieve a scented (handler's) metal and leather article. These are two separate exercises. The dog must be able to distinguish between the handler's scent and that of a person who has placed 8 other articles in a cluster approximately 20 feet away.

4th Exercise is the Directed Retrieve. Three gloves are placed approximately 15–20 feet away from the handler and dog. The handler must turn and face the glove that the judge has indicated and send the dog to retrieve it.

5th Exercise is The Moving Stand. The dog must heel with the handler and then is stopped in standing position. The handler must continue moving (10 feet) and turn around to face the dog. The judge "examines" the dog and instructs the handler "call your dog to heel position".

6th Exercise is Directed Jumping. It is often referred to as "go outs". The dog and handler are centered at one end of the ring. The dog is sent out and required to turn and sit approximately 20 feet beyond the high jump and bar jump. The dog is given a signal and verbal command to jump a high jump and in the second half of the exercise the dog is sent out again and must execute the other jump. It is scored as one exercise.

Competitors must qualify (170 out of 200 points) three times under two different judges in order to earn the UD title. Dogs with a UD title may compete in the Utility B division indefinitely.

=== Utility Dog Excellent title ===
To earn the UDX, or "Utility Dog Excellent" title, a dog-and-handler team must qualify (earn 170 out of 200 points) in both the Open B and the Utility B class at a single trial to earn a leg towards the title. In most cases this effectively requires the team to qualify in both Open B and Utility B on the same day. In order to earn the title the team must do this a total of 10 times.

=== Obedience Trial Champion (OTCh) title ===
The American Kennel Club (AKC) awards an "Obedience Trial Championship" (OTCh) to the dog-and-handler team that defeats a large number of other teams in competition. The team must earn a total of 100 points, based on a rating scale distributed by the AKC. The points can only be earned by competing in either an Open B or a Utility B class. In addition, points are only awarded to dogs that placed in the top four and the number of points awarded to each dog varies depending on the size of the class. For example, a team that placed first out of 15 may only earn 4 OTCh points but a team that places first out of 50 may earn as much as 40 points. In addition to the points a team must win three first place awards – one in an Open B class, one in a Utility B class, and an additional first place win in either Open B or Utility B all under different judges.

Since a team begins accruing OTCh points by competing in any Open B or Utility B class after completing the Utility Dog title, it is possible (though not common) for a dog to earn the OTCh title before completing the Utility Dog Excellent title.

== See also ==
- Championship (dog)
- Dog sports
- Obedience training
- World Show
