= Conformation (dog) =

Dog appearances, by breed

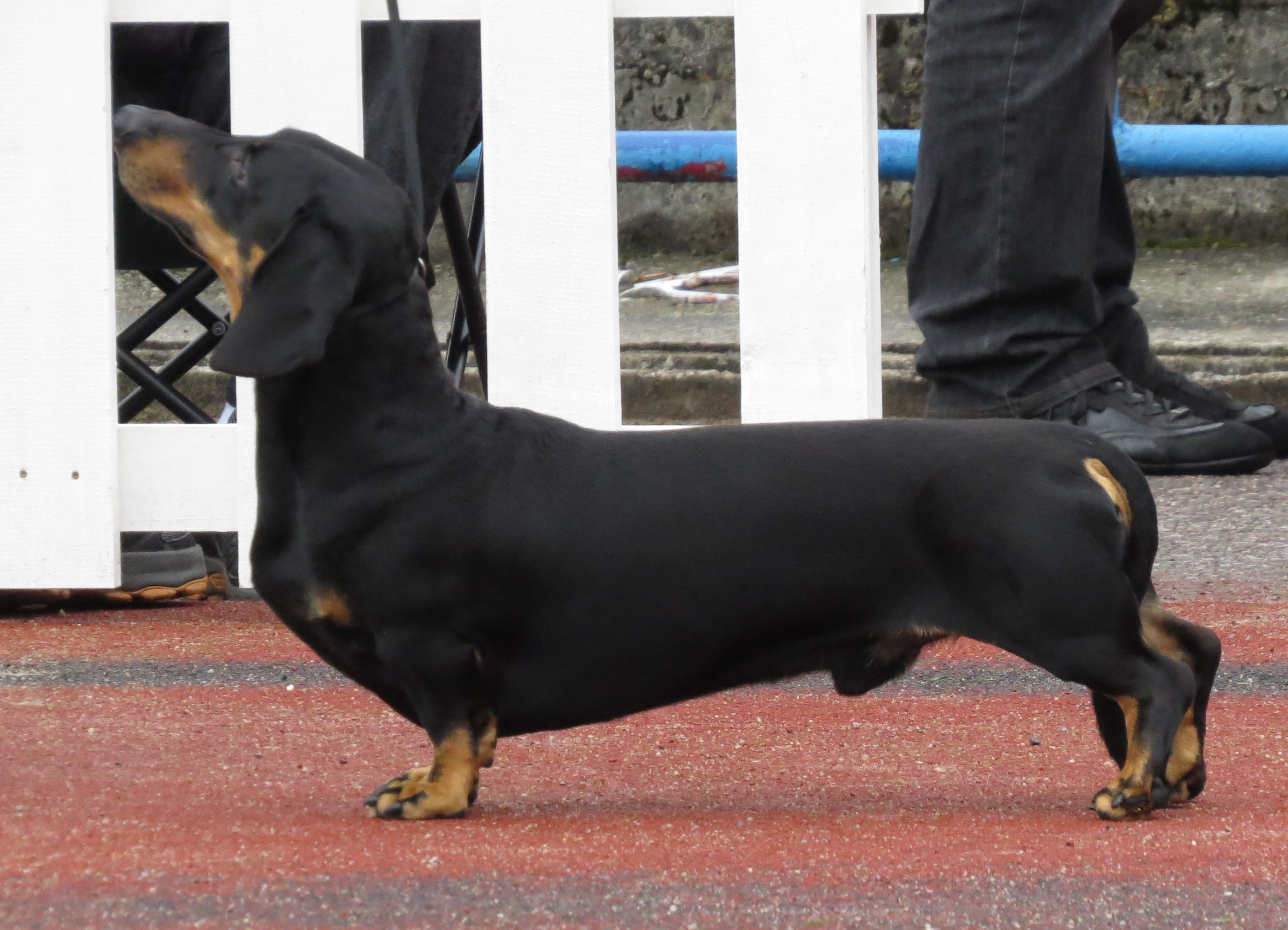

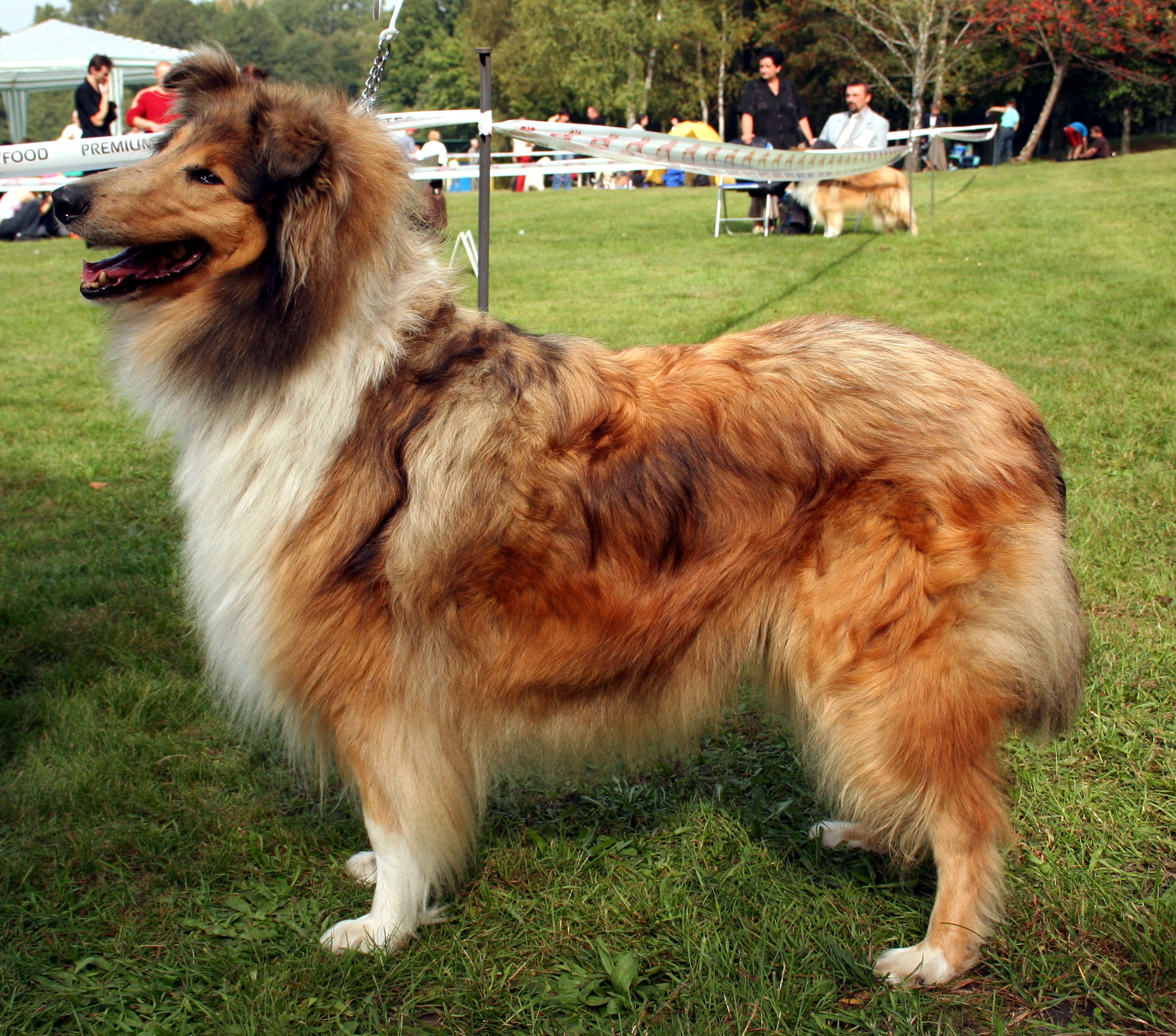
A Dachshund (top) and Rough Collie (bottom) at dog shows. Both fit their breed's conformation standard, but exhibit vast differences from each other

Conformation in dogs refers solely to the externally visible details of a dog's structure and appearance, as defined in detail by each dog breed's written breed standard. A dog that conforms to most of the items of description in its individual breed standard is said to have good conformation. Unlike equine conformation, there are no fixed rules for dog conformation, as dogs are the most variable in appearance of any animals. Instead, conformation in dogs is based on the dog type from which the breed developed, along with many details that have been added to the breed standard for purposes of differentiation from other breeds, for working reasons, or for enhancing the beauty of the animals from the viewpoint of the fanciers who wrote the breed standards.

== Breed standards ==
The breed standard for each breed of dog details desirable and undesirable attributes of appearance and temperament for an individual breed. Due to the great variability in dogs, there is no one standard of good conformation. What is good conformation for a lapdog will not be good conformation for a guard dog; good leg structure for a dog that must travel long distances will not be the same as good leg structure for dogs whose conformation requires short bursts of speed.

Breed standards are designed solely to describe the breed's history and purpose, temperament, and appearance. The breed standard is not a checkbox list of requirements, but rather a description, giving a detailed "word picture" of an idealized dog of that breed. Requirements for documentation, genetic testing, health testing, testing for particular styles of work or fitness for particular dog sports or requirements for training are beyond the scope of a breed standard, and are instead developed as breeder guidelines by breed clubs, kennel clubs, or even by national agricultural department rules. Conformation refers solely to the externally visible details of a dog's structure and appearance, along with the dog's expected temperament, which varies for each breed or type of dog.

== See also ==
- Canine terminology
- List of dog breeds
- Breed Groups (dog)
- Breed type
- Dog anatomy
- Fault (dog)
