= Ridsdale =

Ridsdale is a surname. Notable people with the surname include:

- Aurelian Ridsdale (1864–1923), British Liberal politician
- Charles Ridsdale (1873–1952), Anglican bishop
- George Ridsdale (1878–?), English footballer
- Gerald Ridsdale (1934–2025), convicted child molester and Catholic priest
- J Ridsdale, English footballer
- Julian Ridsdale (1915–2004), British National Liberal and later Conservative Party politician
- Leone Ridsdale, English neurologist
- Paddy Ridsdale (1921–2009), Ian Fleming's secretary during World War II
- Peter Ridsdale (born 1952), English businessman
- Philip Ridsdale (1915–2000), Anglican bishop
- Robert Ridsdale (1783–1857), English race horse breeder
- Septimus Ridsdale (1840–1884), English cricketer

Ridsdale is also the name of a village in Corsenside, and an old spelling of Redesdale, both in Northumberland, England.
