= Old Hemp =

Border Collie (1893–1901)

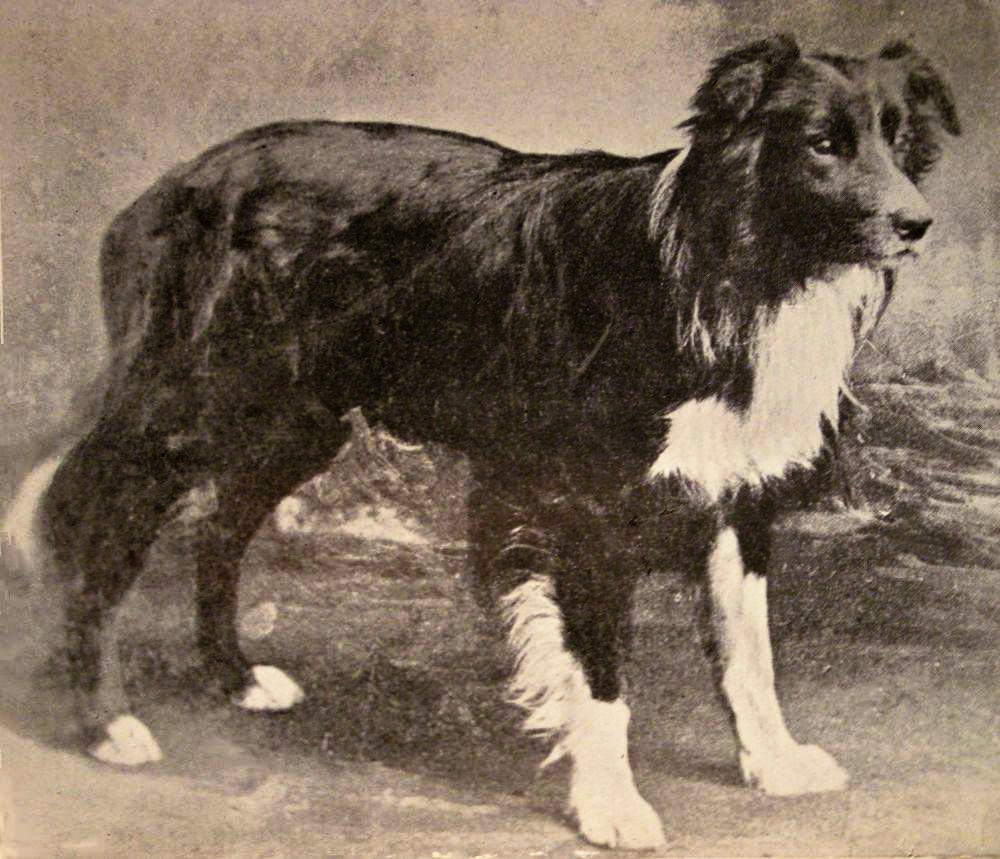
- Other name: Hemp
- Species: Canis familiaris
- Breed: Border Collie
- Sex: Male
- Born: September 1893
- Died: May 1901
- Nationality: English
- Occupation: Working dog
- Known for: Progenitor of the Border Collie
- Successor: Herdsman's Tommy
- Owner: Adam Telfer
- Parents: Roy (sire); Meg (dam)
- Offspring: Old Kep
- Weight: 45 lb (20 kg)
- Height: 21 in (53 cm)

Old Hemp (1 September 1893 – May 1901) was a stud dog considered to be the progenitor to the Border Collie breed. He was owned by Adam Telfer, and was used as a working dog to herd sheep. His style was different from that commonly seen during his era, as he worked far more quietly than the other sheepdogs of the time. This style was adopted and used by other breeders and trainers, and became the most common style among Border Collies within a few generations, with his descendants becoming successful international sheepdog champions.

== Life and herding career ==
In September 1893, Old Hemp was born to Adam Telfer's two dogs in West Woodburn, Northumberland. Hemp's mother, Meg, was a reticent and very strong-eyed black sheepdog; while Hemp's father, Roy, was a loose-eyed black, white, and tan sheepdog with a good natured temperament. Unlike many modern border collies, Hemp was a tri-colored dog with only a small amount of white fur on his trim.

First following sheep at the age of six weeks, Hemp grew to have a great ability to herd. He moved sheep quietly unlike the louder sheepdogs of the era and was far more mild-mannered, although sometimes worked so intensely that he physically trembled; within a few generations, his style had been adopted by almost all Border Collies, and became known as the Border Collie style.

Hemp never ceased to impress his owner Adam Telfer. Telfer once said, while talking about Hemp, "he flashed like a meteor across the sheepdog horizon. There never was such an outstanding personality." With that, Telfer continued Hemp's legacy within his own breeding stock. Author and commentator Eric Halsall was also impressed by his skill. Halsall once said about Hemp, "none who saw him ever forgot him ... Almost faultless in work ... he was born with such knowledge of his craft that he never required training and went to his work naturally."

== Legacy ==
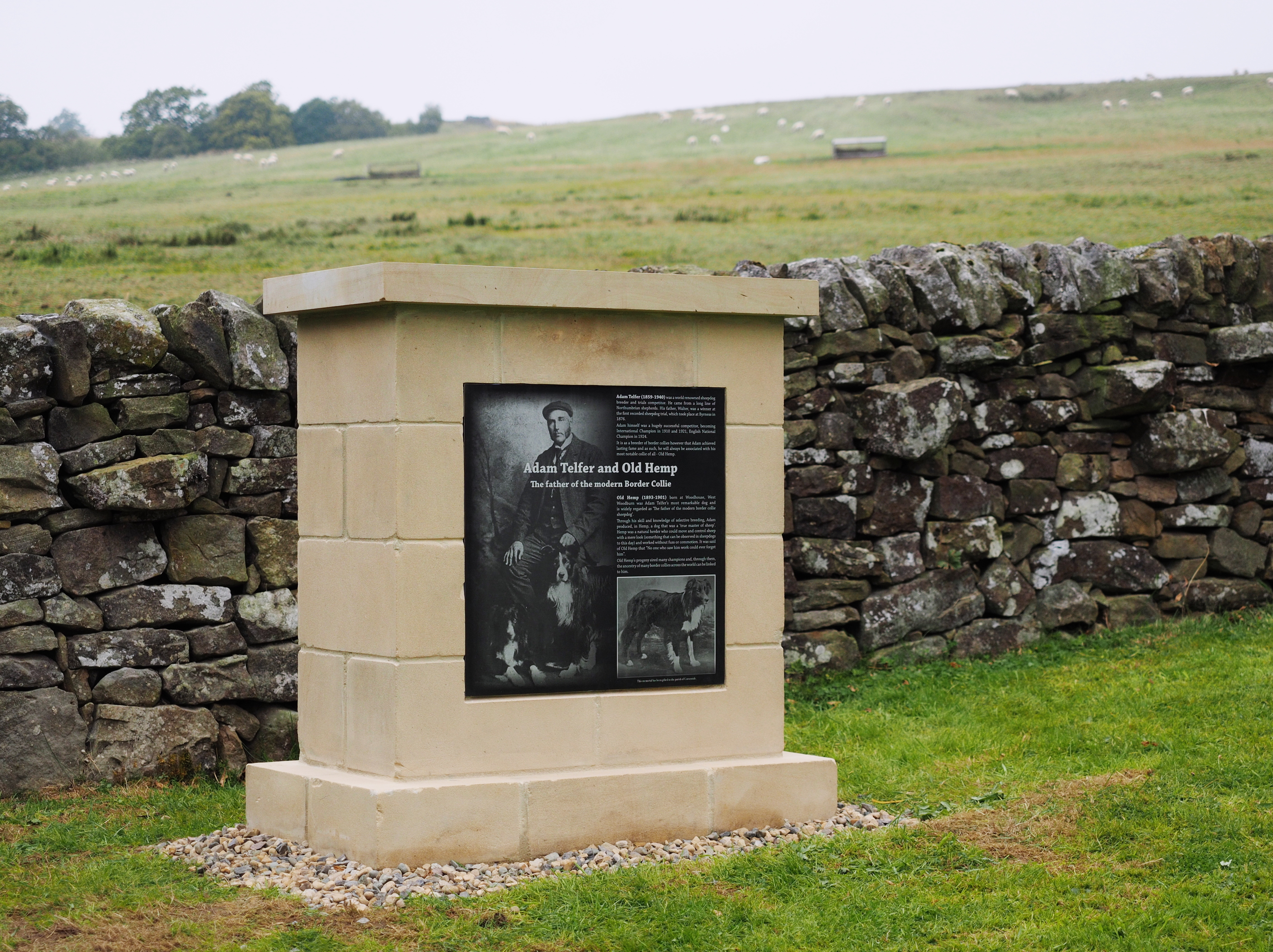
Memorial at West Woodburn, Northumberland, in northern England.

Hemp is considered the foundation sire or "father" of the Border Collie breed. The International Sheepdog society began its stud book in 1915, with Old Hemp being the ninth entry out of around 300,000. Old Hemp's ability to herd sheep was what attracted many dog handlers. Estimates place his offspring at more than 200, due to his stud services being widely sought after. His medium-sized stature and rough coat are commonly seen in the breed today, as many of his offspring continued to keep many of his original traits.

While it is not known if Hemp participated in any sheepdog trials, a dog from Telfer's own breeding stock, Sweep (a grandson of Hemp), won the International Sheep Dog Society's championship twice. Telfer later bred and owned another dog named Hemp, a descendant of Old Hemp. The younger Hemp won the 1924 International Farmers Championship for sheepdogs. This was not the only victory in that competition by Old Hemp's descendants. Each of the twenty-nine collies that won the championship between 1906 and 1951 were descendants of Old Hemp.

A Facebook campaign was started in 2012 to install a memorial to Telfer and Old Hemp in West Woodburn, and permission was granted by the relevant authorities. The unveiling of the memorial took place on September 8, 2015, and was attended by a large assembly of Border Collie owners with their dogs.

== See also ==
- List of individual dogs
