= One Man and His Dog =

- Country of origin: United Kingdom
- Original language: English

Production
- Running time: 30–60 minutes

Original release
- Network: BBC Two (1976–2012); BBC One (2013–2023)
- Release: 17 February 1976 – 17 September 2023

Related
- A Dog's Show; Countryfile; Flockstars

One Man and His Dog is a BBC television series in the United Kingdom featuring sheepdog trials, originally presented by Phil Drabble, with commentary by Eric Halsall and, later, by Ray Ollerenshaw. It was first aired on 17 February 1976 and from 2013 as a special annual edition of Countryfile. In 1994, Robin Page replaced Drabble as the main presenter. Gus Dermody took over as commentator until 2012.

At its peak, in the early 1980s, it attracted audiences in excess of eight million.

== History ==
The last regular series aired in 1999 on BBC Two; however, the same year also saw the first of a series of Christmas specials, which continued annually until 2011 and were contested by teams of shepherds from the four nations of England, Scotland, Wales and Ireland, in the three categories of Single, Brace and Young Handlers. The main hosts have been Clarissa Dickson Wright, followed by Ben Fogle (initially with co-host Shauna Lowry), and Kate Humble.

Matt Baker joined the programme as a co-commentator (alongside Dermody) in 2006, and additionally became the main host in 2011. In 2012, the show was broadcast in two parts (the first of which was shown live) in September, and Baker was joined as a main presenter by Michaela Strachan. Dermody remained as a commentator until 2012.

The BBC has continued to broadcast sheepdog trials in a standalone series on BBC Alba – the programme Farpaisean Chon-Chaorach has covered the Scottish National Sheep Dog Trial, International Sheep Dog Trial and triennial World Trial in its 13 series since 2008.

=== Cancellation and merger with Countryfile ===
In July 2013, it was announced that One Man and His Dog was to cease being a programme in its own right, but the competition would become part of the rural affairs show Countryfile on BBC One.

The first broadcast within Countryfile was on 27 October 2013, presented by Baker (who also continued as co-commentator) and Julia Bradbury. The Brace round was discontinued. Dermody was credited in 2013 as a consultant to the programme, but was no longer one of the commentators (replaced by Andy Jackman). For the 2014 competition, broadcast within the 28 September edition of Countryfile, Baker co-presented with Helen Skelton. The 2015 competition was broadcast on 27 September 2015 and presented by Baker and Ellie Harrison. The 2017 competition, presented by Baker and Charlotte Smith, was broadcast on 24 September 2017, and saw the reinstatement of the Brace round.

Comedians Tim Vine and Kiri Pritchard-McLean competed in a special celebrity version entitled One Red Nose and Their Dog. Training footage featured in Countryfile on 6 March 2022, with the competition broadcast on Comic Relief night (18 March 2022).

The competition was held at Goodwood in 2023, presented by Adam Henson.

== Presenters and commentators ==
- Phil Drabble (1976–1993)
- Eric Halsall (1976–1990)
- Ray Ollerenshaw (1991–1993)
- Robin Page (1994–2000)
- Gus Dermody (1994–1999, 2007–2012)
- Clarissa Dickson-Wright (2000–2002)
- Ben Fogle (2002–2007)
- Shauna Lowry (2002–2006)
- Matt Baker (2006–2022)
- Kate Humble (2008–2011)
- Michaela Strachan (2012)
- Julia Bradbury (2013)
- Andy Jackman (2013–2023)
- Helen Skelton (2014, 2019, 2021)
- Ellie Harrison (2015)
- Anita Rani (2016, 2018)
- Charlotte Smith (2017, 2020)
- Adam Henson (2023)

== Transmissions ==
=== Main series ===
Series	Start date	End date	Episodes
1	17 February 1976	6 April 1976	8
2	1 October 1976	19 November 1976	8
3	12 January 1977	2 March 1977	8
4	29 December 1977	16 February 1978	8
5	16 October 1978	27 October 1978	8
6	13 January 1979	24 February 1979	7
7	17 April 1980	29 May 1980	7
8	3 March 1981	21 April 1981	8
9	2 February 1982	23 March 1982	8
10	19 January 1983	9 March 1983	8
11	8 May 1984	3 July 1984	8
12	10 May 1985	5 July 1985	8
13	21 February 1986	18 April 1986	8
14	10 February 1987	31 March 1987	8
15	1 March 1988	19 April 1988	8
16	25 June 1989	20 August 1989	8
17	15 July 1990	2 September 1990	8
18	14 July 1991	1 September 1991	8
19	16 August 1992	4 October 1992	8
20	31 October 1993	12 December 1993	7
21	25 September 1994	13 November 1994	8
22	11 November 1995	13 January 1996	8
23	27 September 1996	15 November 1996	8
24	3 January 1998	21 February 1998	8
25	2 January 1999	13 March 1999	11

=== Specials ===
Date	Entitle
27 December 1999	
29 December 2000	
29 December 2001	
28 December 2002	
27 December 2003	
18 December 2004	The Heats
19 December 2004	The Final
17 December 2005	The Heats
17 December 2005	The Final
16 December 2006	The Heats
17 December 2006	The Final
22 December 2007	
7 December 2008	
14 December 2008	

=== Seasonal series ===
Series	Start date	End date	Episodes
1	15 December 2009	18 December 2009	4
2	18 December 2010	19 December 2010	2
3	10 December 2011	17 December 2011	2
4	15 September 2012	22 September 2012	2
