= Eric Halsall =

British television presenter (1920–1996)

- Born: 18 March 1920; Burnley, Lancashire, England
- Died: 21 October 1996 (aged 76); Burnley, Lancashire, England
- Occupations: Author, television presenter

Eric Halsall (18 March 1920 – 21 October 1996) was an English countryman, author and television presenter. He was best known for his fourteen-year run as a commentator on BBC TV series One Man and His Dog.

== Early life ==
Halsall was born and brought up in Burnley, Lancashire, attending Burnley Grammar School. He was a keen footballer and had a trial at Burnley F.C. Turned down by the RAF, he joined the Burnley Express, initially in advertising and then as a writer. He married Rita Greenwood in 1942.

== Career ==
Halsall worked from the 1950s until 1985 as a farms manager for the National Coal Board. However, he was best known as the presenter of the long-running TV series One Man and His Dog, in which he commentated on sheepdog trials for 14 years from 1975 to 1989. He was also the course director for the series, in charge of laying out the trial fields.

Halsall was for 21 years a director of the International Sheep Dog Society and was a winner of its Wilkinson Sword Trophy Award.

== Later life ==
Halsall lived in the Cliviger area, close to Burnley. He was president of the Burnley branch of the Guide Dogs for the Blind Association.

== Bibliography ==
- Hill dog (1961)
- Meg of Lonktop (1968)
- Sheepdogs My Faithful Friends (1980) ISBN 0-7207-0299-2
- Sheepdog trials (1982) ISBN 0-85059-565-7
- Gael: sheepdog of the hills (1985) ISBN 0-85059-676-9
- The history and specification of the organ in the Tenants Hall, Tatton Park, Knutsford, Cheshire (1985)
- Moorland Sovereigns: History of the Lonk Breed of Sheep (1996) ISBN 1-873953-27-5
