= New Zealand Heading Dog =

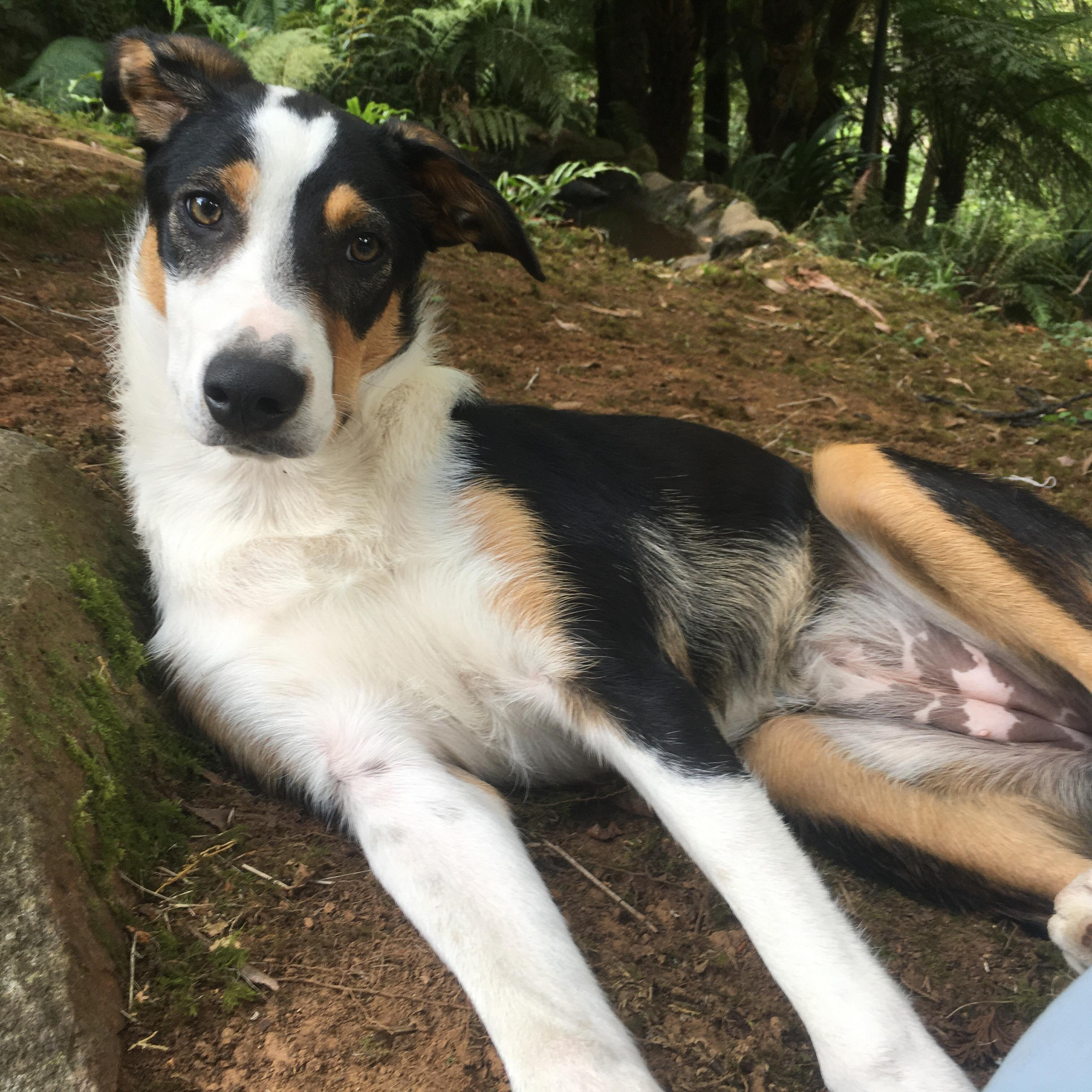
- Other names: New Zealand Heading Dog; New Zealand Eye Dog
- Origin: New Zealand
- Breed status: Not recognised as a breed by any major kennel club.
Traits
- Coat: smooth
- Colour: black, white, tan

The New Zealand Heading Dog is a New Zealand breed of working and herding dog derived from the Border Collie. The dogs are sturdy, long-legged and even-haired, and use their visual prowess, intelligence and quick movement to control sheep. They are generally black and white in colour, but may also be tan.

== History ==
The New Zealand Heading Dog is descended from the Border Collie, a breed of dog originally from the Scottish border. Early settlers brought these dogs to New Zealand to herd sheep, then went on to breed more specified dogs. Due to the Border Collie's long hair, they were bred with shorter haired dogs to create a breed that was better suited to the hot summers of the local environment. They were also bred to have less of an instinct to lie down than a Border Collie, standing still on their feet to make them more visible to the shepherd at long distance in the native tussock, and to run longer distances, and in some lines to be larger and more "hard nosed" to deal more easily with cattle.

The New Zealand Heading Dog has since been an integral part of sheepdog trials, which began in New Zealand as early as 1867 in Wānaka. The competitive dog sport involves herding sheep around a field and into enclosures.

The Heading Dog is the fourth most common breed of dog in New Zealand.

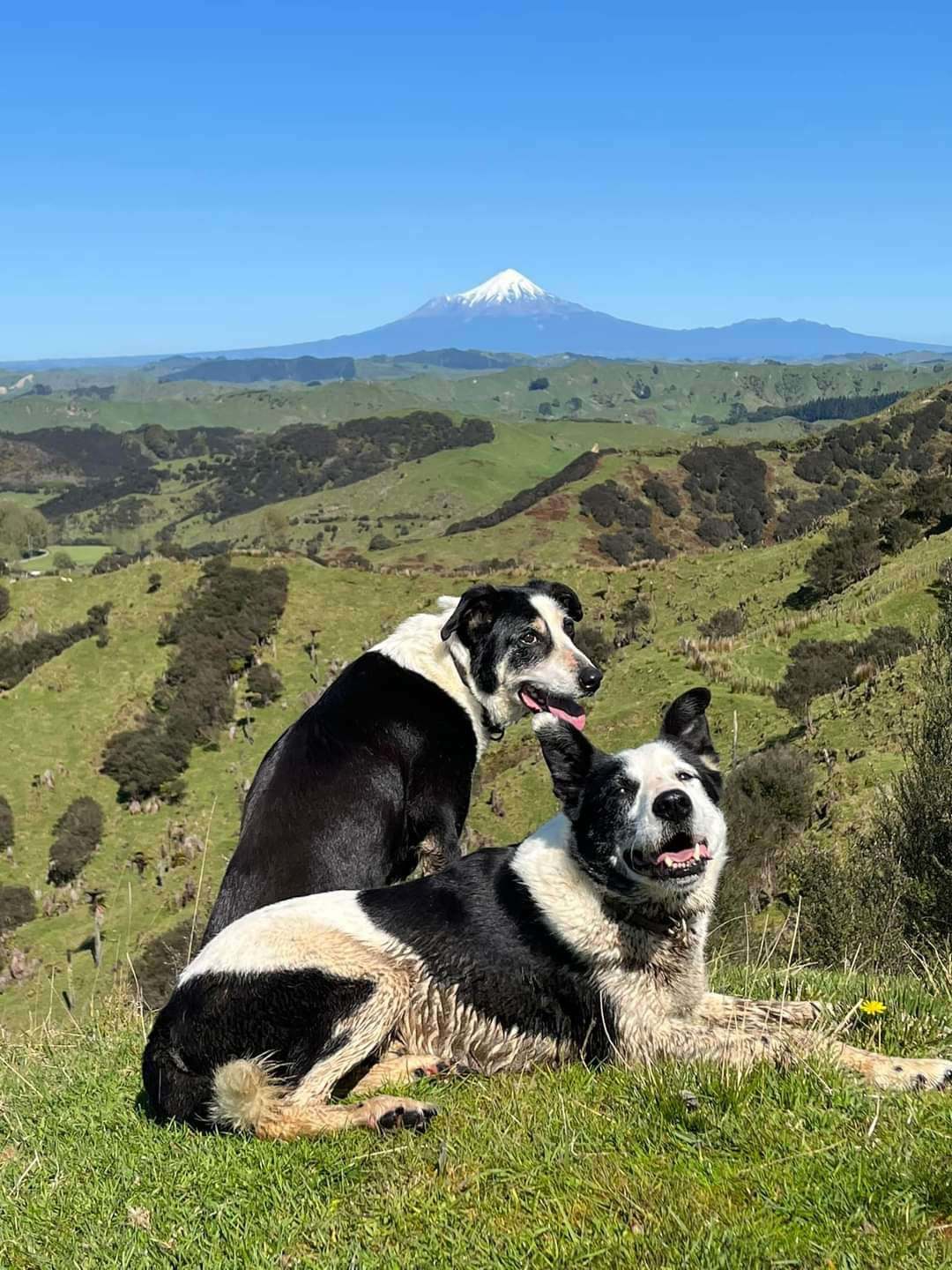
Two New Zealand Heading dogs in eastern Taranaki

== Description ==
New Zealand Heading Dogs are very aware of their surroundings and are able to adapt to quick movements that are in their line of sight, suiting their shepherding requirements, and are able to run long distances day after day. These types of dogs are specifically bred and trained to work in farms to circle sheep and cattle. They work with a strong eye, barking and nipping is discouraged in trials, but some will when more pressure is needed. They are medium to large dogs with smooth, straight hair. New Zealand Heading Dogs are often black and white, the black colour often making a mask like shape on the head, but some may be tan or other colours. The breed requires an agrarian environment and are generally not intended to be kept as house pets. New Zealand Heading Dogs are extremely intelligent, active dogs with instinct to herd animals; if left alone for too long, they may try to escape and/or herd small animals or children.
