= Border Collie =

Working dog breed

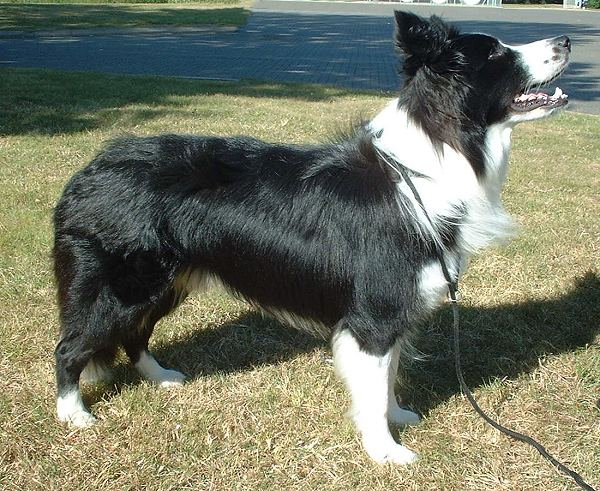
- Origin: Anglo-Scottish border
Traits
Height	Males	48–60 cm (19–24 in)
	Females	46–56 cm (18–22 in)
Weight	Males	14–25 kg (31–55 lb)
	Females	12–19 kg (26–42 lb)
- Coat: smooth or rough, double coat
- Colour: any; black-and-white and black tricolour (black, tan, white) most common
Kennel club standards
- KC: standard
- Fédération Cynologique Internationale: standard

The Border Collie is a breed of British herding dog of the collie type of medium size. It originates in the region of the Anglo-Scottish border, and descends from the traditional sheepdogs once found all over the British Isles. It is kept predominantly as a sheep-herding dog or as a companion animal. It competes with success in sheepdog trials. Some have claimed that it is the most intelligent breed of dog.

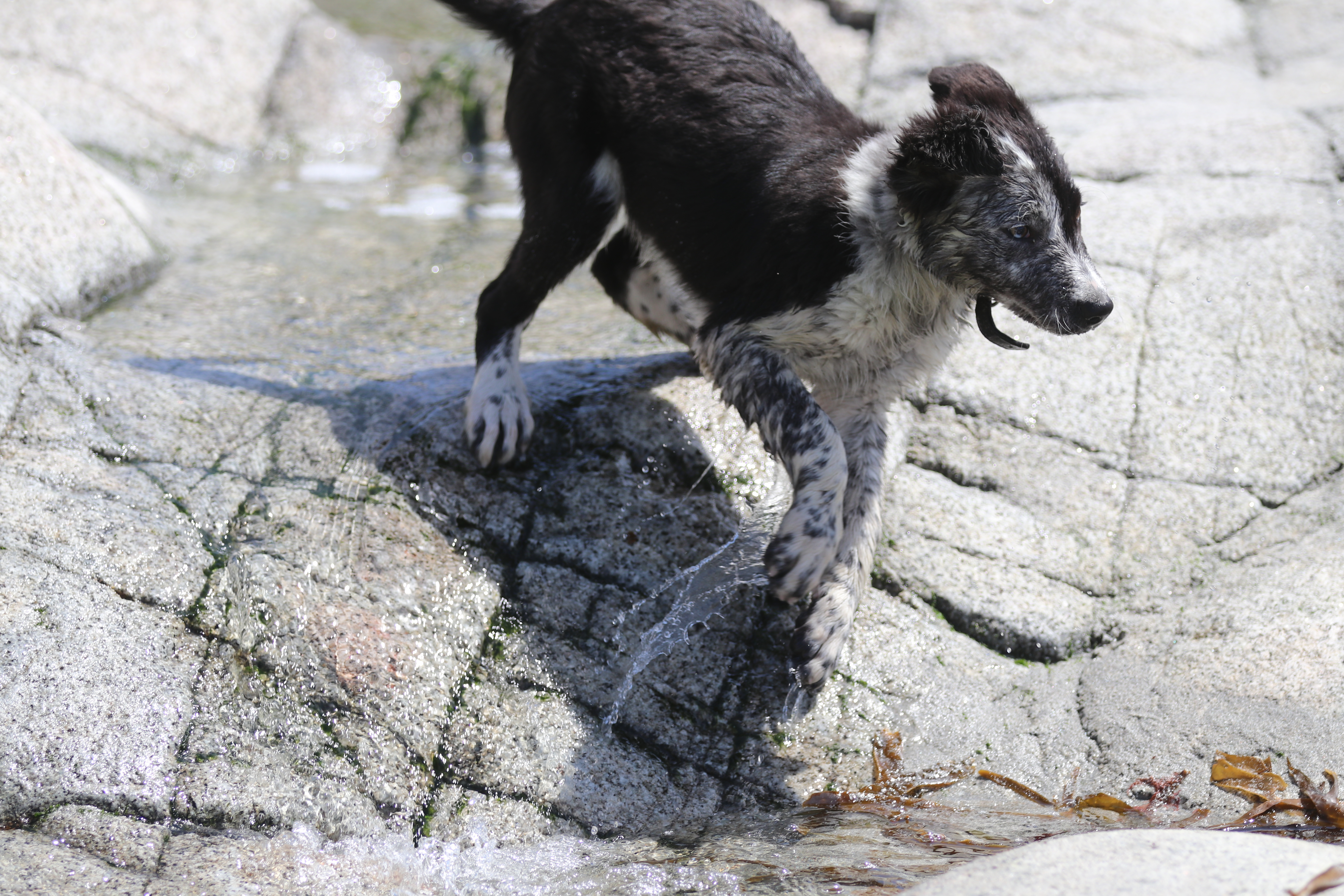
Border Collie puppy playing in water

== Etymology ==
The Border Collie is descended from landrace collies, a type found widely in the British Isles. The name for the breed came from its probable place of origin along the Anglo-Scottish border. Mention of the "collie" or "Colley" type first appeared toward the end of the 19th century, although the word "collie" is older than this and has its origin in the Scots language.

Combe preferred the idea that the word 'collie' comes from an old Celtic language word for useful, although she did recognize that Onions' etymological work superseded.

== History ==
In a study done by Grant on a hillfort named Danebury, today's collie is mentioned as a comparator for dogs of the type used by Celtic herders.

Many Border Collies today can be traced back to a dog known as Old Hemp. In 1915, James Reid, Secretary of the International Sheep Dog Society (ISDS) in the United Kingdom first used the term "border collie" to distinguish those dogs registered by the ISDS from the Kennel Club's collie (or Scotch Collie, including the Rough Collie and Smooth Collie) which originally came from the same working stock but had developed a different, standardised appearance following introduction to the show ring in 1860 and mixture with different breeds.

=== Old Hemp ===
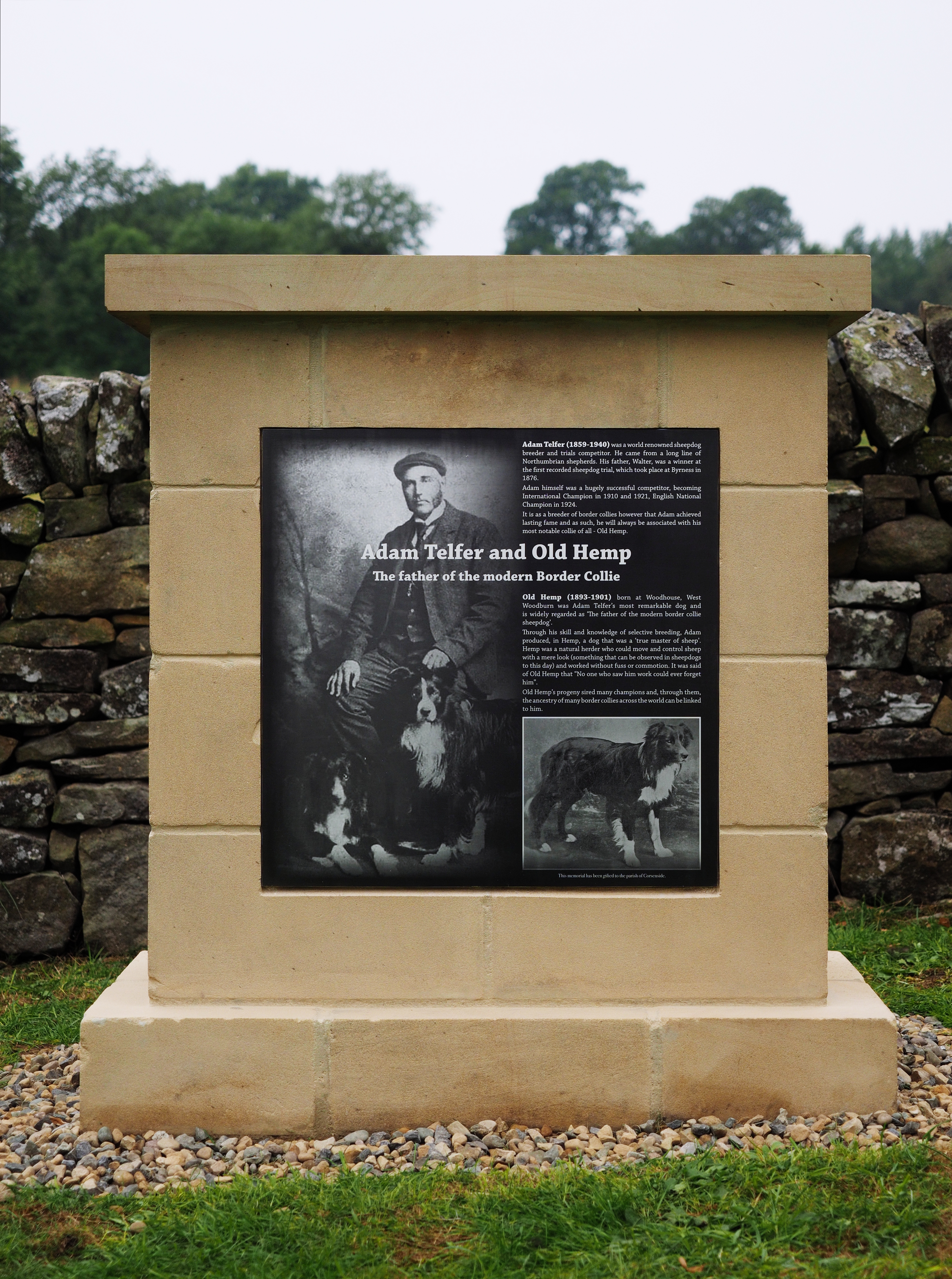
Old Hemp Memorial at West Woodburn, Northumberland

Old Hemp, a tricolour dog, was born in Northumberland, England in September 1893 and died in May 1901. He was bred by Adam Telfer from Roy, a black and tan dog, and Meg, a black-coated, strong-eyed dog. Hemp was a quiet, powerful dog to which sheep responded easily. Many shepherds used him for stud and Hemp's working style became the Border Collie style. All purebred Border Collies alive today can trace an ancestral line back to Old Hemp. He was believed to have sired as many as 200 pups over the span of his life.

=== Wiston Cap ===
Wiston Cap (b. 28 September 1963) is the dog that the International Sheep Dog Society (ISDS) badge portrays in the characteristic Border Collie herding pose. He was a popular stud dog in the history of the breed, and his bloodline can be seen in most bloodlines of the modern-day collie. Bred by W. S. Hetherington and trained and handled by John Richardson, Cap was a biddable and good-natured dog. His bloodlines all trace back to the early registered dogs of the studbook, and to J. M. Wilson's Cap, whose name occurs 16 times within seven generations in his pedigree. Wiston Cap sired three Supreme Champions and is grand-sire of three others, one of whom was E. W. Edwards' Bill, who won the championship twice.

=== Introduction to New Zealand and Australia ===
Collies were listed as imports to New Zealand as early as 1858, but the type was not specified. In the late 1890s James Lilico (1861?–1945) of Christchurch, New Zealand, imported a number of working dogs from the United Kingdom. These included Hindhope Jed, a black, tan and white born in Hindhope, Scotland in 1895, as well as Maudie, Moss of Ancrum, Ness and Old Bob.

It is unclear whether Hindhope Jed was a descendant of Old Hemp. Born two years after him, she is mentioned in a British Hunts and Huntsmen article concerning John Elliot of Jedburgh:

Mr Elliot himself is well known for his breed of collies. His father supplied Noble to the late Queen Victoria and it was from our subject that the McLeod got Hindhope Jed, now the champion of New Zealand and Australia.

On her departure to New Zealand, Hindhope Jed was already in pup to Captain, another of the then-new "border" strain. Hindhope Jed had won three trials in her native Scotland, and was considered to be the "best to cross the equator".

In 1901 the King and Mcleod stud was created by Charles Beechworth King (b. 1855, Murrumbidgee, NSW), his brother and Alec McLeod at Canonbar, near Nyngan (north-west of Sydney), brought Hindhope Jed to Australia, where she enjoyed considerable success at sheepdog trials.

The New Zealand Heading Dog breed was developed from Border Collies.

== Description ==
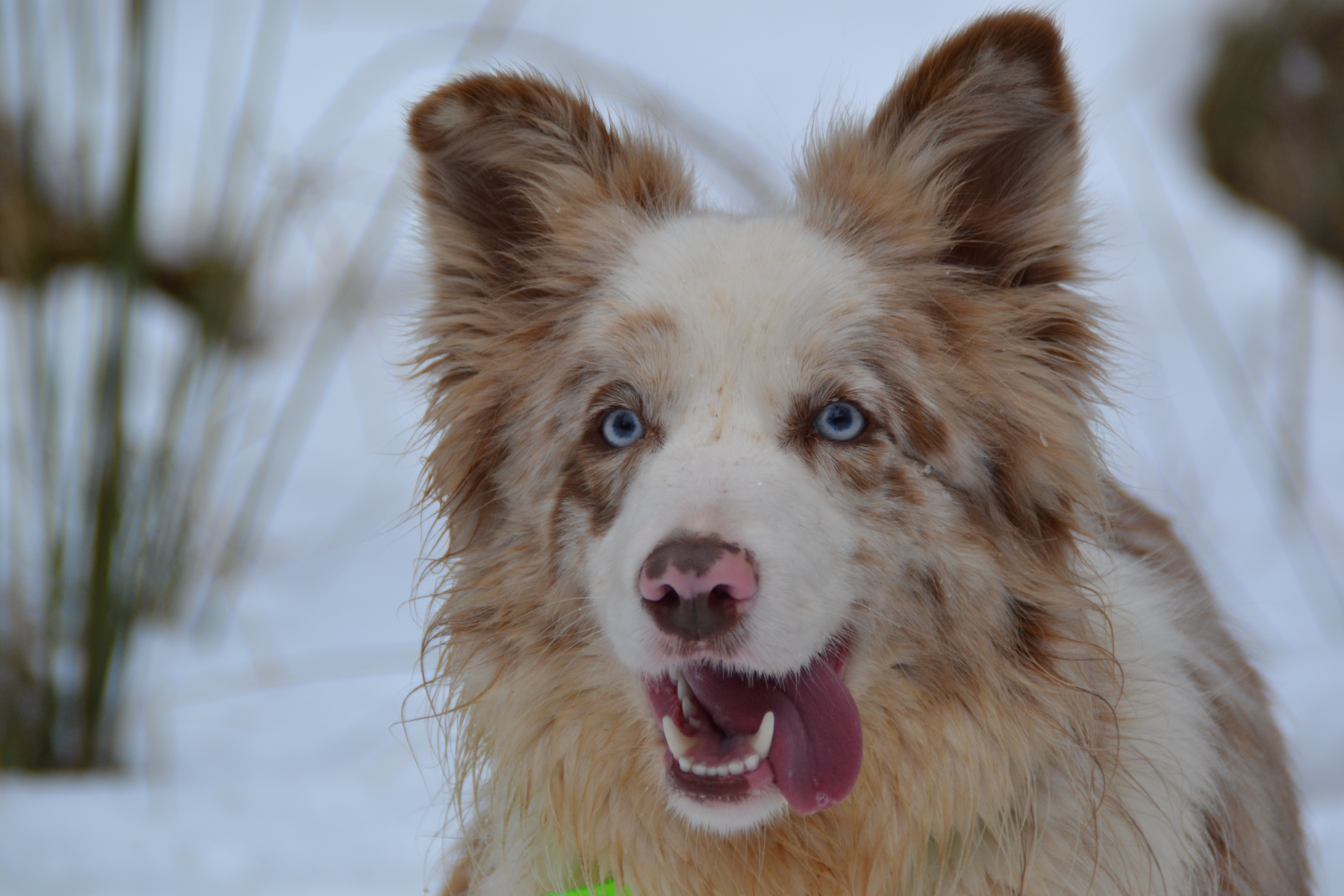
Red merle Border Collie. Female.

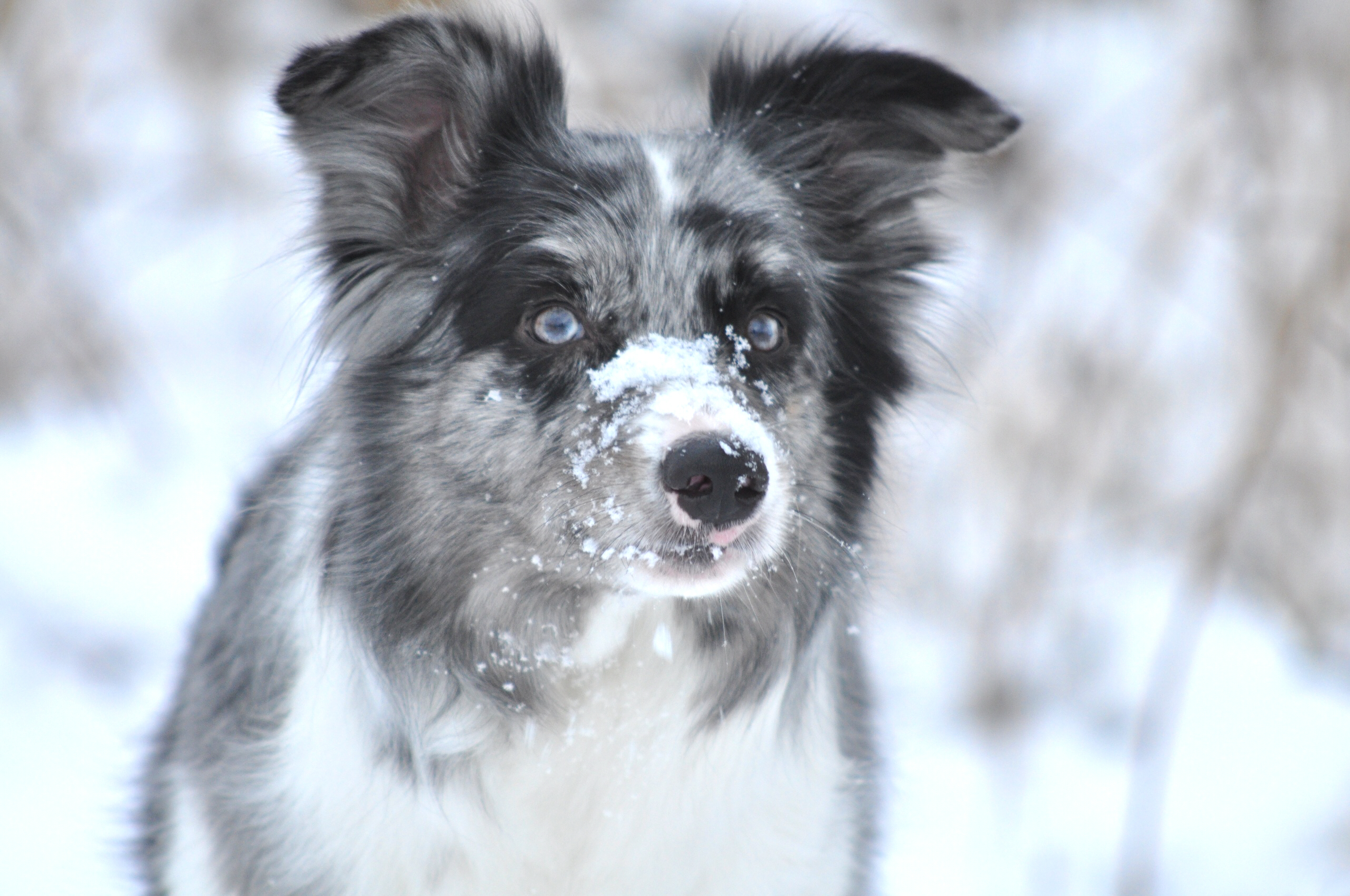
Blue merle Border Collie. Female.

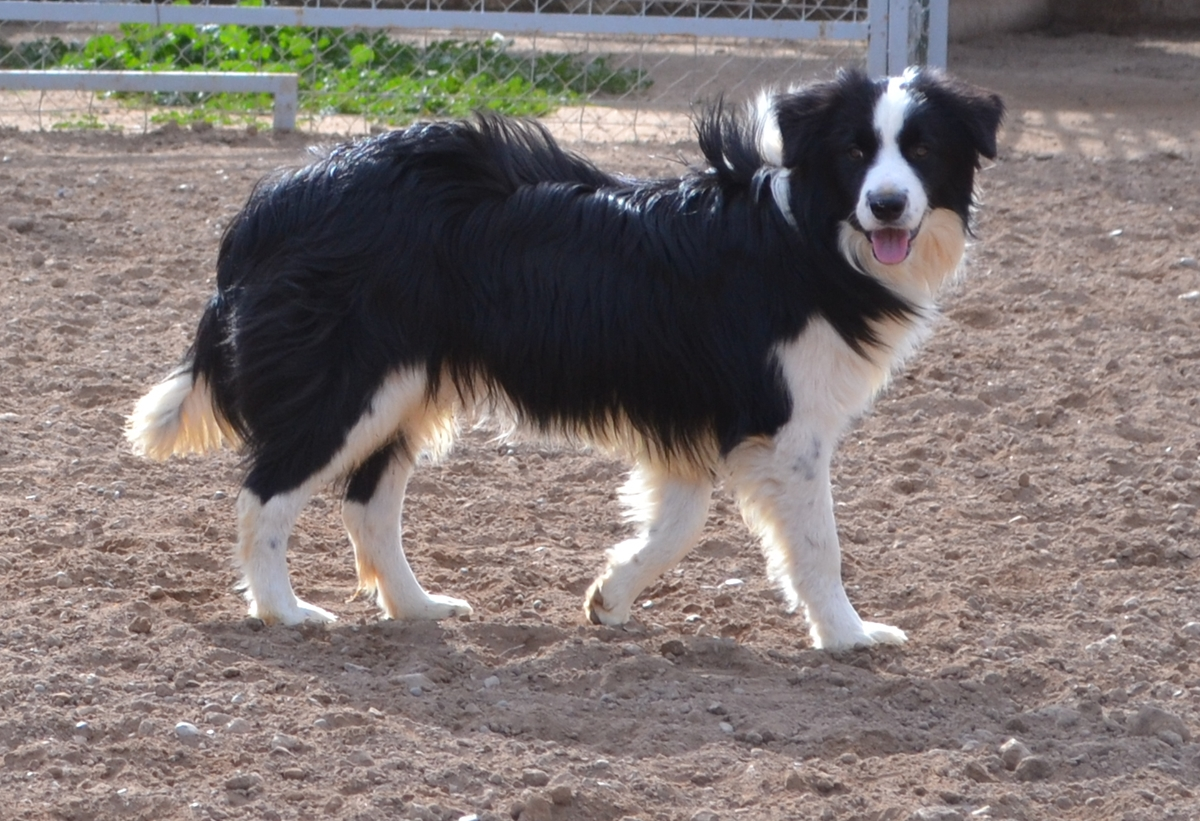
Black & white Border Collie. Male.

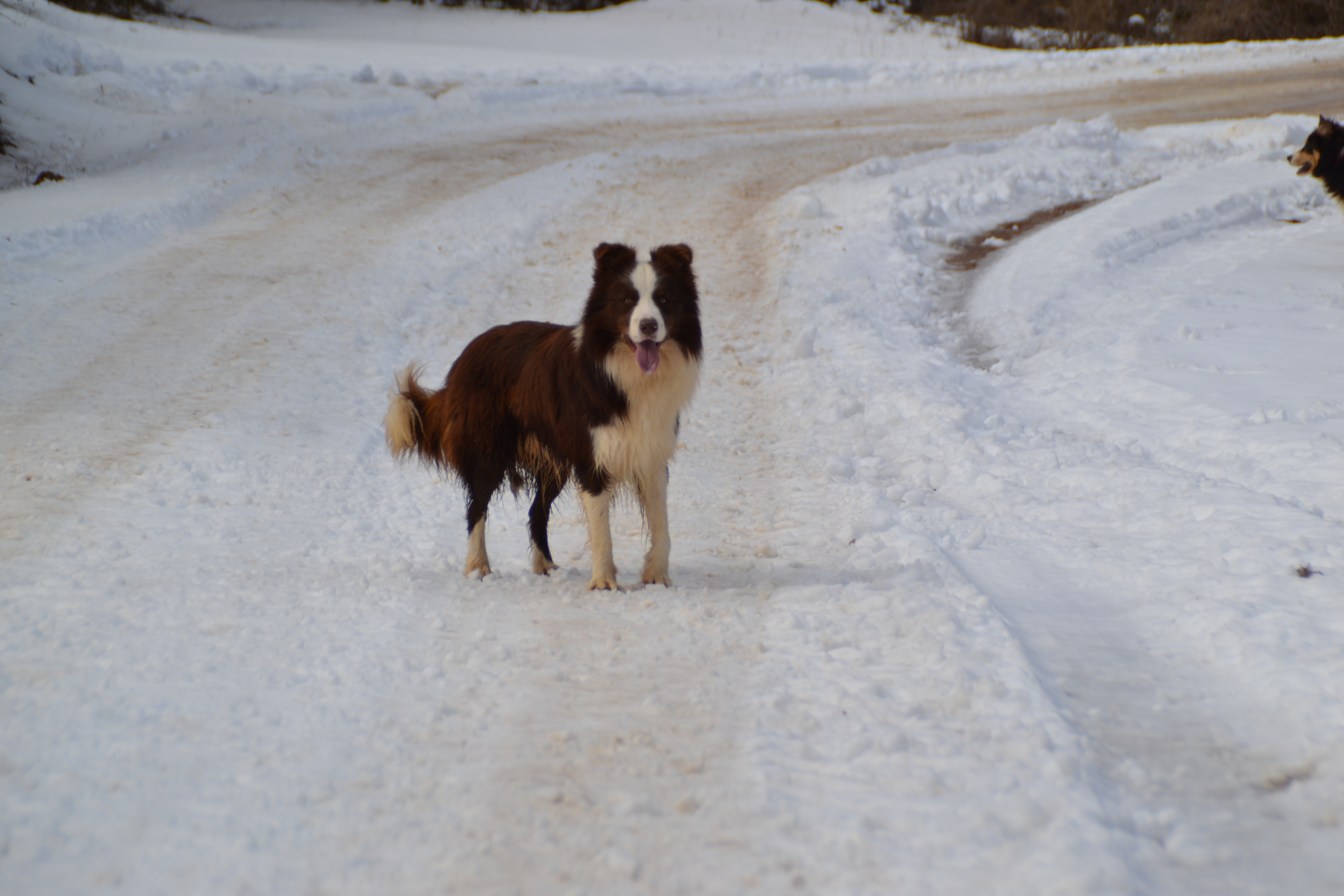
Chocolate Border Collie. Male.

Border Collies are, on average, medium-sized dogs with a moderate amount of coat, which is often thick and prone to shedding. They have a double coat that varies from smooth to rough and is occasionally curled. While black and white is the most common colouring, the breed appears in just about any colour and pattern known to occur in dogs. Some of these include black tricolour (black/tan/white), liver and white, and red tricolour (red/tan/white) which have also been seen regularly, and other colours such as blue, lilac, red merle, blue merle, brindle, and Australian red (also known as ee red, blonde, recessive red, or gold) which is seen less frequently. Some Border Collies may also have single-colour coats.

Eye colour varies from brown to green, and occasionally eyes of differing colour occur; this is usually seen with merles. This trait is known as heterochromia. The ears of the Border Collie are also variable – some have fully erect ears, some fully dropped ears, and others semi-erect ears (similar to those of the rough collie).

Although working Border Collie handlers sometimes have superstitions about the appearance of their dogs (handlers may avoid mostly white dogs due to the unfounded idea that sheep will not respect a white or almost all white dog), in general, the American Border Collie Association considers a dog's appearance to be irrelevant. Instead, it is considered more useful to identify a working Border Collie by its working abilities.

Dogs bred for show are more homogeneous in appearance than working Border Collies since to win in conformation showing they must conform closely to breed club standards that are specific on many points of the structure, coat, and colour. Kennel clubs specify, for example, that the Border Collie must have a "keen and intelligent" expression, and that the preferred eye colour is dark brown. In deference to the dog's working origin, scars and broken teeth received in the line of duty are not to be counted against a Border Collie in the show ring. The males' height from withers comes from 48 to 56 centimetres (19 to 22 in), females from 46 to 53 centimetres (18 to 21 in).

It has been claimed to be the most intelligent breed of dog.

== Health ==
=== Life span ===
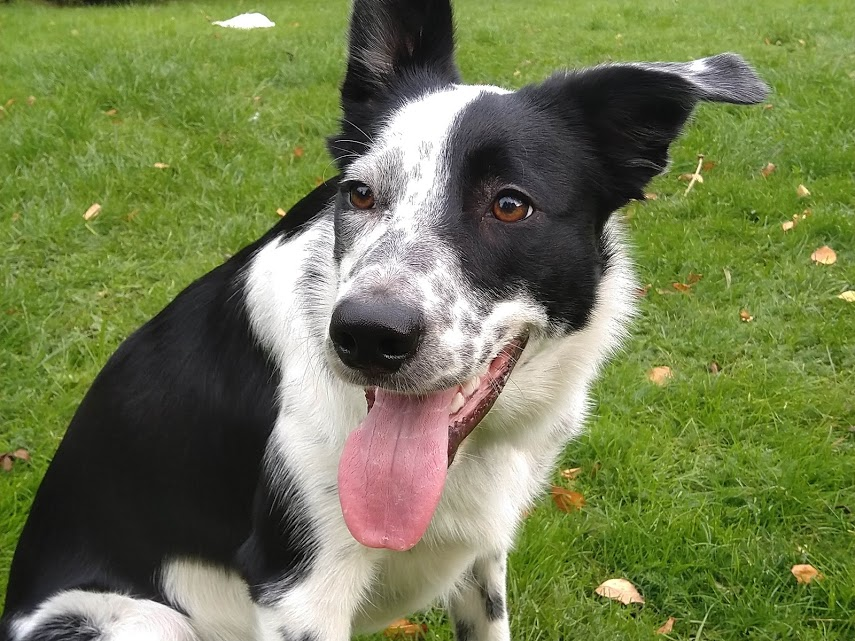
Smooth coated Border Collie. Young female.

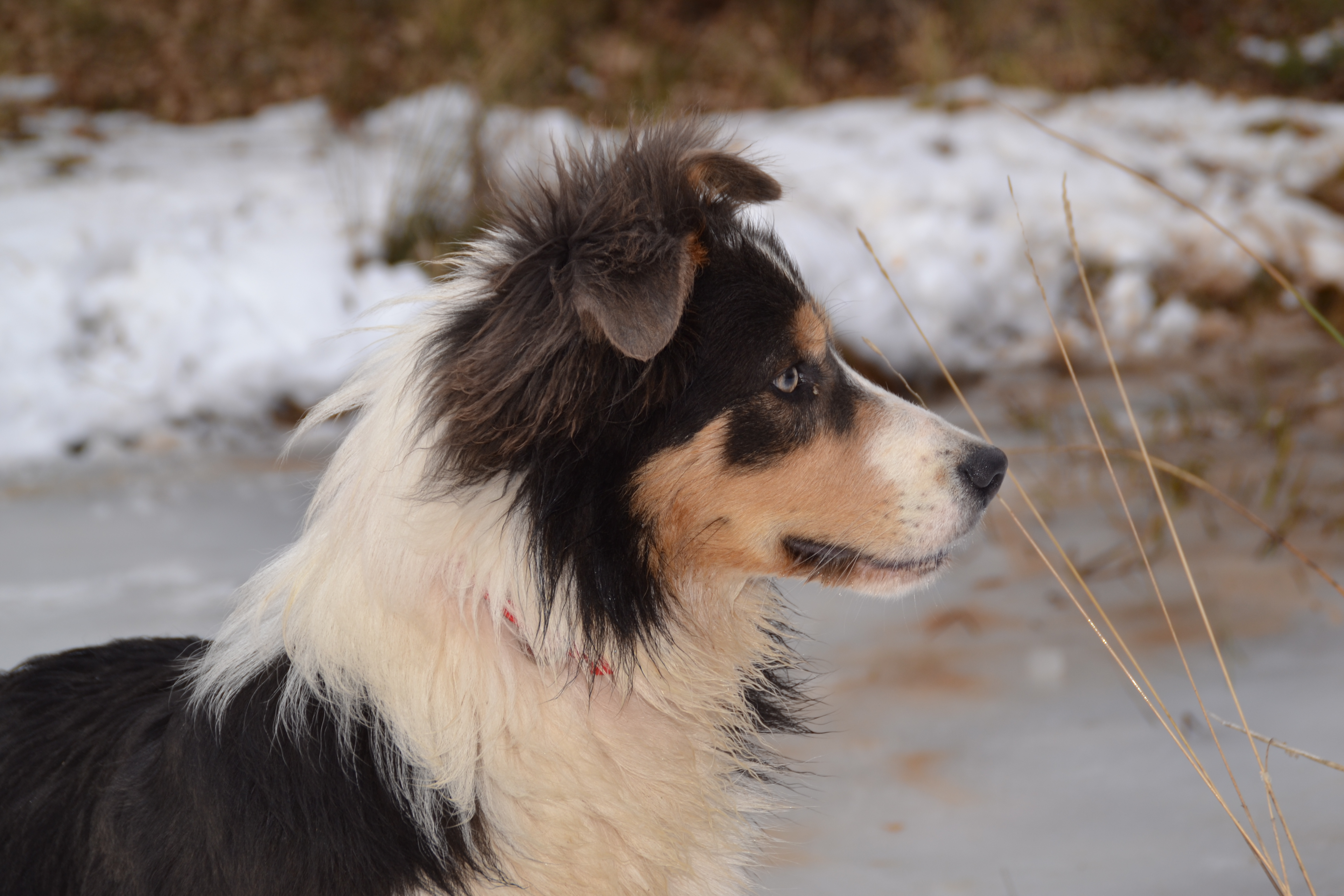
Tricolour Border Collie. Young male.

A 2022 study in England of veterinary records found a life expectancy of 12.1 years, slightly higher than the 11.82 life expectancy for crossbreed dogs. A 2024 UK study found a life expectancy of 13.1 years for the breed compared to an average of 12.7 for purebreeds and 12 for crossbreeds.

Leading causes of death in a 2004 Kennel Club survey were cancer (23.6%), old age (17.9%) and cerebral vascular afflictions (9.4%).

=== Conditions ===
Collie eye anomaly is an autosomal recessive condition caused by an autosomal recessive mutation in the NHEJ1 gene that affects Collies and related breeds, such as the Border Collie.

Two types of hearing loss occur in the breed. The first type is pigment associated and is found in Border Collie puppies, although the puppies can have congenital sensorineural deafness from birth as well. The second type is known as adult-onset hearing loss. These dogs have a normal auditory brainstem response test as pups but gradually lose their hearing some time between one and eight years of age. The American Border Collie Association's Health & Education Foundation (ABCA HEF) is supporting research into the genetic causes of this disease. Suspect regions of the genome have been identified, but the exact causal mutation(s) have not so far been located.

Neuronal ceroid lipofuscinosis (NCL) is a rare but serious disease that is limited to show Border Collies. NCL results in severe neurological impairment and early death; afflicted dogs rarely survive beyond two years of age. The mutation causing the form of the disease found in Border Collies was identified by Scott Melville in the laboratory of Alan Wilton of the School of Biotechnology and Biomolecular Sciences, University of New South Wales. There is no treatment or cure, but a DNA test is now available to detect carriers as well as affected dogs.

Trapped Neutrophil Syndrome (TNS) is a hereditary disease in which the bone marrow produces neutrophils (white cells) but is unable to effectively release them into the bloodstream. Affected puppies have an impaired immune system and will eventually die from infections they cannot fight. The mutation responsible for TNS has been found in Border Collies, in English working dogs, in show dogs that had originated in Australia and New Zealand, and in unrelated Australian working dogs. This indicates that the gene is widespread and probably as old as the breed itself. TNS was identified by Jeremy Shearman in the laboratory of Alan Wilton of the School of Biotechnology and Biomolecular Sciences, University of New South Wales. There is no cure, but a DNA test is now available to detect carriers as well as affected dogs.

Other diseases found less commonly include juvenile cataracts, osteochondritis, hypothyroidism, diabetes mellitus and canine cyclic neutropaenia, carpal soft-tissue injury.

A syndrome of exercise-induced collapse similar to that seen in Labrador Retrievers, otherwise termed Border Collie Collapse and triggered by episodes of collapse associated with periods of intense exercise has been described in Border Collies in North America, Europe and Australia, and is currently the subject of further investigation. Border Collie Collapse or "the wobbles" is a disease found in many herding/working breeds. The cause is currently unknown. Border Collie Collapse seems to be related to high-intensity exercises that are found to be particularly exciting to the individual dog. For example, some dogs cannot retrieve a tennis ball, as they find this activity highly stimulating, but can run for several miles with no symptoms of Border Collie Collapse. Symptoms commonly include disorientation, mental dullness, loss of attention, unsteady hind legs, dragging of hind legs, and ultimately the need to sit or lie down. Loss of consciousness and seizure-like trembling/spasms are not characteristics of Border Collie Collapse. There is no current diagnostic test or veterinary workup that can confirm Border Collie Collapse, and the diagnosis is often given as a diagnosis of exclusion, or based on clinical symptoms. There is no current treatment recommended, and it is advised to limit the episodes by avoiding the activities that trigger the collapse.

A study in the UK looking at clinical records found the Border Collie to have the highest prevalence of hepatic neoplasia. Border Collies were 2.67 times more likely to acquire the condition than other breeds.

The Border Collie is one of the more commonly affected breeds for a mutation in the MDR1 gene. This mutation results in the affected animal being more susceptible to negative effects of drugs at volumes that are otherwise safe. Common drugs such as doramectin and ivermectin will cause neurotoxicosis. The mutation has a frequency of 1–4.8% depending on the country.

== Breed standards ==
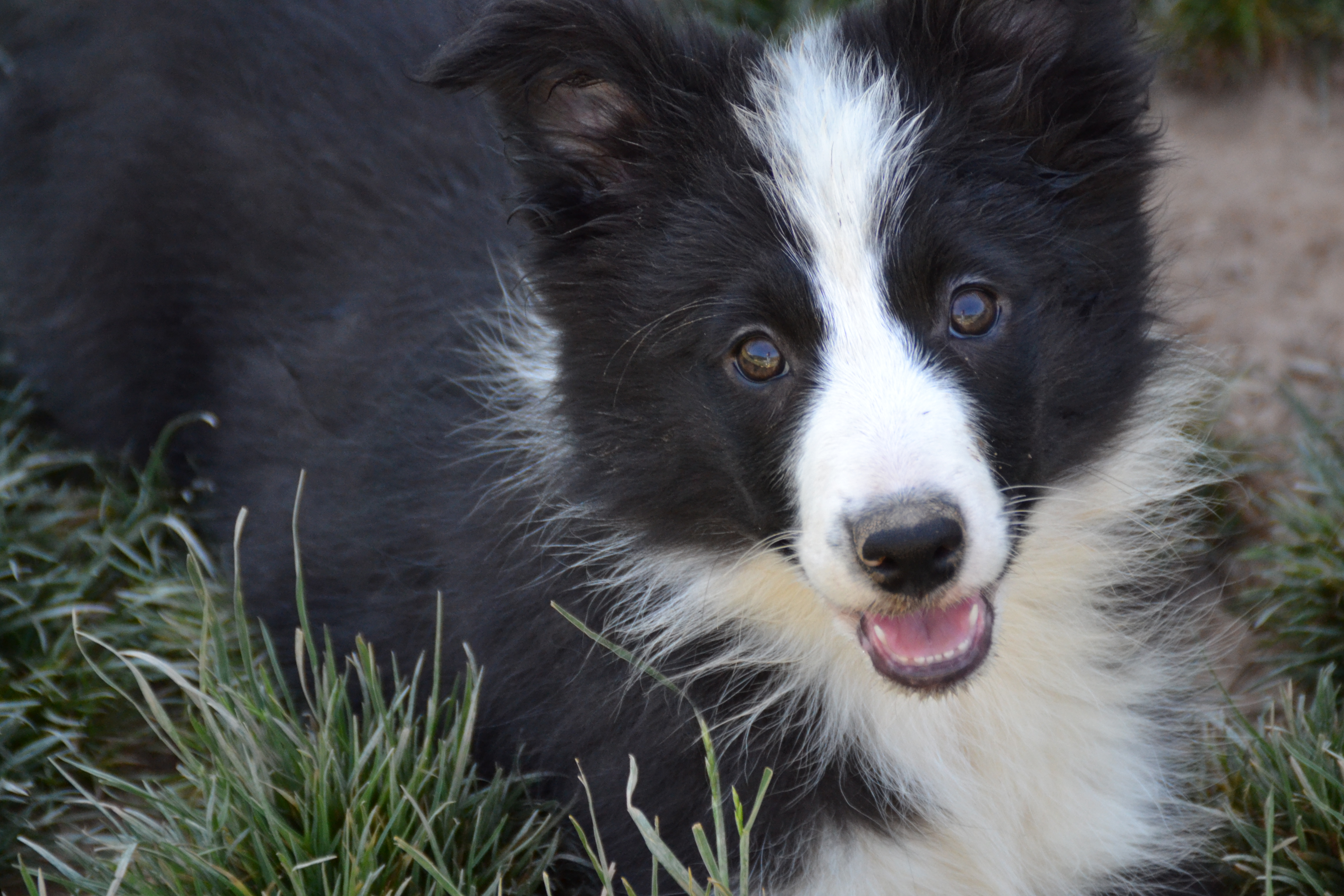
Black & white Border Collie. Female puppy.

There are two types of tests, or standards, to determine the breeding quality of a Border Collie: the original ISDS sheepdog trial and appearance.

=== ISDS sheepdog trial ===
The original test is the ISDS sheepdog trial. It is still used today, where a dog and handler collect groups of livestock and move them quietly around a course. There are certain standard elements to this test depending on the level: national or international. For both levels, sheep must be gathered as calmly as possible without being distressed. For a national competition, normally held between England, Ireland, Scotland, and Wales, trials run over a 400-yard course. International courses use a 400-yard course for the qualifying trials, but on the third and final day, trials are held in a course of 800 yards.

The international test involves a "double fetch", where the sheepdog must gather 10 sheep from 800 yards away, bring them on an angle to the centre of the field, and then be sent back in another direction to gather another 10 sheep, also placed 800 yards from the handler. Five of those 20 sheep will have collars on, and at the end of a triangular drive, the sheep are gathered into a circular "shedding ring" and the 15 sheep without collars are driven away as the five collared sheep are kept inside the ring and then penned. Sheepdogs must be directed through obstacles at varying distance from the handler, and then the dog must demonstrate the ability to do work close at hand by penning the sheep and sorting them out.

== Registries ==
=== Australia ===
Border Collies are registered with an Australian National Kennel Council (ANKC) affiliated state control body or with a working dog registry. Between 2,011 and 2,701 ANKC pedigreed Border Collies have been registered with the ANKC each year since 1986. Inclusion on the ANKC affiliate's main register allows Border Collies to compete in conformation, obedience, agility, tracking, disc dog, herding and other ANKC-sanctioned events held by an ANKC affiliated club, while inclusion on the limited register prohibits entry in conformation events. The ANKC provides a breed standard; however, this applies to conformation events only and has no influence on dogs entering performance events. Non-ANKC pedigreed dogs may also be eligible for inclusion on an ANKC associate or sporting register and be able to compete in ANKC performance or herding events. Agility organisations such as the Agility Dog Association of Australia (ADAA) have their own registry which allows the inclusion of any dog wishing to compete in their events.

=== Canada ===
Agriculture Canada has recognised the Canadian Border Collie Association as the registry under the Animal Pedigree Act for any Border Collie that is designated as a "Pure Breed" in Canada.

The criteria used are based on herding lineage rather than appearance. It is a two-tiered registry in that dogs imported that are registered with a foreign Kennel Club that does hold conformation shows are given a "B" registration, whereas those that come directly from other working registries are placed on the "A" registry.

Recently, the Canadian Kennel Club has polled its members to decide if Border Collies should be included on the CKC "Miscellaneous List". This designation would allow Border Collie owners the ability to compete in all CKC events, but the CKC would not be the registering body. People who compete in performance events support the move. The CBCA is against this designation.

=== South Africa ===
The registration of working sheepdogs in South Africa is the responsibility of the South African Sheepdog Association. ISDS-registered dogs imported into the country can be transferred onto the SASDA register. Dogs not registered can become eligible for registration by being awarded a certificate of working ability by a registered judge. Occasionally they will facilitate the testing of dogs used for breeding, for hip dysplasia and collie eye anomaly, to encourage the breeding of dogs without these genetic flaws.

=== Turkey ===
The registration of working Border Collies in Turkey is the province of the Border Collie Dernegi (Turkish Border Collie Association) established in 2007.

=== United Kingdom ===
Dogs can be registered with the national Kennel Club like any other recognised breed; a breed society, the International Sheep Dog Society, registers only dogs with proven herding ability.

=== United States ===
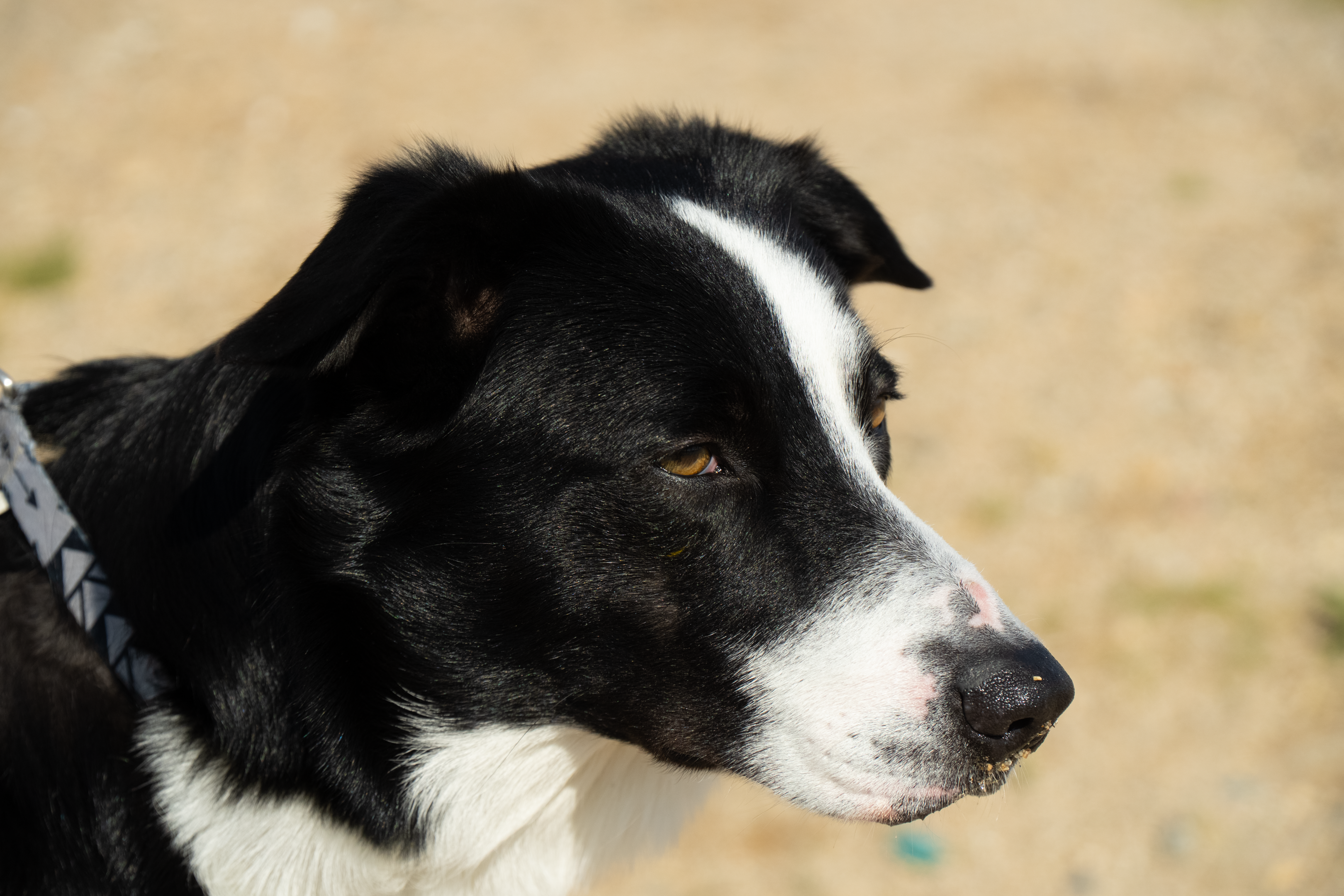
A Border Collie registered with the AKC and having an ABCA certificate of descent

The principal registry for Border Collies in the United States is the American Border Collie Association (ABCA), which is dedicated to the preservation of the traditional working dog. The breed was also recognised in 1995 by the American Kennel Club (AKC) after occupying the AKC's Miscellaneous Class for over 50 years. The recognition was under protest from the majority of Border Collie affiliated groups, such as the United States Border Collie Club, which felt that emphasis on the breed's working skills would be lost under AKC recognition. AKC registrations have gradually increased since recognition and by 2004 there were 1,984 new AKC registrations of Border Collies, with a further 2,378 for the year 2005. By contrast, the American Border Collie Association registers approximately 20,000 Border Collies annually. Because of the inherent tension between the goals of breeding to a working standard and to an appearance standard, the American Border Collie Association voted in 2003 that dogs who attained a conformation championship would be delisted from the ABCA registry, regardless of ability. Cross-registration is allowed between the working registries, and AKC accepts dogs registered with ABCA, but none of the working registries in the U.S. honor AKC pedigrees.

=== Elsewhere ===
The Border Collie breed is also recognised as the prime sheepdog by the International Stock Dog Federation (ISDF), based in Piccadilly, London, UK.

== Uses ==
Common uses of the Border Collie include herding, tracking, and dog sports.

=== Livestock work ===
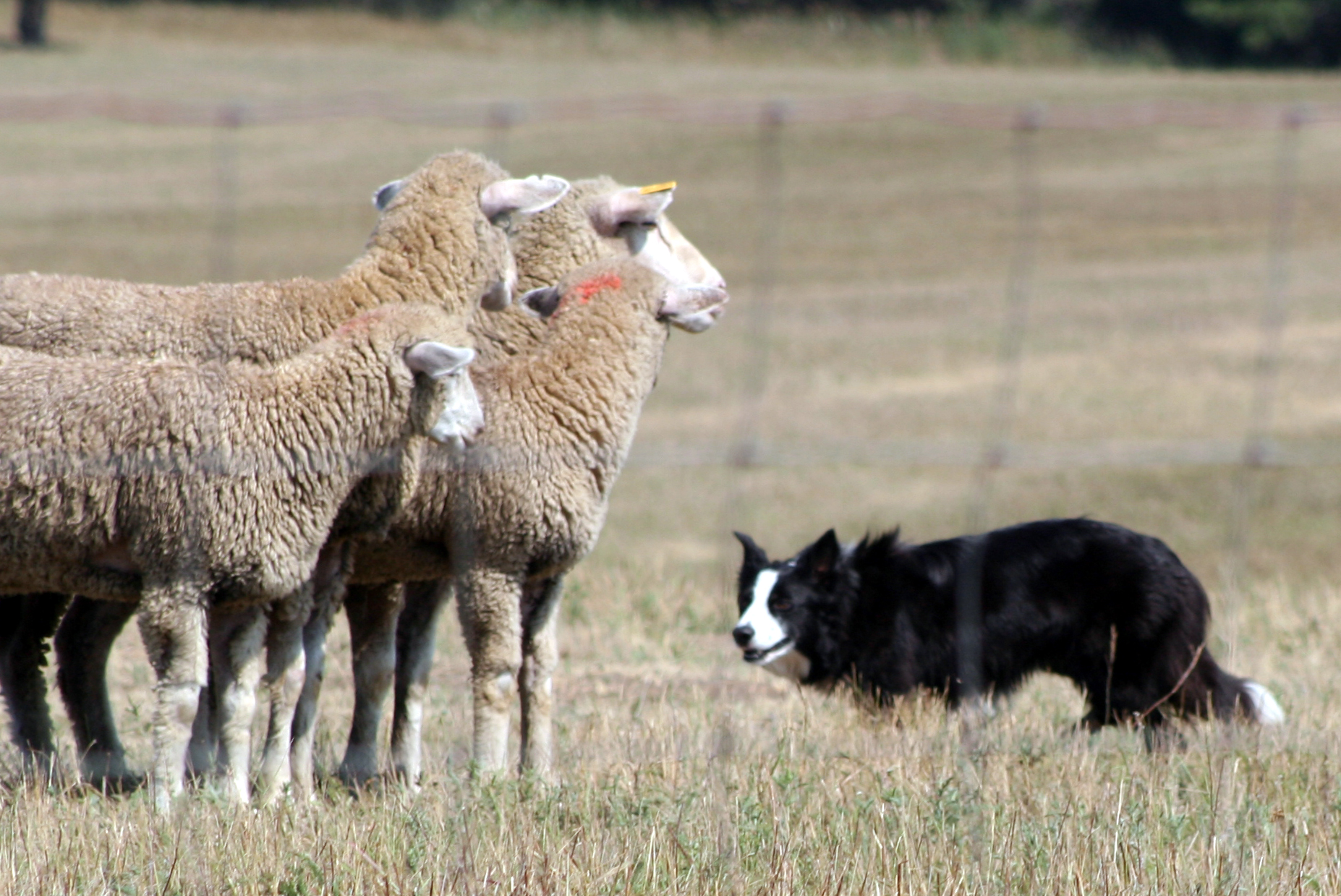
The Border Collie uses a direct stare at sheep, known as "the eye", to intimidate while herding.

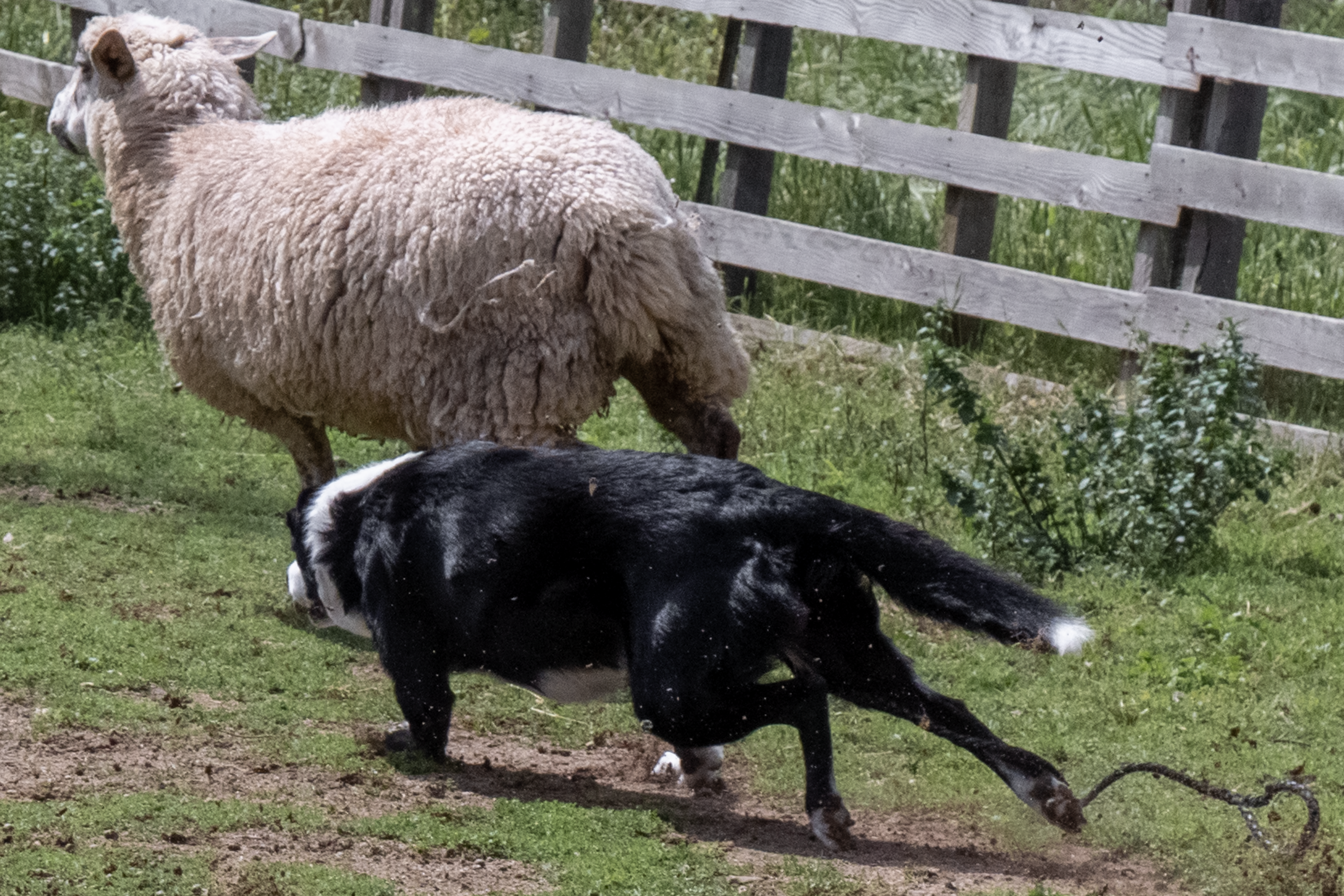
Black and white Border Collie herding a sheep

Working Border Collies can take direction by voice and by whistle at long distances when herding. Their energy and herding instinct are still used to herd a variety of animals, from sheep and cattle, to free-range poultry, pigs, and ostriches. They are also used to remove unwanted wild birds from airport runways, golf courses, and other public and private areas.

Shepherds in the UK have taken the most critical elements of herding and incorporated them into a sheepdog trial. The first recorded sheepdog trials were held in Bala, North Wales, in 1873. These competitions enable farmers and shepherds to evaluate possible mates for their working dogs, but they have developed a sport aspect as well, with competitors from outside the farming community also taking part.

In the US, the national sanctioning body for these competitions is the USBCHA. In the UK it is the International Sheep Dog Society, in Canada the Canadian Border Collie Association (CBCA) and in South Africa it is the South African Sheepdog Association.

=== Dog sports ===
Border Collies are one of the most popular breeds for dog agility competitions. They also excel at competitive obedience, showmanship, flyball, tracking, and sheepdog trials and herding events.

They perform well at some higher jump heights at dog agility competitions, so much so that in England, competitions often include classes for ABC dogs, "Anything But Collies".

The Border Collie's speed, agility, and stamina have allowed them to dominate in dog activities like flyball and disc dog competitions. Their trainability has also given them a berth in dog dancing competitions.

Border Collies have a highly developed sense of smell and with their high drive make excellent and easily motivated tracking dogs for tracking trials. These trials simulate the finding of a lost person in a controlled situation where the performance of the dog can be evaluated, with titles awarded for successful dogs. Border Collies are used as search dogs in mountain rescue in Britain. They are particularly useful for searching large areas of hillside and avalanche debris. Hamish MacInnes believed that dark-coated dogs are less prone to snow blindness.

== Research ==
The impressive intelligence of the Border Collie has made it a viable subject for research. In particular, the Georgia Institute of Technology's FIDO (Facilitating Interactions for Dogs with Occupations) project demonstrated the ability of intelligent dogs to communicate with humans. In particular, a project at the institute's BrainLab instrumented a Border Collie named Sky to activate a sensor worn by the dog which allowed Sky to communicate in audible English with its handler. One intent was to allow service dogs to warn their owners of impending danger, or to alert others to emergency situations involving their handler, especially those which might involve in incapacitation.

== Notable dogs ==
- Rico, who was studied for recognising up to 200 objects by name. Another Border Collie, Betsy, was found to have a vocabulary of over 300 words.
- Chaser had a vocabulary of 1,022 words, could reason by exclusion, and could recognise objects by the groups they belong to.
- Shep, who was the long-term companion to John Noakes of the BBC's Blue Peter and Meg, companion of Matt Baker, former presenter of the same show
- Shep was also a dog that appeared at a railway station in 1936 and watched his dead master be loaded onto a train. He remained there, waiting for his master to return, for the next five and a half years.
- Jean, also known as the Vitagraph Dog, who was the first canine movie star (owned and trained by Laurence Trimble)
- Messi, a Border Collie who starred as "Snoop" in Anatomy of a Fall and won the 2023 Palm Dog award at the Cannes Film Festival
- Tsunami, a search and rescue dog who gained international attention for his role during the 2026 Venezuela earthquakes.
