= Sasda =

Sasda may refer to:

- South African Sheepdog Association or SASDA
- Sasda, a clan of the Bharwad people of India
