= Diocese of Boga-Zaire =

Coordinates: 1°34′N 30°15′E

The Diocese of Boga-Zaire is an Anglican See in the Province of the Anglican Church of the Congo: the first bishop was Philip Ridsdale.

Other bishops include

- Patrice Njojo Byankya
