= West Woodburn =

Coordinates: 55.173°N 2.166°W

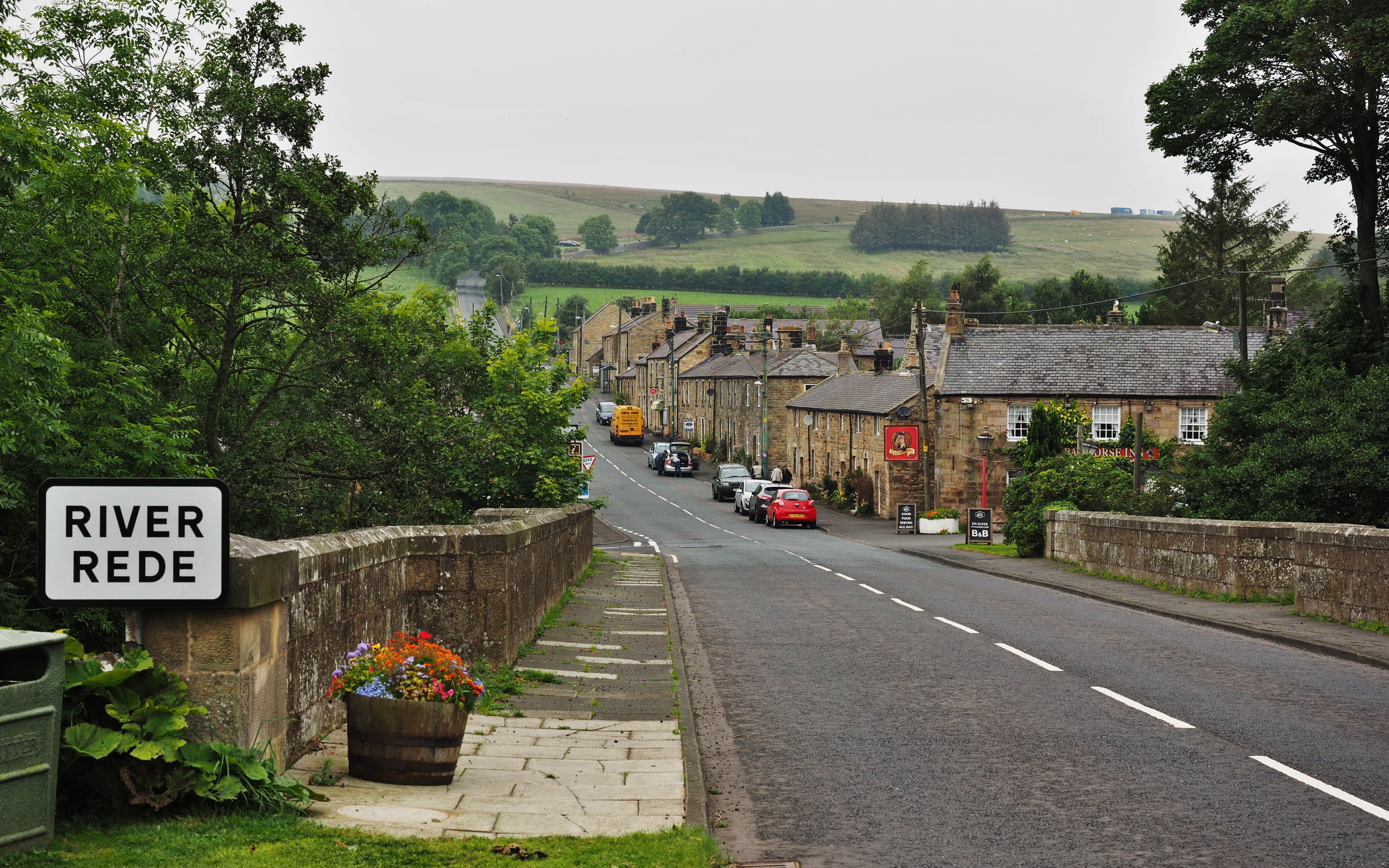

- Location within Northumberland
- Population: 492 [2001]
- OS grid reference: NY895865
- Civil parish: Corsenside
- Unitary authority: Northumberland
- Ceremonial county: Northumberland
- Region: North East
- Country: England
- Sovereign state: United Kingdom
- Post town: HEXHAM
- Postcode district: NE48
- Dialling code: 01434
- Police: Northumbria
- Fire: Northumberland
- Ambulance: North East
- UK Parliament: Hexham

West Woodburn is a village in north-western Northumberland, England. The 2001 census recorded a population of 492 in the parish of Corsenside, of which West Woodburn is the main settlement. The village is 15 miles (24 km) south of the border with Scotland and about 13 miles (21 km) north of Hexham.

West Woodburn lies on the line of Dere Street, a Roman road which linked Eboracum (York) to the area around Din Eidyn (Edinburgh), and thus later England to Scotland. To the west is the remains of a Roman fort known as Habitancum. The route is now the A68 road.

The River Rede, a major tributary of the River North Tyne, flows through the heart of the village. The river gives its name to the valley of Redesdale, as the local area is called.

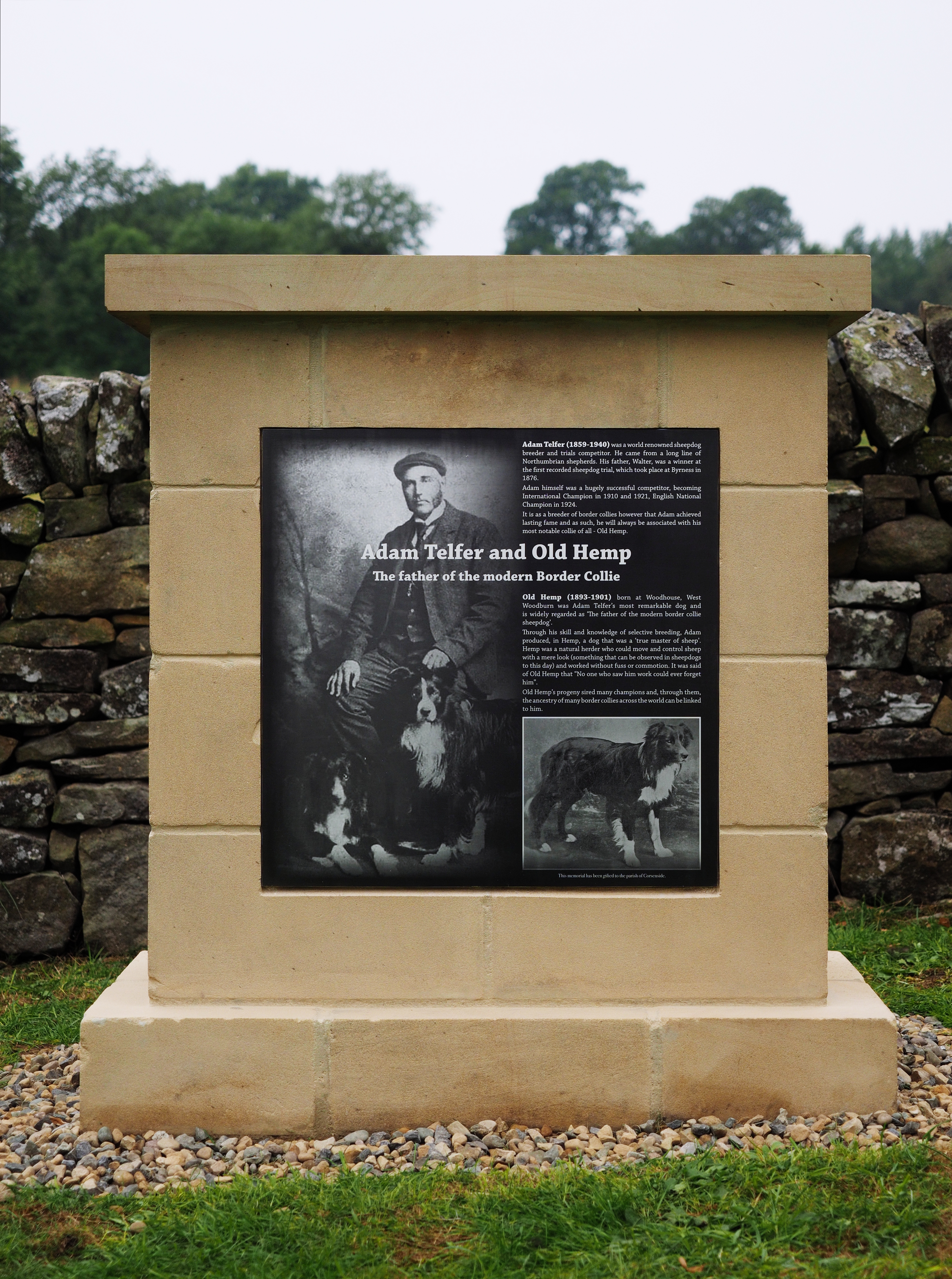
Telfer and Old Hemp Memorial

An influential resident of West Woodburn was Adam Telfer and his sheepdog Old Hemp. Telfer was a shepherd who lived in the village circa 1893 and is best known for being the man who first bred the Border Collie sheepdog. A campaign was started to install a memorial to Telfer and Old Hemp, and permission was granted by the relevant authorities. The memorial was unveiled on 8 September 2015.

== Governance ==
West Woodburn is in the parliamentary constituency of Hexham.
