= East Woodburn =

Village in Northumberland, England

Coordinates: 55°10′30.19″N 2°8′47.25″W

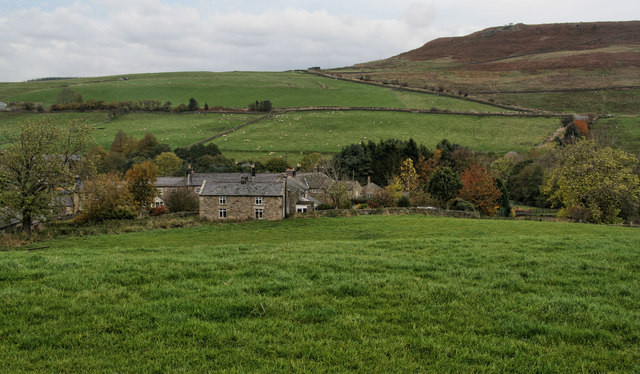

East Woodburn is a village located in Corsenside civil parish, Northumberland, England. Located off the A68 road just south of Darney Crag, it was created in conjunction with the Darney quarry, which provided its distinct fine to medium grained pale gold through, light buff to almost blond in colour sandstone.
