= Corsenside =

Coordinates: 55.199°N 2.182°W

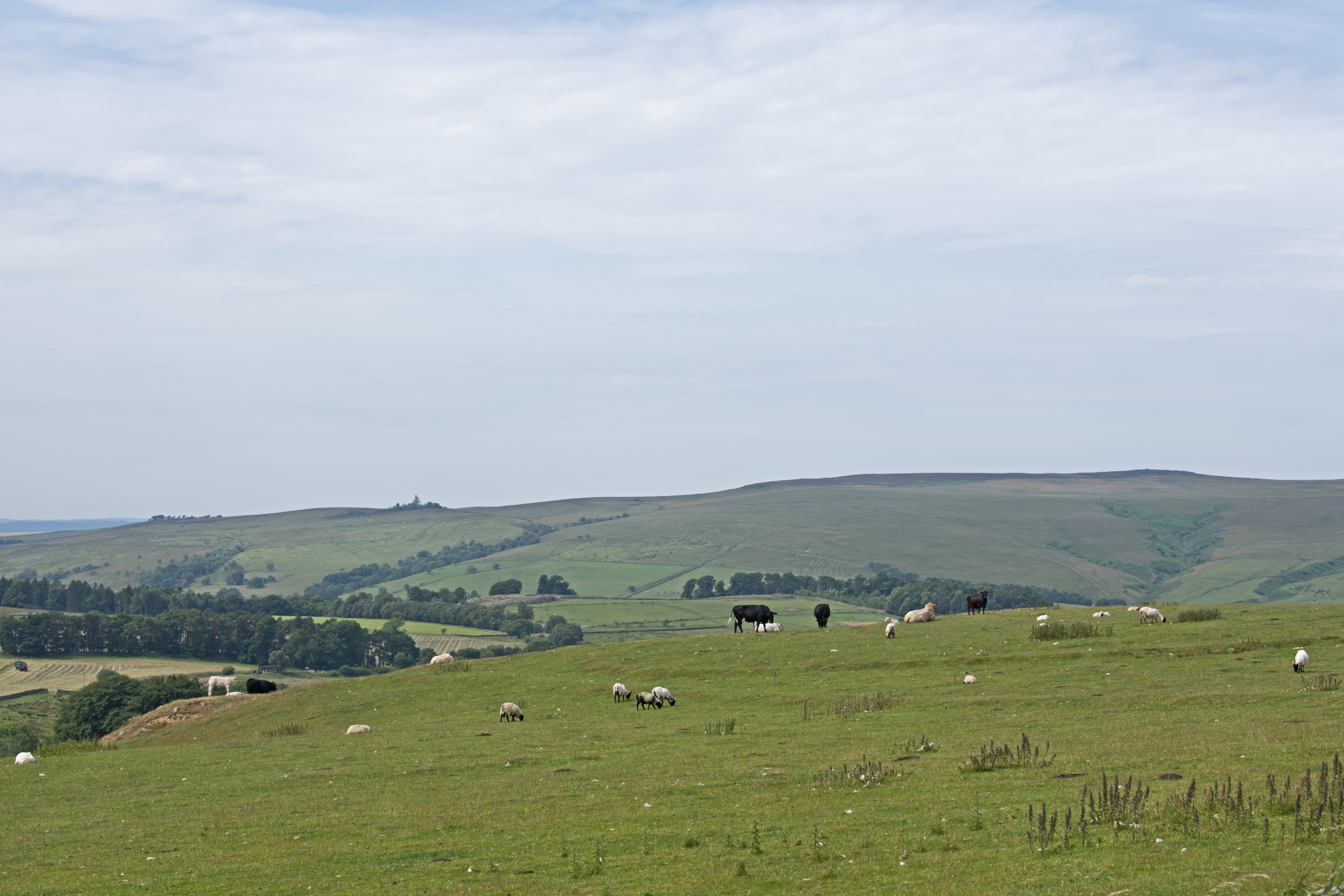
- Hills between Ridsdale and Woodburn Station

- Location within Northumberland
- Population: 518 (2011)
- OS grid reference: NY885895
- Unitary authority: Northumberland
- Ceremonial county: Northumberland
- Region: North East
- Country: England
- Sovereign state: United Kingdom
- Post town: HEXHAM
- Postcode district: NE48
- Dialling code: 01434
- Police: Northumbria
- Fire: Northumberland
- Ambulance: North East
- UK Parliament: Hexham

Corsenside is one of the largest parishes in Northumberland, however the area is mainly a vast expanse of rolling hills and farmland, with three tiny villages: West Woodburn, East Woodburn and Ridsdale with about 600 inhabitants in total. The area runs alongside the A68 road about 17 miles (27 km) north of Corbridge. The A68 roughly follows the route of the old Roman 'Dere Street'. There are many historic points of interest in this area including the remains of the Roman Camp of Habitancum, Bell Knowe an Iron Age burial site, and the remains of Ridsdale Iron Works, which had its heyday in the Industrial Revolution.

== Governance ==
Corsenside is in the parliamentary constituency of Hexham.

== Geography ==
Corsenside is on the River Rede, which flows from the Scottish border south through the Northumberland National Park and Corsenside before meeting the River North Tyne at Redesmouth. The A68 road also runs north–south, crossing the Rede at West Woodburn, the main village in the parish, with a pub, school, and post office. East Woodburn is on minor roads to the east, and Ridsdale, with 80 houses and the Gun Inn pub, on the A68 in the south of the parish.

== Religious sites ==
The tiny church of St. Cuthbert at Corsenside, between the road and the river, contains a Norman chancel arch. The age and dedication of the church makes it probable that this was one of the spots where the body of St. Cuthbert rested during the flight of the monks from Holy Island, 875–882 AD. They probably came here from Elsdon; and continued by way of Bellingham, Haydon Bridge, Beltingham, etc. The neighbouring house with small mullioned windows is a 17th-century building.
