= J. Ridsdale =

English footballer

Personal information
- Position: Wing half

Senior career*
Years	Team	Apps	(Gls)
1888–1889	Burnley	1	(0)
1889	Brierfield		
- * Club domestic league appearances and goals

J. Ridsdale was an English professional footballer who played as a wing half.

Essentially a reserve-team player, Ridsdale made his Football League debut for Burnley on 22 September 1888 at Dudley Road, the then home of Wolverhampton Wanderers. He was deputising at right half for the suspended Jack Abrams. Burnley lost the match 4–1, and that was Ridsdale's only appearance in the 22-match 1888–89 League season. He joined Brierfield in 1889.
