= Leone Ridsdale =

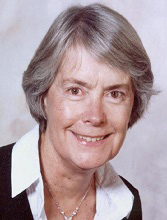
Leone Ridsdale .
- Neurologist, General Practitioner, CBT Therapist
- Headache, Fatigue, Epilepsy

Leone Ridsdale is Professor of Neurology and General Practice at King's College London. Her research has focused on self-education and/or CBT therapy for people with headache, chronic fatigue and epilepsy. Her teaching focus was on developing education for medical students and graduates to improve neurology patient care in the community.

== Training and interests ==
Ridsdale trained in economics and social policy at the London School of Economics, specializing in education and medical care. After lecturing on health and social care at Manchester University, she studied medicine at McMaster University Medical School in Canada. Her specialist training in medicine, psychiatry, and neurology was at McGill University and the Montreal Neurological Institute. She accredited as a neurologist in Canada and the US in 1980, and returned to the UK.

Finding North American training was not recognised in the UK, Ridsdale trained and practiced as a GP. She then set up an MSc in General Practice at Guy's and St Thomas's Medical School. The course combined social science and medical care, and led her to publish books on evidence-based practice.

Later, Ridsdale was accredited as a Neurologist in the UK, and appointed Director of medical student teaching in neurology at King's College London. She focused the curriculum on common neurology problems and core skills. Students subsequently reported more confidence and competence, and less 'neurophobia'.

=== Continuing Professional Development ===
Ridsdale did a master's degree in Life-Writing at Sussex University, and collaborated with KCL's English Department on Life-Writing research. She trained in CBT Therapy at Oxford University and continues in practice.

== Research ==
=== Chronic Fatigue ===
Ridsdale did a GP cohort study of patients with chronic fatigue, leading to a PhD. Poor recovery rates, led her onto three trials testing therapies including counselling, cognitive-behaviour therapy (CBT) and graded-exercise.

=== Headache ===
Linking neurology and general practice, Ridsdale and colleagues described the commonness of patients presenting with headache in general practice, why they were referred to neurologists, whether this might be reduced by GP direct access to MRI, and the potential contribution of GPs with Special Interest and CBT.

=== Epilepsy ===
Ridsdale described the commonness and unmet needs for education among people with epilepsy, testing interventions by specially trained nurses in three trials. Using general practice electronic records, Ridsdale and colleagues described risk factors for death in epilepsy, and the potential for identifying risks routinely, with step-up care aimed at reducing premature loss of life in epilepsy.

Ridsdale was the Chief Investigator on a National Institute for Health Research (NIHR) funded trial which assessed the effectiveness of a course called "Self-Management education for adults with Epilepsy (SMILE-UK)" in helping those with poorly controlled epilepsy to manage.
