= Philip Ridsdale =

Anglican bishop

Philip Ridsdale (b Hendon 2 December 1915 - d Cambridge 14 June 2000) was an Anglican bishop in Zaire: he served as the inaugural Bishop of Boga-Zaire.

Ridsdale was educated at Harrow; Trinity College, Cambridge; and Ridley Hall, Cambridge. Ridsdale served in Uganda and the Democratic Republic of the Congo, as a CMS missionary before the Second World War and as an ordained priest after it. During World War II itself he served with the King's African Rifles, and was wounded in Burma in 1945. He was Rural Dean of Hoima then Archdeacon of Rwenzori. From 1964 to 1972 he was the incumbent at Stapleford, Hertfordshire (and Rural Dean of Hertford). In 1972 he went back as bishop, retiring in 1980.
