= George Ridsdale =

English footballer

Personal information
- Date of birth: 1878
- Place of birth: Blackburn, England
- Position: Wing half

Senior career*
Years	Team	Apps	(Gls)
1901–1902	Burnley	3	(0)
- * Club domestic league appearances and goals

George Ridsdale (born 1878) was an English professional footballer who played as a wing half. He played in the Football League for Burnley.
