= South African Sheepdog Association =

The South African Sheepdog Association (SASDA) is an association responsible for organising and controlling sheepdog related activities in South Africa. This involves overseeing the competitions (sheepdog trials) that are held by regional clubs during the year and maintaining the stud book to manage the registration of sheepdogs in South Africa. It also works with the regional clubs in an effort to further the spread of interest in sheepdogs as useful working resources in the life of the stock farmer and to encourage handlers to participate in competition. Competition is seen as a way to maintain the standard of breeding and training of working sheepdogs.

== History ==
The South African Sheepdog Association was established in 1961 when a group of farmers in the Karoo came together to discuss the future of the sheepdog in South Africa. The inaugural meeting, with 13 members present, was held at Union High School in Graaff Reinet and Mr Bun Kingwill was elected as the first president of the association. During the South African championship of that year, "Tess" of Mr Billy Kingwill became the first South African champion under the watchful eye of the judge, Mr Henry Hartzenberg of Graaff Reinet. Since the inauguration of SASDA a South African championship has been held each year. Over time the course has also changed, to upgrade the standard and difficulty to improve the dog's working ability. In the beginning the course was very much like the ones used in Australia but gradually changed to the English version. The current course with the double lift, which has been implemented in 2001, has been taken over virtually as is from the one used for the international championship in the United Kingdom and in so doing putting South African dogs and handlers on the same foot as their overseas counterparts. Through the years the South African Sheepdog Association still strives toward its main objective – to introduce farmers and other interested people to sheepdogs as a labour saving force. This is done through demonstrations and courses, as well as competitions, where breeding success is tested and the best breeding material selected according to working ability. The previous logo appears on the right.

== Structure ==
The association is made up of a number of regional clubs, loosely based on the provinces and regions of South Africa, together with a central office responsible for the maintenance of the registration of dogs and breeders.

== Competition ==
=== Dog of the Year ===
Each club typically holds one trial a year. They normally run for two to three days and are usually arranged in such a way as to give each dog at least two opportunities to compete. Trials that comply with certain standards, including a minimum entry, will be able to advertise as 'Dog of the Year' (DOY) trials. Competitors taking part in these trials will be able to accumulate points towards the DOY competition.

=== Nationals ===
Once a year a national trial is held. It is generally referred to as 'The Nationals'. Handlers all compete on the same trial field on an equal footing and after a number of rounds the most successful dog is awarded the title of National Champion. At the same event the dog that has accumulated the most points at 'Dog of the Year' trials since the last Nationals competition is awarded the title of South Africa Dog of the Year.

=== Categories ===
During club competition dogs compete in three different categories: juniors, seniors and top dogs. Juniors don't do the more challenging tests of skill like shedding and must win a junior trial to qualify for seniors. To qualify for top dogs a dog must win a senior competition and attain a score of at least 90% of the points on offer on the same run. The course for top dogs is more of a test. It includes narrow drive gates and may include a double lift or some other additional test.

=== Beginners ===
Most club trials include a further category: beginners. Any dog can compete in a beginner competition. To qualify for beginner the handler must have never competed in any other trial category. This category was introduced to encourage novices to become part of the family of competitors.

== International Links ==
SASDA have tried to maintain links with similar organisations in other countries. Over the years several experienced handlers from England, Wales, Scotland and the USA have been invited to come and judge important trials, most often the Nationals. The 2006 Nationals were judged by Dick Roper from England. Most international judges invited to travel to judge trials are also invited to run workshops to encourage the sharing of ideas.

South African dogs are not allowed to compete in Europe without first completing six months of quarantine but South African dogs have competed in the USA. In 2005 Faansie Basson and Wally Ward represented South Africa in the USA. At the Meeker Classic Faansie Basson finished 8th in the final with Lad.

Handlers have brought dogs from Europe to compete in South Africa in the past. To do this, before they travel to South Africa, they need to arrange to sell the dogs they bring to local handlers after the competition so that they can leave them behind when they leave.

Occasionally handlers from neighbouring countries will compete in regional trials although this is more the exception than the rule.

== See also ==
- Herding dog
- Working dog
- International Sheep Dog Society
