= International Sheep Dog Society =

Logo for the International Sheep Dog Society (ISDS)

International Sheep Dog Society (ISDS) was formed with the intention of increasing interest in securing the better management of livestock by improving the shepherd's dog to enable further business and community services of the Society. This remains the intention today. It seeks to achieve this by, amongst other things, managing the registration of dogs in its stud book.

The International Sheep Dog Society was founded in 1906, with the purpose of "improving the shepherd's dog". In the early years, the ISDS was centred in the Scottish Borders, but over the years it has grown to be international.

== International Sheepdog Trials ==
An annual international sheepdog trial, has been held every year since 1906, with breaks only for the two World Wars and the 2001 Foot and Mouth outbreak. In 1922, National trials were set up in England, Scotland and Wales to find a national champion for each country and act as qualifying trials for the International trial. Ireland (comprising North, South and the Isle of Man) joined in 1961.

However, further expansion was to come. The International trial was international in that it was a competition "between nations", but because of the rules governing quarantine for dogs entering or re-entering the UK, an all world competition wasn't possible, even though sheepdog trials, many of them using dogs bred in the UK, were taking place in many countries using ISDS rules and judged by ISDS judges, including the Continental (European) trial, which is held annually.

The 2022 International Sheepdog Trials were held in Castle Howard, Yorkshire. The trials were meant to be at Castle Howard in 2020 but the event was cancelled due to the COVID-19 pandemic restrictions and again in 2021. The 2023 International Sheepdog Trials are to be held in Blessington, Co. Wicklow.

== World Sheepdog Trials ==
The first World Trial took place in Bala, North Wales, in 2002, and is now held every three years.

- 2002 – Bala, Wales
- 2005 – Tullamore, Ireland
- 2008 – Llandeilo, Wales
- 2011 – Lowther, England
- 2014 – Tain, Scotland
- 2017 – Hoogwoud, the Netherlands
- 2020 – Cancelled due to the COVID-19 pandemic
- 2023 – Dromore, Northern Ireland

But the ISDS is not only about sheepdog trialling. The ISDS Stud Book was set up in the late 1940s and remains a list of working sheepdogs and their progeny. Knowledge of how a dog is bred is essential for anybody wanting a dogs from a working strain and looking for certain characteristics. The ISDS has also sought to work with the veterinary profession to eradicate genetic defects in the Border Collie such as CEA (Collie Eye Anomaly) and PRA (Progressive Retinal Atrophy) through careful breeding and through the use of DNA tests. There are over 300,000 entries in the Stud Book, and thousands of new entries are added every year, either on the basis of parentage or if a dog has proved itself to be a good working example ("Registered on Merit").

The ISDS also promotes the training of young sheepdog handlers through a number of practical methods, some farm based, some competitive.

The ISDS has several thousand members all over the world with membership rights, which include the bimonthly magazine International Sheepdog News.

== The structure of the International Sheep Dog Society ==
Members from England, Ireland, Scotland and Wales all elect up to ten Directors annually, who meet an annual meeting.

From those Directors, members of the ISDS Council are elected annually, and it is the Council which is the ISDS governing body, the Council members acting as the Trustees of the ISDS, which is a registered charity.

Each of the four nations elect Junior and Senior Vice Presidents and a National President. The Chairman of the ISDS is also elected, and as well as chairing meetings, each chairman has been at the forefront of advancing the Society and in determining policy.

The day-to-day administration of the ISDS is in the hands of the Executive Officer (until 2001 going under the title of ISDS Secretary) who supports the community with independent, confidential and impartial advice services for members, based at the ISDS office in Bedford, where the administrative staff carry out the day to day tasks involved in what over the last 103 years has become a sizeable organisation.

== See also ==
- Herding dogs
- Sheepdog trials
- Working dogs
- SASDA
