= Sheepdog trial =

Competitive herding event

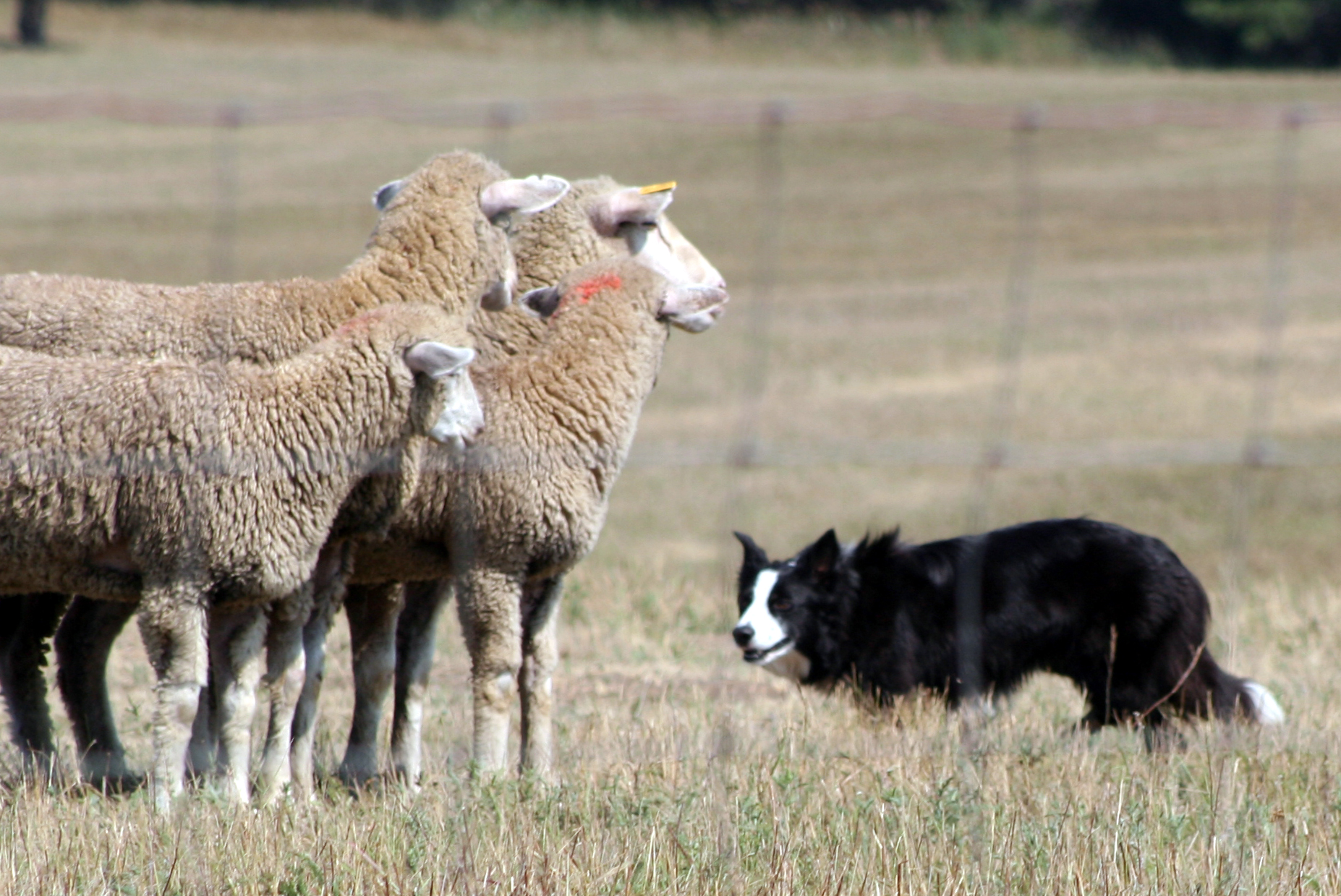
- Border Collie using a direct stare at sheep, known as "the eye", to intimidate while herding at a trial.

A sheepdog trial – also herding event, stock dog trial or simply dog trial — is a competition or test of the working abilities of herding dogs. Such trials were held in the 1860s in New Zealand, and by the 1870s regular trials were also being held in Australia and in the United Kingdom; by the end of the twentieth century the sport had spread to many countries of the world. In competition, dogs demonstrate basic herding management skills assessed by the judge. These events are organised by international and national cynological and sports organisations and by associations of sheep- and cattle-breeders. Usually sheep are to be herded; other animals including ducks or cows may also be used.

Competitions are divided into several levels of difficulty and may use various scoring systems. Rules vary concerning eligible breeds, numbers of dogs and which breeds of sheep are to be used. Most often, the competition programme includes guiding the sheep through several obstacles, collecting them in and out of the pen, separating the sheep from the flock, etc. The judge is evaluating the accuracy of the dog's work under the guidance of a handler.

== History ==
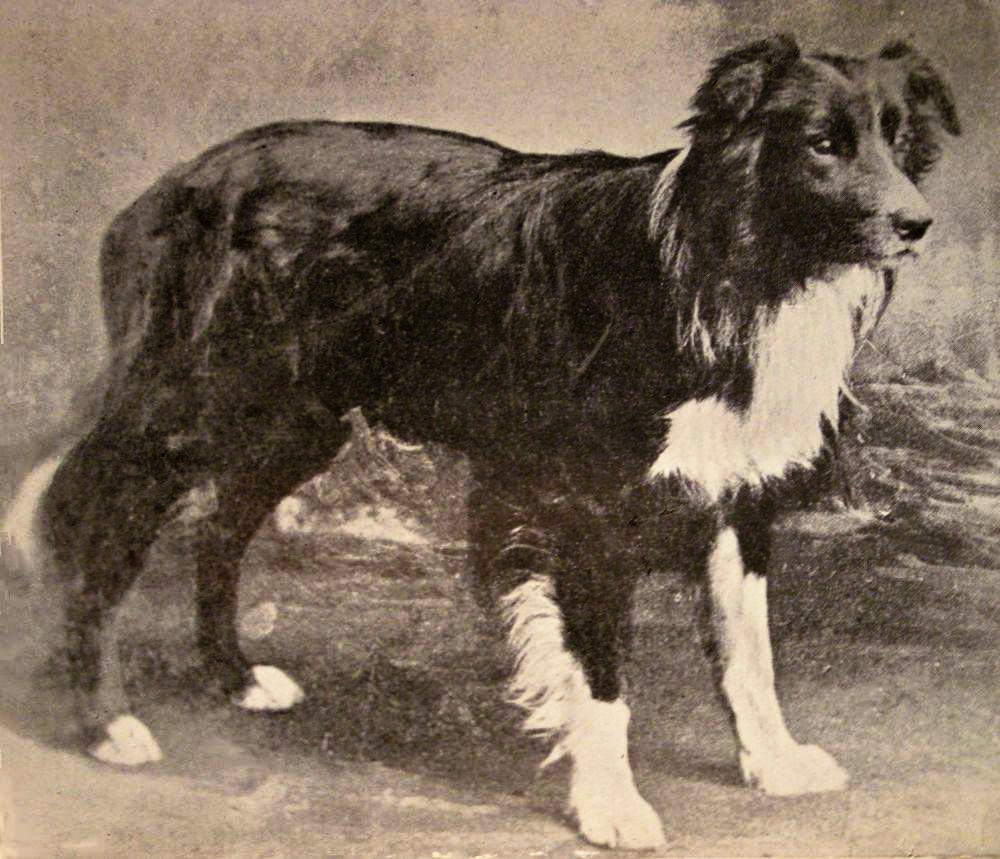
Old Hemp, the "Father of the breed" in border collies

The first dog trials were held in Wānaka, New Zealand, in 1867 with reports of trials at Wānaka, Waitangi and Te Aka in 1868, at Wānaka in 1869 and Haldon Station in the Mackenzie Country in 1870. Australia also has a long history of dog trials, with a Kelpie named Brutus reported in the local paper in Young, NSW, as winning a sheepdog trial in 1871.

At the same time, sheep herding began to develop as a competitive sport in the United Kingdom. The pursuit of sheepdog trialling had been well established since the 1870s in all regions of the UK: England, Ireland, Scotland and Wales. At that time travel was difficult and people were less mobile, so sheepherding trials started as locally organised events.

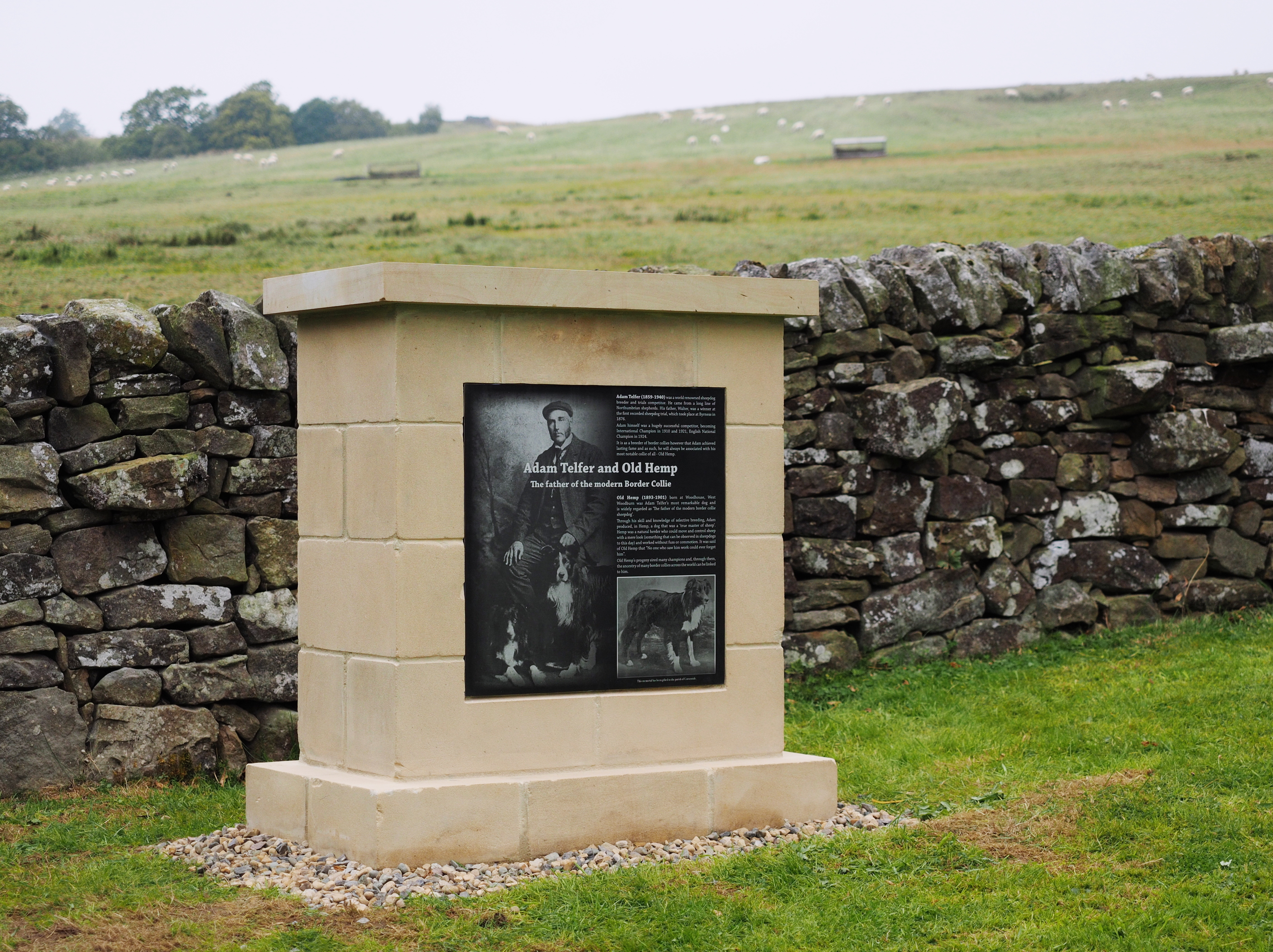
Adam Telfer and Old Hemp Memorial, Northumberland

The first recorded trials involving more than one country were held in 1873 in Bala, Wales. A handler from Scotland took first prize. The sport started to gain popularity rapidly and to develop and attract participants and spectators. William Wallace of Otterburn, Northumberland at the Hawick Trials of 1883 was credited with first demonstrating control of the dog "with a mere hiss at hand and a low whistle at distance". Before then handling was very different: much waving, shouting and barking was involved.

Dogs with the right 'eye' for the task were bred and started to establish as a separate breed. In the 1890s Adam Telfer, of Cambo, Northumberland, bred and trained the dog that is considered the 'father of the breed' in border collies. His name was Old Hemp, he can be multiply traced in the pedigrees of most modern border collies.

At the same time, early sheepdog societies were founded in north-west England and Wales. Their contribution to the development of herding breeds and trials is less well known but should be acknowledged.

== Herding styles ==
=== Gathering herding style (border collie style) ===
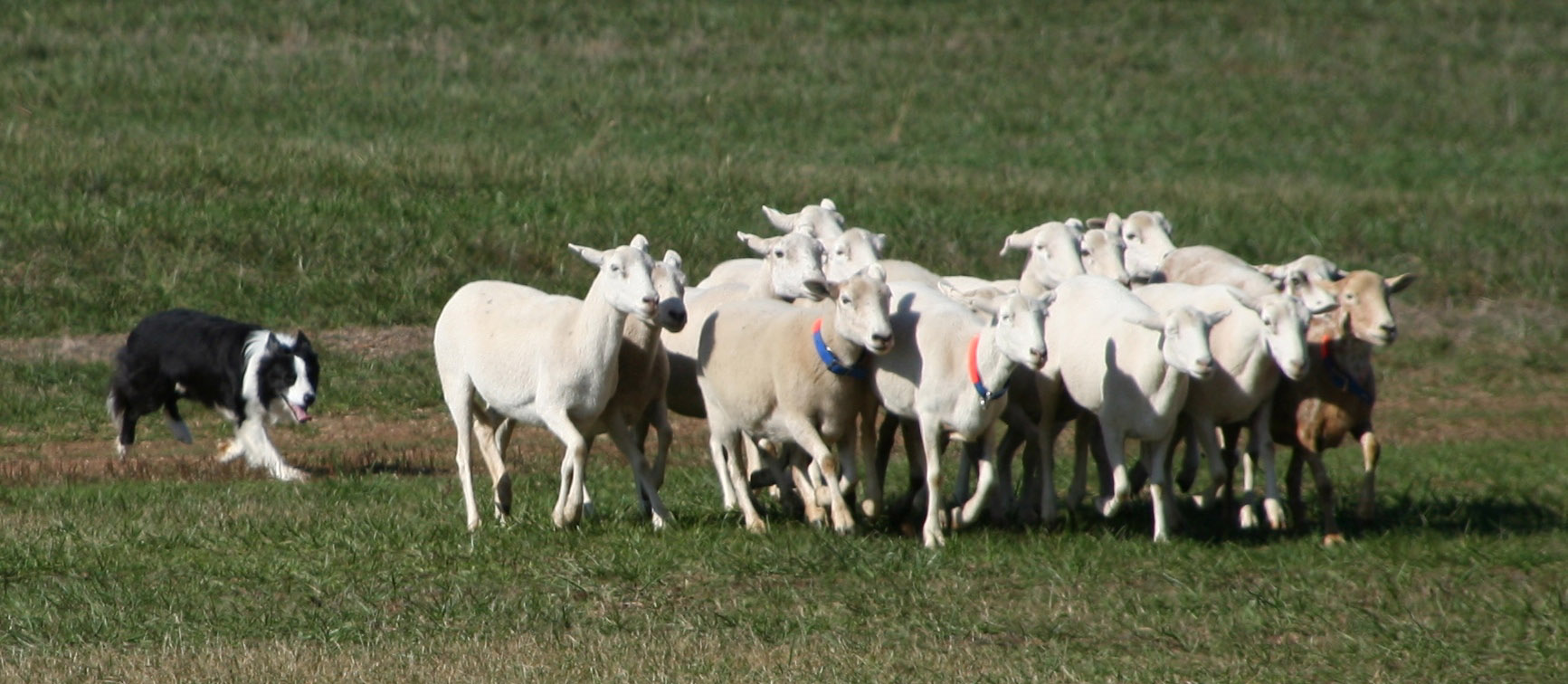
A Border Collie at the sheepdog trials at Rural Hill Farm in Huntersville, North Carolina

The International Sheep Dog Society (ISDS) organises trials of three levels of difficulty. Gathering style in herding is typical of the border collie breed, and until recently Australian kelpies were representing this style too, but got moved to traditional style in 2018. In gathering style the dog works under the guidance of a handler who is stationary during most of the programme. They handle the dog with verbal and gesture cues and uses a whistle.

The test usually involves the dog running out to the sheep (outrun), encouraging the sheep to move, or lifting (lift), driving the sheep towards the handler (fetch) and away from the handler (drive) through one or more gates or obstacles. In the designated area, the dog must separate one or more sheep from the flock (shed, single), place the sheep in the pen (pen).

The ISDS holds a World Championship once every three years. The eligibility of countries to participate and the number of participants from each country are determined based on the results of the regular competitions during qualifying period of three years. Individual and team competitions are held. For example, 238 participants from 29 countries were allowed to participate in the 2020 World Championship. A hybrid of Bluefaced Leicester and Scottish black-faced sheep were raised specifically for the event.

=== Traditional herding style ===
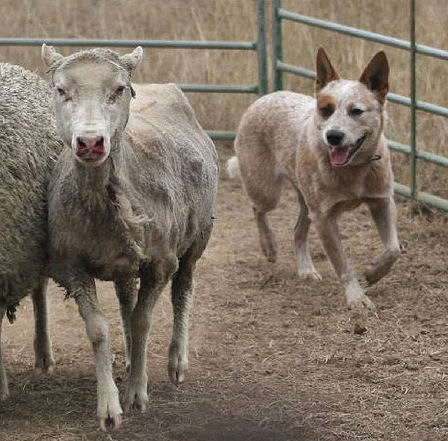
Australian Cattle Dog herding merino sheep at Cambden, NSW.

The International Cynological Federation in addition to gathering style (Border Collie) established the rules for trials, tests and competitions in the traditional herding style that includes all other breeds from pastoral group except border collies. In traditional style competitions the handler is allowed to move with the dog on the field during the entire programme, and the difficulty level is determined by a set of exercises. In addition to obstacles of varying complexity (bridge, "funnel", "Maltese cross") and work in a pen, crossing the carriageway, loading into a trailer, etc. can be asked of a dog.

Most popular breeds used for traditional style herding both in trials and every day farm work are the Pembroke Corgi, the Shetland Sheepdog, the Briard, the Australian Cattle Dog and Kelpie, the Smooth and Rough Collie and the Koolie.

There are separate rules for testing dogs for the presence of herding instinct. The testing does not reveal the winner, but assesses the dog's interest in sheep, the desire to work and the manner of interaction with the sheep, and the natural ability to find a balance point. Both traditional and gathering style dogs are eligible for this test in FCI.

== Trial field ==
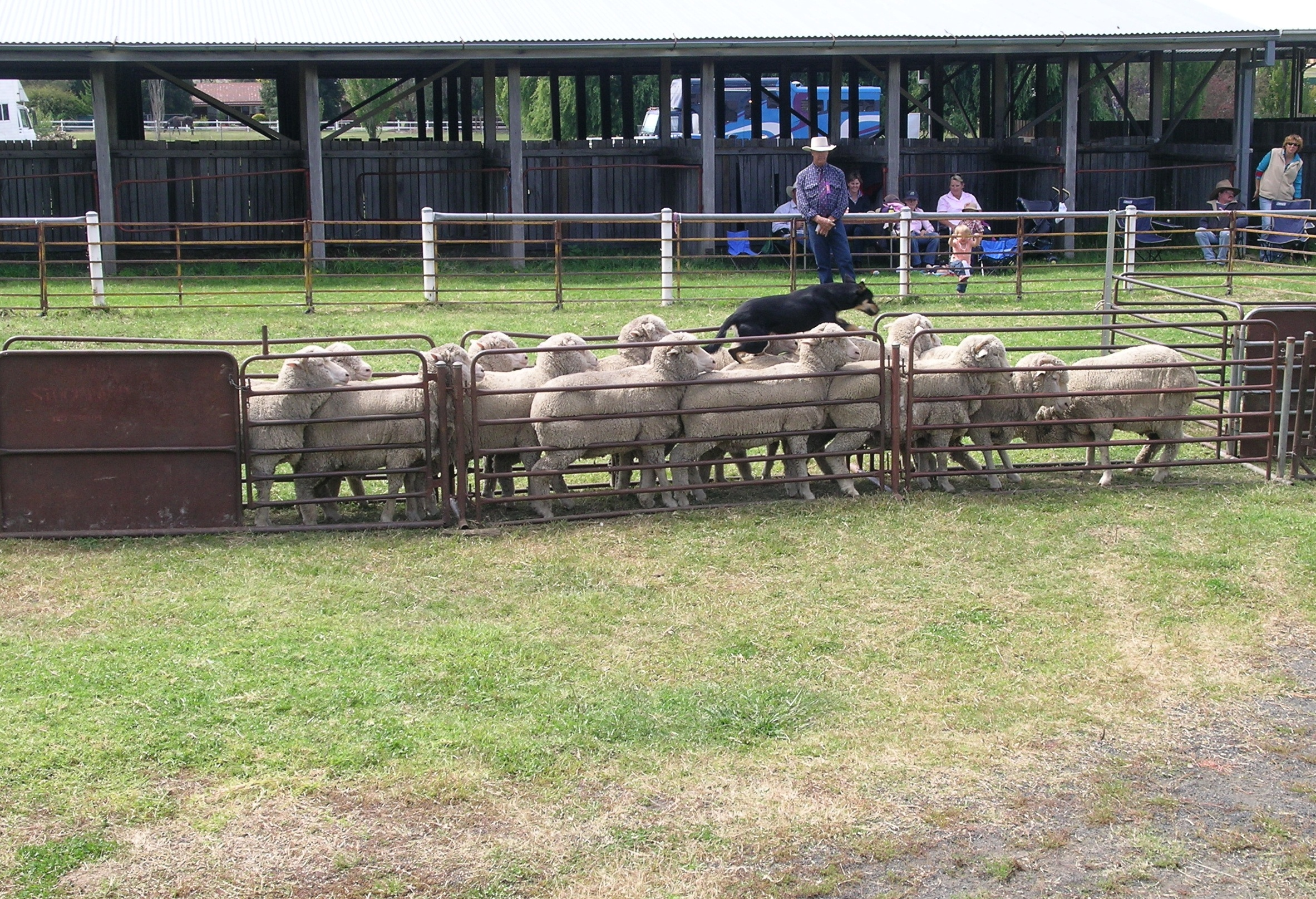
An Australian Kelpie running over the backs of sheep during a yard dog trial, Walcha, NSW

A popular version of a trial field

The exact layout of the trial field can vary significantly. Most experienced handlers agree that there are certain elements that are important to ensure that the challenge to the dog and handler is a fair and complete test. For USBCHA-sanctioned trials, these elements include:

- The dog must leave the handler and fetch sheep that are some distance away
- The dog must take control of the sheep and bring them to the handler
- It is against the dog's instinct to drive the sheep away from the handler so an away drive is a good test and should be included
- The dog and handler should be able to combine to move the sheep into a confined space, typically a pen but in some trials they are asked to load them onto a vehicle.

Other popular test elements that are often added include:

- The dog must separate the group into two groups in a controlled way in accordance with the instructions from the judge. This may involve some sheep being marked and the dog and handler working together to separate them from the rest or some variation of that. This is known as shedding and is almost always required to be done in a ring marked out on the ground.
- Singling is another test in which the dog and handler combine to separate one sheep from the group.
- Most trials include a cross drive where the dog is required to move the sheep in a controlled way in a straight line from one side of the field to the other in front of the handler but some distance away from them.

In addition there are various elements that may be added to increase the level of difficulty of a trial. One such example is the double lift where the dog is required to fetch one group of sheep, bring them to the handler, look back and find another group, somewhere else on the trial field some distance away. They must then leave the first group and do a second outrun to fetch the others and bring them to join the first group.

In most competitions the dog will be required to do the fetching and driving tests on their own. During these test elements the handler must remain at a stake positioned during the layout of the trial course. During the shedding, singling and penning the handler usually leaves the stake and works with the dog to achieve the task.

=== Scoring ===
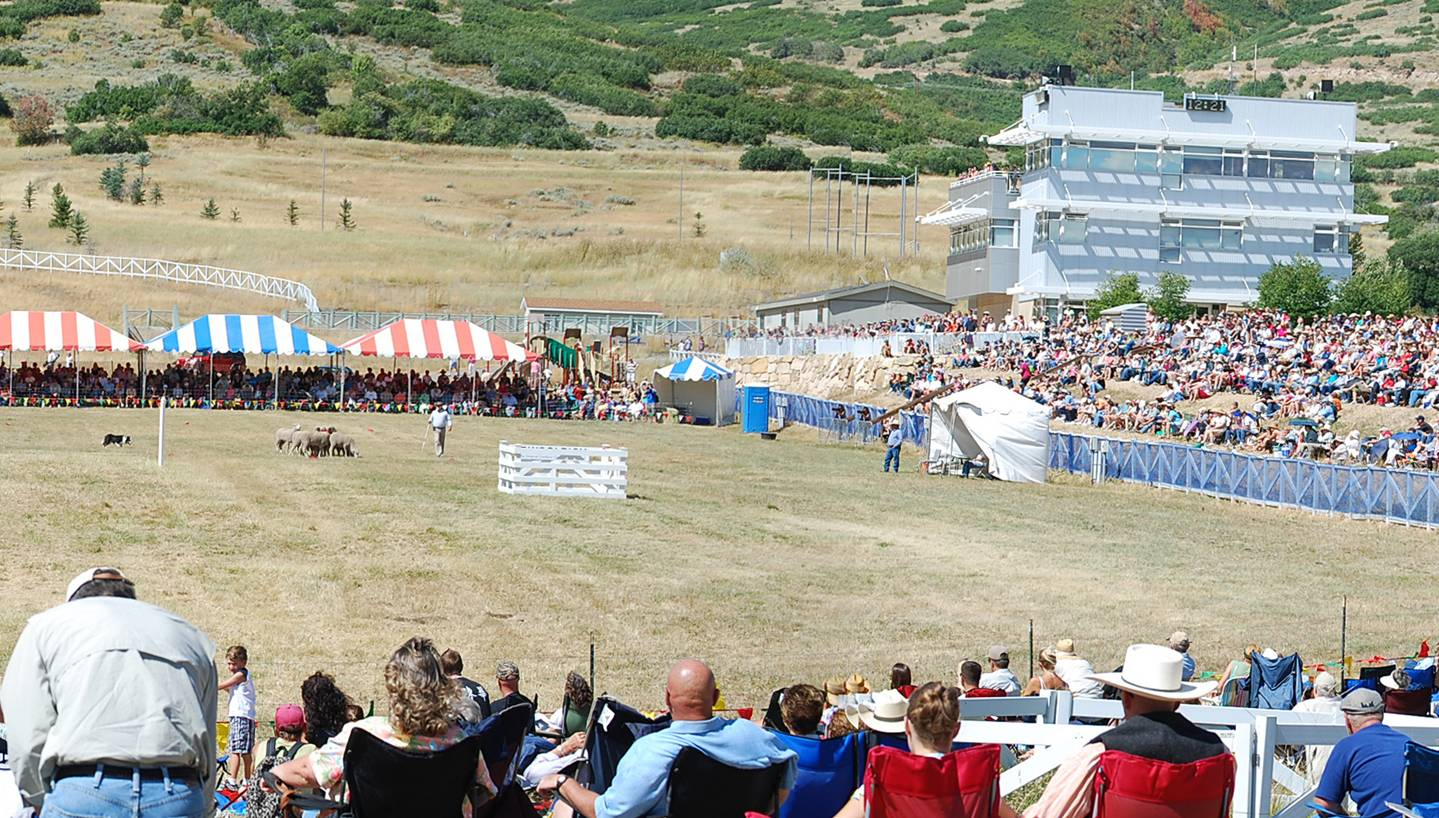
The Soldier Hollow Classic held annually in Midway, Utah, United States is the most attended annual sheepdog championship in the world. This 2009 event drew 24,600 spectators.

The most popular scoring system works as follows:

- A judge watches each run and assigns a score based on their judgment.
- Each test element is assigned a maximum score. For example there may be 10 points for the cast (outrun) and so on.
- Each competitor is assigned the full amount for each element before they start.
- As they negotiate each test element a judge deducts points for each fault. For example during a drive the judge may deduct points when the sheep move off line. During each element they can only lose as many points as are assigned to that element.
- They must negotiate each element in sequence before proceeding to the next.
- A set amount of time for the whole course, usually around 15 minutes, is decided on before the start of the trial.
- There is no advantage in completing the course in a short amount of time but if the competitor runs out of time then they will lose all the points for the element they were in the process of completing and all those that they have yet to attempt.
- The competitor's score is the sum of their score for all completed elements.

For most elements the judge focuses on the behaviour of the sheep not the dog or handler. Dogs are judged on the efficiency of their work and on qualities of good stockmanship. A dog that needlessly harasses or hurries the sheep will penalized and a dog that bites a sheep may be disqualified.

This points type of system has been in use since at least 1979 and may have been formalized at about that same time.

== See also ==
- Herding dog – the main article about sheepdogs
- Livestock guardian dog
- List of dog sports
- Championship (dog)
- Shepherd's whistle
- International Sheep Dog Society
- South African Sheepdog Association
