= Diabetes alert dog =

Assistance dog trained to monitor humans

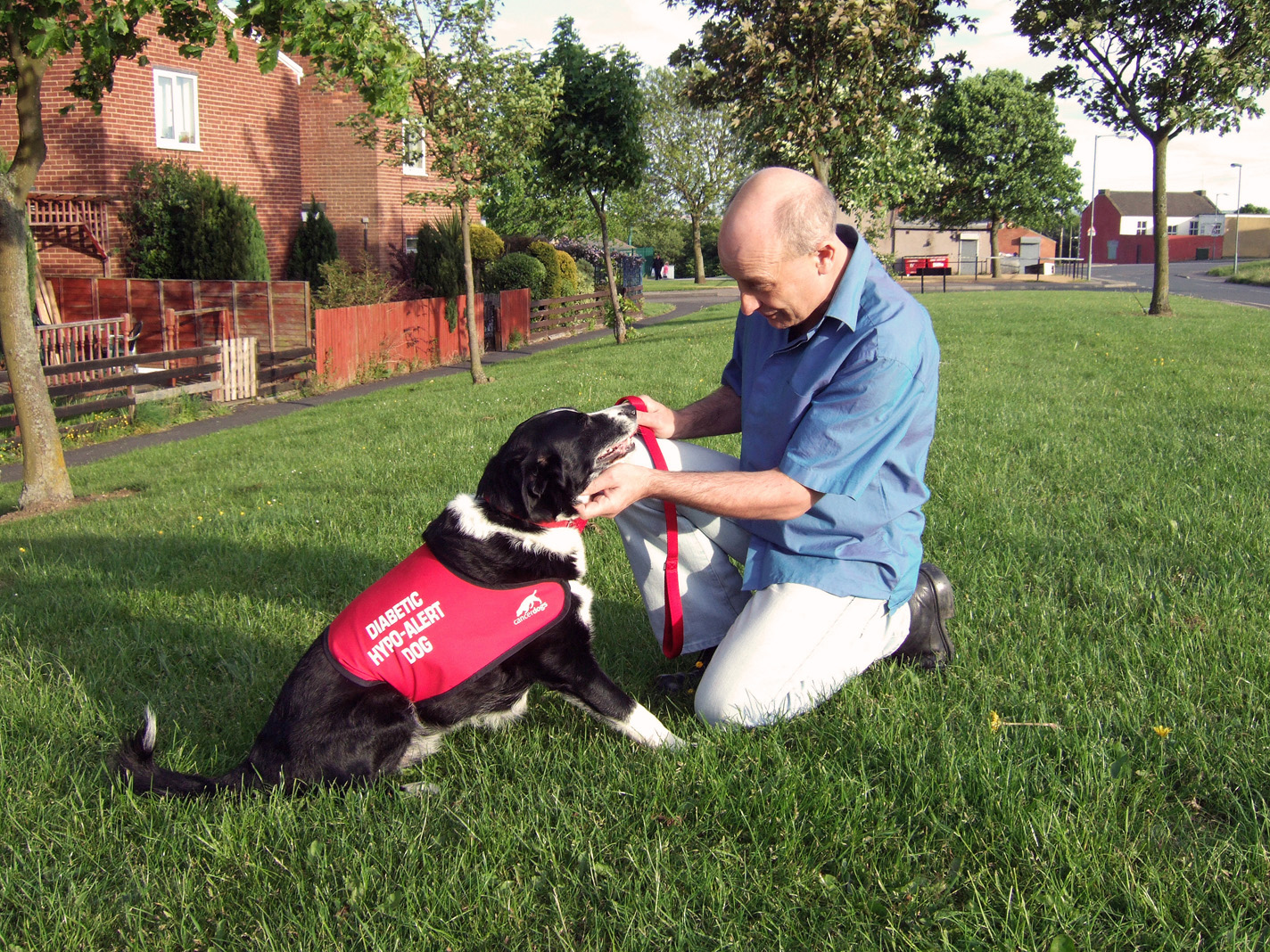
Diabetes detection dog Tinker, and his diabetic owner

A diabetic alert dog is an assistance dog trained to detect high (hyperglycemia) or low (hypoglycemia) levels of blood sugar in humans with diabetes and alert their owners to dangerous changes in blood glucose levels. This allows their owners to take steps to return their blood sugar to normal, such as using glucose tablets, sugar, and carbohydrate-rich food. The dog can prompt a human to take insulin.

When owners with diabetes begin to experience hypoglycemia, the detection dogs perform a predetermined task (e.g. bark, lay down, sit) to inform the person. Dogs may be directly smelling something related to the abnormal glucose concentration or may be reacting to the owner's symptoms which are caused by hypoglycemia, such as sweating or shaking.

== History ==
The first dog trained to detect hypoglycemia was a Californian dog called Armstrong in 2003. In 2009, a dog named Tinker from Durham City became the first self-taught British assistance dog to be officially registered for a type 2 diabetic owner. He was able to give his owner Paul Jackson up to half an hour warning before an attack occurred.

== Training ==
Diabetic alert dogs are trained to detect blood glucose changes using the saliva of diabetic patients. The diabetic person collects samples using gauze or dental cotton during a time when their blood sugar is just starting to get too low, or too high. Samples must be collected when the patient has not eaten within 30 minutes, brushed their teeth, or used anything with a strong smell such as mouthwash to get the strongest scent for diabetes alert. Once the samples are collected, they are frozen and used in training dogs to alert them to blood sugar changes.

== Reliability ==
Dog users were very satisfied with their dogs although tests of dogs showed low reliability. The reliability of the dogs ability to detect glycemic levels varies based on the training of the dog along with the breed of the dog for the conditions in which it will be working in.

== See also ==
- Assistance dog
- Autism service dog
- Emotional support animal
- Guide dog
- Hearing dog
- Medical response dog
- Mobility assistance dog
- Psychiatric service dog
- Seizure response dog
- Service animal
- Therapy dog
