= Emotional support animal =

Animal that provides psychological relief

An emotional support animal (ESA) is an animal that provides support to individuals with a mental health or psychiatric disability. Emotional support animals are not required to be trained. Any animal that provides support, comfort, or aid, to an individual through companionship, unconditional positive regard, and affection may be regarded as an emotional support animal.

In the United States, emotional support animals are not recognized as service animals under the Americans with Disabilities Act. Service animals are trained to perform specialized tasks such as helping a blind person navigate. People with mental health disabilities who possess an emotional support animal may be exempt from certain federal housing and travel rules. To receive these exemptions, the following requirements must be met: 1. the handler must meet the federal definition of disabled 2. the emotional support animal must help alleviate the symptoms or effects of the disability. The individual may need to present a letter from a certified healthcare provider, stating that the emotional support animal is needed for their mental health.

== Requirements ==
Emotional support animals are typically household domesticated animals, (Note: Common household animals include: dog, cat, small bird, rabbit, hamster, gerbil, other rodent, fish, turtle, or other small, domesticated animal. Barnyard animals and other non-domesticated animals are not considered common household animals and fall under the "unique animals" classification.) but may also be members of other animal species. (Note: Quote: "If the individual is requesting to keep a unique type of animal that is not commonly kept in households as described above, then the requestor has the substantial burden of demonstrating a disability-related therapeutic need for the specific animal or the specific type of animal.") There is no requirement under US federal law that an emotional support animal wear any identifying tag, patch, harness, or other identifying label.

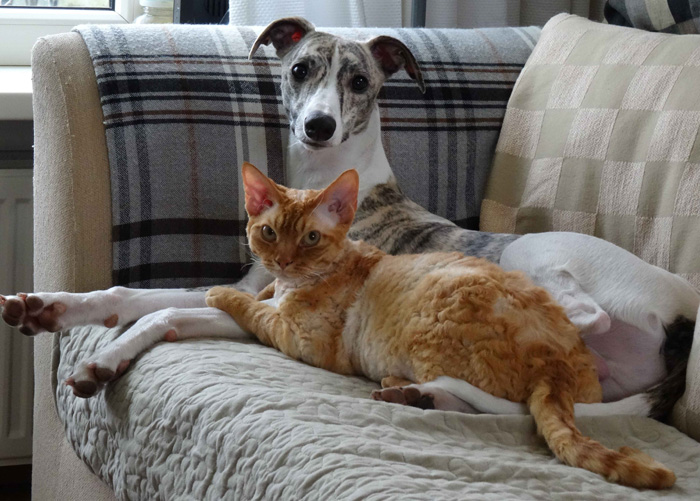
Emotional support animals do not need to have any special training.

There are no training requirements for emotional support animals, which typically have no training beyond what would be expected for the same type of animal. There is no requirement that they be individually trained to do work or perform tasks.

== Supporting evidence ==
Although most companion animals are pets as opposed to emotional support animals, research studies document a correlation between companion animals and the improvement of their owners' mental health.

A 2022 systematic review and meta-analysis of 35 articles regarding animal-assisted interventions (AAIS) conducted in higher educational settings reported overall lower levels of negative mental health outcomes with reductions in acute anxiety and stress (done by comparing intervention and control group). The authors do mention possible limitations within the study design regarding possible bias classified as "some concerns" and "high risk".

In 2020, the Assistance Dog Center, an assistance dog training service, and CertaPet, a company that connects potential clients with providers of animal-assisted therapy, announced the result of an online international survey of the owners of emotional assistance animals, obtaining responses from 298 people in relation to 307 ESA dogs. All participants reported that their quality of life had improved as a result of having an ESA dog, and almost all reported that having an ESA dog increased their feelings of security, independence, and energy, and helped improve their sleep.

A 2020 study, conducted in the UK through an online survey of almost 6,000 people, similarly found that almost 90% of people who had at least one companion animal during the COVID-19 pandemic described their animals as a source of considerable support, with that result being unaffected by the species of companion animal. The authors concluded that having a companion animal seemed to mitigate some of the negative psychological effects of the COVID-19 lockdown. Poorer mental health before the lockdown was associated with a stronger reported human-animal bond, and animal ownership was associated with smaller reported decreases in mental health and smaller increases in loneliness.

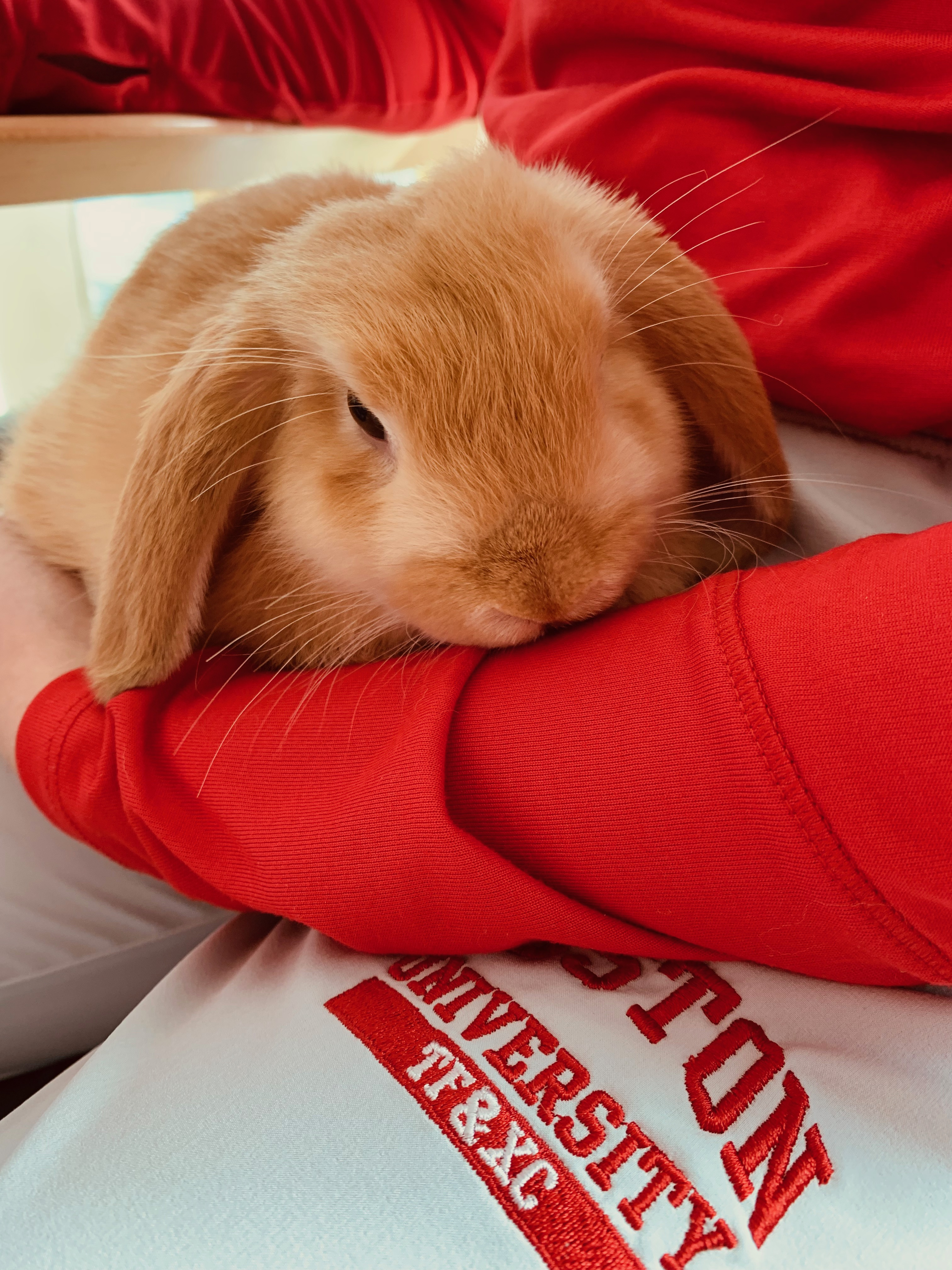
Emotional support animal comforting a college student

A 2018 review of 17 studies relating to companion animal ownership found that pets provide benefits to those with mental health conditions and that pets can be a source of calming support and companionship, as well as providing distraction and disruption from upsetting symptoms and experiences, and helping their owners maintain a positive identity and sense of self. The review found potential negative aspects of pet ownership, such as the significant distress associated with the loss of a pet. The authors recommended further rigorous research to test the apparent positive relationship between ownership of a companion animal and mental health.

A 2019 law review article summarized some of the research into the benefits of companion and emotional support animals, for example noting that interactions with companion animals can decrease blood pressure and mitigate some of the symptoms associated with dementia and Alzheimer's disease, and that animal-assisted classroom activities had been shown to improve the social skills of children with autism spectrum disorders.

== Worldwide ==
=== Canada ===
Emotional support animals are not considered service animals and are not protected under Canadian law.

Airlines operating in Canada may voluntarily allow passengers to bring emotional support animals on board, but without the legal protections extended to passengers with service animals. For example, before allowing an emotional support animal to board, an airline may require documentation from a licensed mental health professional stating that the animal is necessary for the individual's emotional support.

=== United Kingdom ===
There is no official legal recognition or public access rights for emotional support animals in the United Kingdom.

Although not legally required, the University of Winchester has an Assistance and Emotional Support Animal Policy that may provide exceptions to its no-pet policy for some assistance and emotional support animals. However, it is of note that most UK universities still prohibit and do not provide accommodations for emotional support animals.

=== United States ===
To qualify for an emotional support animal in the US, its owner must have an emotional or mental disability that is certified by a mental health professional such as a psychiatrist, psychologist, or other licensed mental health care provider. These may be invisible disabilities.

The owner's mental health impairment must be substantial enough to produce disability, rather than discomfort or a desire to have a pet. Furthermore, for the provider to certify the animal non-fraudulently, the emotional support animal's presence must provide a significant benefit that makes the difference between the person functioning adequately and not.

==== Regulation ====
===== ESA letters =====
An emotional support animal letter, or an ESA letter, is a document that qualifies people to be accompanied by a support animal in contexts in which pets might not be permitted, such as in rental housing. The letter must be issued by a psychologist, psychiatrist, qualified mental health professional, or physician. The professional who issues an ESA letter need not be the recipient's primary care physician, and some doctors may refer patients who are seeking an ESA to psychologists or other professionals.

===== Air travel =====
As of January 2021, airlines are not required to allow passengers to travel with ESAs, and they may treat ESAs as pets. Under current DOT rules, most airlines have decided to treat ESAs as pets.

Prior to 2021, a person with a disability was permitted to travel with a prescribed emotional support animal, so long as they presented appropriate documentation and the animal both was not a danger to others and did not engage in disruptive behavior. "Unusual" animals, including all snakes and other reptiles, were legally allowed to be refused.

===== Multiple ESAs =====
Although the issue has not been addressed by the courts, a person's request for accommodation of multiple ESAs would follow the same legal framework as any other request. Thus, if a person with a disability claims a need for multiple emotional support animals, that person will need documentation supporting this claim from their psychologist or other licensed healthcare professional. The practitioner will need to provide documentation that each support animal alleviates some symptom of the disability.

==== Federal law ====
In the US, legal protection against housing discrimination is afforded to people with mental disabilities under two federal statutes: Section 504 of the Rehabilitation Act of 1973 and the Federal Fair Housing Amendments Act (FHAA) of 1988. These statutes, and the corresponding case law, create the general rule that a landlord cannot discriminate against people with mental disabilities in housing, and if a reasonable accommodation will enable a person living with a disability to equally enjoy and use the rental unit, the landlord must provide the accommodation. Persons with disabilities may request a reasonable accommodation, such as a waiver of a "no pets policy", for any assistance animal, including an emotional support animal, under both the Fair Housing Act and Section 504.

===== Section 504 of the Rehabilitation Act =====
Section 504 of the Rehabilitation Act was enacted in 1973 and made broad and sweeping statements that discrimination against the disabled in any program receiving federal financial assistance was illegal. However, it was not until 1988 when the US Department of Housing and Urban Development (HUD) created regulations under the statute. Section 504 states:

No otherwise qualified individual with a disability in the United States ... shall, solely by reason of her or his disability, be excluded from the participation in, be denied the benefits of, or be subjected to discrimination under any program or activity receiving federal financial assistance.

In the context of housing discrimination, this statute creates the rule that public housing authorities cannot deny housing to a person with a disability solely because of his or her disability, and that if a reasonable accommodation can be made to make housing available to a person with a disability, the landlord is required to make the accommodation. Even though the statute does not expressly use the phrase "reasonable accommodation", it has been read into the statute by case law and HUD regulations interpreting the statute.

To establish that a "no pets" waiver for an emotional support animal is a reasonable accommodation under Section 504, the tenant must: have a disability, be "otherwise qualified" to receive the benefit, be denied the benefit solely because of the disability, and the housing authority must receive federal financial assistance. Courts have held that "otherwise qualified" means that the tenant must be able to meet the requirements of the program in spite of the handicap. Also, the tenant must be able to meet the general rules of tenancy, such as cleaning up after the animal and walking the animal in designated areas.

The Majors and Whittier Terrace courts established the foundational principles that a tenant can be "otherwise qualified" under Section 504 despite an inability to comply with a "no pets" policy, and that a waiver of a "no pets" policy can be a reasonable accommodation under Section 504. However, several courts have held that a tenant requesting an emotional support animal as a reasonable accommodation must demonstrate a relationship between his or her ability to function and the companionship of the animal. (Note: See Majors v. Housing Authority of the County of Dekalb (5th Cir. 1981), Housing Authority of the City of New London v. Tarrant, (Conn. Super. Ct. Jan. 14, 1997), Whittier Terrace v. Hampshire (Mass. App. Ct. 1989), Durkee v. Staszak (N.Y.App.Div. 1996), Crossroads Apartments v. LeBoo (City Court of Rochester, N.Y. 1991).) This required nexus between the disability and the emotional support animal has been refined by several courts. For instance, in Janush v. Charities Housing Development Corp (N.D. Ca., 2000), the US Northern District Court of California held the reasonable accommodation is a fact-based, and not species-based, issue. In Nason v. Stone Hill Realty Association (1996), a Massachusetts trial court recognized that there were more reasonable accommodations to lessen the effects of a person's disability, other than keeping an emotional support animal, and therefore denied the tenant's motion for preliminary injunction. Courts have held the emotional distress expected to occur if a person is forced to give up his or her emotional support animal will not support a reasonable accommodation claim.

Since a violation of Section 504 requires the housing authority to receive federal funding, this act did not cover private housing providers. This legislative gap existed until 1988 when Congress passed the Fair Housing Act Amendments.

===== Fair Housing Act =====
Whereas only housing authorities receiving federal financial assistance are subject to Section 504, both public and private housing authorities are subject to the provisions of the Fair Housing Act. Enacted as part of the Civil Rights Act of 1968 legislation, the Fair Housing Act (FHA) focused on housing discrimination on the basis of race, color, national origin, or gender; in 1988 (Title VIII), however, the Federal Fair Housing Act Amendments (FHAA) expanded this scope to include protection for people with disabilities for all types of housing, not jst federally funded housing. The FHAA states that it is unlawful "to discriminate in the sale or rental ... of a dwelling to any buyer or renter because of a handicap of that buyer or renter, a person residing in or intending to reside in that dwelling after it is so sold, rented, or made available, or any person associated with that buyer or renter." Further, it is discrimination for any person to: "refuse to make reasonable accommodations in rules, policies, practices, or services, when such accommodations may be necessary to afford a handicapped person equal opportunity to use and enjoy a dwelling unit, including public and common use areas." Thus, like Section 504, the FHAA requires landlords to make reasonable accommodations for tenants.

Additionally, the FHAA, in section 3602(h) defines handicap, with respect to a person, as:

1. a physical or mental impairment which substantially limits one or more of such person's major life activities;
2. a record of having such an impairment; or
3. being regarded as having such an impairment.

The term "major life activities" has been interpreted broadly to include those "activities that are of central importance to daily life," such as "seeing, hearing, walking, breathing, performing manual tasks, caring for one's self, learning, speaking, and reproducing." The United States Department of Housing and Urban Development (HUD) is responsible for administering the FHAA; the Attorney General and private individuals may enforce it.

To establish a prima facie case of housing discrimination under the FHAA: the tenant must have a qualifying disability, the landlord knew of the handicap or should reasonably be expected to know of it, accommodation of the handicap may be necessary to afford the tenant an equal opportunity to use and enjoy the dwelling, and the landlord must deny the request, such as refusing to waive the "no pets" policy.

The second element, that the landlord knew of the handicap or should have known of it, places an affirmative burden on the tenant to request the reasonable accommodation, such as a waiver of a "no pets" policy for an emotional support animal. A tenant wishing to obtain a waiver of a "no pets" policy for an emotional support animal may meet this burden by providing a letter from his or her physician or mental health professional: stating that the tenant has a mental disability, explaining that the animal is needed to lessen the effects of the disability, and requesting that the animal be allowed in the rental unit as a reasonable accommodation for the disability. Landlords are entitled to ask for supporting materials which document the need for an emotional support animal. Mere emotional distress that would result from having to give up an animal because of a "no pets" policy will not qualify under federal law. Instead, there must be a link, or a nexus, between the animal and the disability. The nexus between the animal and the disability is analyzed under the third element of an FHAA housing discrimination case, known as the necessity requirement, and requires that the accommodation will affirmatively enhance a disabled tenant's quality of life by ameliorating the effects of the disability. So long as the requested accommodation does not constitute an undue financial or administrative burden for the landlord, or fundamentally alter the nature of the housing, the landlord must provide the accommodation.

Although the Fair Housing Act covers both multi- and single-family detached home, the sale or rental of a single-family dwelling by an owner is exempt from the statute. There are two exceptions to this exemption, however. One is that the exception will not apply if the private individual owner owns more than three single-family homes. The other exception to this exemption is the use of a real estate agent or a broker to rent out the home.

A tenant may be awarded actual and punitive damages, injunctions, and attorney fees at the discretion of the court for a landlord's violation of the FHAA.

In most cases, landlords do grant ESAs the same reasonable housing accommodations as service animals, there have been instances where they do not. There are some court cases, such as the Kenna Homes case in West Virginia, where the court has said it is not a violation of Fair Housing rules for a landlord to require an assistance animal to have some form of training.

====== Landlords ======
Many landlords have "no pets" policies for their rental properties, and many landlords who allow pets impose restrictions on the type and size of pets that tenants are allowed to bring into the rental property. Many landlords are reluctant to waive their pet policies and restrictions, even when requested by a tenant who is requesting accommodation of a mental or emotional disability. Nonetheless, most landlords may not legally reject a tenant who has documented qualification for an emotional support animal, nor may a landlord charge any form of pet fee to that tenant.

As part of any determination that excludes an emotional support animal from a residential rental property, a landlord must perform an individualized assessment of the specific animal to determine if it poses a direct threat to safety or would cause substantial property damage. An emotional support animal may not be excluded solely based upon breed or species.

Landlords may be concerned that waiving a "no pet" policy for one tenant will inspire many others to claim mental illnesses and the need for emotional support animals. Landlords may believe that as more tenants have animals on the property, odors and noises from the animals may deter other tenants from renting and thus lower the value of the rental property. Landlords may also believe that making exceptions to a "no pets" policy for a tenant's emotional support animal may confuse other tenants who do not understand why one person was allowed an animal while they were not. However, if a tenant documents the need for an emotional support animal under the Fair Housing act or state law, and the landlord is not exempt from those laws, the landlord must allow the tenant to possess an emotional support animal. The FHA does not have a conclusive definition of what type of animal an assistance or companion animal must be, plus the animal does not need to be trained to perform any specific task to be considered an emotional support or companion animal. This means dogs, cats, birds, and other types of companion animals can be considered use for emotional support.

====== Pet deposits ======
The US Department of Housing and Urban Development and Department of Justice have held that "providers may not require persons with disabilities to pay extra fees or deposits as a condition of receiving a reasonable accommodation." In 1990, a HUD administrative judge enjoined owners of an apartment complex from charging a person with a disability a pet deposit fee. The judge held that an auxiliary aid, like a service, guide, or signal dog, may be necessary to afford the individual an equal opportunity to use and enjoy the dwelling unit, including public and common areas. Accordingly, when a tenant qualifies for a service animal or emotional support animal, a landlord may not charge the tenant additional fees in association with the presence of the animal in the rental property. This prohibition extends to pet deposits and fees, even when those fees are charged to other tenants who have pets.

A landlord may charge a tenant for damage caused to a rental property by the tenant's emotional support animal, and may deduct the cost of repairs from the tenant's security deposit, but may not increase the security deposit based upon the tenant's possession of an emotional support animal.

====== Exceptions ======
Exceptions may apply to a landlord's obligation to allow a tenant to possess an emotional support animal. For example, owner-occupied buildings with four or fewer rental units are exempt from the federal Fair Housing Act. The Fair Housing Act also exempts private owners of single-family housing sold or rented without the use of a broker, as long as the owner does not own more than three single-family homes, as well as housing operated by organizations and private clubs that restrict occupancy to members. Exemptions under state law may be more restrictive than federal exemptions.

Even when the Fair Housing Act applies, circumstances may arise under which a landlord may restrict a tenant from possessing an emotional support animal.

- If a tenant's emotional support animal compromises the safety of other tenants or their property, or if the animal poses a danger to other tenants, the landlord may not have to allow the tenant in the housing or waive a "no pets" policy.
- If the tenant becomes unable to properly care for his or her emotional support animal, the landlord may be able to restrict the tenant's continuing possession of the animal.
- If a tenant is neglecting his or her emotional support animal and the neglect rises to a level where the animal is endangered, then there may be a basis for action by the police or animal control. If any animal is being neglected, local law enforcement or animal control can intervene.
- If other more reasonable alternatives exist to lessen the effects of the disability and the tenant has not provided proper documentation of an emotional support animal, the landlord may not have to waive a "no pets" policy as an accommodation of the tenant's disability.
- Even if entitled to possess an emotional support animal, a tenant remains subject to all the other provisions of the lease, including any requirement to maintain his or her residence in a sanitary manner. A landlord may also evict a person with a disability if that person does not comply with legitimate tenancy rules that apply to all tenants.

If the requested accommodation (i.e., the waiver of a "no pets" policy for an emotional support animal) constitutes an undue financial or administrative burden for the landlord, or fundamentally alters the nature of the housing, the landlord may not have to provide the reasonable accommodation. However, as the burden of allowing emotional support animals is generally modest, most landlords have been unsuccessful in opposing a waiver of a "no pets" policy on the basis of a claimed extreme burden.

====== Colleges ======
On April 25, 2013, the US Department of Housing and Urban Development sent notice to its regional offices that public universities are required to comply with the Fair Housing Act, which includes allowing emotional support animals into college dormitories and residence halls. As an example of compliance, California Polytechnic State University permits emotional support animals in on-campus housing following verification of eligibility. Verification involves submitting an accommodation request for review, a written request for an accommodation, and sufficient documentation from the applicant's treating licensed medical professional. Emotional support animals are not generally permitted in other campus facilities.

While a number of institutions traditionally held a "no pets" policy, students with ESAs assert that an animal provides them therapeutic benefit. Some professors have expressed concern that animals in classrooms and academic settings will cause classroom distraction.

===== Americans with Disabilities Act =====
The Americans with Disabilities Act of 1990 (ADA) allows people with disabilities to bring their service animals in public places. However, the ADA only extends these protections to dogs that have been "individually trained" to "perform tasks for the benefit of an individual with a disability," which is the definition of service animals under 28 C.F.R. § 36.104. Since emotional support animals are typically not trained for an individual's specific disability and since emotional support animals might not be dogs, they do not receive the protections of the ADA. A public place can therefore deny admission to an emotional support animal.

In situations where the ADA and the FHAA/Section 504 apply simultaneously (e.g., a public housing agency, sales or leasing offices, or housing associated with a university or other place of education), housing providers must meet their obligations under both the reasonable accommodation standard of the FHAct/Section 504 and the service animal provisions of the ADA. (Note: In 2011 the Department of Justice published revised final regulations implementing the Americans with Disabilities Act (ADA) for title II (State and local government services) and title III (public accommodations and commercial facilities) on September 15, 2010, in the Federal Register. "The DOJ's new rules limit the definition of "service animal" in the ADA to include only dogs. The new rules also define "service animal" to exclude emotional support animals. This definition, however, does not apply to the FHAct Section 504. Disabled individuals may request a reasonable accommodation for assistance animals in addition to dogs, including emotional support animals, under the FHAct or Section 504. In situations where both laws apply, housing providers must meet the broader FHAct/Section 504 standard in deciding whether to grant reasonable accommodation requests.")

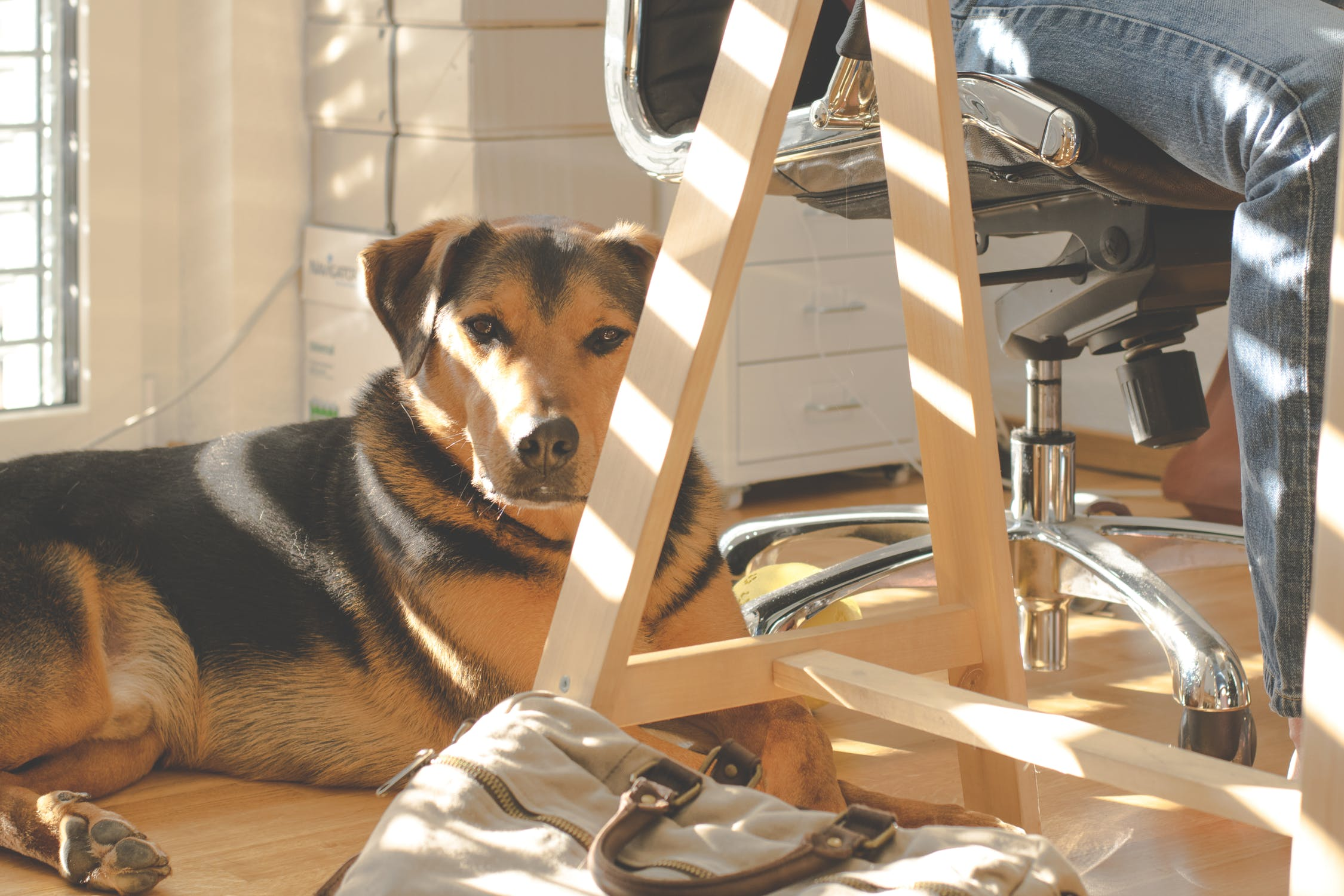
ESA in the workplace

Current ADA rules require employers not to discriminate on the grounds of a disability. Employers are required to accommodate service animals brought on the job with their owner. Legal requirements for ESAs in the workplace are not settled. At present, a person can have their ESA at work as long as they can provide documentation supporting the need and it is deemed a "reasonable accommodation" under the ADA.

The lack of training for emotional support animals has led to litigation. For example, there is controversy over whether the ADA definition of service animal, with its requirement of training, applies to reasonable accommodation claims for animals under the FHAA. However, HUD administrative judges have ruled in favor of emotional support animals, despite their lack of training, as being reasonable accommodations. (Note: See HUD v. Dutra, 1996 WL 657690 and HUD v. Riverbay Corporation, 1994 WL 497536.) Additionally, several courts have also ruled that untrained assistance animals are reasonable accommodations under the FHAA. (Note: See Overlook Mutual Homes, Inc. v. Spencer (S.D. Ohio 2009), Bronk v. Ineichen (7th Cir. 1995), Fair Housing of the Dakotas, Inc. v. Goldmark Property Management, Inc. (D.N.D. 2011) (this case acknowledges that some courts use the ADA definition of service animals to apply to animals under the FHAA).) Yet, there are cases that have held an assistance animal, in order to be considered a reasonable accommodation under the FHAA, must be trained. (Note: See "In re Kenna Homes Co-op. Corp." (2001), Prindable v. Association of Apartment Owners of 2987 Kalakaua (D. Haw. 2003), Assenberg v. Anacortes Housing Authority (W.D. Wash. 2006).)

Under U.S. law, only service animals must be allowed access to health care facilities. The grant of access for therapy animals and ESAs thus reflects a considered decision by the healthcare provider in relation to patient care, as opposed to a legal mandate.

==== State law ====
In some US states, providing a letter, registry, or certificate to a person who is not disabled is a crime. Many states have made it a criminal misdemeanor to make false claims stating that their animal is an assistance animal or to say they are a handler training an assistance animal. States that have passed laws criminalizing the misrepresentation of service and assistance animals include Alabama, Arizona, California, Colorado, Florida, Idaho, Iowa, Kansas, Maine, Michigan, Minnesota, Missouri, Nebraska, Nevada, New Hampshire, New Jersey, New Mexico, New York, North Carolina, Texas, Utah, Virginia, and Washington State.

== Controversy ==
Controversies include the behavior of some animals, harm to other people, the problem of widespread fraud, and the scientific inquiry about the benefit of emotional support animals.

The rise of ESAs over the past decade has sparked controversy since animal owners receive ESA certifications from internet sites with little or no psychiatric evaluation, fueling fraudulent ESA claims by airline passengers and tenants. The presence of animals in these spaces poses risks to passengers and neighbors, such as allergic reactions, animal bites, hygiene issues, or emotional distress for those with a cultural or physical aversion to animals. Both poorly trained emotional support animals and poorly trained pets that are being fraudulently passed off as emotional support animals represent a threat to the health, safety, and function of both people and trained service animals.

Emotional support animals may behave differently from trained assistance animals. For instance, due to the lack of training, an emotional support animal may bark or sniff at other people, whereas service dogs are trained not to do so.

People with unique disabilities (invisible disability), such as allergy to animal dander, have had allergic attacks triggered by emotional support animals.

There is also a concern about people fraudulently acquiring emotional support animals though they are legally not considered disabled. According to one survey, Americans generally believe that a majority of emotional support animals serve a legitimate need, but the more experience the respondents had with service animals and emotional support animals, the more aware they were of fraud. The prevalence of fraud, and the rising popularity of emotional support animals, has increased the number of animals in public places where animals are normally not allowed.

Historically, some airline passengers misrepresented their animals as ESAs in order to be allowed to bring them onboard. There were incidents of injury to passengers and airline employees, caused by emotional support dogs.

== See also ==
- Pet – Animal kept for companionship rather than utility
  - Companion dog – Dog intended as a human companion
- Service animal – Animal to assist people with disabilities
  - Assistance dog – Working dog trained to aid or assist an individual with a disability
    - Autism service dog – Type of service dog
    - Guide dog – Assistance dog trained to lead visually impaired around obstacles
    - Hearing dog – Type of assistance dog trained to listen for sounds
    - Medical response dog – Type of service dog
    - Mobility assistance dog – Type of service dog
    - Psychiatric service dog – Type of service dog
    - School dog – Use of dogs in educational settings to support wellbeing and learning
    - Seizure response dog – Assists person during or immediately before or after a seizure
  - Guide horse – Equine service animal assisting blind persons
- Animal-assisted therapy – Alternative or complementary type of therapy
- Therapy cat
- Therapy dog – Dog with specific therapy training
