= Service animal =

Animal to assist people with disabilities

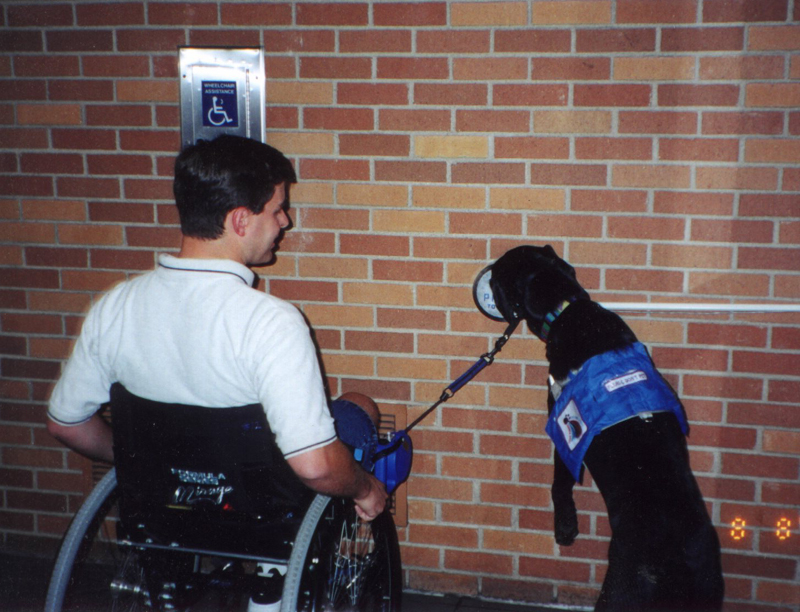
This service dog has been trained to press a button to open an electric door for his wheelchair-using owner.

Service animals are working animals that have been trained to perform tasks that assist disabled people. Service animals may also be referred to as assistance animals or helper animals depending on the country and the animal's function. Dogs are the most common service animals, having assisted people since around 1927.

Various definitions exist for a service animal. Various laws and policies may define service animal more expansively, but they often do not include or specially accommodate emotional support animals, comfort animals, or therapy dogs.

Regulations regarding service animals vary by region. For example, in Japan, regulations outline standards of training and certification for service animals. In the United States, only dogs are recognized as service animals; they are generally allowed in areas of public accommodation, even where pets are otherwise forbidden.

== Definitions ==
A service animal is an animal that has been trained to assist a disabled person. The animal needs to be individually trained to do tasks that directly relate to the handler's disability, which goes beyond the ordinary training that a pet receives and the non-individualized training that a therapy dog receives.

The international assistance animal community has categorized three types of assistance animals:

- Guide animals, which guide the blind;
- Hearing animals, which signal the hearing impaired; and
- Service animals, which do work for persons with disabilities other than blindness or deafness.

In the United States, the term service animal encompasses all three of the above types (guide dog, hearing animal, service dog). The Americans with Disabilities Act defines the term as "dogs that are individually trained to do work or perform tasks for people with disabilities". Additionally, the Air Carrier Access Act breaks down the term service animal into emotional support animals and other service animals.

== Roles of a service animal ==
The people that can qualify for a service animal can have a range of physical and/or mental disabilities.

A guide animal is an animal specifically trained to assist a visually impaired person to navigate in public. These animals may be trained to open doors, recognize traffic signals, guide their owners safely across public streets, and navigate through crowds of people. A mobility animal may perform similar services for a person with physical disabilities, as well as assisting with balance or falling issues, or fetching dropped or needed items. Some of them are trained to pull wheelchairs. Hearing animals are trained to assist hearing-impaired or deaf persons. These animals may be trained to respond to doorbells or a ringing phone or to tug their owners toward a person who is speaking to them. Psychiatric animals can be trained to provide deep-pressure therapy by lying on top of a person who may be experiencing PTSD flashbacks, overstimulation, or acute anxiety. They may be trained to interrupt harmful behaviors (e.g., skin picking). Similarly, autism animals have been recently introduced to recognize and respond to the needs of people with autism spectrum disorder; some persons with ASD state that they are more comfortable interacting with animals than with human caregivers due to issues regarding eye contact, touch, and socialization. Medical emergency animals can assist in medical emergency and perform such services as clearing an area in the event of a seizure, fetching medication or other necessary items, or alerting others in the event of a medical episode; some may even be trained to call emergency services through use of a telephone with specially designed oversized buttons. Service animals may also be trained to alert persons to the presence of an allergen.

=== Difference from emotional support animals and pets ===
Service animals also provide companionship and emotional support for owners who might otherwise be isolated due to disability; however, providing companionship and emotional support is not a trained task that qualifies an animal as a service animal.

In some places, including most of the US, claiming that an emotional support animal or a pet is a service animal is illegal.

=== Limitations ===
Service animals should not be taken into every place, especially if there are bona fide safety issues. Some activities may be unsafe for the dog (e.g., a roller coaster, which will not have appropriate safety belts for the dog), and, in other situations, the dog's presence may cause a safety problem (e.g., by introducing contaminants into a sterile room in a hospital, or if the combined weight of the dog and its handler exceeds the weight limits for a piece of equipment).

Even if service animals in general are accepted, an individual service animal could be excluded because of its own behavior or situation. For example, in the US, individual service dogs have legally been excluded from some places for not being properly controlled by its handler (e.g., for growling at staff or interfering with other patrons), because the handler was unable to care for it (e.g., while the handler was unable to take the dog out to urinate for an extended period of time), for having a contagious disease, and for urinating or defecating in inappropriate places.

In some places, service animals in training have the same rights to enter a place as a fully trained and working service animal, and in other places, they do not.

== Acquisition ==
Service animals may be acquired from an organization that trains them, or may be purchased as a puppy (e.g., from a dog breeder) and then trained later. Assistance Dogs International and Animal Assisted Intervention International organize international networks of service dog non-profits.

Trained service animals tend to be expensive, with costs running into the tens of thousands of dollars. In some cases, even though money is paid, the service animal is not being bought by the user, but merely leased.

== Training ==
Training a service dog may take two years. The training is intensive; 120 hours of training over six months (about five hours per week) is considered a minimal level of training.

The training for a service dog is more individualized than the training for a therapy dog, because the service dog supports only a single individual, and therapy dogs work with a variety of people.

The training may be done by a non-profit organization, by an individual or small business, or by the owner. For legal recognition, some countries require licensed trainers. For example, service animals in Japan are only legally recognized if they are certified by designated agencies.

== Access by region ==
In many countries, guide dogs, other types of assistance dogs, and in some cases miniature horses, are protected by law, and therefore may accompany their handlers in most places that are open to the public, even if local regulations or rules would deny access to non-service animals. Laws and regulations vary by jurisdiction.

=== Japan ===
In Japan, the Act on Assistance Dogs for Physically Disabled Persons was issued in 2002. The stated goal of this act was to improve the quality of "assistance dogs for physically disabled persons" and expand the use of public facilities by physically disabled people.

Assistance dogs are classified as either guide dogs, hearing dogs, or service dogs. Public transportation, public facilities, offices of public organisation, and private businesses of 50 or more people are required to accept certified assistance dogs. Only certified assistance dogs are required to be accommodated. They must display a sign with their certification number, and the dog's health records and proof of certification must be provided upon demand. Private housing and private businesses with less than 50 people are encouraged but not required to accept assistance dogs.

Visitors whose assistance animals were self-trained or trained by an organization not approved by the Japanese government are legally considered ordinary pets while in Japan.

=== United States ===
In the United States, the Americans with Disabilities Act of 1990 prohibits any business, government agency, or other organization that provides access to the general public from barring service dogs. However, religious organizations are not required to provide such access. Current federal regulations define service animal for ADA purposes to exclude all species of animals other than domestic dogs and miniature horses.

Other laws also apply. The US Air Carrier Access Act permits trained service animals to travel with disabled people on commercial airplanes. Under current regulations, airlines may require a completed DOT Service Animal Air Transportation Form attesting to the service animal's health, behaviour, training, and (for long flights) capacity to relieve itself or remain sanitary.

The Fair Housing Act requires housing providers to permit service animals as well as comfort animals and emotional support animals, without species restrictions, in housing.

The revised Americans with Disabilities Act requirements are as follows: "Beginning on March 15, 2011, only dogs are recognized as service animals under titles II and III of the ADA. A service animal is a dog that is individually trained to do work or perform tasks for a person with a disability. Generally, title II and title III entities must permit service animals to accompany people with disabilities in all areas where members of the public are allowed to go."

While only dogs are recognized as service animals, the Department's revised ADA regulations have a new, separate provision about miniature horses that have been individually trained to do work or perform tasks for people with disabilities. Entities covered by the ADA must modify their policies to permit miniature horses where reasonable.

The ADA states that a service animal may be removed from the premises if the dog is out of control of the handler or the dog is not housebroken. Service animals are to be kept under control by wearing a leash, harness, or tether unless it would interfere with the animal's ability to perform its tasks. Housebroken means the service animal is to be adequately trained to urinate and defecate in appropriate places (e.g., outdoors or being paper trained).

However, businesses may exclude service animals when the animals' presence or behavior "fundamentally alters" the nature of the goods, services, programs, or activities provided to the public. This could include exclusion from certain areas of zoos where a dog's presence could disrupt the animals' behavior or where there is open access to the animals, or if a service dog's alert behavior is barking, its behavior could be considered fundamentally altering the service provided by a movie theater. In a medical setting, service animals are normally permitted in patient exam rooms but excluded from operating rooms and other sterile environments.

Staff are legally allowed to ask the following questions about service animals: (1) "Is the dog a service animal required because of a disability?" and (2) "What work or task has this animal been trained to perform?" Staff cannot request documentation, ask about the handler's disability, or require the animal to perform its tasks.

Other rules relating to service dogs outlined by the ADA:

- Staff can neither deny service for reasons such as allergies or fear of dogs nor deny service for people with allergies or psychiatric conditions for reasons of a service dog being present; instead, all disabled people need to be accommodated (for example, by having the allergic person use a different room from the person with a service dog).
- Staff cannot charge handlers extra fees because of a service animal.
- Hotels must provide handlers the ability to reserve any room, not just rooms deemed "pet-friendly".
- Staff are not responsible for supervising a service animal.
- Dog may be of any breed, though certain breeds, such as German Shepherds, Labrador Retrievers, and Golden Retrievers are more popular.

==== Americans with Disability Act ====
The ADA (Americans with Disabilities Act of 1990) in the United States defines a service animal as "a dog that is individually trained to do work or perform tasks for an individual with a disability." Emotional support animals do not qualify as service animals under the ADA.

From the year it became active, that is, 1990, ADA inhibits any kind of discrimination against disabled Individuals. Although even before this, the Fair Housing section of the Civil Rights Act of 1964 also protects disabled individuals, the ADA solely focuses on discrimination based on disability. The scope of the American Disabilities Act is vast as it not only inhibits discrimination by the housing authorities but also covers the areas related to employment, transportation, education, etc.

There are different authorities that keep checking that ADA is wholly followed in the United States. For example, the U.S. Equal Employment Opportunity Commission (EEOC) ensures that there is no discrimination against disabled employees in the country. Whereas the Department of Transportation, with its full potential, makes sure that public vehicles and related services are comfortable for disabled individuals.

==== Federal Fair Housing Act ====
In 1988, the Federal Fair Housing Amendment Act banned discrimination against individuals based on their disability. Landlords are obliged to approve reasonable accommodation requests for disabled tenants so that disabled tenants can enjoy the dwelling as much as non-disabled tenants. Reasonable accommodations can include living with an assistance animal. The assistance animal can be a trained service animal or emotional support animal.

No matter the breed, type, size, or weight of these assistance animals, the landlord has to allow them in the housing even if they follow a no-pet policy. In accordance with this Fair Housing Act, the landlords cannot ask for any extra charges for allowing either trained service animal or emotional support animals in the rental housing.

==== State Laws ====
Nearly every state offers protections for service animals. All states minus four impose criminal penalties on persons who interfere with, steal, or assault service animals.

=== Other regions ===
- In most South American countries and Mexico, guide dog access depends solely upon the goodwill of the owner or manager. In more tourist-heavy areas, guide dogs are generally welcomed without problems. In Brazil, however, a 2006 federal decree requires allowance of guide dogs in all public and open to public places. The Federal District Metro has developed a program which trains guide dogs to ride it.
- In Europe, the situation varies by location. Some countries have laws that govern the entire country and sometimes the decision is left up to the respective regions.
- In Australia, the Disability Discrimination Act 1992 protects all assistance dog handlers. Current laws may not ensure that assistance dog users can always have their service animals present in all situations. Each state and territory has its own laws, which mainly pertain to guide dogs. Queensland has introduced the Guide Hearing and Assistance Dog Act 2009 that covers all certified assistance dogs.
- In Canada, guide dogs along with other service animals are allowed anywhere that the general public is allowed, as long as the owner is in control of them. Fines for denying a service animal access can be up to $3000 in Alberta, Canada. There are separate laws for service dogs in Alberta, British Columbia, Nova Scotia, and Ontario.
- In South Korea, it is illegal to deny access to guide dogs in any areas that are open to the public. Violators are fined for no more than 2 million won.

== Animals for individual assistance ==
Many service animals may be trained to perform tasks to help their disabled partners live independent lives.

=== Service dogs ===
Service dogs are the most widely recognized service animal. Dogs can support a litany of both physical and mental disabilities. A mobility assistance dog helps with movement; this may be a large dog that can provide physical support or to help propel a wheelchair, or a dog that has been trained to do specific small tasks, such as pushing a door open. A guide dog helps blind people walk safely. A hearing dog alerts deaf people to important sounds, such as a ringing alarm. Some dogs are medical response dogs that sense a medical issue and alert the handler. Seizure sensing dogs can be trained to sense epileptic seizures in their partner. A diabetes alert dog senses when a person's blood sugar level is dangerously low or high. A psychiatric assistance dog may be trained to calm someone who is upset, help the handler leave an overwhelming situation, or signal specific events (e.g., to interrupt a habitual behavior, such as picking at the skin when anxious). Autism assistance dogs help individuals with autism.

=== Miniature horse ===
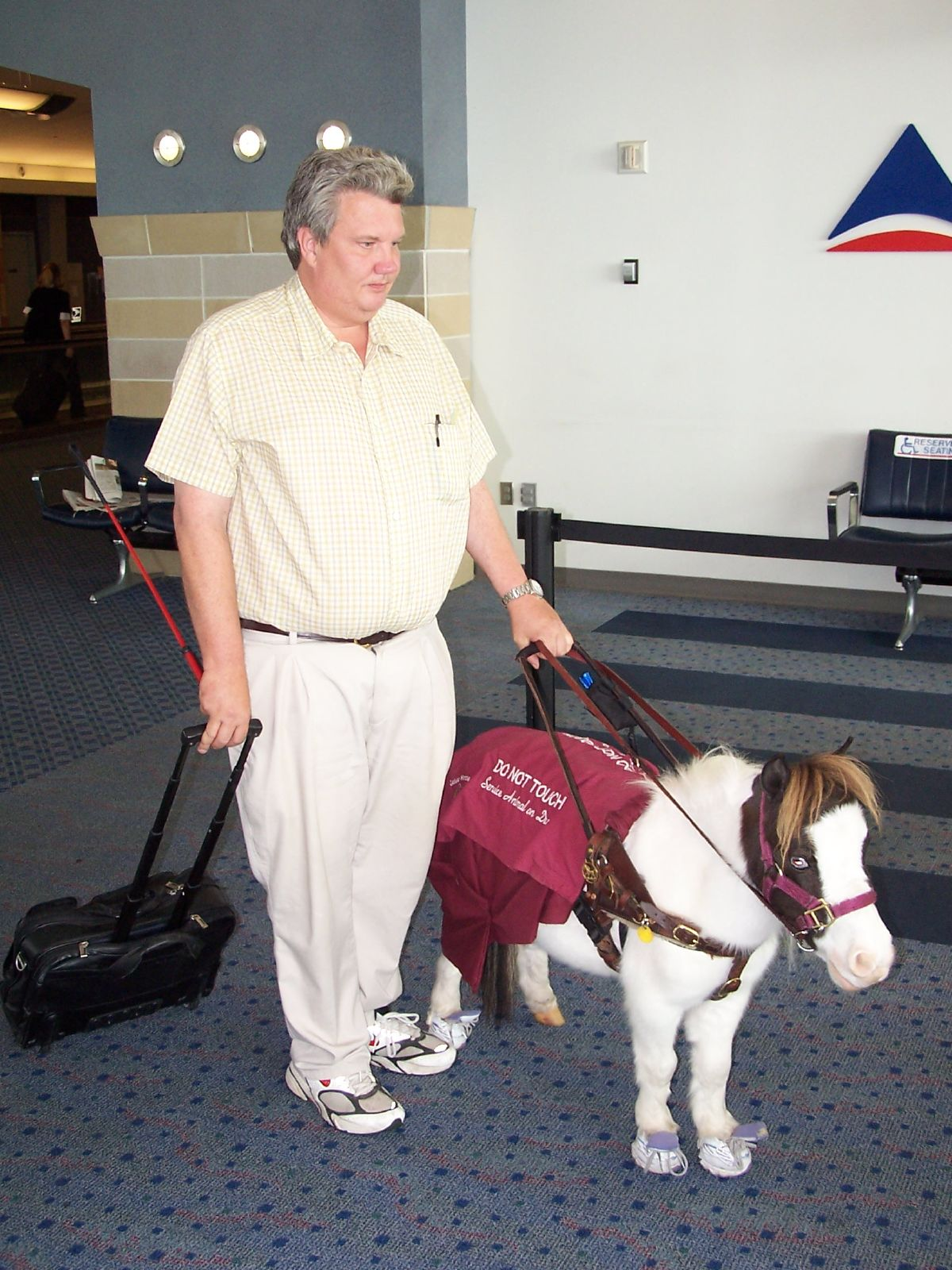
A miniature horse working as a guide animal at the Cincinnati airport.

A miniature horse can be trained to as a guide horse for a blind person, to pull wheelchairs, or as support for persons with Parkinson's disease.

A full-grown miniature horse can vary from 26 to 38 inches. There are two main registering organisations. The American Miniature Horse Association limits height to 34 inches whereas the American Miniature Horse Registry has a division for horses 34 to 38 in.

There are a number of advantages of miniature horses as service animals. Miniature horses may be chosen by people whose religion considers dogs to be unclean or who have serious allergies to dogs, as well as phobias. Miniature horses have average lifespans of 30–35 years (longer than those of both service dogs and monkeys) and take at least 6 months to a year of training, done only by professional trainers. The training period is usually longer for a miniature horse than for a dog, partly because horses are easily spooked by loud noises.

While a service dog may be mistaken for a pet, guide horse users report they typically are immediately recognized as a working service animal. Miniature horses have been noted for their range of vision (350 degrees), calm nature, recall, focused demeanor, and cost-effectiveness considering their long working life of 20 years They are well suited to guiding people with no or low vision.

=== Helper monkey ===
A helper monkey was a type of assistance animal trained to help people with quadriplegia, severe spinal cord injuries, or other mobility impairments, similar to a mobility assistance dog. Starting in the 1970s and up through 2020, the Boston-based organization Helping Hands trained capuchin monkeys to perform manual tasks such as grasping items, including operating knobs and switches, washing their human's face, microwaving food and opening drink bottles, and turning the pages of a book. The number of animals successfully placed in the program was very low. Over 30 years after its founding, Helping Hands had placed an average of about five monkeys per year. These individual placements often received national media coverage.

In 2010, the U.S. federal government revised its definition of service animal under the Americans with Disabilities Act (ADA). Non-human primates are no longer recognised as service animals under the ADA. The American Veterinary Medical Association does not support the use of non-human primates as assistance animals because of animal welfare concerns, the potential for serious injury to people, and risks that primates may transfer dangerous diseases to humans. The organization that trained monkey helpers, Helping Hands, rebranded in 2023, becoming Envisioning Access and turning its focus to assistive technologies.

== See also ==
- Emotional support animal—an animal that makes the owner feel better emotionally
- Animal-assisted therapy—therapy that uses contact with animals to improve a patient's social, emotional, or cognitive functioning
- Working animal—an animal that is trained to engage in productive tasks
- School dog —a dog in the classroom to support learning outcomes
