= Autism assistance dog =

Type of service dog

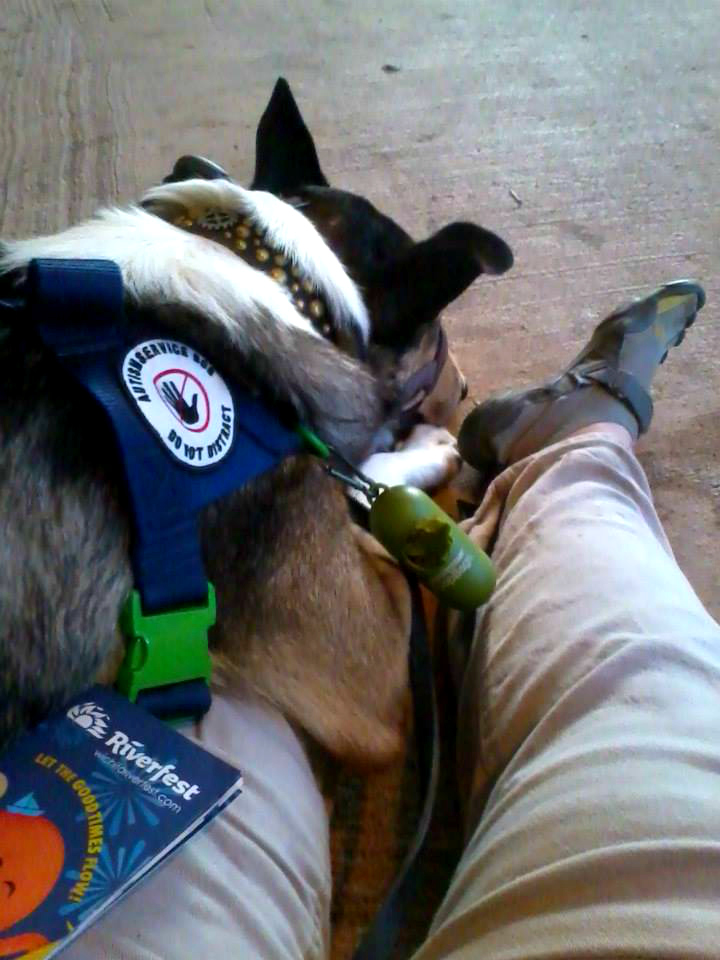
A tri-color smooth collie autism assistance dog performs a deep pressure task for its adult handler during an outdoor concert.

An autism assistance dog or autism service dog is an assistance dog trained to assist an autistic person manage their disability and live more independently.

== History ==
The first autism assistance dog was trained by Chris Fowler, who founded the first organization worldwide called National Service Dogs in 1996. He placed a dog named Shade with an autistic child in 1997. Autism is a lifelong disability with characteristics that vary from person to person. Training for autism assistance dogs is similar to guide dog training. Autism assistance dogs usually cost between $12,000 and $30,000. There is often a long wait list for autism assistant dogs.

Anecdotal evidence of the efficacy of autism assistance dogs is greater than the amount of research on the practice. Without objective standards, it can be difficult for parents, caregivers, and educators to make a case for the need for autism assistance dogs.

== Function ==
Autism assistance dogs are trained to perform specific tasks to help their owners live independently and navigate the world. Autism assistant dogs often perform tasks like DPT (Deep Pressure Therapy), back/front block, crowd control, alerting to sounds such as timers or a fire alarm, medication reminders, self-injury interruption, retrieving dropped items and other tasks to help calm anxiety, prevent sensory overload or underwhelm, ensure safety and assist in daily living.

=== Children ===
The primary focus of an autism assistance dog for a child is to protect the safety of the children they work with. For example, autism assistance dogs are sometimes trained to prevent autistic children from leaving the house unsupervised. When autism assistance dogs are paired with children, the dog often takes commands from the parents, not the child. Autism assistance dogs also alert parents of dangerous situations regarding the children they work with. Autism assistance dogs can help open the door for children and keep them from becoming overstimulated or understimulated.

Sometimes a child harness—attached to an autism assistance dog—is worn by the autistic child. There recently has been controversy over this, due to the sudden force put on the dog as well as it preventing the child from escaping distressing situations such as an unpredictable attack from an untrained dog (this is common for handlers).

=== Adults ===
Dogs may be trained to alert their handler to important noises or other things requiring human intervention, such as smoke or a smoke alarm, a crying baby, a telephone ringing, or a knock at the door. For a person with autism, it may not be immediately obvious which of the many external stimuli is the urgent one requiring their immediate attention. Autistic people may not recognize urgency and be unable to react in situations, thus this task is extremely important. An autistic person may have difficulty navigating a heavily stimulating environment and become uneasy. This uneasiness may cause a loss of balance, panic attacks, meltdowns, and over-stimulation episodes, all of which are very distressing for everyone around and the individuals themselves. A dog can assist by providing a trained sensory input such as putting pressure on the tissue, licking, and even grounding. Autism assistance dogs provide grounding by sitting on their feet, applying pressure when the owner is anxious or overwhelmed. Autistic individuals may also experience getting lost when traveling in a party or with another person. Often they find themselves unable to reconnect with people and even finding it difficult to ask for help. Some autism assistance dogs have training in tracking people through scent, which may aid in wandering. Some autistic people have to leave an area that is too overwhelming for them, and assistance dogs can help guide them to an exit and provide on-command services to help them once in a safe area.

== Impacts ==
Some autistic children have been reported to have an increased sense of independence because of their interactions with the autism assistance dog.

Quantitative studies show that assistance dogs can be associated with lower autism symptoms, higher adaptive functioning, slightly better mental health, better child safety, and moderately less parental stress. Qualitative studies show that assistance dogs are perceived by their family as increasing child safety, increasing confidence of children with ASD, behavioral changes, better sociability as the dog helps connecting with others, improvement in emotional regulation, and reducing parental stress when being in public. Owning a service dog is however associated with some challenges such as investing time, energy and money to care for the dog to ensure the dog's wellbeing, but also doing life adjustments to integrate the dog in the family routine and build the relationship between the dog and the autistic child. Families may also face access denial and have to spend time raising awareness about assistance dogs.

Overall, more high-quality research is needed to understand whether the benefits of assistance dogs is higher than the benefits of owning a companion dog.

== See also ==
- Companion dog
- Guide dog
- Hearing dog
- Medical response dog
- Mobility assistance dog
- Psychiatric service dog
- Seizure dog
- Service animal
- Child harness
