= NEADS Inc. =

Non-profit that trains service dogs

NEADS Inc. is an American 501(c)(3) nonprofit program that provides trained service dogs to people who have physical disabilities or who are deaf or hearing impaired; veterans with PTSD; and children with autism or other developmental disabilities.

== History ==
NEADS Inc. began in 1976 as The Hearing Ear Dog Program, on the Lenox, Massachusetts campus of Holliston Junior College. With seed money from the Medfield Lions Club, students in the Animal Care Program determined that hearing dogs could be trained to become "ears" for people who are deaf or hearing impaired. In 1987, after training over 400 hearing dog "teams", The Hearing Ear Dog Program expanded to train service dogs to become the "arms and/or legs" for people with physical disabilities. In 1989, to reflect these new services, The Hearing Ear Dog Program changed its name to New England Assistance Dog Services (NEADS legally changed its name to NEADS Inc. in 2018). NEADS began the Prison PUP Program in 1998, in which prison inmates foster and train service dog puppies for one to two years. In 2000, NEADS expanded its services to include the training of service dogs trained to assist children with autism and other developmental disabilities. In 2006, NEADS began a specialty program for injured soldiers returning from the Iraq and Afghanistan wars through its Service Dogs for Veterans program and now serves veterans from all wars. The organization now resides on an 18-acre (73,000 m^{2}) campus in Princeton, Massachusetts.

== Purpose Breeding and Source of Puppies for the Program ==
Originally, NEADS used dogs from shelters and private breeders. In 2000, purpose-bred puppies from Guiding Eyes for the Blind and other service dog organizations were introduced. The program completion rate for these dogs with specific temperaments and excellent health was higher, so NEADS has shifted to using primarily purpose-bred dogs – obtained through its own breeding program and from other Service/Guide Dog organizations – to allow for better control for temperament, health, and overall suitability for service dog work. NEADS strives to maintain genetic diversity through collaborating with other top-quality industry partners across North America through careful and intentional mate selection. NEADS furthered its commitment to its breeding program with the opening of its breeding center in 2022.

Early socialization exposes the puppies to different surfaces, people, sounds and objects. Progressive socialization continues throughout the pup's training to make sure that when they are matched with a client, they are experienced and confident.

== Prison PUP Program ==
The NEADS Prison PUP Program was started in 1998. NEADS partners with six correctional facilities in Massachusetts and Rhode Island, where inmates train the dogs for one to two years. As early as 16 weeks, puppies live, train, and bond with inmates. NEADS trainers visit the facilities once a week to teach the inmates how to train their puppies, and to monitor progress.

The prison pups spend weekends with volunteer "weekend puppy raisers," who educate the dogs about the outside world by taking the dogs with them everywhere they go: to the movies, grocery shopping, and experiencing general socialization.

== Training ==
Dogs are taught over 60 commands in two years. They learn how to pick up keys, open doors, provide physical stability for their handler, and open and close the refrigerator, among other tasks. The cost to the organization to train each dog is around $45,000.

== Service Dogs ==
Between 1976 and 2022, NEADS has trained and placed more than 1,900 service dogs nationwide in the following categories:

- Service Dogs for adults with physical disabilities and for children with physical disabilities (ages 12 and up)
- Service Dogs for Children for children ages 8–12 with autism or other developmental disabilities
- Service Dogs for Hearing for individuals aged 15 and older who are deaf or who have severe hearing loss
- Assistance Dogs are partnered with professionals in classroom, ministry, therapy, hospital, and courthouse settings
- Service dogs for Veterans for veterans who have a permanent disability, are deaf or who have severe hearing loss, or who have combat-related post-traumatic stress

=== Service Dogs for Veterans ===
The first Service Dogs for Veterans (formerly known as Canines for Combat Veterans) service dog, Rainbow, was placed in 2006 with Sergeant Roland Paquette, an Afghanistan war vet who lost both his legs. Rainbow was trained by an inmate at the Northeast Correctional Center. NEADS has provided service dogs to veterans at no cost since 2006. Since that time, NEADS has matched over 100 dogs with veterans. NEADS was the first service dog organization in the US to be invited to Walter Reed Army Medical Center to present the ways service dogs could help wounded combat veterans. The program has expanded and now serves veterans with disabilities that may not be related to their service.
