= Assistance dog =

Working dog trained to aid or assist an individual with a disability

An assistance dog pressing a button to open an automatic door

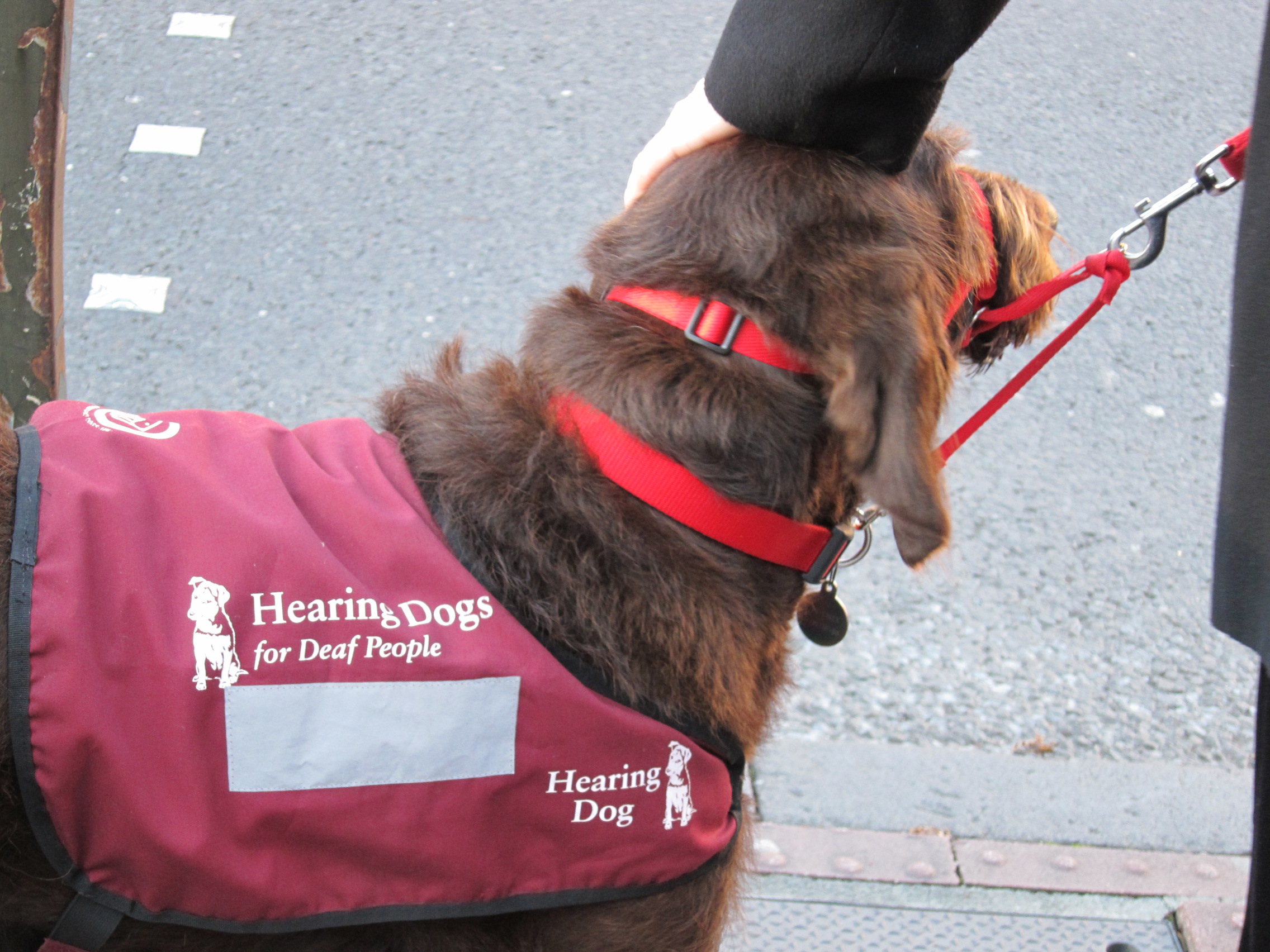
Hearing-assistance dog being patted on its head

An assistance dog is a dog that receives specialized training to aid an individual with a disability by helping with everyday tasks. Many countries do not legally recognize assistance dogs. Those who do set strict guidelines, requiring dogs to pass formal training to receive legal recognition as an assistance dog, granting them access rights to public spaces, businesses serving the public, means of transportation, and workplace.

== Terminology ==
Assistance dog is the generic term for a dog that provides assistance to a disabled person and is task-trained to help mitigate the handler's disability. Assistance dogs are also commonly referred to as service dogs.

Assistance dogs are distinct from therapy dogs. The term therapy dog can designate dogs working with healthcare professionals to perform animal-assisted therapy, or be dogs of volunteer handlers who visit hospitals, nursing homes, libraries or schools. Therapy dogs can be specifically trained and certified, but are not protected by the same laws as assistance dogs.

Service dogs are also distinct from emotional support animals. The term emotional support animals is defined as an animal that provides general comfort to individuals with a mental or psychiatric disability as opposed to specific accommodating tasks.

=== Types of assistance dogs ===
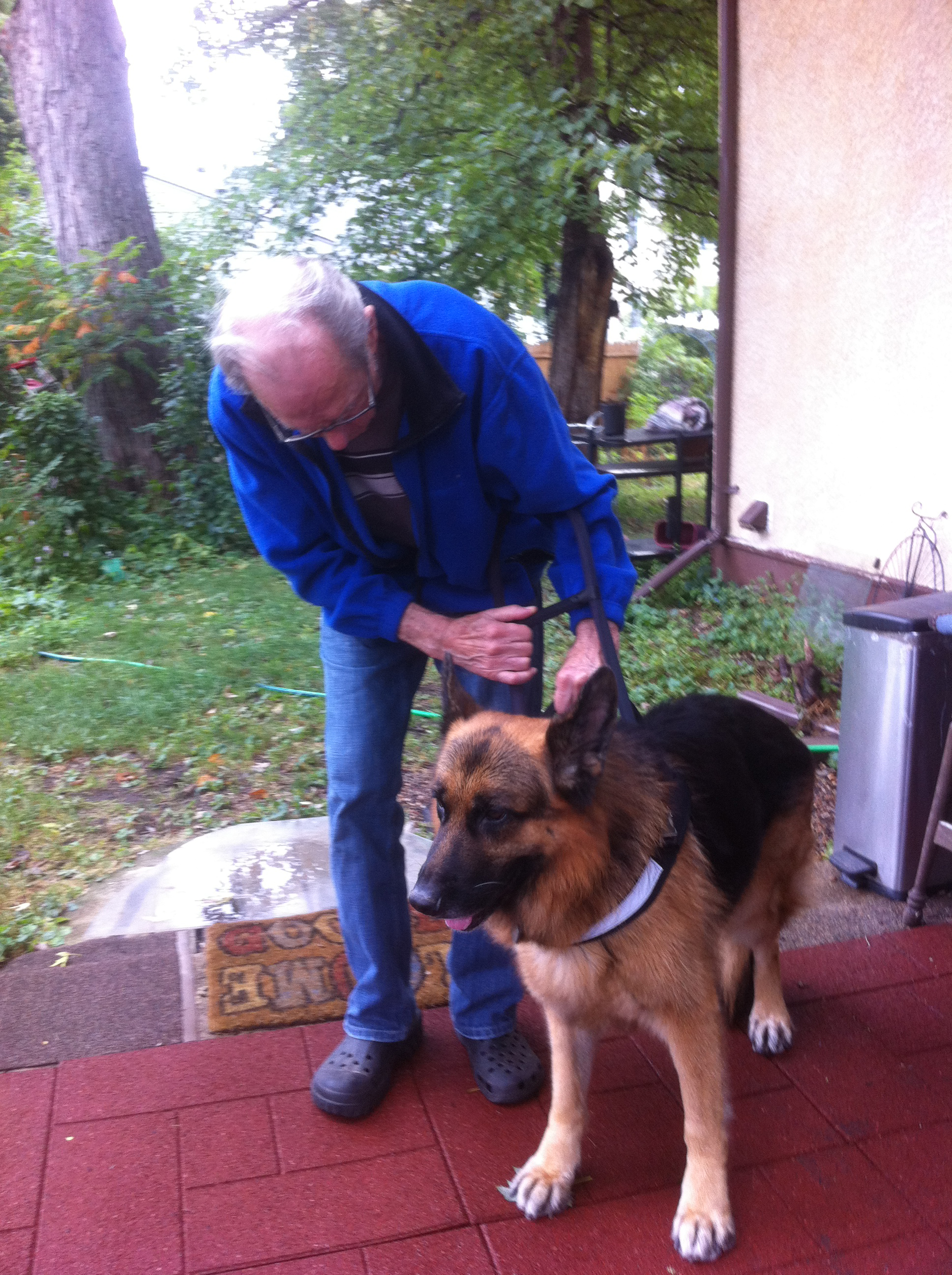
Mobility assistance dog helping his handler stand up

Various types of assistance dogs are trained to compensate various disabilities:

- guide dog: help to lead visually impaired people.
- hearing dog: help listen to sounds for people with hearing impairment.
- mobility assistance dog: help physically disabled people.
- medical response dog: help with identifying and reacting to specific health crisis.
  - seizure response dog: trained to alert and provide help during medical episodes.
  - psychiatric assistance dog
  - autism assistance dog: help their handlers to cope with psychiatric or mental disabilities.

Assistance Dogs International taxonomy uses three categories: guide dogs, hearing dogs, and service dogs (which includes dogs helping with physical disabilities, medical responses and psychiatric conditions).

== Training process ==
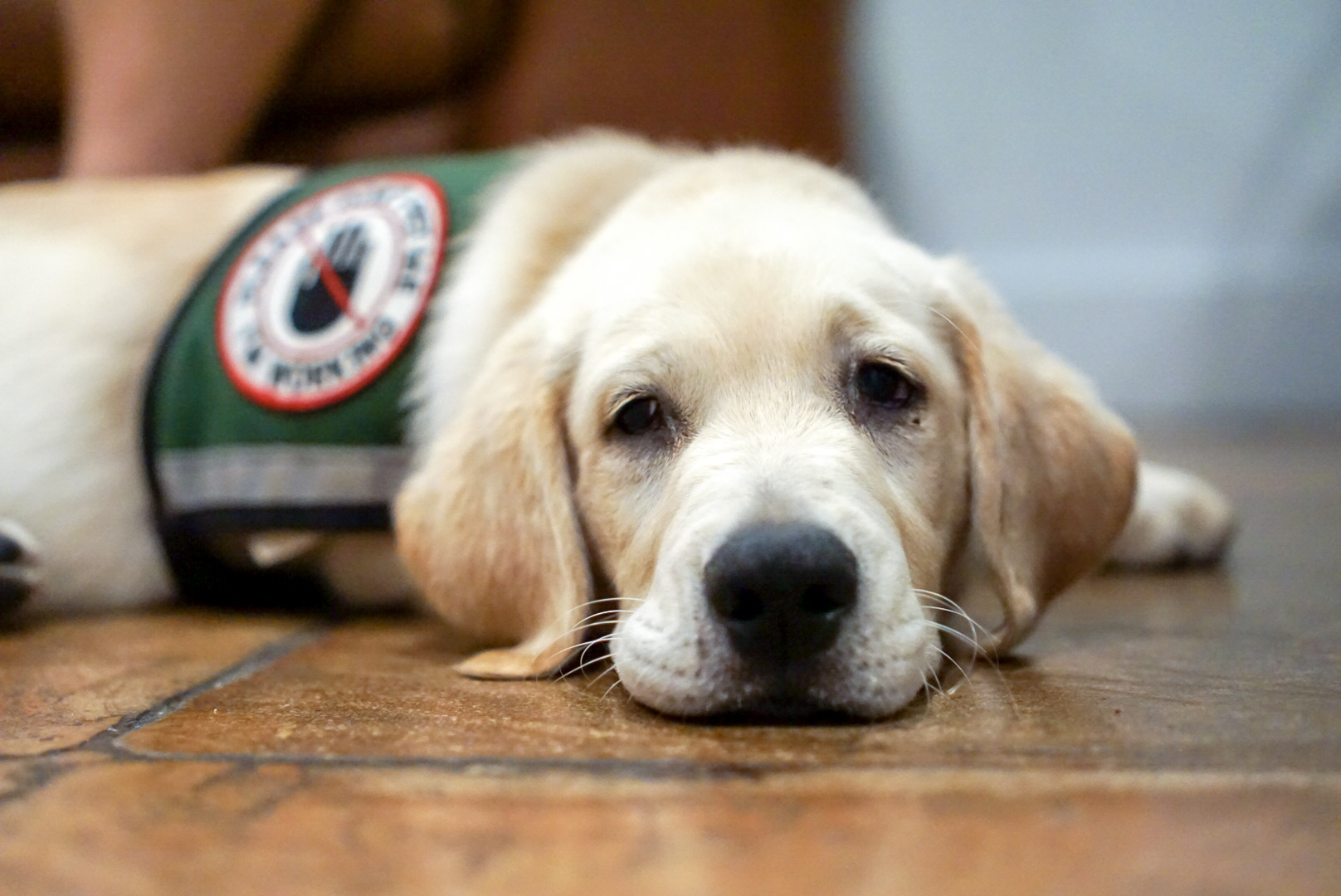
Assistance dog in training in its vest

Assistance dogs are traditionally trained by professional organizations. In a few countries, such as the United States, United Kingdom, and Australia, assistance dogs can also be trained by their handlers. However, in most countries, only dogs trained and certified by an officially recognized organization can be recognized as assistance dogs and benefit from the associated legal protections.

A prospective assistance dog candidate will go through socialization and desensitization training, where the dog is exposed to unfamiliar locations, sounds, scents, and other stimuli. This training sets the foundations for the assistance dog to remain focused while working. An assistance dog prospect will also go through obedience training to ensure they remain under control of the handler.

After completing obedience training, an assistance dog commences specialized task training. During this training, the assistance dog will learn to perform tasks that will aid their handler. The tasks that an assistance dog is trained to perform will differ based on the handler's disabilities and needs.

Examples of tasks include alerting to a fire alarm or doorbell, retrieving a medication during a medical episode, pulling a wheelchair, retrieving an item that has been dropped by the handler, and turning on lights. Some tasks may require a larger dog with healthy joints, while others (e.g. alerting to a sound) can be performed by a dog of any size.

== Legal frameworks ==
Not all countries have established specific legislations for service dogs. When there is a legislation, it generally allows service dogs to enter public spaces where dogs are usually not allowed in. Legislations varies regarding the mandatory training, certification, equipment, and registration that service dogs should have to be officially recognized and benefit from public access rights. However, assistance dogs are usually expected to meet the following criteria:

1. The dog's handler meet the legal definition of disability in the country or region.
2. The dog is trained to mitigate the handler's disability in some way,--e.g. opening doors, detecting high blood sugar or allergens and notifying of such, alerting to a ringing phone or other audible stimuli, assisting handlers with PTSD, assisting those who are visually impaired, helping individuals with disabilities that affect their mobility, and much more.
3. The dog is docile and well-behaved, as well as clean and healthy.

Individual countries and regions will have specific laws and regulations, with these international criteria having broad recognition across the globe.

== Worldwide ==
=== Australia ===
In theory, the Australian Disability Discrimination Act (1999/2009) recognize service dogs/animals as animals which are accredited under the law, accredited by an animal training organization (recognized by the regulation), and meet appropriate hygiene and behavioral standards compatible with entering public spaces.

=== European Union ===
The European Union do not have international directive regarding service dogs, however each country may have national legislation for service dogs. There is, however, a European committee working on standardizing notions around vocabulary, dog welfare, competencies of assistance dog professionals, dog training requirements and recommendations for accessibility of public and private spaces for assistance dog teams. The norm resulting from the work of this committee is the CEN/TC 452 norm.

In France, people with disability having disability card can ask to benefit from a service dog. Only dogs trained and certified by non-profit organizations recognized by the State benefit from legal protection and are authorized to enter everywhere, including in public spaces and transportation. Assistance dog owners can under certain conditions apply to receive payment to cover their dog food and veterinary care (around €50 per month).

In Austria, assistance dog are considered within the Austrian Federal Law for Disabled People. Assistance dogs needs the recognition of an official coordinating authority having the relevant expertise and appointed by the government. Since 2014 the Messerli Research Institute is the official authority established by the Republic of Austria and hosts the inspection center for assistance dogs. Austrian legislation states the requirements service dogs should meet in term of health condition, behavior, and working performance. To be qualified and recognized as an assistance dogs, the candidate service dogs must pass two assessments: before and after being handed to their final owner. Qualified service dogs are registered on their owner's disability card, can enter public buildings and do not have to be leashed or muzzled.

=== Hong Kong ===
Two Hong Kong members of the Assistance Dog International include the Hong Kong Guide Dogs Association and Hong Kong Seeing Eye Services. The Disability Discrimination Ordinance protects visually impaired individuals and their guide dogs. The Hong Kong Seeing Eye Services also redirects dogs who do not meet the criteria to be guide dogs to become companion dogs.

=== Japan ===
In Japan, the Act on Assistance Dogs for Persons with Disabilities (2003, amended in 2007) allows people with disabilities to have a service dog accompany them to enter public space and private businesses serving the general public and workplaces. The law recognizes three types of assistance dogs: guide dogs, service dogs, and hearing dogs. Service dog teams have to be certified after an assessment. Dogs are evaluated on sociability and obedience, and suitable dogs are trained to become service dogs. Beneficiaries are evaluated on their aptitude and medical needs. Then dogs and their partners are matched and go through additional team training before a final certification. Depending on the type of assistance dogs, dog training organizations have to be registered at a local prefectural government or the National Public Safety Commission, and organizations certifying assistance dogs are designated by the Minister of Health, Labor, and Welfare or the National Public Safety Commission. Assistance dogs and their partner must carry their certification papers and the dogs should carry a mandatory sign to access public spaces.

=== Russia ===
In 2022, Russian legislation only recognized guide dogs, and not other types of assistance dogs. In 2005, guide dogs have been officially recognized as assistive technology. The legislation does not offer official definition of a guide dog, but state they should have a "Guide Dog Passport" in order to have public access rights (there is no regulation about access to workplaces). Only organizations approved by the Federal Government can certify guide dogs and only two guide dog training schools were recognized in 2022. Guide dog owners can apply to receive an annual payment to cover veterinary care from the Federal Government.

=== United Kingdom ===
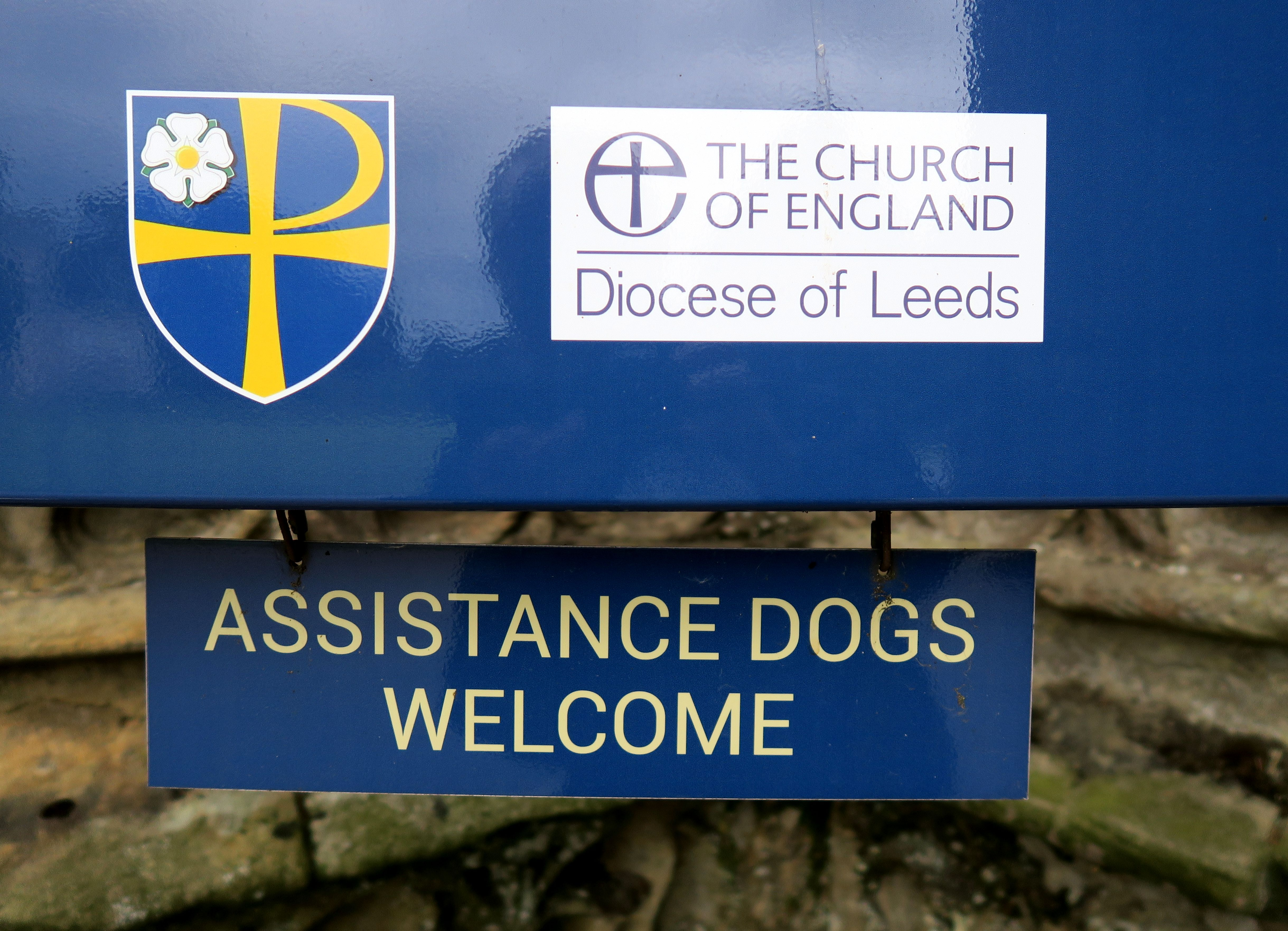
"Assistance Dogs welcome" sign in Bolton Priory

In the United Kingdom, the Equality Act 2010 prohibits discrimination against people who utilize assistance dogs in public spaces.

Although assistance dogs are legally recognized in the United Kingdom, the organization that regulates assistance dogs, Assistance Dogs UK (ADUK), is considered a voluntary coalition and registered charity (1119538) with accreditations by Assistance Dogs International (ADI) and The International Guide Dog Federation (IDGF).

=== United States ===
In the United States, the Americans with Disability Act states that there is no formal certification or registration required for a dog to become an Assistance Dog. However, the dog should be trained to perform specific tasks for people with disabilities. State and local governments, businesses, and nonprofit organizations that serve the public must allow service animals to accompany people with disabilities in all areas of the facility where the public is normally allowed to go.

In the service dog community, the issue of "fake service dogs" creates ongoing debates about whether service dogs should go through a formal certification.

== See also ==
- Assistance animal – Animal to assist people with disabilities
- Cell dog – Dog housed with a prisoner
- Bravehound
- Dogs for Good (in the UK)
- Hearing Dogs for Deaf People (in the UK)
- Working dog – Dog trained to perform practical tasks
- School dog – Use of dogs in educational settings to support wellbeing and learning
