= Companion dog =

Dog intended as a human companion

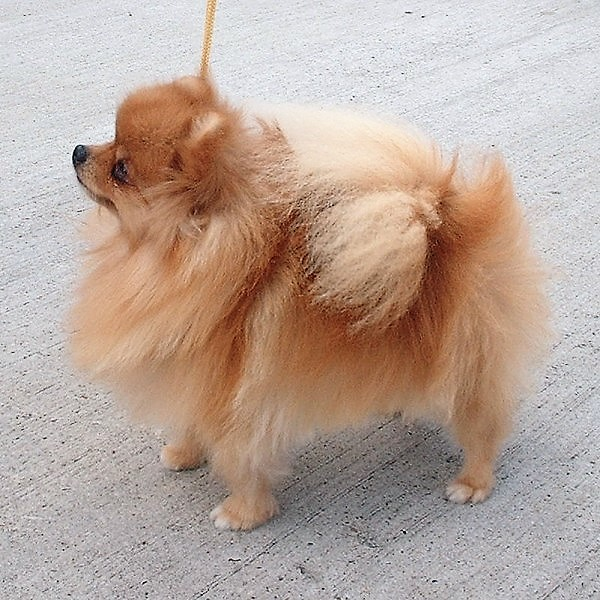
The Pomeranian dog started out as two types, a large, sled-type dog and the toy Melitaie. The sled dog was outbred and crossbred to the smaller to become the small companion dog it is today.

A companion dog is a dog which is not primarily a working dog but a pet. The primary function of a companion dog is not to perform a useful job but to provide companionship to humans. A companion dog can also be called an emotional support animal and is used to help people with mental health disabilities cope with symptoms. Most dogs can be companions, including many working dog breeds such as retrievers, who are enjoyed primarily for their friendly nature as a pet. Most toy dog breeds are used only for the pleasure of their company, not as workers. The American Kennel Club also offers a Companion Dog (CD) title for judged dog obedience competitions.

== Description ==
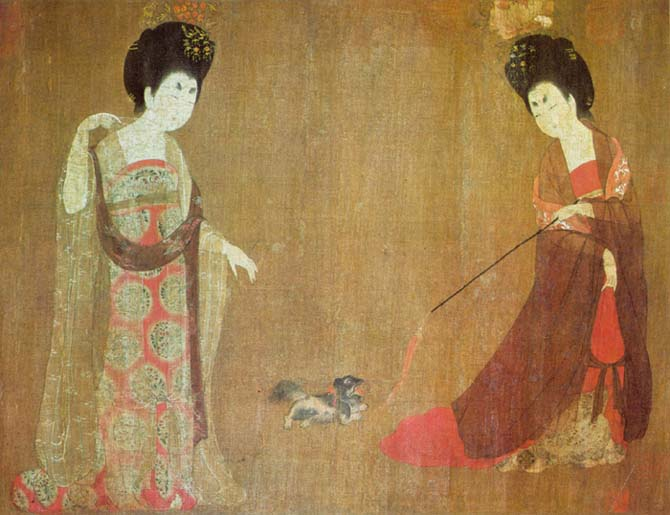
Court ladies playing with a small dog, Beauties Wearing Flowers by Tang dynasty painter Zhou Fang

Breed groups argue that any dog in the working group type is inherently a "working" dog, while others argue that only a dog with an active occupation, either in a breed-related field (such as water trials for retrievers or herding trials for herding dogs) or in a breed-nonspecific field that requires training and discipline, such as being assistance dogs or participating in dog agility, can be considered a working dog.

Dogs that have been chosen for traits that make them convenient pets are generally smaller breeds, and the tradition of keeping pretty dogs for no purpose other than to be court decorations stems back thousands of years to Chinese nobility. The Pekingese and the Pug are both examples of ancient dog breeds chosen for their ability to be pets. In the case of the Pekingese, it was for their lion-like demeanor; for the Pugs, it was for their "lucky" wrinkles and their monkey-like face.

Other dogs that appear to be strictly a decorative or entertaining breed of dog originally also had jobs outside of their main companionship task, such as the Lhasa Apso's job as a watch dog, or the delicate Yorkshire Terrier's exceptional rat-catching abilities.

=== Working breeds as companions ===
Many working dog breeds are often kept primarily for companionship rather than for work. Research on dog ownership indicates that companionship is a primary motivation for acquiring a dog, even among breeds historically developed for practical work. A companion lifestyle may be difficult for some working dog breeds because of a mismatch between the dog's traits and the owner's way of life. For example, herding dogs and terriers are more frequently represented among cases requiring treatment for behavioral disorders.

== Competition Obedience Titles ==
Companion Dog ("CD" added to the dog's registered name) is officially a "Novice obedience Title" in the AKC Competition Obedience Ring, whereby a team enters the "ring" with 200 points, and needs to leave with at least 170 points to "qualify". It requires three "legs" (trials) under three different AKC judges. Any dog can earn a CD title. Levels for obedience are Companion Dog (CD), Companion Dog Excellent (CDX), Utility Dog (UD), Utility Dog Excellent (UDX), Obedience Trial Champion (OTCH), and National Obedience Champion (NOC). A pet dog is not considered a "Companion Dog" without entering a competition ring and creating a document trail. The first AKC licensed obedience trial was held in 1936, where 200 dogs were entered.

== Companion versus toy dogs ==
Toy dogs and companion dogs have a large overlap. However, companion dogs are not limited by size whereas all toy dogs are small.

== Gallery ==
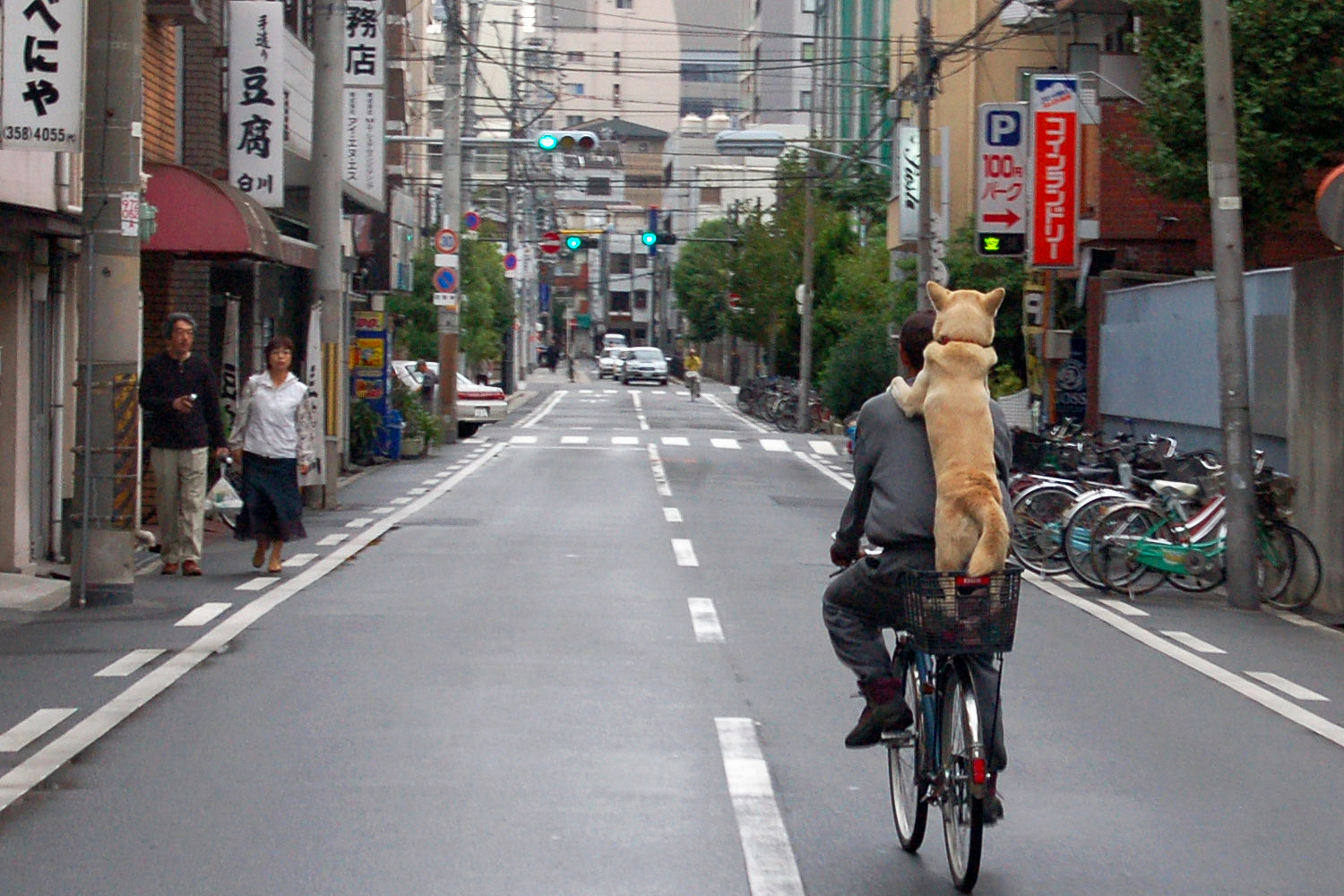
A Shiba dog riding a bicycle with their owner

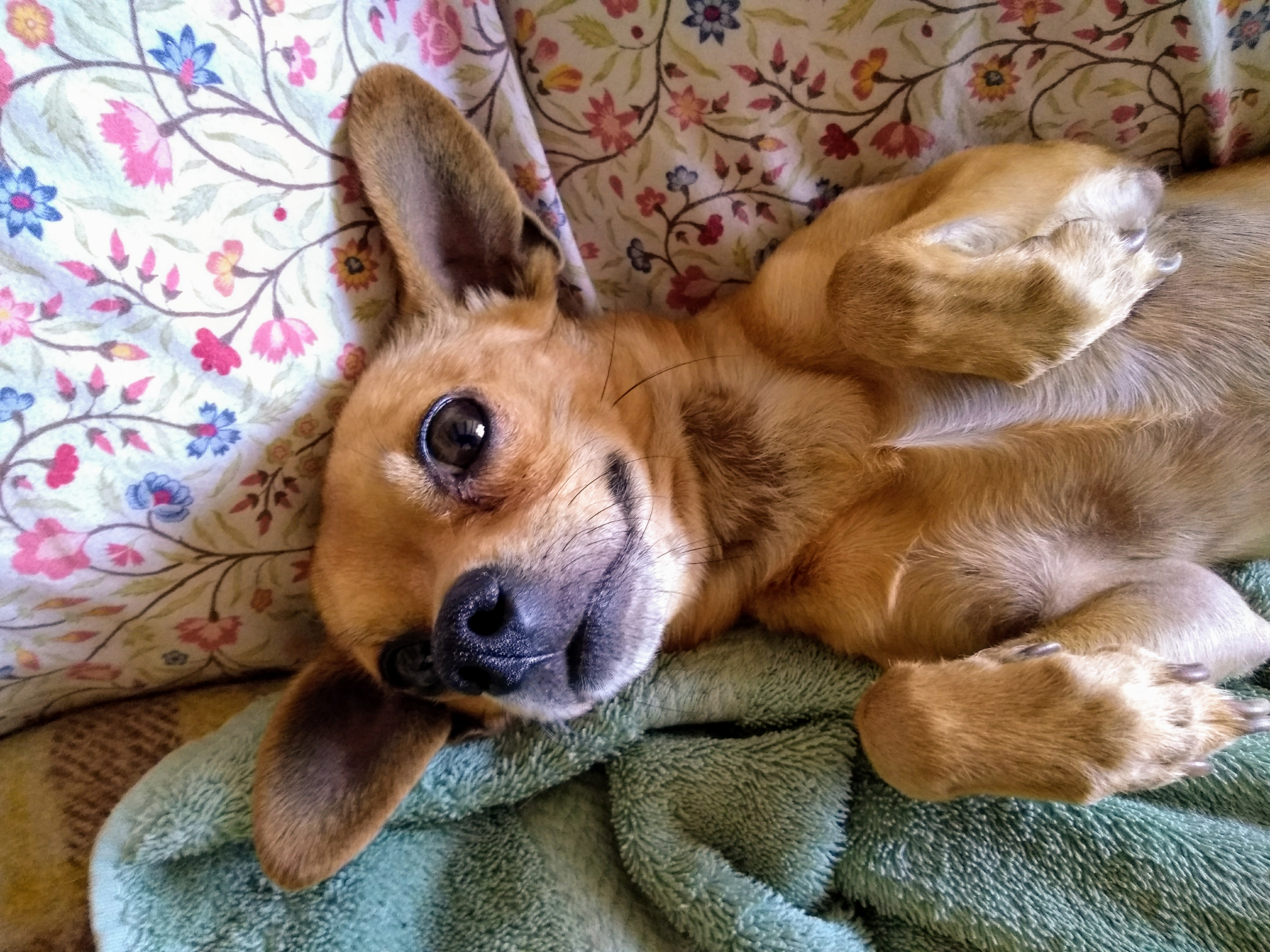
A Chihuahua relaxing at home

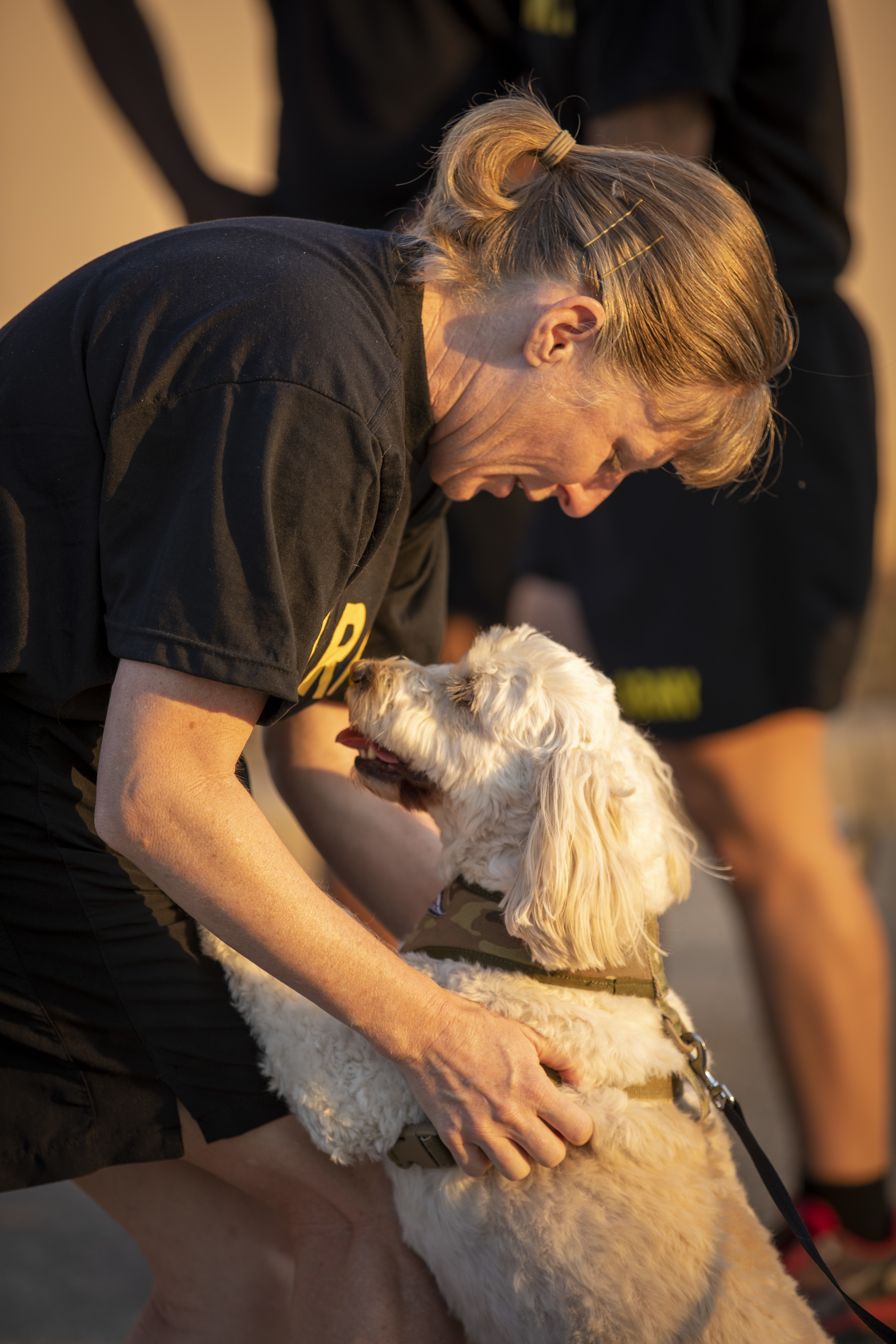
A Poodle receiving a hug

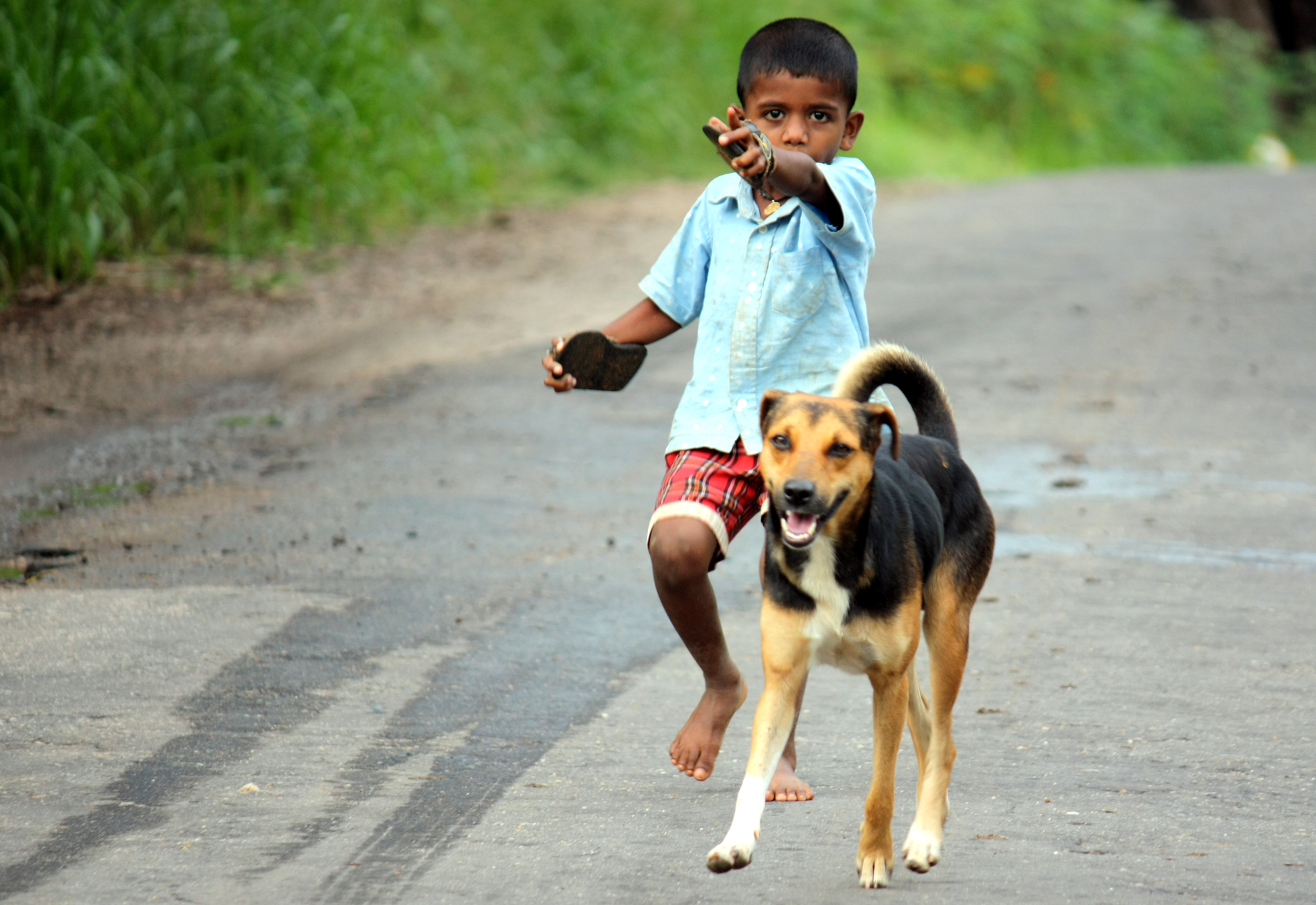
A dog and a boy in Sri Lanka

Queen Victoria's dogs painted in 1838

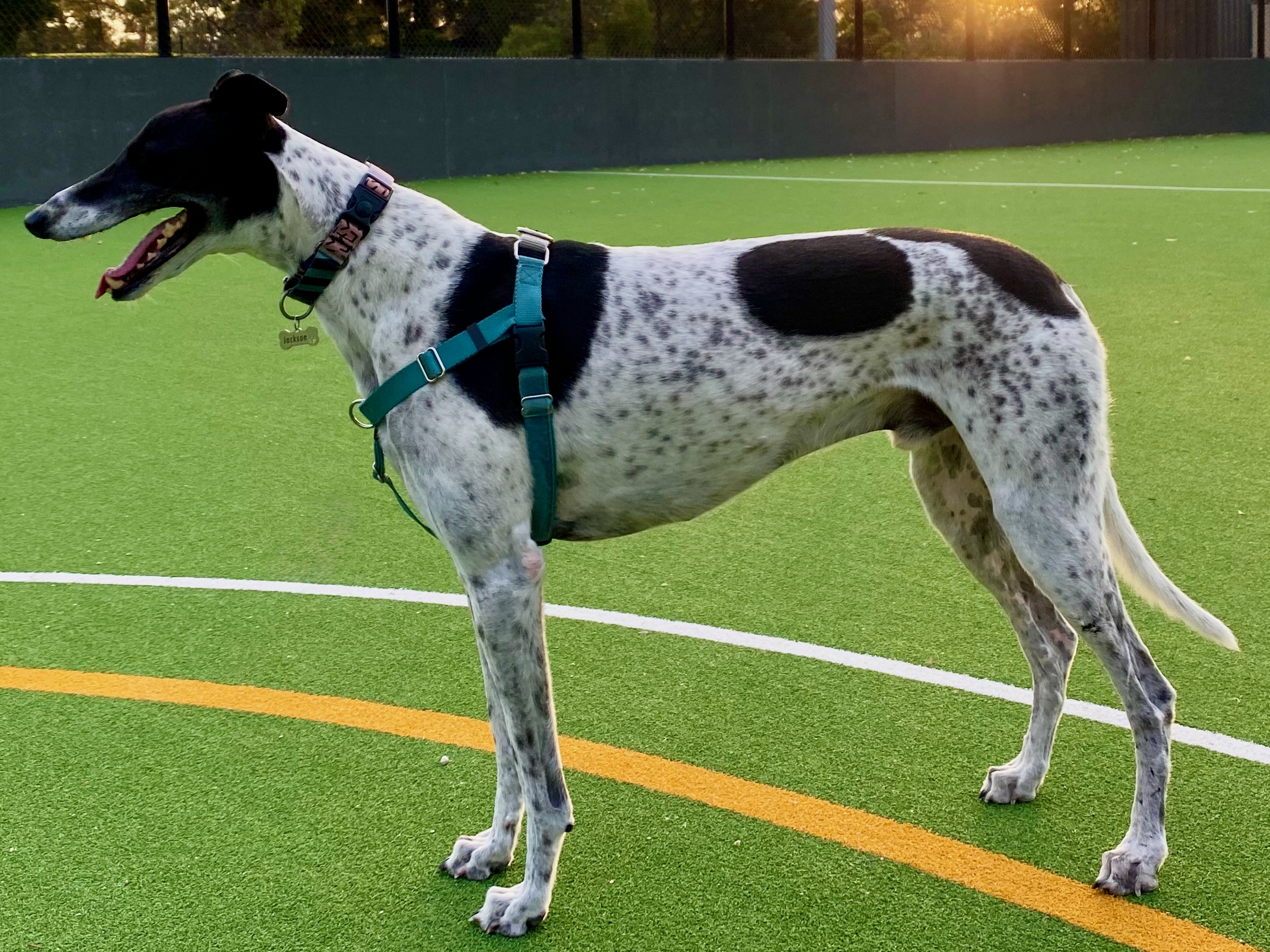
Retired Greyhounds make excellent companion animals

== See also ==
- Pet humanization
