= Dogs for Good =

British charitable organisation

Coordinates: 52°4′13.16″N 1°18′13.55″W

Current logo

Dogs for Good (formerly Dogs for the Disabled ) is a UK-based charity training dogs to help adults and children with physical disabilities and learning disabilities, children with autism and adults with dementia. Until October 2015 it was called Dogs for the Disabled.

== History ==
The charity was founded in 1988 by Frances Hay (1950–90) in Kenilworth, Warwickshire. This was as a result of Frances' personal experience with her own pet dog helping Frances overcome her own disability. Following her death, friends and family continued the work and organization she started. By the time Hay's death, the charity had placed 25 working dogs.

In 2000 a successful application to the National Lottery resulted in the building of a national training centre in Banbury, Oxfordshire where the charity is based today.

== Accreditation ==
Dogs for Good is a fully Accredited Member of Assistance Dogs International (ADI) and meets the ADI standards in its assistance dog work. Dogs for Good is a member of Assistance Dogs UK (ADUK). Assistance Dogs UK is a coalition of assistance dog charities all accredited by Assistance Dogs International. Dogs for Good is a Full member of Animal Assisted Intervention International (AAII) and adheres to the AAII standards in its community dog work.
