= Medical response dog =

Type of service dog

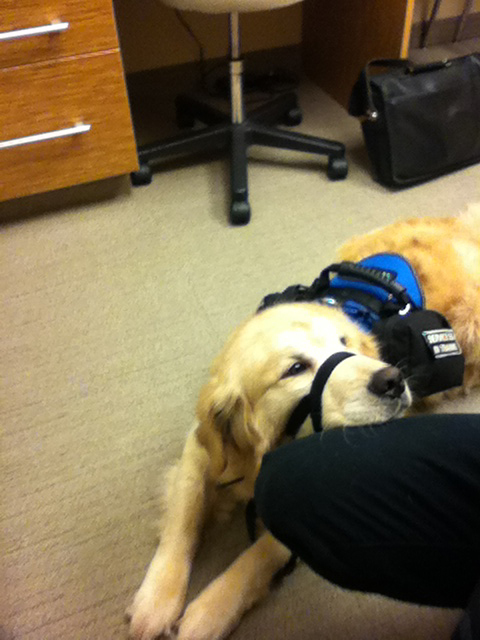
A medical response dog can often be brought to the handler's workplace, such as an office.

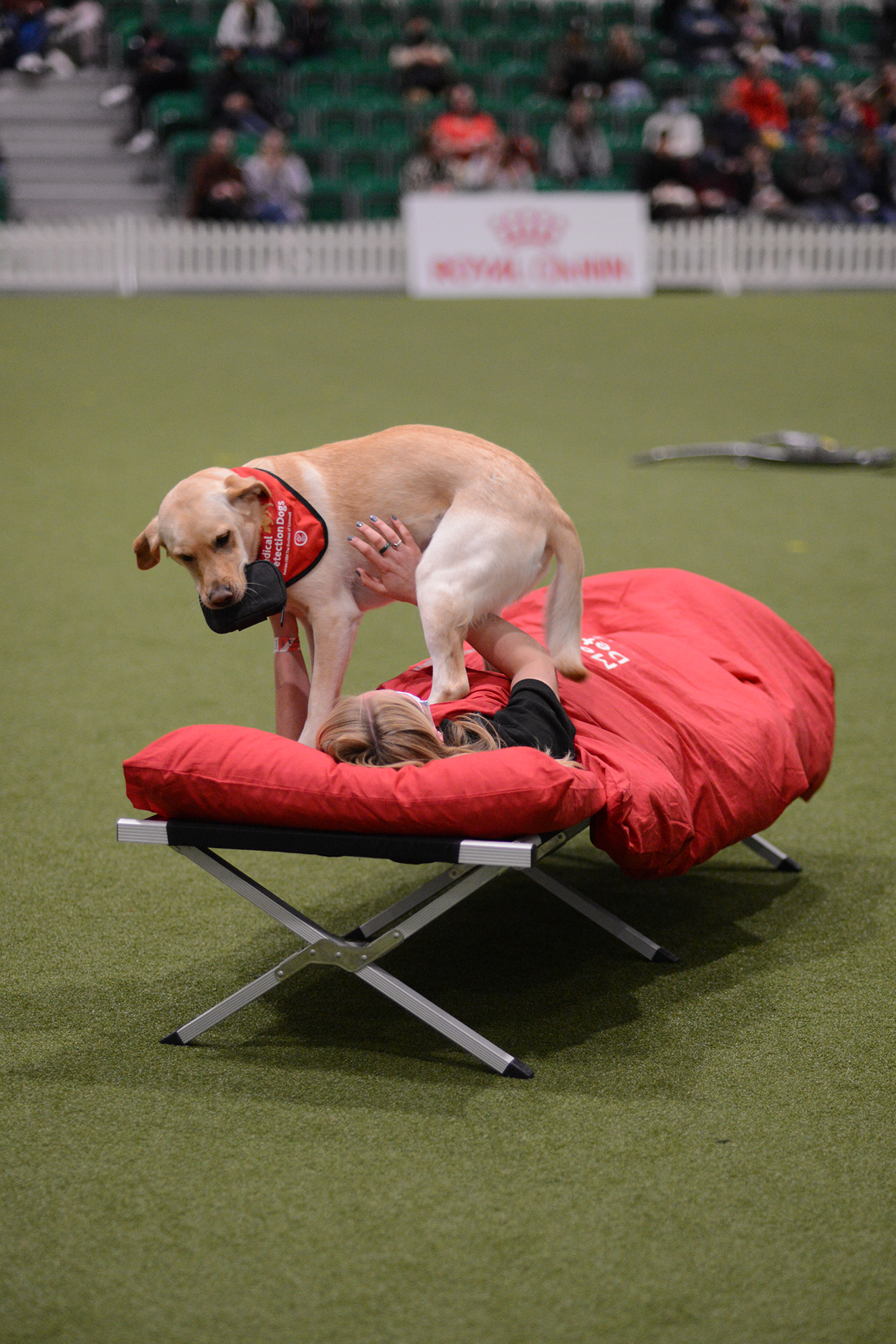
A demonstration of a dog waking its owner while holding a medical pouch in its mouth.

A medical response dog is an assistance dog trained to assist an individual who has a medical disability. Typically, they are dogs whose job does not handle primarily epilepsy or psychiatric-based conditions, though some seizure response dogs or psychiatric service dogs may also be referred to as medical response.

Many medical response dogs "alert" their handlers to conditions before they occur. For example, diabetes alert dogs partnered with diabetic persons may be trained to detect when the handler's blood sugar becomes too high or low. In addition to or in the absence of this training, medical response dogs are also often trained skills to help in their handlers' symptoms, such as bringing medications or a telephone, providing bracing and other mobility assistance, or any other number of tasks.

Many medical response dogs may be trained by an organization or by their handler. Like all assistance dogs, they must be of a particular work-loving personality and be properly socialized if expected to work in public. There are no breed or size restrictions other than those directly related to the tasks needed.

The allowed public accessibility of medical response dogs varies from region to region. In general, areas with laws protecting the usage of guide dogs and other assistance dogs, such as in the United States, also cover medical response dogs as well. According to ADA law in the United States, medical response dogs are guaranteed access to any facility in which the public is allowed to enter. Owners and staff of establishments are not permitted to inquire about or request proof of an assistance dog handler's disability, require the handler to provide documentation regarding the dog's training, or ask that the dog perform tasks to prove the dog's ability. Laws concerning assistance dogs and air travel differ from ADA laws and are set by the U.S. Department of Transportation. The rules established in 2020 by the U.S. Department of Transportation allow airlines to require the submission of forms attesting to the dog's health, temperament, training, and ability to relieve itself in a sanitary manner

== See also ==
- Working dog – Dog trained to perform practical tasks
- Mercy dog
