= Hearing dog =

Type of assistance dog trained to listen for sounds

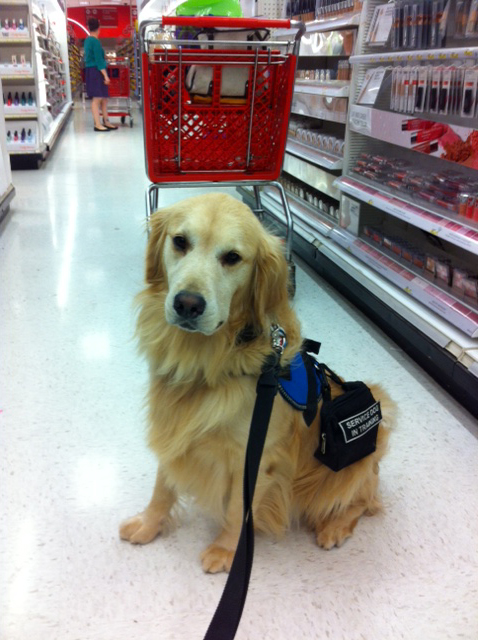
Service dog out shopping at a Target.

A hearing dog is a specialized assistance dog specifically selected and trained to assist people who are deaf or hard of hearing by alerting their handler to important sounds, such as doorbells, smoke alarms, ringing telephones, or alarm clocks. They may also work outside the home, alerting their handler to sounds such as sirens, forklifts, and a person calling the handler's name.

== Training ==
Dogs that may become hearing dogs are tested for proper temperament and willingness to work. After passing initial screenings, they are trained in basic obedience and exposed to things they will face in public areas, such as elevators, shopping carts, and different types of people. They are also trained in audio-response training, where they are exposed to different house appliances or other noises, like doorbells. These results are then logged. Only after that period of socializing and audio-response training are they then considered to be fully trained in sound alerting.

Hearing dogs may be trained professionally in as little as three months, though many are trained for at least a year. Generally, training involves getting the dog to recognize a particular sound and then physically alert or lead their handler to the source. They may also be taught to physically alert to and/or lead away from a sound, such as in the case of a fire alarm.

Some deaf or hearing-impaired individuals train their own hearing dogs. However, such dogs might not meet the requirements as stipulated by Assistance Dogs International, and therefore might not have full access to all public spaces and places afforded by such accreditation.

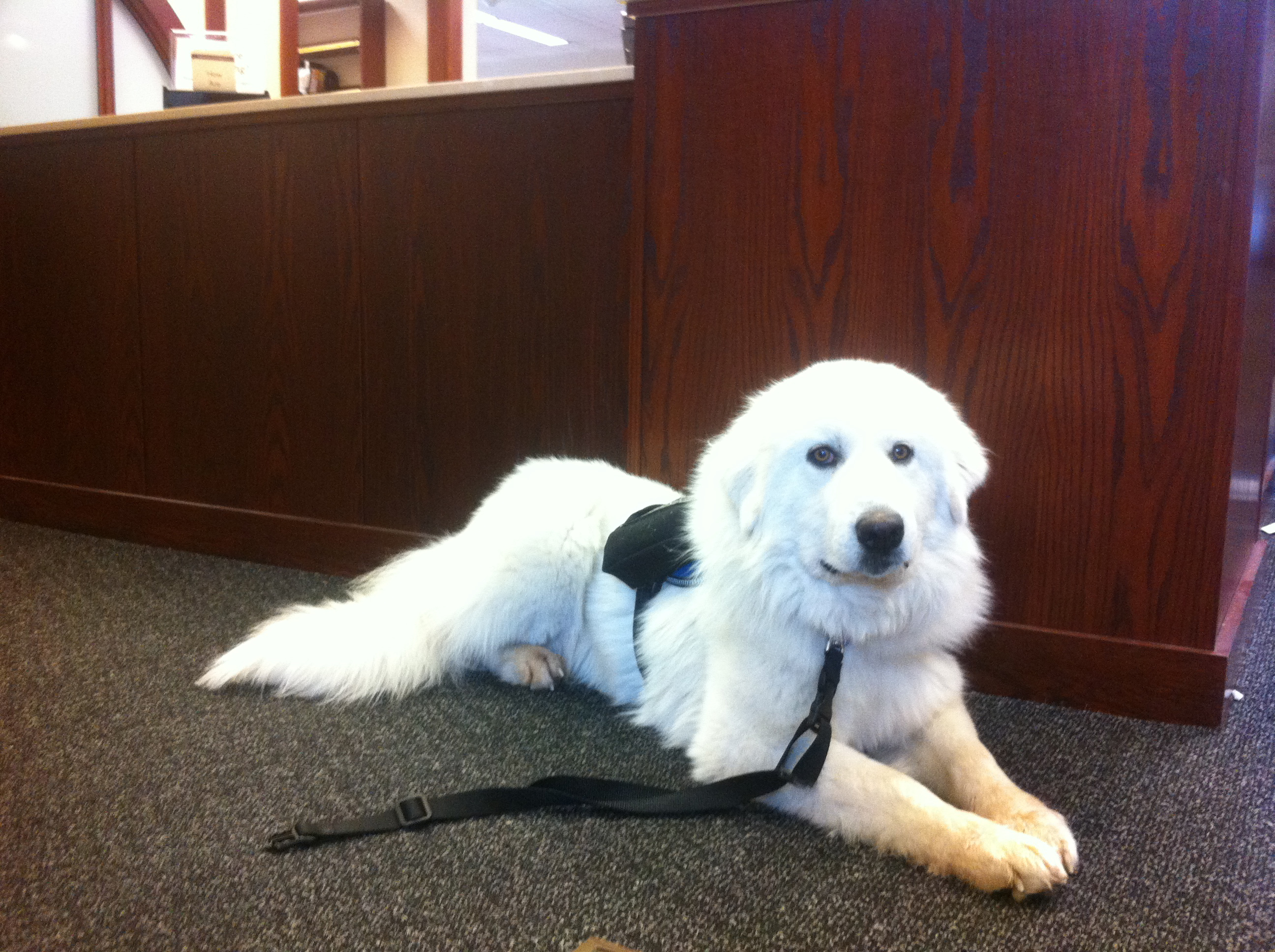
Service Dog in down-stay while handler is busy checking out books at library.

== Accessibility ==
In the United States, Title III of the Americans with Disabilities Act of 1990 allows hearing dogs, along with guide and service dogs, access to anywhere the general public is permitted. The Fair Housing Act allows hearing dogs as well as other types of assistance animals to visit and live in housing developments that have no pets policies. The U.S. Department of Housing and Urban Development's Office of Fair Housing and Equal Opportunity investigates complaints from the public alleging denials of reasonable accommodation requests involving assistance animals. Some state laws also provide access protection or additional guidelines, such as fines or criminal penalties for interfering with or denying access to a hearing dog team.

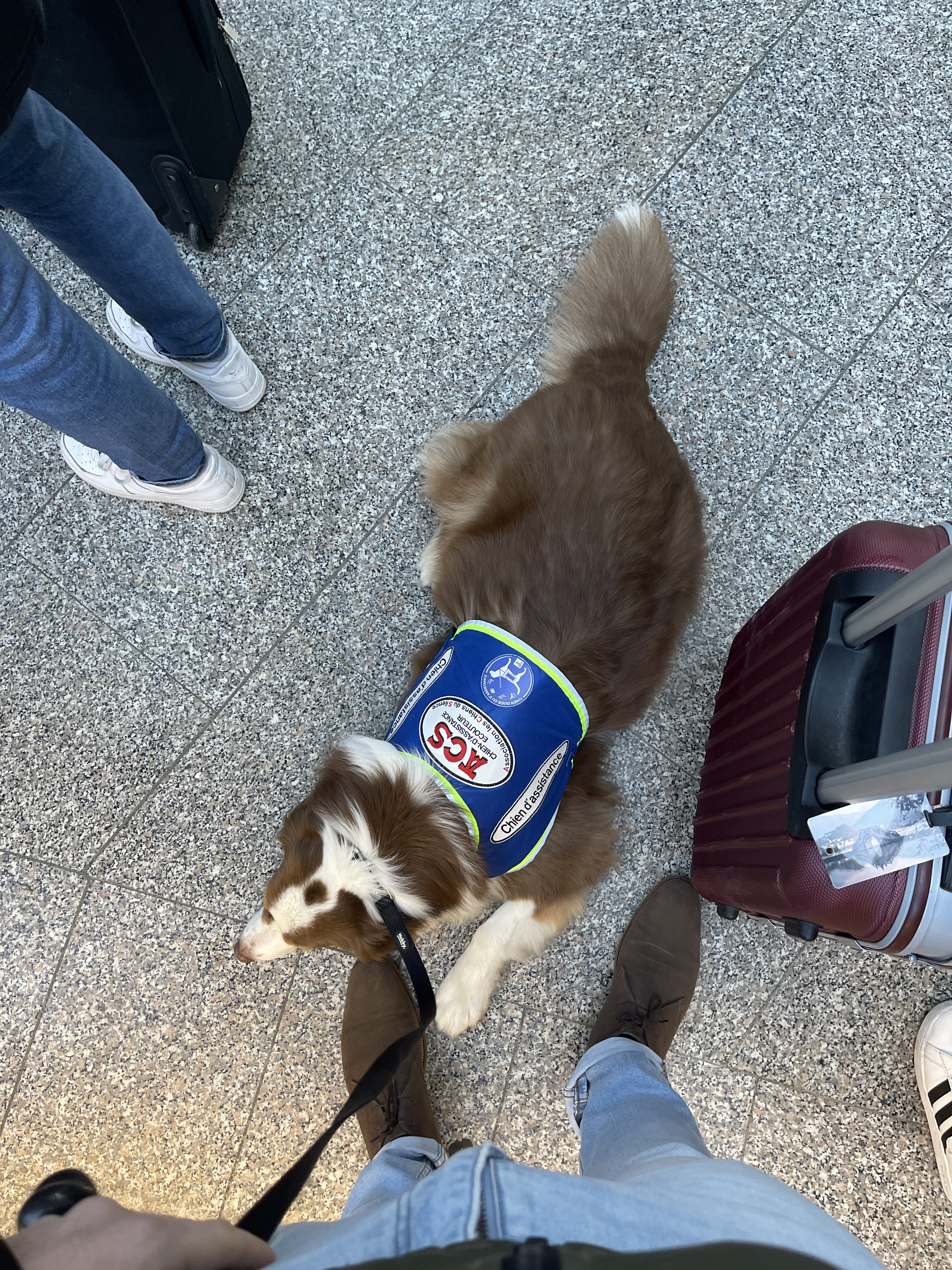
A French hearing dog, waiting to board a train with its specific jacket

Hearing dogs, and other service dogs, may wear a cape or jacket signifying service animal status, which may bear the name, logo, or other mark identifying the organization that trained the animal. This may, in some countries or regions, create a de facto color code for service dogs providing different types of assistance. In the United States, service dogs are not legally required to have or wear any badge, leash, collar, or any other identifying item.

In the United Kingdom, hearing dogs wear distinctive burgundy jackets bearing the logo of the charity (Hearing Dogs for Deaf People) which trains and funds them.

In Australia, hearing dogs are trained through Australian Lions Hearing Dogs. They wear a bright orange leash, collar, and harness to identify them, and carry with them an issued ID. They are legally permitted access to any locations that are open to members of the public, so long as they are with their handler.

In France, these dogs are trained by the Association les Chiens du Silence since 2010. They wear a distinctive blue jacket with the logo of the association, their status ("service dog" or "service dog in training") and the official guide and service dog logo. Their owner also carries an ID card. They are allowed everywhere, with very few exceptions like hospitals (for sanitary reasons), as the law of the country is quite strict on this.

Some breeds notable for selection as hearing dogs include Golden Retrievers, poodles, Cocker Spaniels, Labrador Retrievers, Australian Shepherds and cockapoos.

== See also ==
- Dogs for Deaf and Disabled Americans
- Hearing Dogs for Deaf People
- Assistance dog
- Canine Companions for Independence
