= Seizure response dog =

Assists person during or immediately before or after a seizure

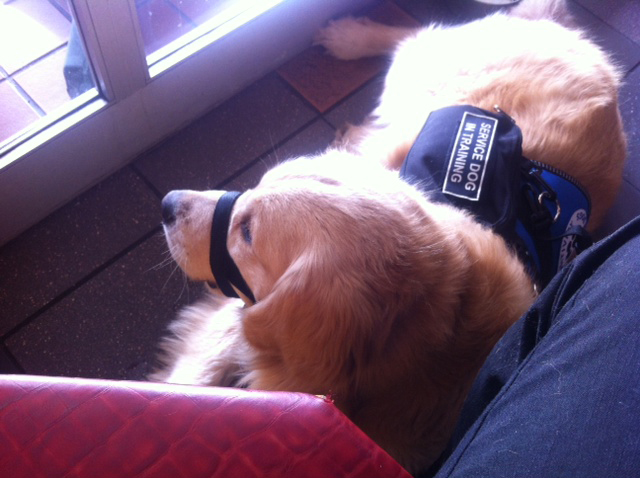
A Seizure Response Dog, like this Golden Retriever, can be brought to restaurants or other businesses.

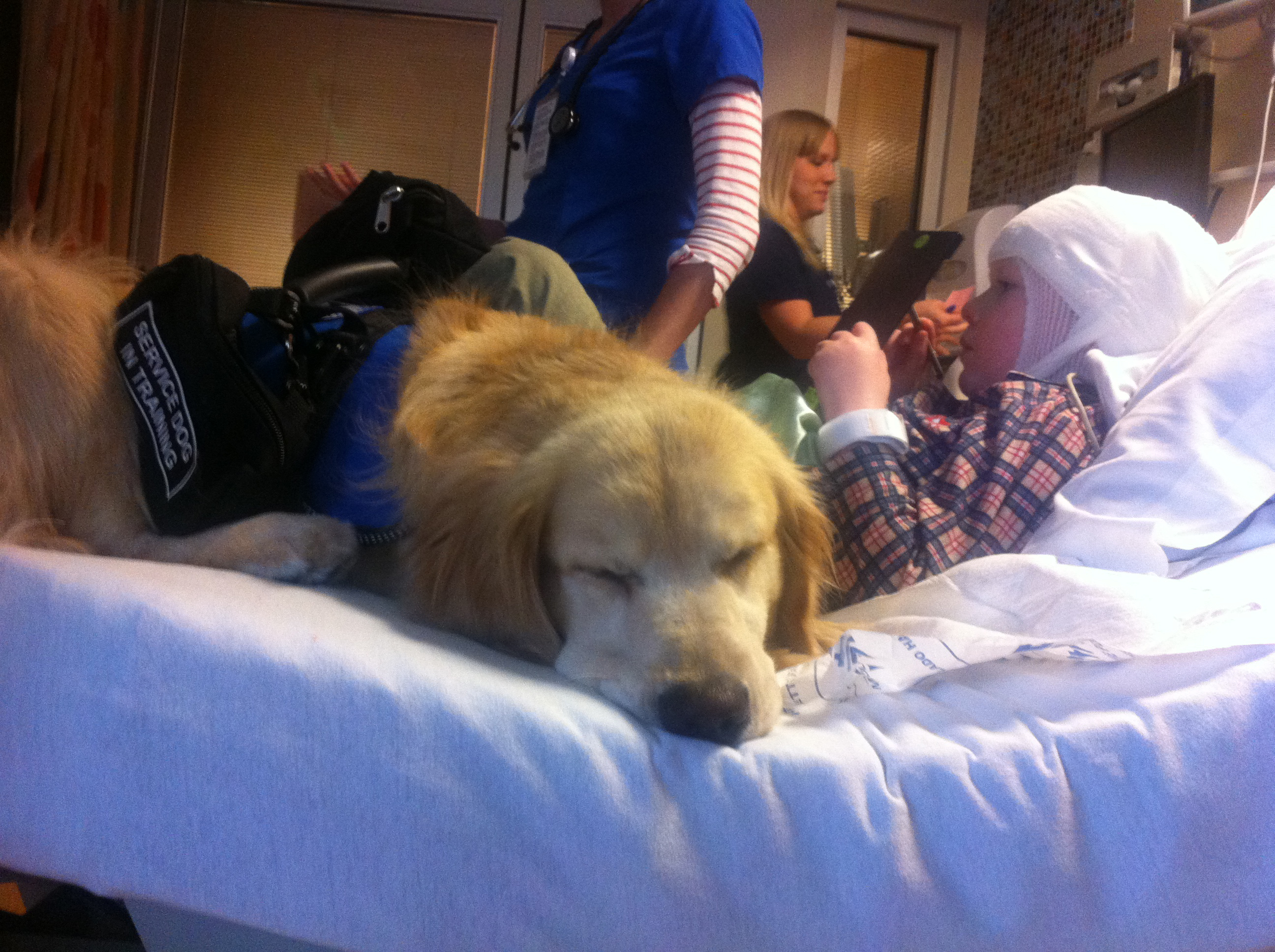
Golden Retriever service dog for a boy with autism and seizures calms him during hospital stay.

A seizure response dog (SRD) (also known as seizure dog) is a dog demonstrating specific assisting behaviour during or immediately after a person's epileptic seizure or other seizure. When reliably trained such dogs can serve as service dogs for people with epilepsy.

== Tasks ==
Tasks for seizure dogs may include, but are not limited to:

- Find someone to help
- Activate an emergency response system
- Stimulate a person to help them "wake up" after a seizure
- Use body weight to keep the person in a specific position
- Act as a brace to help the person up
- Retrieve a phone or medication
- Physically remove the patient from an unsafe situation (e.g., the middle of a street)

=== Seizure alert dog ===
A dog demonstrating specific behaviour prior to a person's epileptic seizure is also referred to as seizure alert dog (SAD). Reports suggest that some dogs can be trained to anticipate epileptic seizures. However, this ability has been questioned.

Seizure response and seizure alerting behaviour may spontaneously develop in dogs living with children and adults with epilepsy.

== See also ==
- Working dog – Dog trained to perform practical tasks
- Working animal – Domesticated animals for assisting people
