= Mobility assistance dog =

Type of service dog

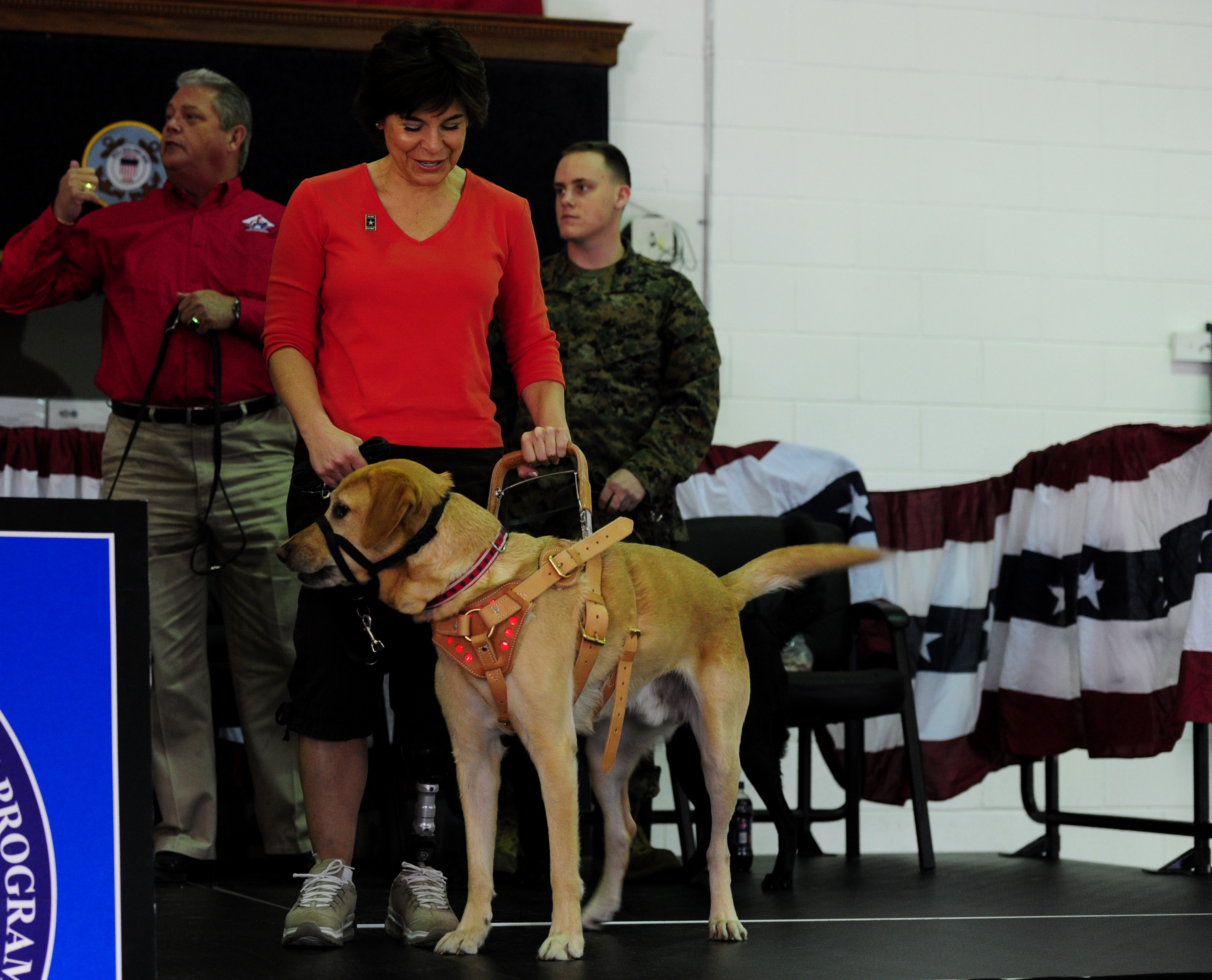
Mobility assistance dog

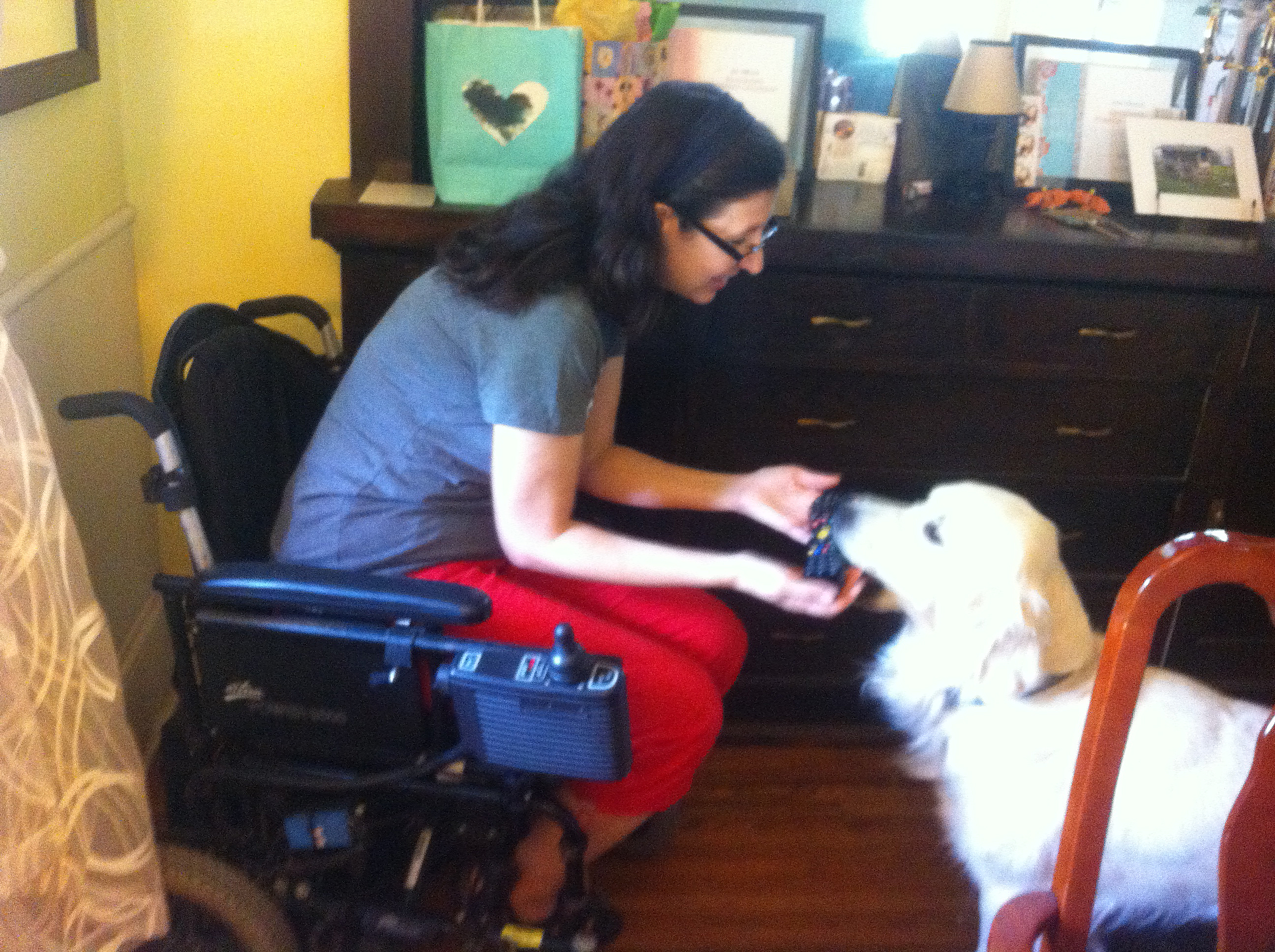
Bringing dropped object to person in wheelchair.

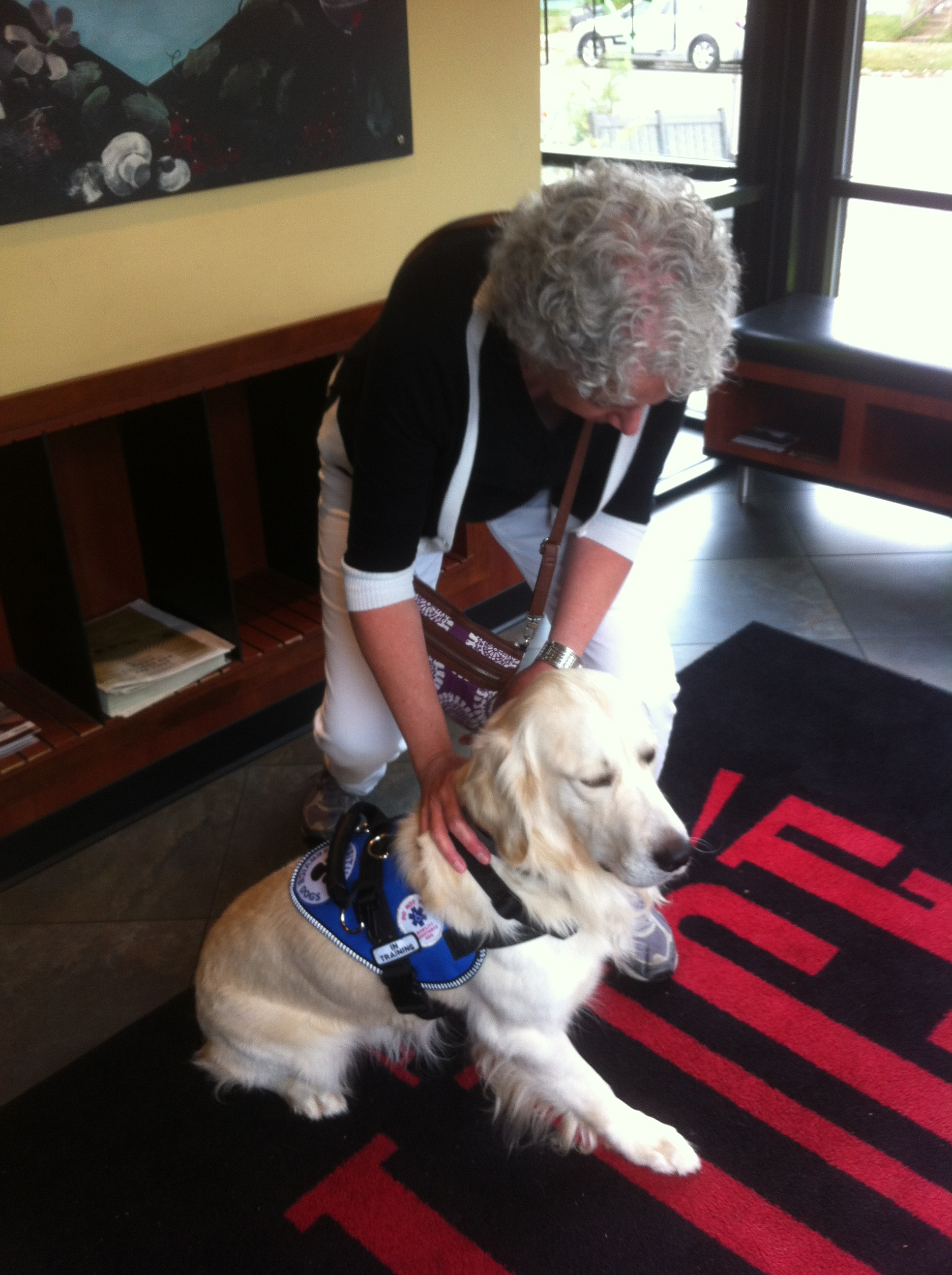
Mobility service doing "brace" so handler can push herself upright.

A mobility assistance dog or mobility service dog is a dog trained to assist a physically disabled person who has mobility issues, such as poor balance or being a non-ambulatory wheelchair user. Roles include "providing balance and stability" picking up and carrying objects, pulling wheelchairs, opening and closing doors, and operating light switches. Mobility assistance dogs can have significant positive impacts on the lives of their handlers.

Some larger-statured dogs with sound joints are trained to pull individuals in wheelchairs, and wear a type of harness specifically designed for pulling. However, wheelchair pulling remains controversial. Many US programs limit "wheelchair pulling" to short straight distances, most commonly for assistance getting in and out of a crosswalk. One study has found that using the traction provided by the service dog has physical benefits because manual wheelchair users can operate their chairs with less effort.

Another type of mobility assistance dog task is "counter-balance". They are used for Parkinson's disease and multiple sclerosis patients, along with other disorders and conditions. The handler does not put full weight on the dog. However, the dog can greatly assist a person with their gait and balance while walking. It can also be helpful for those with symptoms of proprioceptive sensory loss, such as an inability to walk in a straight line. These dogs usually wear a special vest so that the owner can attach a cane-like handle. This allows the dog to guide the owner and assist with their balance.

Mobility assistance dogs are trained to perform specific, task-based actions that directly mitigate their handler's disability — and are protected under the Americans with Disabilities Act (ADA).

== See also ==
- Working dog – Dog trained to perform practical tasks
