= Feral pig =

Any type of feral domesticated pig, wild boar, or hybrid

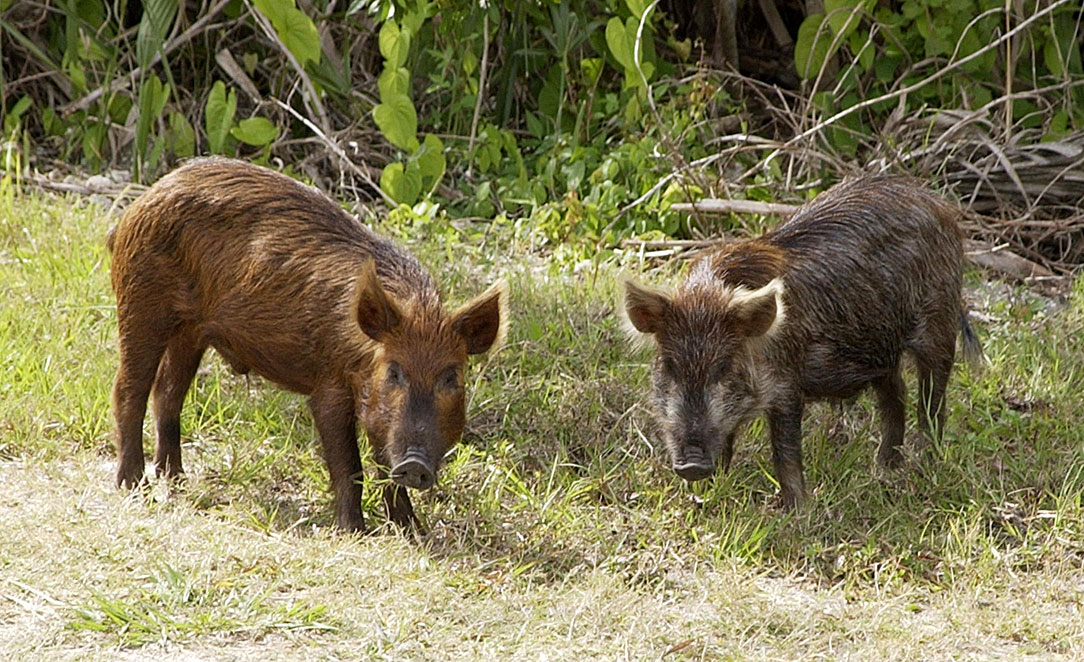
Two wild pigs near Kennedy Space Center, Florida

A feral pig (Sus scrofa) is a domestic pig which has gone feral, meaning it lives in the wild. The term feral pig has also been applied to wild boars, which can interbreed with domestic pigs. They are found mostly in the Americas and Australia. Razorback and wild hog are sometimes used in the United States in reference to feral pigs or boar–pig hybrids. They are listed as a National Invasive Species by the United States Department of Agriculture

== Definition ==
A feral pig is a domestic pig that has escaped or been released into the wild, and is living more or less as a wild animal, or one that is descended from such animals. Zoologists generally exclude from the feral category undomesticated animals that have escaped or been released from captivity. Accordingly, Eurasian wild boars that have been deliberately or accidentally introduced into habitats where they are not native, such as in North America, are not technically feral, although they may interbreed with feral pigs.

== Characteristics ==
Adult feral pigs generally weigh from 75 to 250 pounds, reaching around 3 ft tall and 5 ft long. Some pigs can reach twice the average size, and males are larger than females. Their coat is notably thicker than a domestic pig's. made up of coarse and bristly hair. While their coat color varies due to crossbreeding, the most common color is black. Piglets are born with patterns and spots as they move through maturity. A male is referred to as a boar, a female who has given birth is referred to as a sow, and a female who hasn't had a litter is referred to as a gilt. As a result of descending from domestic pigs, feral pigs have much of the same build; however, there are distinct differences. Feral pigs have a barrel-shaped stout body with short, stocky legs. Similar to a domestic pig, they have a snout and a short tail. Both male and female hogs have canines, males having enlarged canines that significantly protrude from the mouth.

The skull of a feral pig is much denser than that of domestic pig. Due to less consistent nutrition, the major limbs of a hog are smaller than the domestic pigs limbs. Wild pigs may occasionally be "mule-footed" (a condition known as syndactyly where the distal-most bones of the two middle digits of the foot are fused). Though uncommon, the condition has been cited as early as 350 BCE. The prevalence of syndactyly in feral hogs is not clearly understood, though it seems to be decreasing. They also possess neck wattles (or "waddles" or "tassels") which are gristle protuberances that grow out of the lower portion of the neck.

== Distribution and habitat ==
Feral pigs have a vast distribution across the world, found on all continents and most islands. In North America, there is an estimated population of 4 to 11 million individuals. In South America, the population is estimated at up to 47,400 individuals and is highly concentrated in agricultural regions. The population in Australia was measured at 3.2 million in the 2000s. The largest population, however, resides in Europe where the total population is estimated between 13.5 and 19.6 million individuals.

The feral pig population across the world is only expected to grow as the species' reproductive rate is considered the highest among wild ungulate. With a gestation period of 115 days and the ability to have 1-2 litters of up to 13 piglets a year, sows are incredibly fertile beginning at a young age. The average hog reaches sexual maturity at around 6 months of age. In optimal conditions, wild hog populations have been known to double, or even triple, in size within a year.

One of the reasons that hogs are one of the most successful, widespread invasive mammalian species is their ability to thrive in a wide range of habitats. Hogs can adapt to both hot and cold weather and are opportunistic omnivores. Feral pigs tend to prefer areas with a water supply nearby as well as dense vegetation; however, they can survive in dry areas. Hogs don't extensively migrate, instead, they stay within defined ranges. During dry season the average distance traveled from a general home range increases as feral pigs travel farther for food and water.

The feral pig is assessed as Least Concern on the IUCN Red List and listed as a National Invasive Species by the United States Department of Agriculture.

== Behavior ==
Feral pigs are highly social, intelligent, and adaptable. They live in matriarchal groups, consisting of sows and their young, called "sounders" in which the sows collaborate to raise their piglets. Sounders generally contain around 20 hogs with frequently varying numbers. Once they reach sexual maturity, males leave the sounder to live in smaller groups or as individuals, while females form their own sounders. Inside a sounder, hierarchy is based on age, meaning the oldest sows in the group tend to lead. Because of the distinct levels of dominance, fights within sounders rarely occur. In contrast to the interactions within sounders, boars fight frequently over breeding and resources, sometimes resulting in death of individuals.

While hogs are naturally diurnal, active during the day, hunting and human activity forced a shift towards nocturnal behavior. Hogs interact with one another with body language, scent, and up to 20 distinct sounds. They act in cooperative ways, sharing maternal responsibilities, huddling for warmth, and engaging in social development.

== Ecological impacts ==
Feral pigs impact their environments in many ways, both positive and negative. Negative impacts include soil disturbance, predation, competition, water quality disturbance, disease transmission, agricultural and economical damage. Positive impacts include improving biodiversity, dispersing seeds, reforming habitats, and recycling nutrients.

Feral pigs are widely distributed and naturalized due to their high adaptability and reproductive rates. A wide range of native fauna and flora suffer predations, competitions, and habitat degradations from feral pigs. Hogs are responsible for the extinction and endangerment of a multitude of taxa, threatening 672 species around the world. Notable species that suffer directly from feral pigs include the sea turtle, prairie chicken, Houston toad, and Hine's emerald dragonfly. Destructive habits of feral pigs like wallowing and rooting cause erosion and water contamination. As a result of wallowing, hogs introduce fecal material, bacteria, and diseases such as E. coli into water resources that animals in surrounding habitats use. Rooting increases loss of nutrients and destroys vegetation which leads to erosion. These changes to the landscape present risk for flooding.

While feral pigs are considered an invasive species and are widely known for their destructive effects on the environment, studies are finding that they have benefits to offer to the environment as well. Their nesting habits, which uproot seedlings, can benefit biodiversity by allowing rarer plant species an opportunity to grow in areas where one species might dominate. Changes to a habitat due to wallowing can offer new environments in which other species can thrive, such as the creation of muddy pools for amphibians to breed in. This alteration of ecosystems impairs one species ability to survive while offering another the chance to thrive, encourage overall biodiversity. Arguably, introduced swine may have some roles in both once-native and exotic habitats, to contain introduced plants and to refill vacant niches to some extent (such as that of prehistoric peccaries in North and South Americas).

== Fatal attacks on human beings ==
Feral pigs can be dangerous to people, particularly when the pigs travel in herds with their young, and should be avoided when possible. Feral pigs living in the United States have been known to attack without provocation and fatally injure human beings. There have been over 100 documented attacks by feral pigs on human beings in the United States between the years 1825 and 2012. Of these attacks, five have been fatal. Three of the five fatal attacks were by feral pigs wounded by hunters. Both male and female feral pigs are known to attack without provocation, and attacks by solitary males, as well as group attacks have been documented.

On November 26, 2019, a 59-year-old Texas woman named Christine Rollins was attacked and killed only a few feet away from the front door of her workplace by a herd of feral pigs in the town of Anahuac, Texas, which is 50 miles east of Houston. This incident was the fifth documented fatal feral pig attack in the United States since 1825. Chambers County Sheriff Brian Hawthorne in a formal statement to news media stated that "multiple hogs" assaulted Rollins during pre-dawn hours between 6 and 6:30 a.m. when it was still dark outside. The victim died of blood loss as a result of her injuries.

== North America ==
=== Continental United States ===
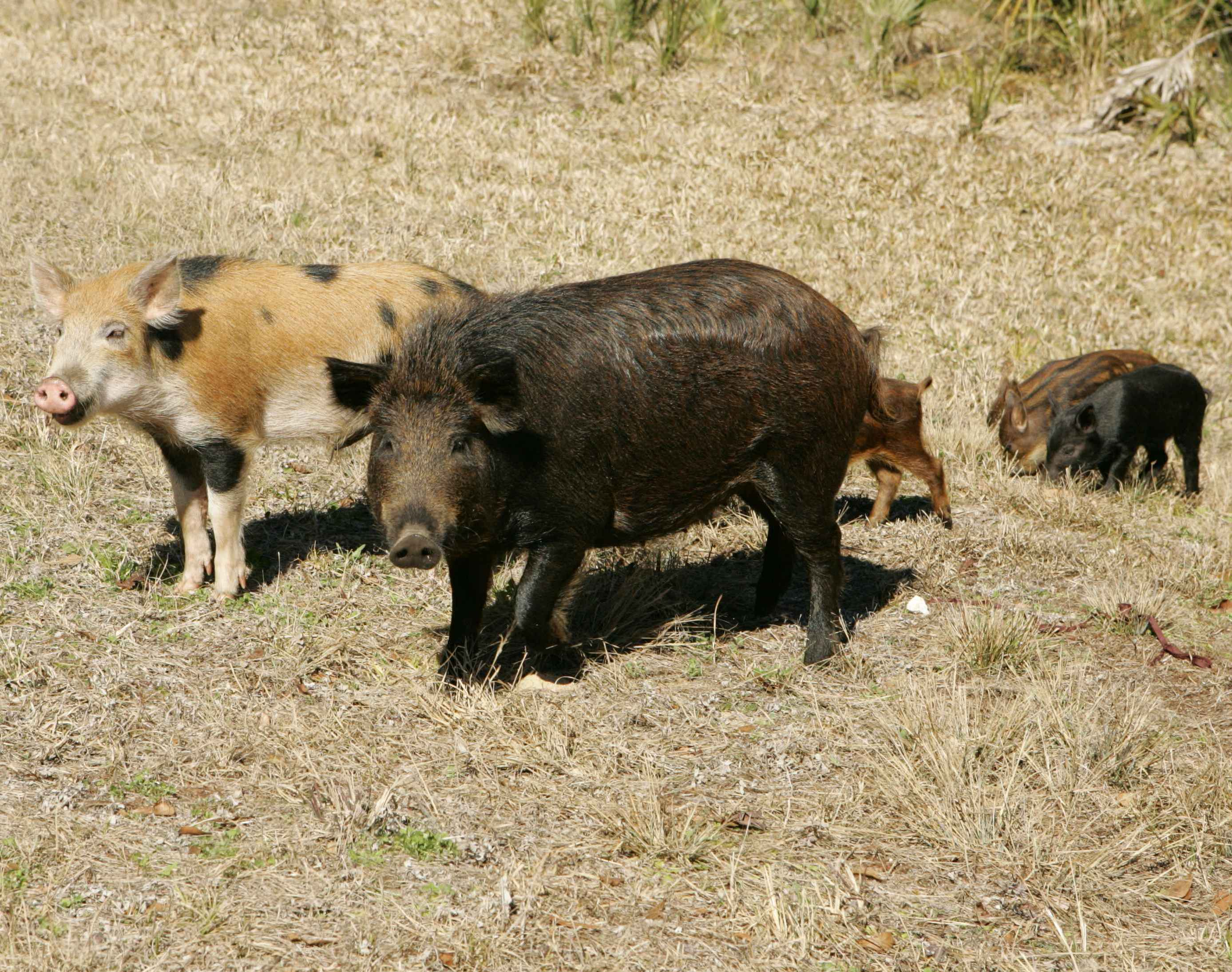
A family of wild pigs, U.S. Fish and Wildlife Service

Domestic pigs were first introduced to the Americas in the 16th century. Christopher Columbus intentionally released domestic swine in the West Indies during his second voyage to provide future expeditions with a freely available food supply. Hernando de Soto is known to have introduced Eurasian domestic swine to Florida in 1539, though it is possible that Juan Ponce de León had already introduced the first pigs into mainland Florida in 1521.

The practice of introducing domestic pigs into the New World persisted throughout the exploration periods of the 16th and 17th centuries. The Eurasian wild boar (S. s. scrofa), which originally ranged from Great Britain to European Russia, may have also been introduced. By the 19th century, their numbers were sufficient in some areas such as the Southern United States to become a common game animal.

Feral pigs are a growing problem in the United States and also on the southern prairies in Canada. As of 2013, the estimated population of 6 million feral pigs causes billions of dollars in property and agricultural damage every year in the United States, both in wild and agricultural lands. Their ecological damage may be equally problematic with 26% lower vertebrate species richness in forest fragments they have invaded. Because pigs forage by rooting for their food under the ground with their snouts and tusks, a group of feral pigs can damage acres of planted fields in just a few nights. As an omnivore, it is a danger to both plants and animals endemic to the area it is invading. Game animals such as deer and turkeys, and more specifically, flora such as the Opuntia plant have been especially affected by the feral hog's aggressive competition for resources. Feral pigs have been determined to be potential hosts for at least 34 pathogens that can be transmitted to livestock, wildlife, and humans. For commercial pig farmers, great concern exists that some of the hogs could be a vector for swine fever to return to the U.S., which has been extinct in America since 1978. Feral pigs could also present an immediate threat to "nonbiosecure" domestic pig facilities because of their likeliness to harbor and spread pathogens, particularly the protozoan Sarcocystis.

The population of feral pigs has increased from 2 million pigs ranging over 20 states in 1990, to triple that number 25 years later, ranging over 38 states with new territories expanding north into Oregon, Pennsylvania, Ohio, and New Hampshire. Some of these feral pigs have mixed with escaped Russian boars that have been introduced for hunters since the early 1990s.

Feral pigs are opportunistic omnivores, with about 85%-90% of their diet being plant matter, and the remainder animal. Plants have difficulties regenerating from their wallowing, as North American flora did not evolve to withstand the destruction caused by rooting pigs, unlike European or Asian flora. Feral pigs in the U.S. eat small animals, mostly invertebrates like insects and worms but also vertebrates such as wild turkey poults, toads, tortoises, and the eggs of reptiles and birds. This can deprive other wildlife that normally would feed upon these important food sources.

In some cases, other wildlife are out-competed by the feral pigs' higher reproductive rate; a sow can become pregnant as early as six months old and bear multiple litters of piglets yearly. In the autumn, other animals such as the American black bear compete directly with feral pigs as both forage for tree mast (the fruit of forest trees). These are likely reasons that they reduce diversity when they invade.

In the U.S., the problems caused by feral pigs are exacerbated by the lack of predators of pigs as well as the rapid rate at which the pigs reproduce. Predators such as bobcats and coyotes may occasionally take feral piglets or weakened animals; however, they are too small to challenge a full-grown boar that can grow to three times their weight. In Florida, feral pigs made up a significant portion of the Florida panther's diet. Other potential predators include the gray wolf, red wolf, cougar, jaguar, American alligator, American black bear, and grizzly bear. However, there are barriers to pig predation for each of these animals. The jaguar is extirpated from California and the Southwest. The grizzly bear, while native to most of the American West, is gone from the states that have large feral pig populations, namely Texas, Arizona, California, and New Mexico; and the species also has a very slow reproductive rate. The use of gray wolves for a natural and sustainable approach to eliminating invasive populations of feral pigs has been proposed. However, gray wolf numbers are small and expected to remain so as they slowly repopulate their range; only a few individuals thus far have been recorded as inhabiting California, in spite of thousands of square miles of good habitat. The cougar is present in most of the West, but is gone from the East, with no known populations east of Minnesota in the north, and very thin numbers east of Houston in the South. The American black bear is both predator and competitor, but in most areas probably may not impact feral pig populations enough to control them. Programs do exist to protect the weakened numbers of large predators in the U.S., but it is expected to take a very long time for these animals to naturally repopulate their former habitat.

By the early 2000s, the range of feral pigs included all of the U.S. south of 36° north. The range begins in the mountains surrounding California and crosses over the mountains, continuing consistently much farther east towards the Louisiana bayous and forests, terminating in the entire Florida peninsula. In the East, the range expands northward to include most of the forested areas and swamps of the Southeast, and from there goes north along the Appalachian Mountains as far as upstate New York, with a growing presence in states bordering West Virginia and Kentucky. Texas has the largest estimated population of 2.5–2.6 million feral pigs existing all counties except El Paso County, and they cause about $50 million in agriculture damage per year.

==== Hunting in the United States ====
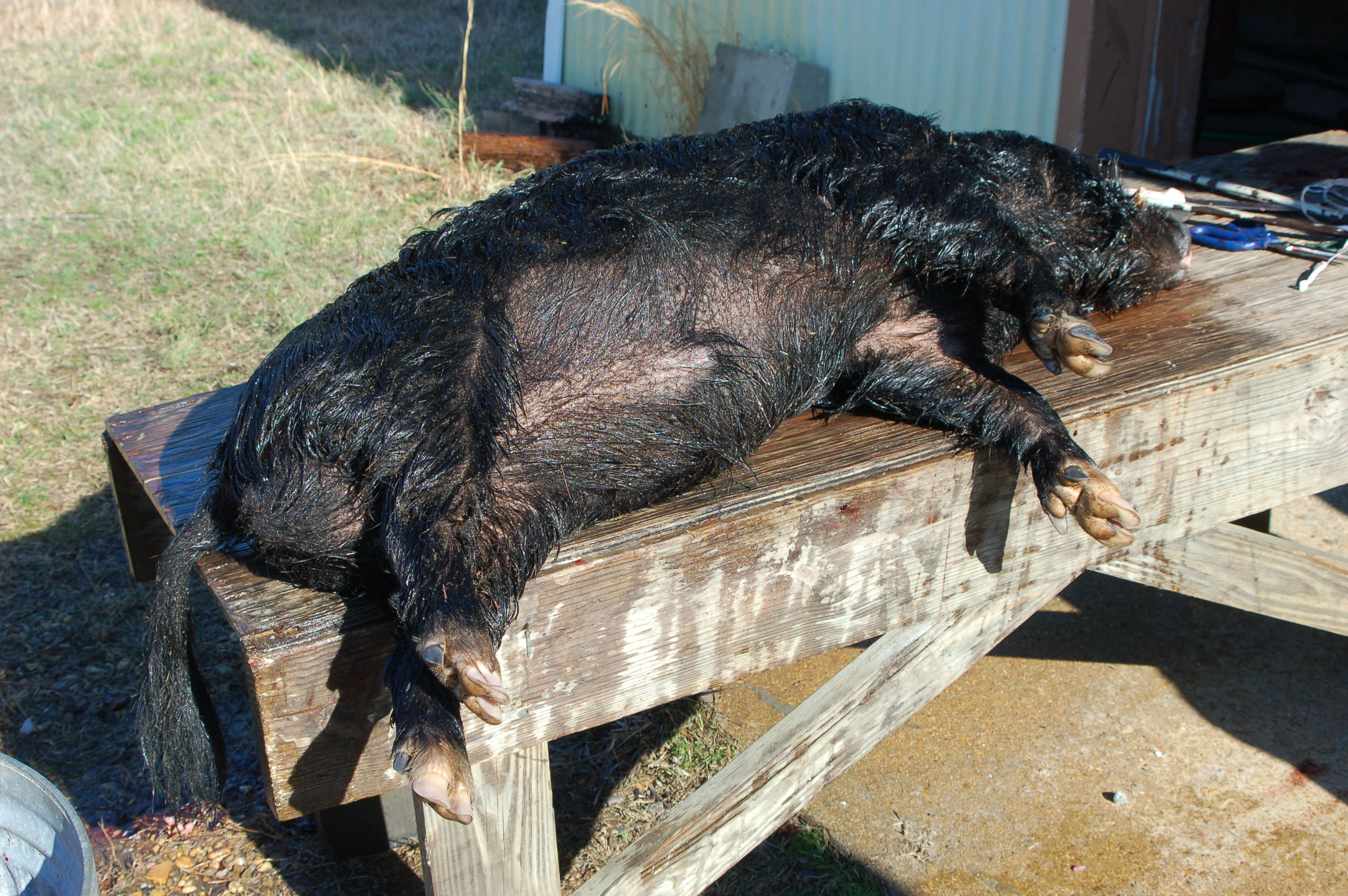
A hunted wild pig

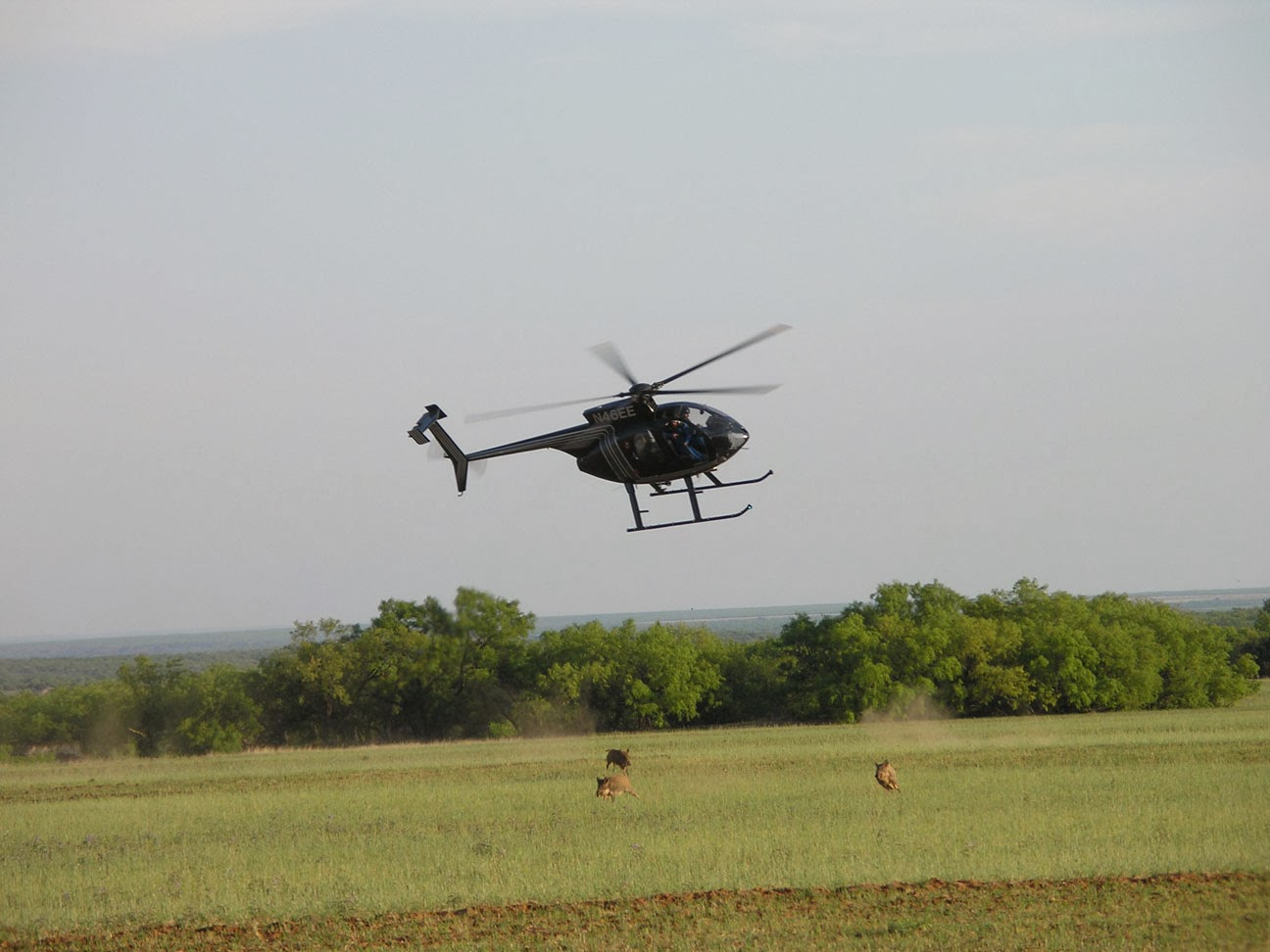
Feral pigs being shot from a helicopter, Texas Wildlife Services

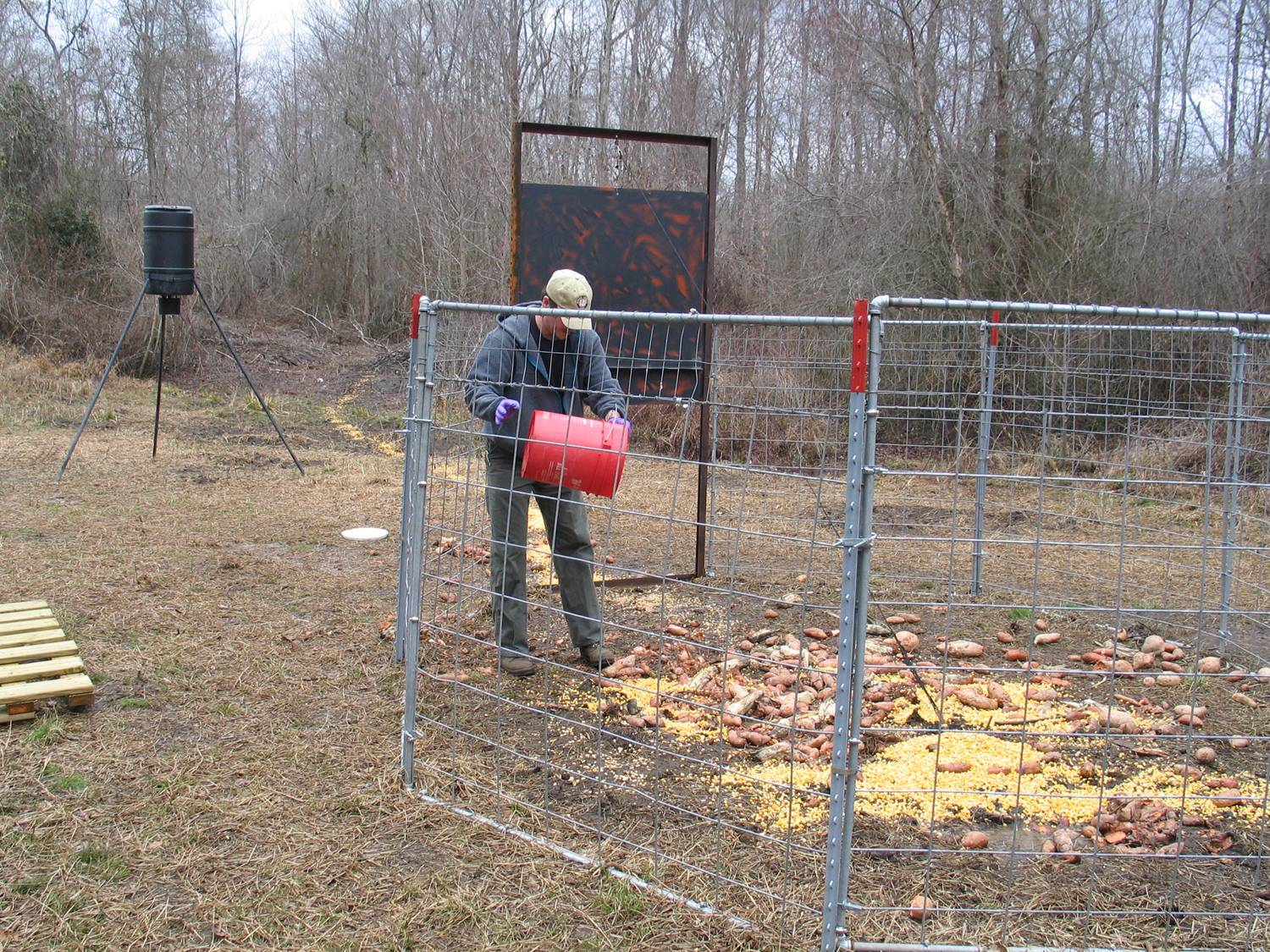
A corral-type trap being baited. Food is left to accustom pigs to using the trap as a daily food source; eventually, the gate can be triggered remotely when most or all the members of a sounder are inside the trap

To control feral pig numbers, American hunters have taken to trapping and killing as many individuals as they can. Some, in Texas, have even turned the trapping and killing of hogs into small businesses. The meat of wild pigs may be suitable for human consumption; around 461,000 animals killed in Texas between 2004 and 2009 were federally inspected and commercially sold for consumption.

Legal restrictions on methods of hunting are lax, as most state departments of wildlife openly acknowledge feral pigs as an ecological threat and some classify them as vermin. For example, the Wisconsin Department of Natural Resources considers them unprotected wild animals with no closed season or harvest limit, and promotes their aggressive removal.

Shooting pigs from a helicopter, called heli-hogging, is legal in Texas, and can be an effective method, killing as many as 9 to 27 animals per hour. Helicopters can cost from $400 to $1000 per hour to operate. These costs are managed by selling seats on these helicopter flights to recreational hunters; Texas law only requires that those buying a helicopter hunt be in possession of a hunting license. The method relies on the helicopter flushing pigs into the open where they can be targeted. In some areas, such as the Piney Woods, this may not be possible because of vegetation.

Hunting with dogs is permitted and very common; it has been practiced in the Southeast for generations. Competitions for producing the fastest bay dogs are prevalent in the South, with Uncle Earl's Hog Dog Trials in Louisiana a popular example, held every summer since 1995. Preferred scent dogs for catching feral pigs mostly are native breeds, and include the Catahoula Leopard Dog, the Blue Lacy, the Leopard Hound, all six of the Coonhound breeds, and the Blackmouth Cur.

Catch dogs typically are American Pit Bull Terriers and their crosses, the Catahoula (dual purpose), the Dogo Argentino, a dog used for the same purpose in South America, and American Bulldogs; the first of these has been put back to work as a utility breed over the past 30 years and its tenacity on the hunt and undying loyalty to protect its master have made it a popular asset. The method of hunting has little variation: usually, the hunter sends out bay dogs trained to chase the pig until it tires and then corner it; then a bigger catch dog is sent out to catch and hold down the pig, which may get aggressive, until the hunter arrives to kill it.

No single management technique alone can be totally effective at controlling feral pig populations. Harvesting 66% of the total population per year is required to keep the Texas feral pig populations stable. Best management practices suggest the use of corral traps which have the ability to capture the entire sounder of feral pigs. The federal government spends $20 million on feral pig management.

In February 2017, Texas Agriculture Commissioner Sid Miller approved the use of a pesticide called Kaput Feral Hog Lure, which is bait food laced with warfarin (a rodenticide used to kill rodents).

=== Canada ===
Feral pigs have become an invasive species in Canada, particularly in western and central regions, following their introduction as livestock in the late 1980s and early 1990s. These animals are hybrid descendants of European wild boars and domestic pigs, and have developed unique adaptations to survive in Canada's cold climate.

Canadian farmers began importing wild boars from Europe in the late 1980s and early 1990s for meat production. Some of these animals escaped from farms by digging under or breaking through fences, while others were intentionally released when the boar meat market declined. Initially dismissed as a minor concern due to assumptions about their inability to survive Canadian winters, the population has since grown and spread significantly.

These hybrid pigs can reach weights of up to 600 pounds or more, substantially larger than their European counterparts which typically weigh 220 pounds. They possess several distinctive features:

- Sharp tusks
- Bristly coats with thick, warm fur
- High cold tolerance
- Large litter sizes (up to six piglets twice per year)
- Ability to construct "pigloos" - shelter structures made from cattails for winter protection

Research conducted by the University of Saskatchewan has shown that feral pigs have spread throughout western and central Canada, from British Columbia to Manitoba. Their range has been expanding since their introduction, with significant population growth documented between 1990 and 2017.

== Oceania ==
=== Hawaii ===
A genetic analysis found that the first pigs were introduced to Hawaii by Polynesians in approximately AD 1200. Additional varieties of European pigs were introduced after Captain Cook's arrival into Hawaii in 1778, where they prey on endangered birds and plants.

=== Australia ===
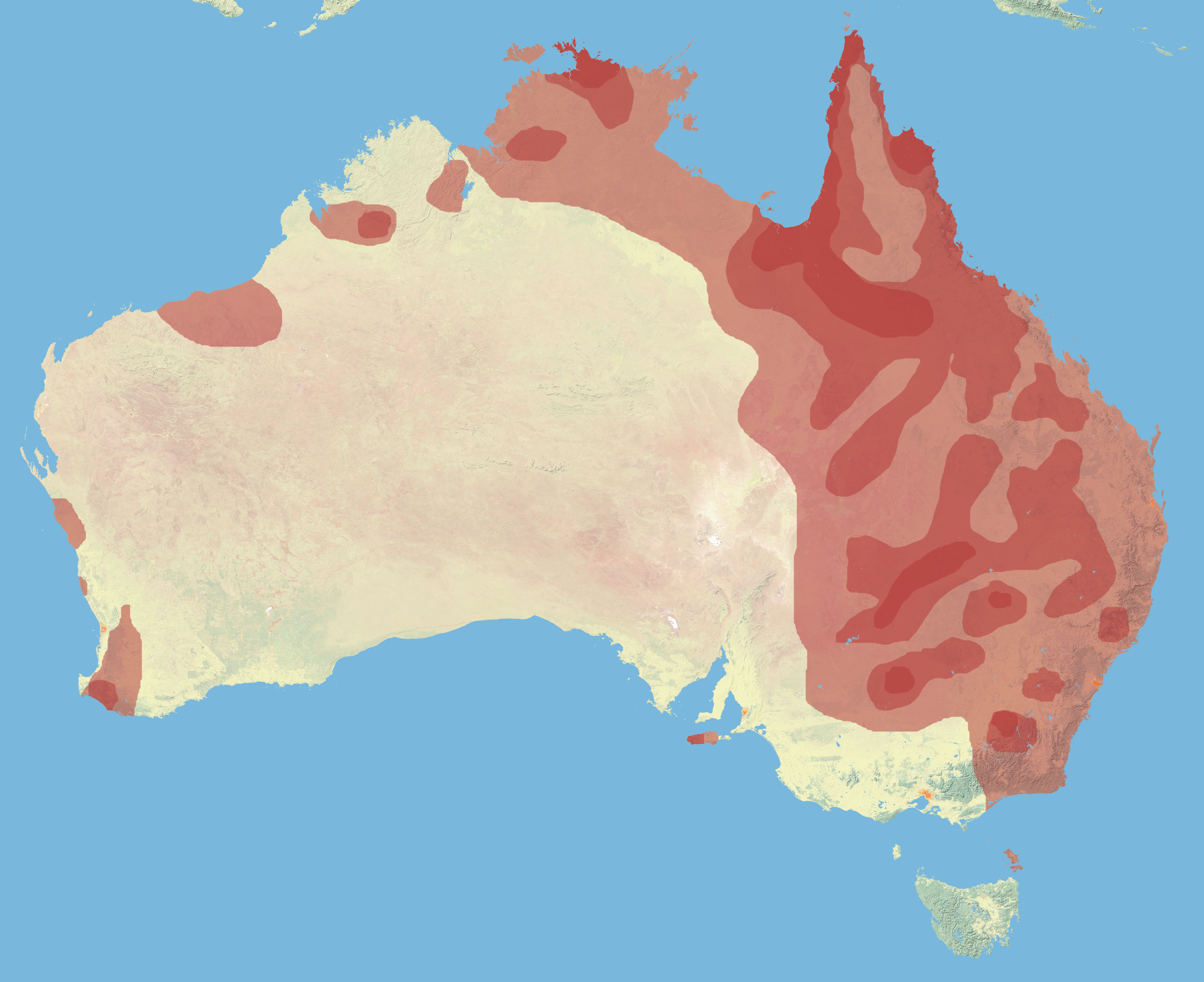
Distribution of feral pigs in Australia (2011)

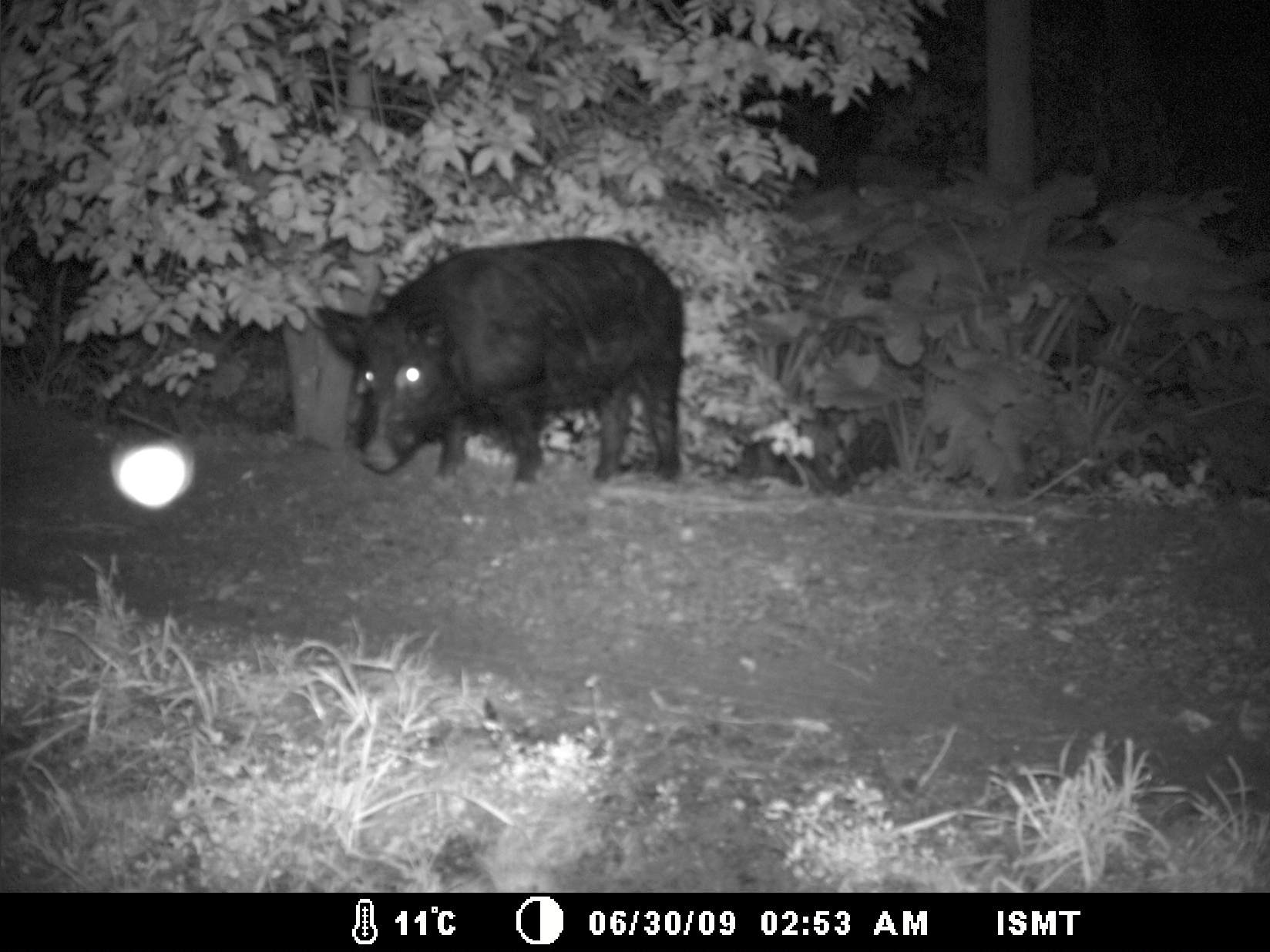
A feral pig in a back yard in Brisbane, Australia, 2009

The first recorded release of pigs in Australia was made by Captain James Cook at Adventure Bay, Bruny Island in 1777. This was part of his policy of introducing animals and plants to newly discovered countries. The deliberate introduction of pigs into previously pig-free areas seems to have been common at the time. In 1803, French explorer Nicolas Baudin introduced pigs to Kangaroo Island, South Australia. As recently as the early 1970s, pigs were introduced to Babel Island, off the east coast of Flinders Island. These pigs were eradicated by Department of Agriculture staff with local assistance. It is possible that pigs were released when the ship City of Foo Chow went ashore on the northeast coast of Flinders Island in March 1877. On Flinders Island, damage to farmers was considered to be minor as of 1987. However, in the Strzelecki National Park on the island, the ecosystem had been severely damaged by 1987; extensive rooting in the gullies led to water erosion and loss of regenerating forest plants. The population of approximately 10,000 Kangaroo Island feral pigs were almost eradicated by the 2019–20 bushfires on the island. After this, 878 feral pigs were removed through aerial culling, ground shooting, detector dogs, and baiting. After three sows were destroyed in March 2024, there were no further sightings before June 2026, when the island was declared officially free of the pest.

Since 1987, feral pigs have been considered to be the most important mammalian pest of Australian agriculture. They are considered as pests in every state and territory of Australia, Environmental Threat of National Significance, endangering around 150 nationally listed threatened species. They are present (estimated 13 and 24 million in number) across around 45% of mainland Australia, with particularly high densities in Queensland, New South Wales, the Northern Territory, and Western Australia. In July 2026, it was reported that numbers were booming in the northern part of South Australia, after floods in Queensland had reached the state, appearing in areas that had previously been free of the animals.

They have a major impact on farmers' livelihoods, as they eat new-born lambs; damage water sources, fences, and pasture; and eat crops. Another threat posed by the pigs is that they are susceptible to diseases not present in Australia, including foot-and-mouth disease, African swine fever, and classical swine fever, and if an outbreak occurred in the feral population, the effect on livestock in Australia could be devastating. They are also vectors for brucellosis and Japanese encephalitis virus.

A threat abatement plan (TAP) was first introduced by the federal government in 2005, reviewed in 2011 and revised in 2017. Control options are mainly aerial and ground shooting, baiting, and trapping. Baiting is thought to be the most cost-effective; recreational hunting has not proved effective. The total economic cost of feral pigs to Australia has been conservatively estimated at over A$100 million per year, when agricultural losses, environmental damage, and control and management programmes are taken into account.

Feral pigs may be a new food source for saltwater crocodiles, helping to boost their population.

=== New Zealand ===
In New Zealand, feral pigs are regularly seen in and around the island nation's capital of Wellington. They have been documented killing and consuming newborn and juvenile dairy goats kept on farms, separating the youngest goats from the rest of the herd; the feral pigs (which usually raid the farms under cover of darkness) threaten any guard dogs present into submission, in order to attack and eat the goat kids.

The pigs also damage the nesting sites of New Zealand's endemic wildlife, including kiwi and other ground-nesting and flightless birds, and may target chicks and eggs for food, as well as adult birds.

== South America ==
In South America, during the early 20th century, free-ranging boars were introduced in Uruguay for hunting purposes and eventually crossed the border into Brazil in the 1990s, quickly becoming an invasive species. Licensed private hunting of both feral boars and their hybrids with domestic pigs was authorized from August 2005 on in the southern Brazilian state of Rio Grande do Sul, although their presence as a pest had been already noticed by the press as early as 1994. Releases and escapes from unlicensed farms (established because of increased demand for boar meat as an alternative to pork) continued to bolster feral populations and, by mid-2008, licensed hunts had to be expanded to the states of Santa Catarina and São Paulo.

Recently established Brazilian boar populations are not to be confused with long-established populations of feral domestic pigs, which have existed mainly in the Pantanal for more than 100 years, along with native peccaries. The demographic dynamics of the interaction between feral pig populations and those of the two native species of peccaries (collared peccary and white-lipped peccary) is obscure and is still being studied. The existence of feral pigs could somewhat ease jaguar predation on peccary populations, as jaguars show a preference for hunting pigs when they are available.

== See also ==
- Boar hunting
- Boar–pig hybrid
- Hog-dog rodeo
- Pig wrestling
