= Hog-dog rodeo =

Blood sport

Hog-dog rodeo or hog-dogging, is a spectator event that simulates wild or feral boar hunting with dogs. It requires specially trained and bred "hog dogs" that are used to bay and sometimes catch a hog or boar. In most cases, bay dogs psychologically control the pig and no physical contact occurs. In some cases, however, such as Uncle Earl's Hog Dog Trials, along with bay dog events, catch dog events have been included in the past. In these, specially bred and equipped dogs caught and held the hog by the ears before the animals were quickly separated by a person who hog-tied the pig.

== Typical match ==
In a typical match, a hog is released into a pen followed by one or two bay dogs that attempt to control or subdue it by baying: barking and confronting the hog until it stops. The dogs most commonly used are Catahoula and Black Mouth Curs or specially bred mixes. Judges for these contests deduct points for improper behavior such as biting the hog or failing to bark, and award points for proper behaviors such as coming close to the front of the hog and maintaining steady eye contact with it.

== Catch dog events ==
These main bayings events have sometimes been augmented with catch competitions, where "catch dogs" bit and held the hogs' ears to maintain control, and then a human lifted the pig by rear legs and turned onto a side and hog-tied the pig. The event was timed, and the quickest time won. The dogs were outfitted with Kevlar chest and neck armor.

== Fees, wagering, and prizes ==
Spectators are generally charged an entrance fee. In some events, spectators bet on which dog will have the best time. Dog owners pay an entry fee, which may be divided among the owners of the winning dogs and the operator of the rodeo. In others, the winning dogs get a certificate and no cash prizes are involved.

== Piglet chase ==
Some hog-dog rodeos feature a piglet chase for kids. A muzzled feral piglet is released into an area filled with children, who try to catch the piglet. The child who manages to catch the piglet wins a prize.

== Background ==
Hog-dogging developed from the training and hunting of specialized boar-hunting dogs. The populations of wild hogs may be maintained and even supplemented to ensure that an adequate supply of animals to hunt (but only on small isolated hunting style ranches in parts of Texas, where for one reason or another, boars do not thrive in large numbers). Recreational hunting is predominantly orchestrated on an ad-hoc basis while effective pest control operations are well thought out and planned. The hunts are often expensive, labour intensive, and ineffective. The tools recreational hunters use: guns, bows and knives are inefficient as they are used as a test of skill and competence, not for eradication. For comparison, a study of recreational pig hunting activities from a six-year period (from 2006-2012) in Australia produced just over 11,000 pigs while a large-scale operation by authorities saw nearly 10,000 pigs killed in just 3 weeks. The control of the wild hog population is important because wild hogs are not an indigenous species and dominate and destroy the environment that all species depend upon.

Typically, a hunter with one or two dogs bays, or corners the hog and a catch dog catches (or catch dogs catch) the hog and the hunter comes in behind the dog(s), throws the hog down, and ties it. The development of this training into a competitive spectator event is often mistakenly believed to have first taken place in Winnfield, Louisiana at an event known as Uncle Earl's Hog Dog Trials. The trials were first organized in 1995 as part of the celebration of former governor and well-known hog hunter Earl K. Long's 100th birthday. In these trials, a group of five judges scores the dogs' skill at baying the hog (cornering it and causing it to stand still). Events are classed by the age of the dog and the number of dogs attempting the bay. This sport had been going on for decades before the Uncle Earl's annual meet legitimized and made the sport a state-recognized event. Injuries are rare in these trials as the dogs are restrained from seriously hurting the hundred pound boars and the dogs always wear protective Kevlar vests or collars if they will be coming into physical contact with any pig. Any bay dog that catches in a bay trial is disqualified.

== Legal status ==
In the United States, the states of Alabama, Florida, Louisiana, Mississippi, North Carolina, and South Carolina have laws against animal fighting and baiting that prohibit hog-dogging. The state of Louisiana outlawed hog-dog rodeos in 2004.

== See also ==
- Boar hunting
