= Working dog =

Dog trained to perform practical tasks

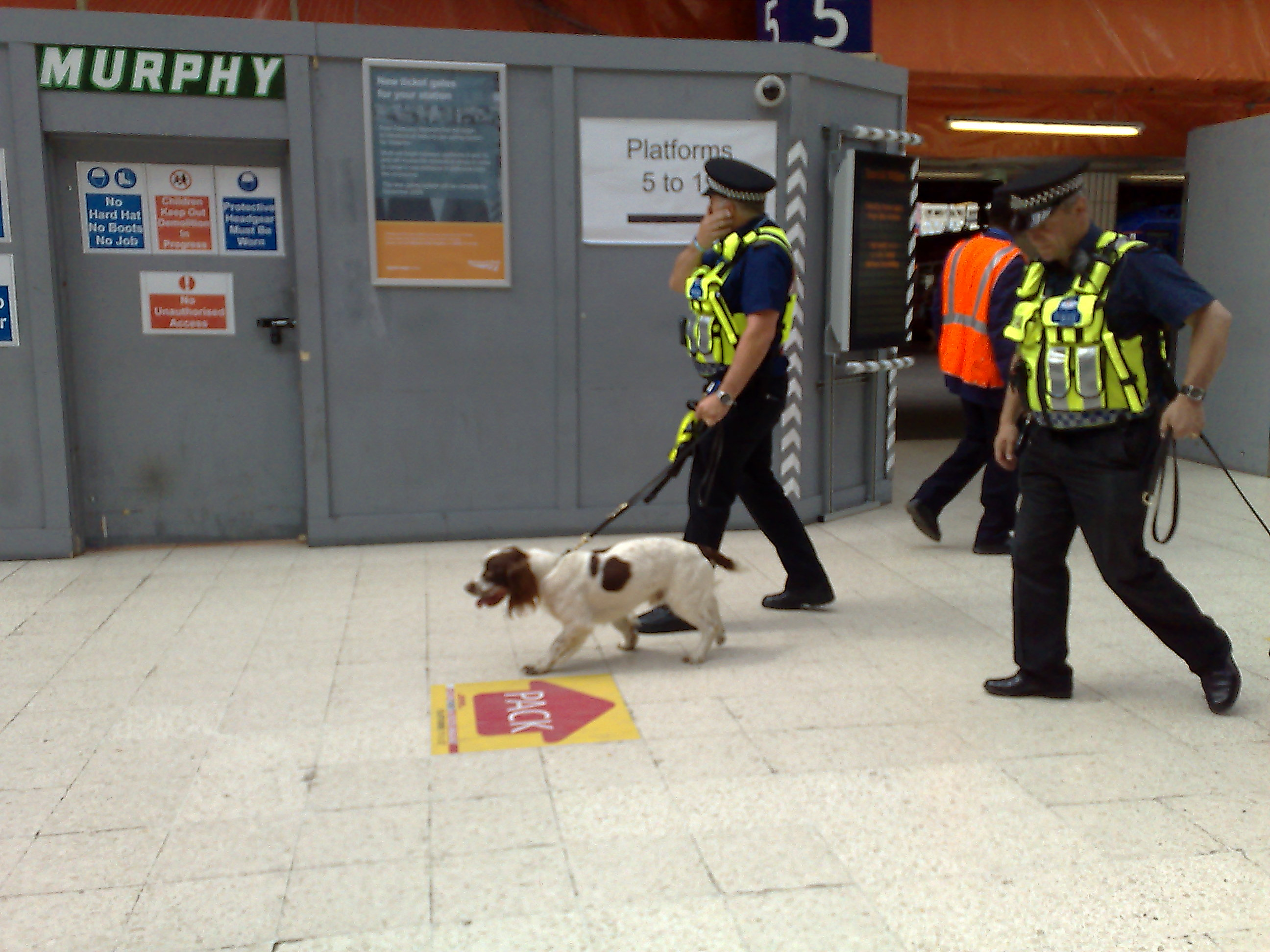
Detection dog of the Metropolitan Police patrolling in London

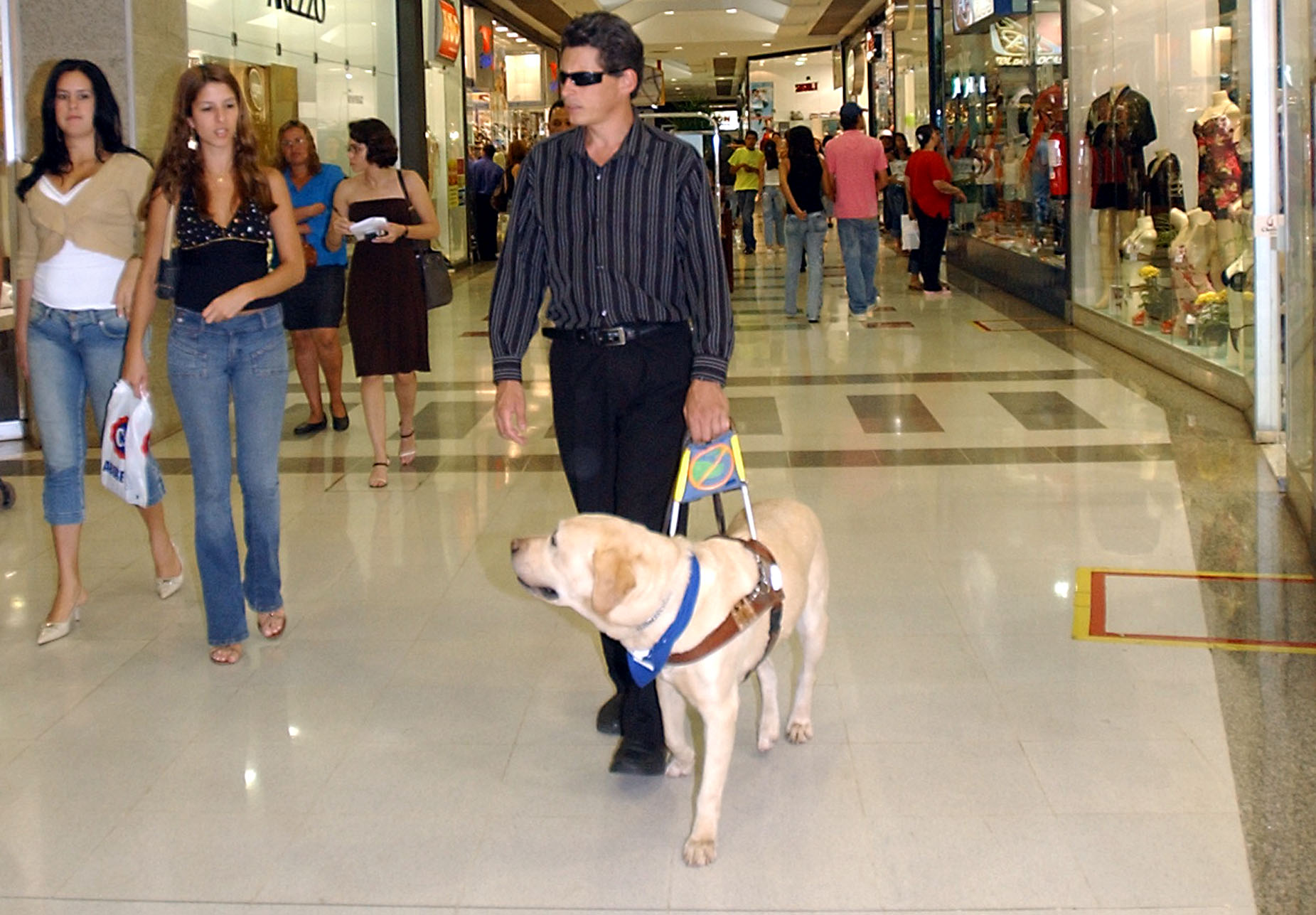
Guide dog in Brazil

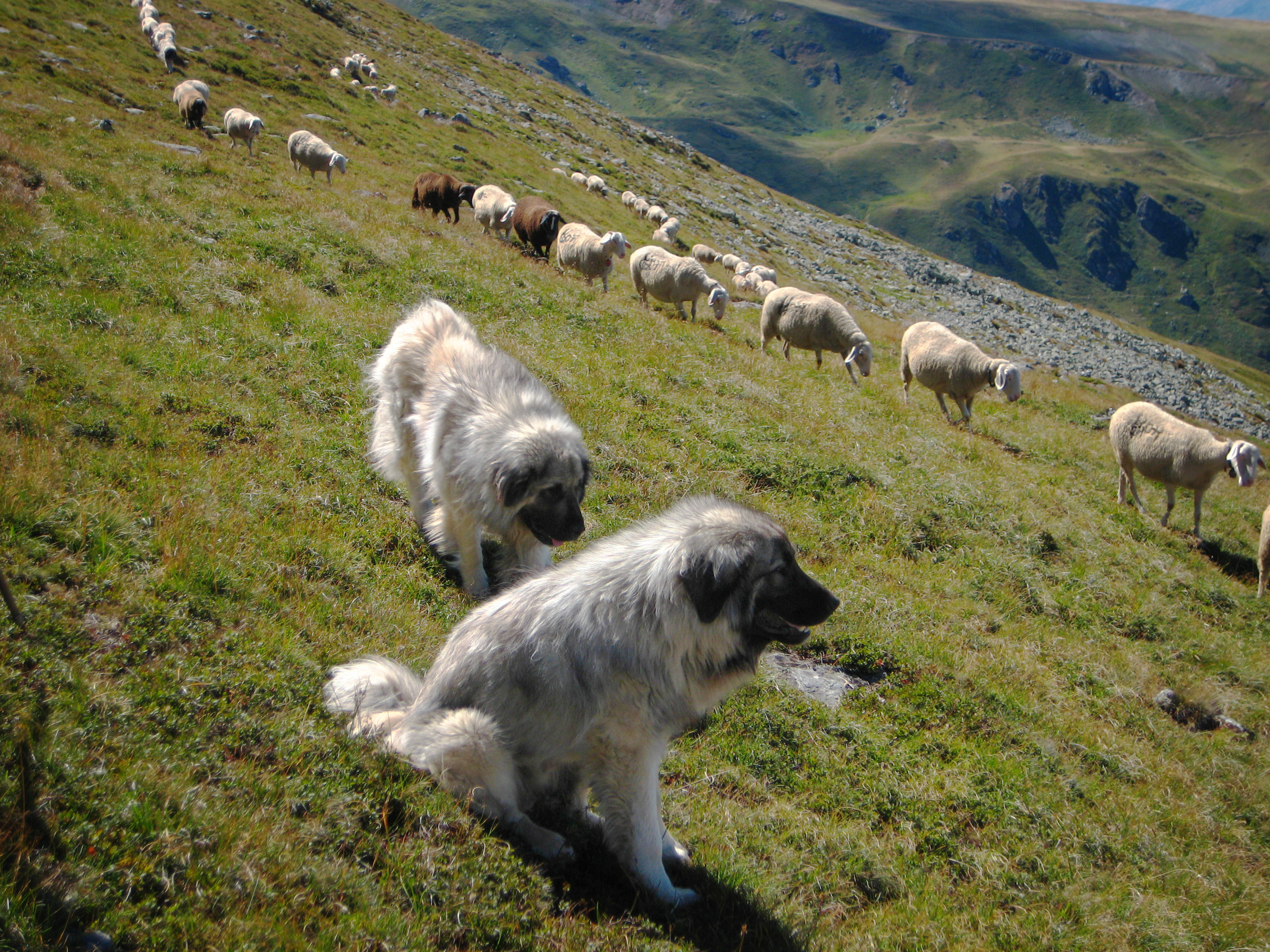
Šarplaninac livestock guarding dogs at work in the Šar Mountains

A working dog is a dog used to perform practical tasks, as opposed to pet or companion dogs.

Definitions vary on what a working dog is: they are sometimes described as any dog trained for and employed in meaningful work; other times as any dog whose breed heritage or physical characteristics lend itself to working irrespective of an individual animal's training or employment; and other times again it is used as a synonym for herding dog.

== Working dog types ==
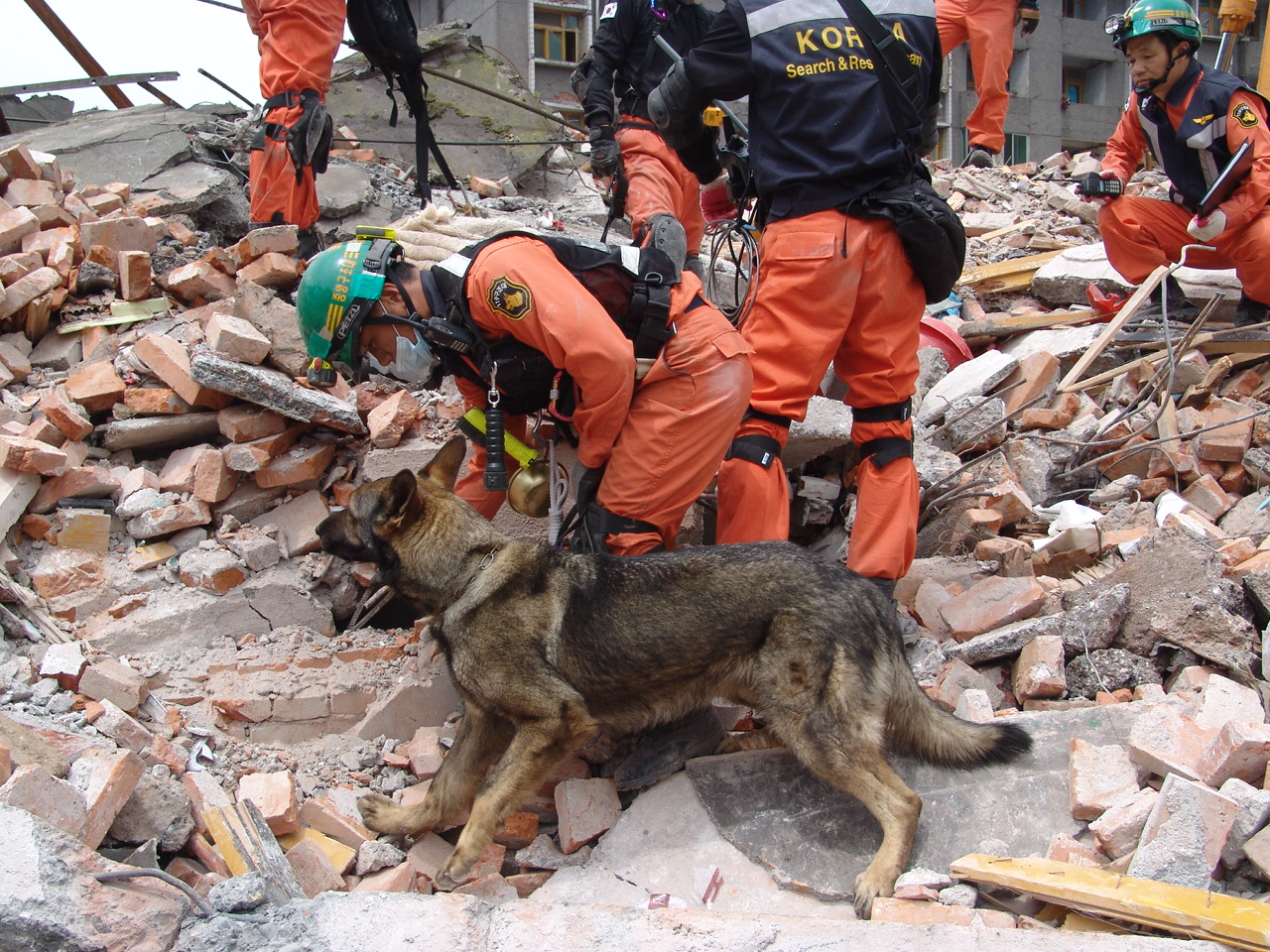
Search and rescue dog working in Seoul

Roles performed by dogs that sometimes sees them classified as working dogs include:

- Assistance or service dog, trained to help a disabled person in some way, such as guiding a visually impaired person, providing mobility assistance, and/or psychiatric service (often overlap with therapy dog used to provide companionship or to help people rehabilitate from injuries).
- Carriage dog, historically used to provide protection to carriage passengers or merchandise
- Detection dog or sniffer dog, trained in olfactory detection of specific substances, such as contraband and biological residue.
- Drafting dog, traditionally used to pull small carts. Now survive in modern age as a novelty or in carting sport.
- Guard dog, used to protect buildings or livestock
- Herding dog
- Hunting dog, used to hunt wildlife or assist hunters. Split into several varieties, including hounds, terriers, dachshunds, cur type dogs, catch dogs, bay dogs, or gun dogs.
- Military working dog, trained in combat, or used scouts, sentries, messengers, mercy dogs, and trackers
- Police dog
- School dog, different from assistance or service dogs and trained for animal-assisted education
- Search and rescue dogs are widely used to locate missing persons and assist in natural disaster response
- Sled dog
- Working terrier, a terrier bred to hunt small mammals, such as badgers, foxes, and rats

== Kennel club classification ==
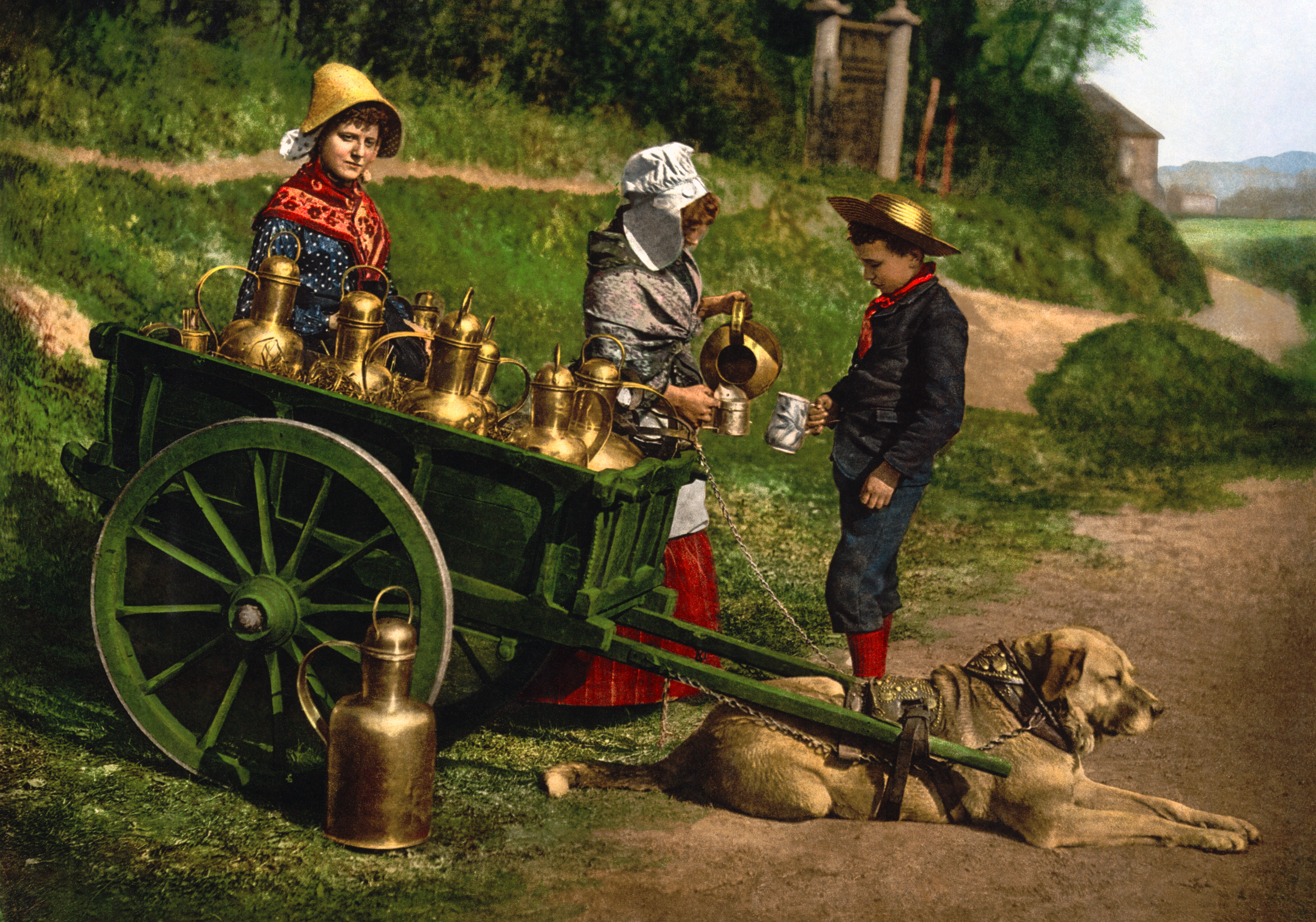
Historically, drafting dogs were common. A photochrom from the late 19th century showing two peddlers selling milk from a dogcart near Brussels, Belgium.

When competing in conformation shows, a number of kennel clubs classify various pedigree dog breeds into a "working group" or "working dogs group", although it varies between kennel club what breeds are so classified. The Kennel Club classifies mastiff, pinscher, sled dog, select livestock guardian dog and some other breeds in their working group. The American Kennel Club's working group and the Canadian Kennel Club's working dogs group are very similar to The Kennel Club's except they include all livestock guardian dog breeds and all full sized spitz breeds (not just sled dogs) recognised by the clubs. Both the Australian National Kennel Council's and New Zealand Kennel Club's working dogs groups comprise herding dog breeds and select livestock guardian dog breeds recognised by those clubs. The Fédération Cynologique Internationale has no working group.

== See also ==
- Seizure response dog – Assists person during or immediately before or after a seizure
- Working animal – Domesticated animals for assisting people
