= Boar hunting =

Hunting for wild boar or feral pigs

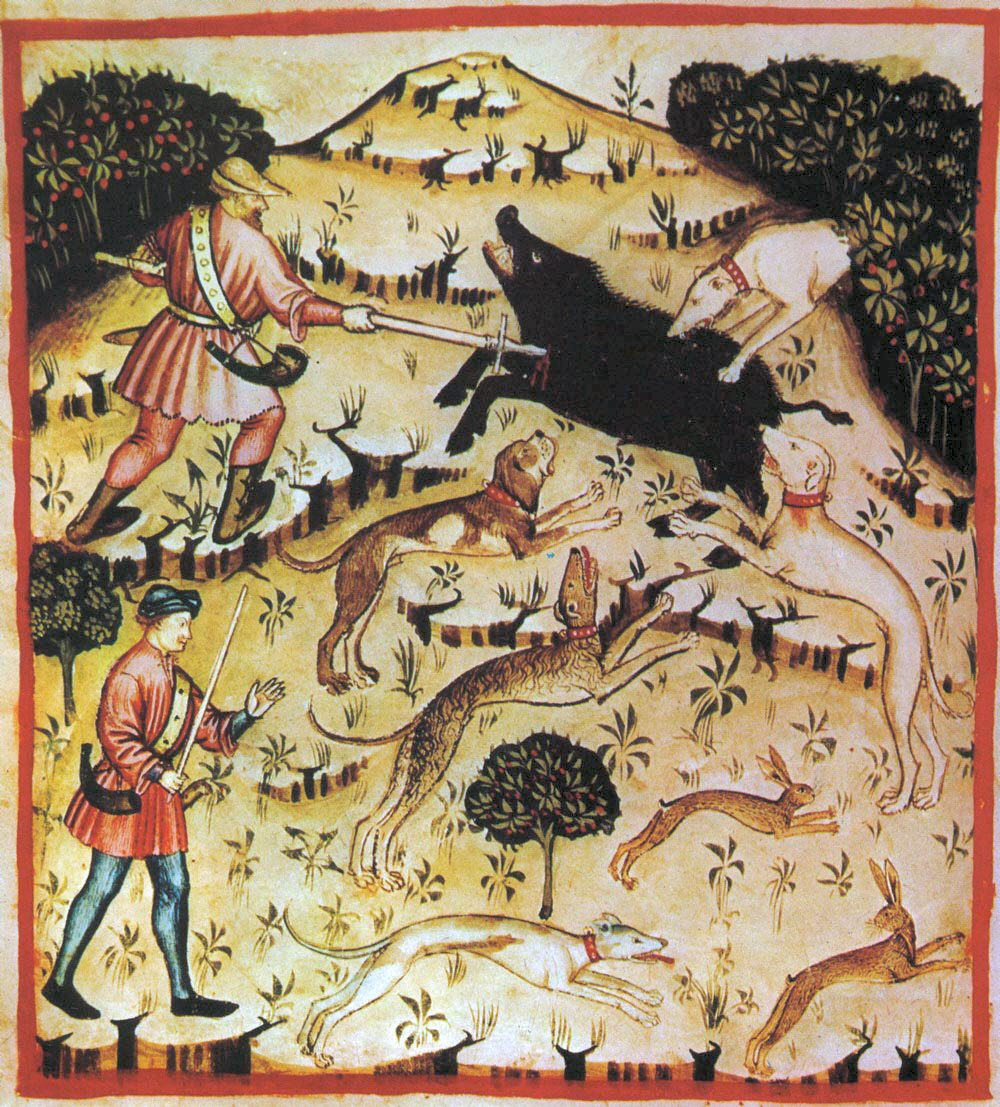
A 14th-century depiction of boar hunting with hounds

Boar hunting is the practice of hunting wild boar, feral pigs, warthogs, and peccaries. Boar hunting was historically a dangerous exercise due to the tusked animal's ambush tactics as well as its thick hide and dense bones rendering them difficult to kill with premodern weapons.

== Wild boar ==
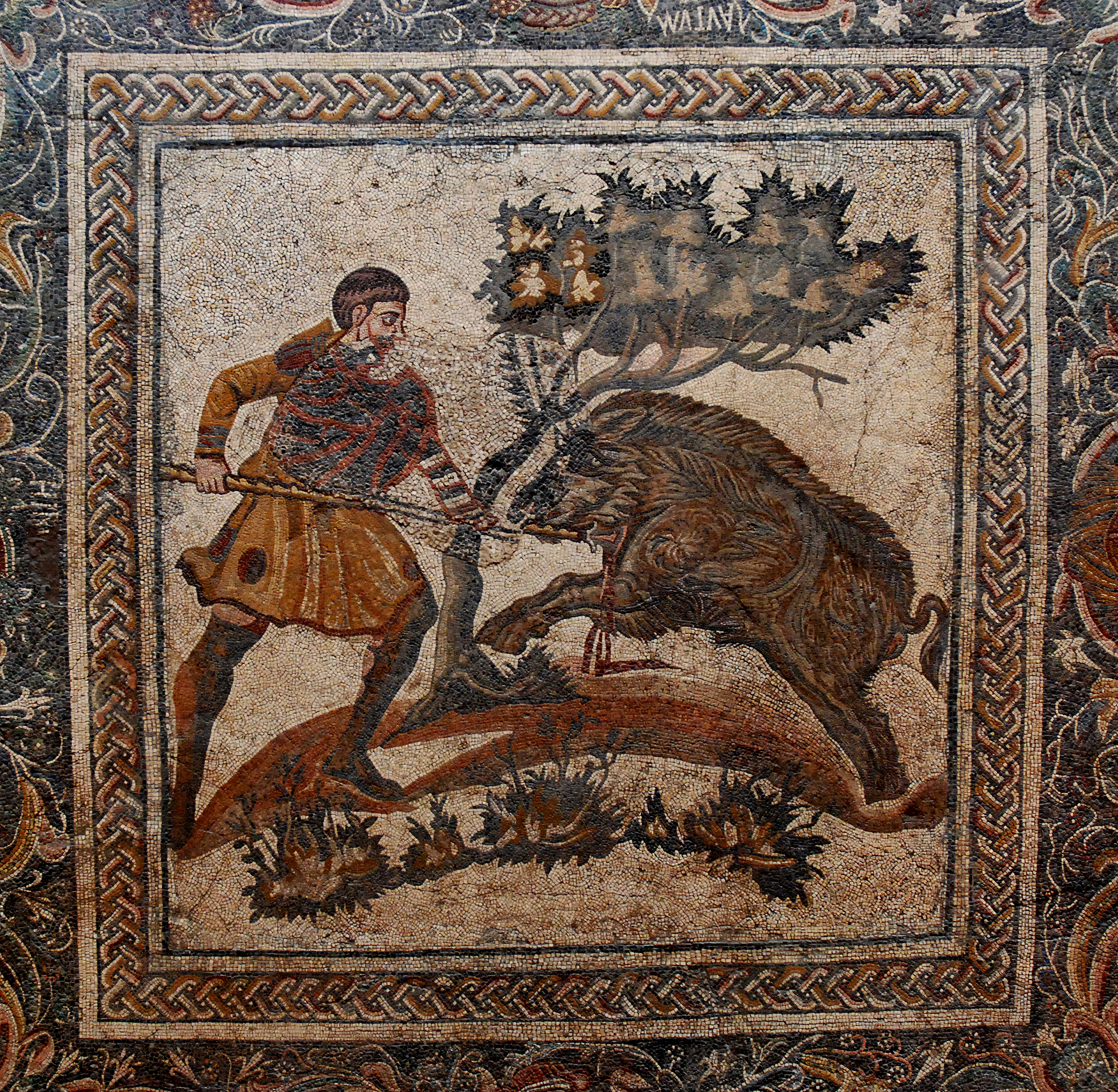
Floor mosaic, 4th century, from a Roman villa near Mérida, Spain

The wild boar (Sus scrofa) is the ancestral species of the domestic pig. It is native across much of Central Europe, the Mediterranean Region (including North Africa's Atlas Mountains) and much of Asia as far south as Indonesia, and has been widely introduced elsewhere.

Wild boar are hunted both for their meat, and to mitigate foraging damage to crops and forests.

== Methods ==
=== Pigsticking ===
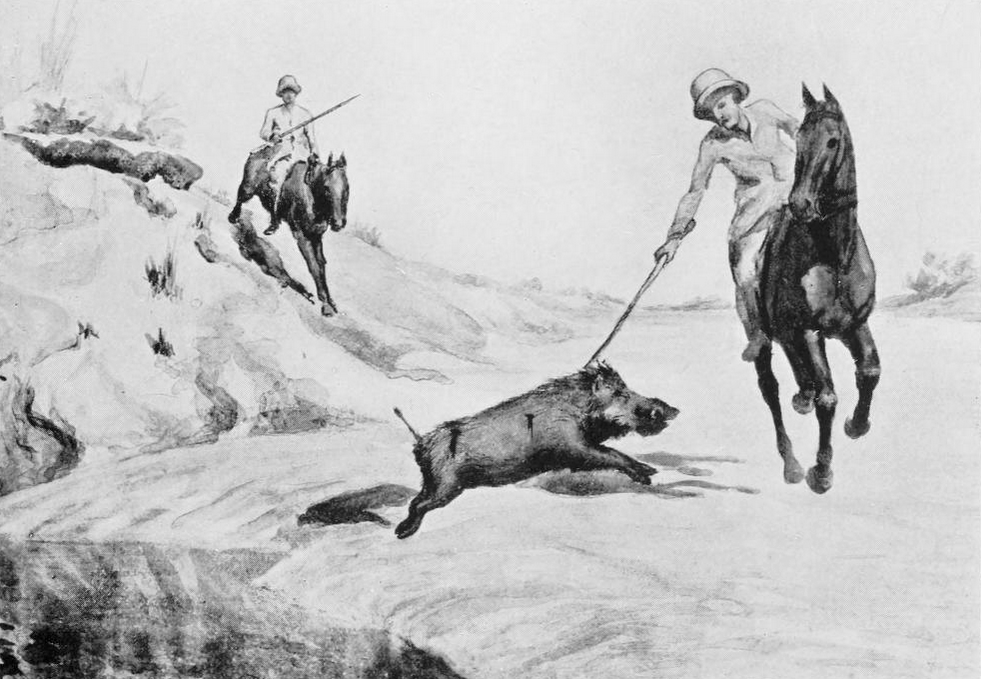
Pigsticking from horseback in India

Pigsticking is a form of boar hunting done by individuals, or groups of spearmen on foot or on horseback using a specialized boar spear. The boar spear was sometimes fitted with a cross guard to stop the enraged animal driving its pierced body further down the shaft in order to attack its killer before dying.

In India, pigsticking was popular among the Jatts, Gujjars, Rajputs, Sikhs, Maharajas, RajGond Rajas and with British officers during Victorian and Edwardian times. According to the Encyclopædia Britannica Eleventh Edition, it was encouraged by military authorities as good training because "a startled or angry wild boar is ... a desperate fighter [and therefore] the pig-sticker must possess a good eye, a steady hand, a firm seat, a cool head and a courageous heart."

Robert Baden-Powell, founder of the Scouting movement wrote a book on the subject. In Lessons from the Varsity of Life he says that, "I never took the usual leave to the hills in hot weather because I could not tear myself away from the sport." To those who condemned it, he said "Try it before you judge. See how the horse enjoys it, see how the boar himself, mad with rage, rushes wholeheartedly into the scrap, see how you, with your temper thoroughly roused, enjoy the opportunity of wreaking it to the full. Yes, hog-hunting is a brutal sport—and yet I loved it, as I loved also the fine old fellow I fought against." Michael Rosenthal quotes him as saying "Not only is pig-sticking the most exciting and enjoyable sport for both the man and horse as well, but I really believe that the boar enjoys it too."

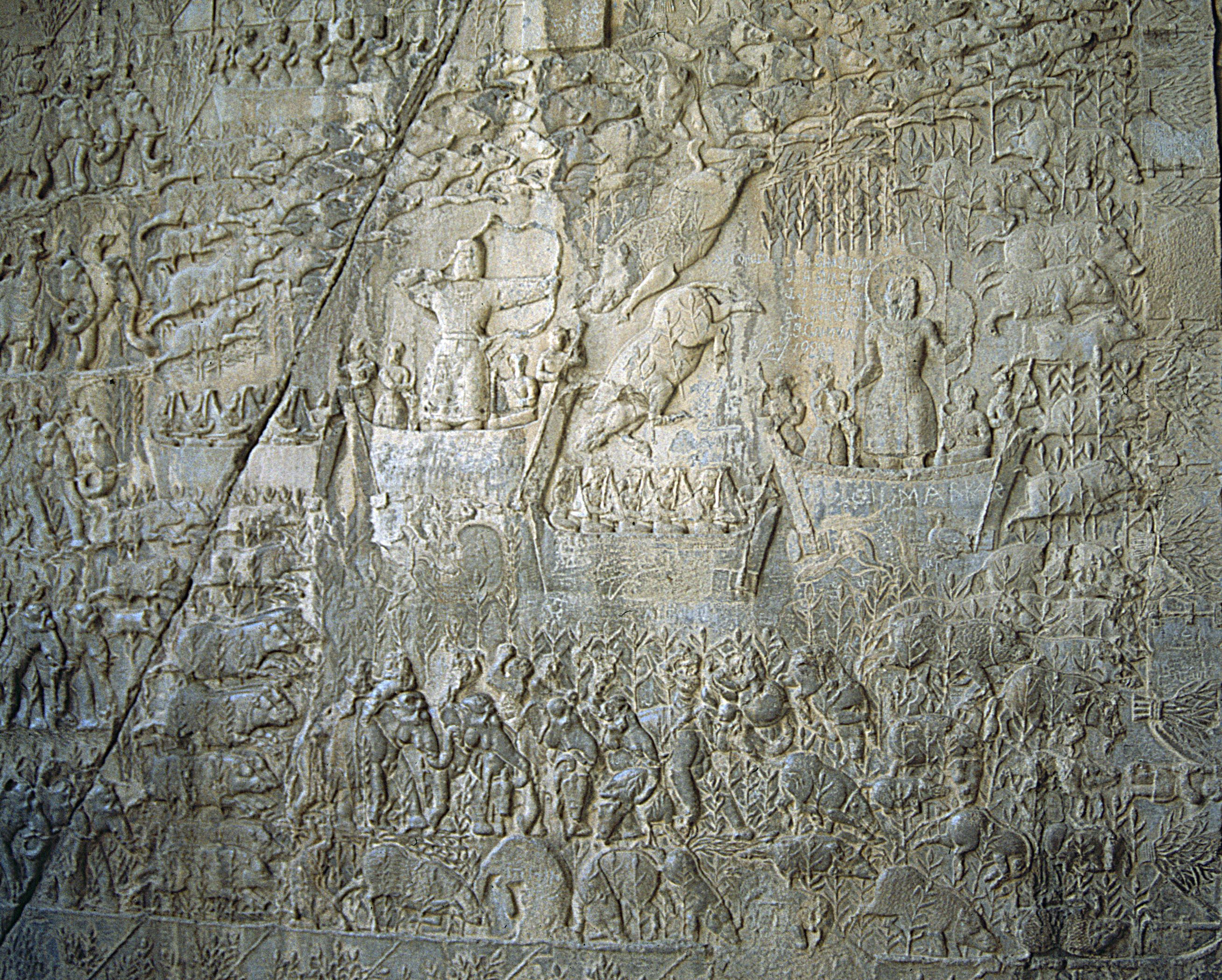
Royal hunt carving at Taq-e Bostan.

=== Elephants ===
In ancient Persia, aristocratic hunters used elephants to panic boar into marshland shallows, where they were then shot at from boats. Elephants ferried the carcasses to the hunting camp. Reliefs of these scenes have remained largely intact in Taq-e Bostan.

=== Hunting dogs ===
Sport with Dogs.–"How the Wild Boar is hunted by means of Dogs." Facsimile of a miniature in the manuscript of the Livre du Roy Modus (14th century). Depicts mounted hunters and catch dogs.

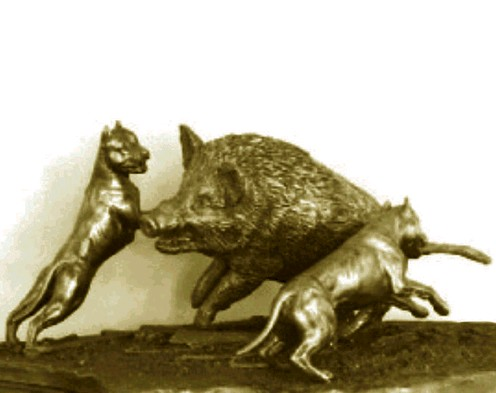
A bronze sculpture from the early 1900s, depicting two "catch dogs" working a wild boar.

Hunting dogs have been used to hunt boar since ancient times. Boar hunting dogs are loosely divided into two categories, bay dogs, and catch dogs.

- Bay dogs harass and harry the boar, keeping it cornered in one place and barking loudly. This behavior is known as "baying" or keeping the boar "at bay". The bay dogs' barking alerts the hunters to the bay, so that the hunter may catch up and kill the boar. Bay dogs are typically cur dogs, such as the American Leopard Hound, Rhodesian Ridgeback, Black Mouth Cur, Blue Lacy and Catahoula Leopard Dog, and trailing scent hounds, such as the Treeing Walker Coonhound, Foxhound, Plott Hound, and Berner Niederlaufhund.
- Catch dogs grip the boar with their jaws, typically seizing the base of the boar's ear. Once they have the boar, they will hold it down by the head until the hunter arrives. The hunter then comes in from behind and kills the boar with a knife or spear, unless the objective is live capture and relocation, in which case the hunter will "leg" (seize and elevate a rear leg), "flip" (force the now off-balance boar to lie on its side) and then "hog-tie" the boar's feet. Catch dogs are typically "bully" breeds, such as the American Bulldog and American Pit Bull Terrier, and mastiff breeds, such as the Bullmastiff, Cane Corso, Dogo Argentino, Dogue de Bordeaux, and smaller mastiff crosses.

It is not unusual for hunters to hunt with bay and catch dogs together. The bay dogs are used to find the boar and corner it. Once the boar is cornered or turns to fight, the catch dogs are released to seize the boar and hold it down.

Popular "hog dogs" in the U.S. include the Blackmouth Cur, Mountain Cur, Catahoula Leopard Dog, Blue Lacy, Plott Hound, Treeing Walker Coonhound, American Pit Bull Terrier and purposely-bred crosses. Popular "pig dogs" in Australia include Staghounds, the Bull Arab, Rhodesian Ridgebacks crossed with various mastiff breeds, Greyhound crosses, various terriers, and purposely-bred crosses.

=== Trapping ===
Trapping hogs is also a well-used technique for hunting and controlling feral hogs. Numerous types of traps exist and include designs such as the "Figure 6" or "heart" trap which are pen traps usually constructed with hog panels and T-Posts. Box traps, which are usually metal box frames with hog panel sides, top, and bottom along with a trap door that is activated once the pig is inside the box and feeding. Snares are also used successfully as a trap for feral hogs. Hogs are usually caught either by the foot or neck and held in place until the hunter arrives.

== History ==
Scholarship recognizes the boar hunting as an example of martial prowess in the Ancient World, but also involves the death of a male hero, sometimes connected to a goddess.

=== Ancient Greece and Rome ===
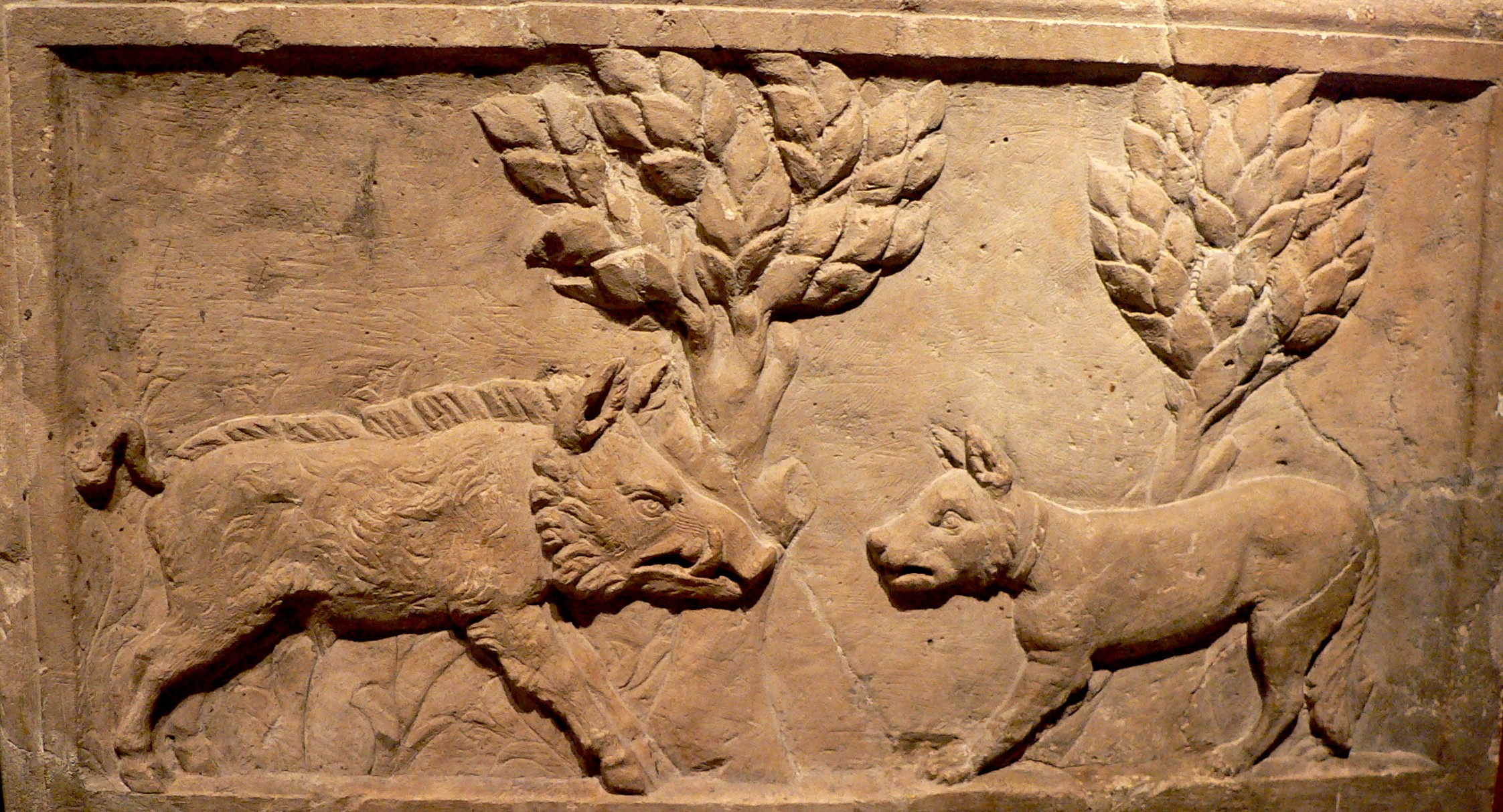
Roman relief, c. 3rd century of hunting wild boar with a bay dog.

In ancient Greek culture, the boar represented death, due to its hunting season beginning on 23 September, the near end of the year. The boar was also seen as a representation of darkness battling against light, due to its dark colouration and nocturnal habits. Boar hunts appear frequently in Ancient Greek mythology and literature. The first recorded mention of a boar hunt in Europe occurs in 700 BCE in Homer's rendition of the hunt for the Calydonian boar. In Homer's Odyssey, Odysseus was injured on the leg during a boar hunt as a boy. The scar on his leg is what leads Eurycleia to recognise him on his return to Ithaca. In the legend of Prince Adonis, the titular character goes on a boar hunt, only to be killed by his quarry. The third labour of Heracles involved the live capture of the Erymanthian Boar. According to the legend of the founding of Ephesus, the city was built upon the ground where a boar was killed by Prince Androclos.

The ancient Romans left behind many more representations of boar hunting than the Ancient Greeks in both literature and art. Hunting became popular among young Romans starting from the third century BCE. Hunting was seen as a way of fortifying character and exercising physical vigour. The boar was known as aper, feri sues or singularis on account of the animal's supposedly solitary habits. According to Pliny the Elder, Fulvius Lippinus was the first Roman to create a reserve for wild boar, where he would breed them for hunting in his land in Tarquinia. His methods would be imitated by Lucius Lucullus and Quintus Ortenzius.

=== Ancient Iberia ===
An archeological find from Mérida, Spain, dated to the fifth to third centuries BCE, depicts a male youth upon a horse, carrying a spear or javelin; he is accompanied by a hound and hunts a boar. This object, named Carro Votivo de Mérida ("The Votive Cart of Mérida"), seems to represent Greek prince Meleager in an episode of the myth of Calydonian Boar hunt, although there is no consensus on this matter.

=== Medieval Europe ===
The Germanic tribes responsible for the sack of Rome were avid hunters, though unlike the Greeks and Romans, they considered the deer and not the boar as the most noble quarry.

Unlike the Romans, for whom hunting boar was considered a simple pastime, the hunting of boars in medieval Europe was mostly done by nobles for the purpose of honing martial skill. It was traditional for the noble to dismount his horse once the boar was cornered and to finish it with a dagger. To increase the challenge, some hunters would commence their sport at the boars' mating season, when the animals were more aggressive. Records show that wild boar were abundant in medieval Europe. This is corroborated by documents from noble families and the clergy demanding tribute from commoners in the form of boar carcasses or body parts. In 1015, for example, the doge Ottone Orseolo demanded for himself and his successors the head and feet of every boar killed in his area of influence.

=== Renaissance period ===
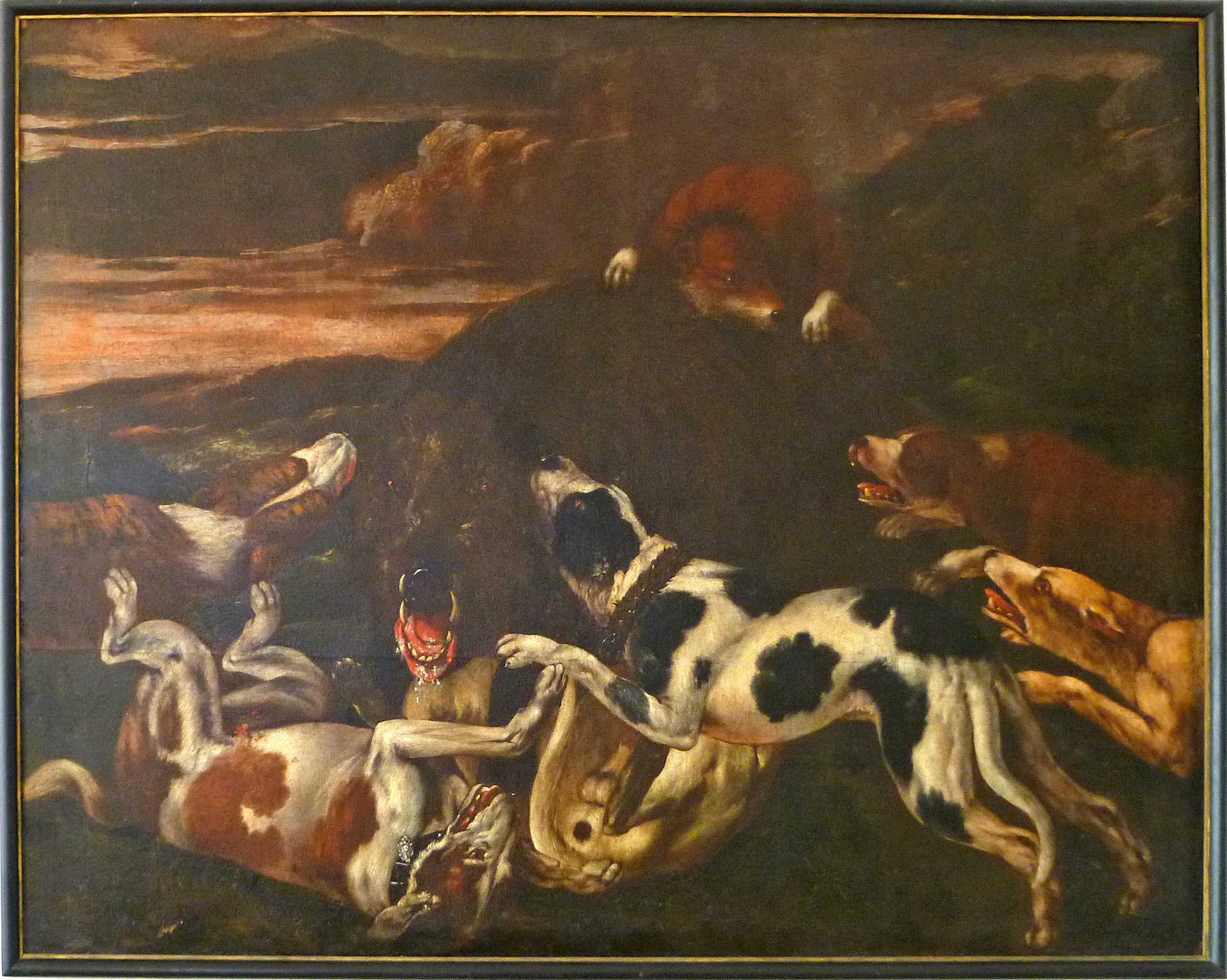
Boar Hunting in Germany (17th century)

The Renaissance period saw a dramatic reduction of forests for agriculture, thus diminishing some boar populations. Boars were increasingly hunted as crop predators by the rich, who rather than using spears, daggers and arrows, now had firearms allowing them to kill boars far more quickly and efficiently. The reduction in boar numbers resulted in the formation of hunting reserves.

The civil unrest following the end of the French Revolution put an end to feudal privileges, and hunting was liberalised, leading to a decrease in boar populations.

=== Modern era ===
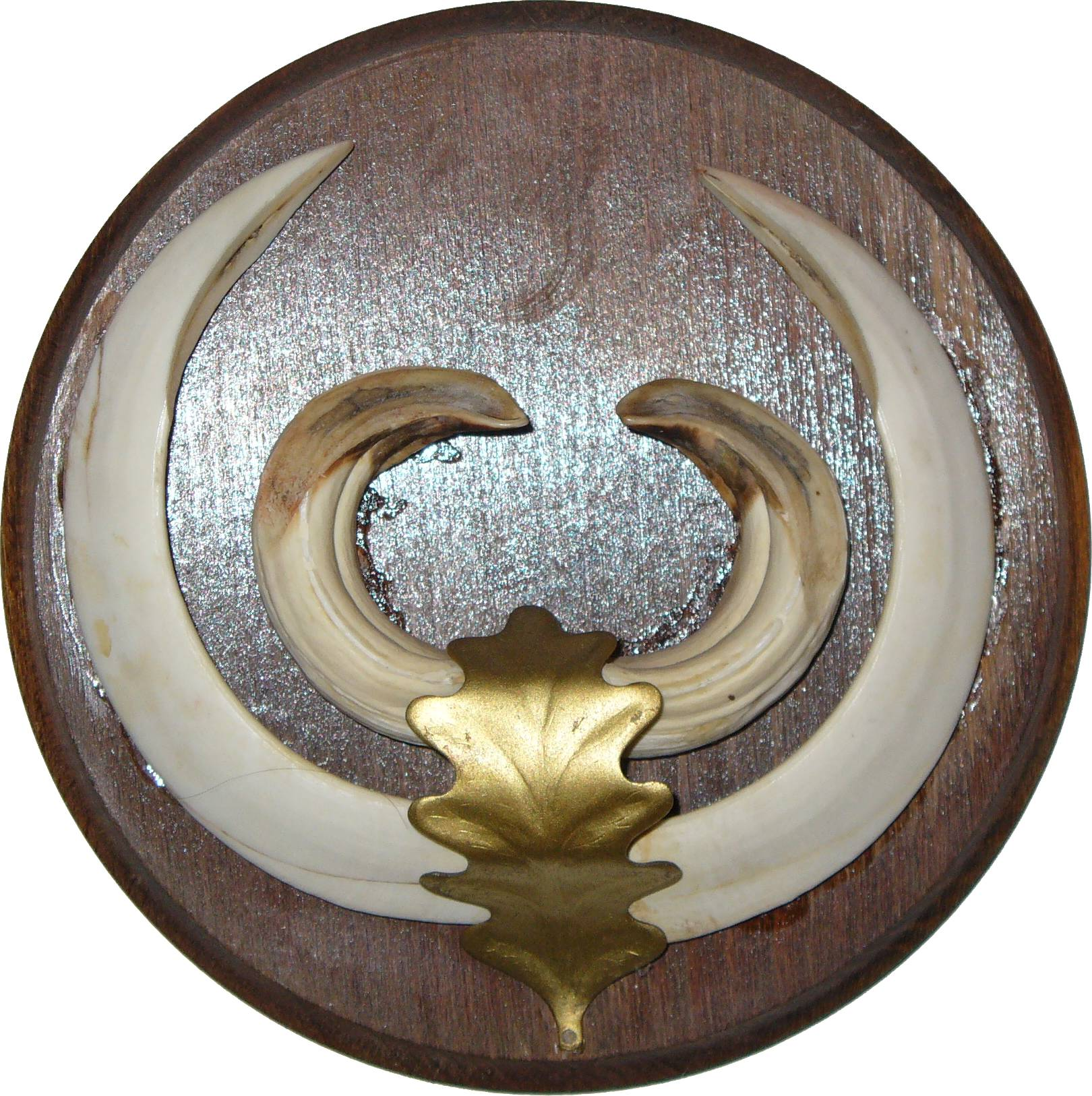
Tusks of a male wild boar, hunting trophy

In the modern era, boar hunting is also referred to as hog hunting or pig hunting. Adult hogs have very few predators and thrive once established in an area.

Wild boar hunts are still popular in countries such as India, Indonesia, Pakistan, Italy, Germany, Poland, Turkey, Argentina, Russia and Australia.

An annual boar hunting competition is held in the Australian town of Jambin, Queensland which is considered to be the country's largest such event. The three-day competition attracts hundreds of competitors who compete for prizes while attempting to cull the wild boar population in an effort to protect local farming land. The event is also a fundraiser for local schools.

In the United States, there are mobs of boar established across the country. Some states such as California, require hunters to purchase a hunting tag, but there is no limit on the numbers of animals that may be taken, unlike the limits on other game species such as deer and bear.

China banned the hunting of wild boars in 2000 as part of an effort to protect local biodiversity. As hog attacks have become a serious problem for communities across the country, the central government removed wild boars from its list of protected species in 2023, and authorities called in the hunters and offered bounties for wild boar killings.

== See also ==
- Bloodhound
- Hog-baiting
- List of notable pigs
- Medieval hunting
