= Winnfield, Louisiana =

- City
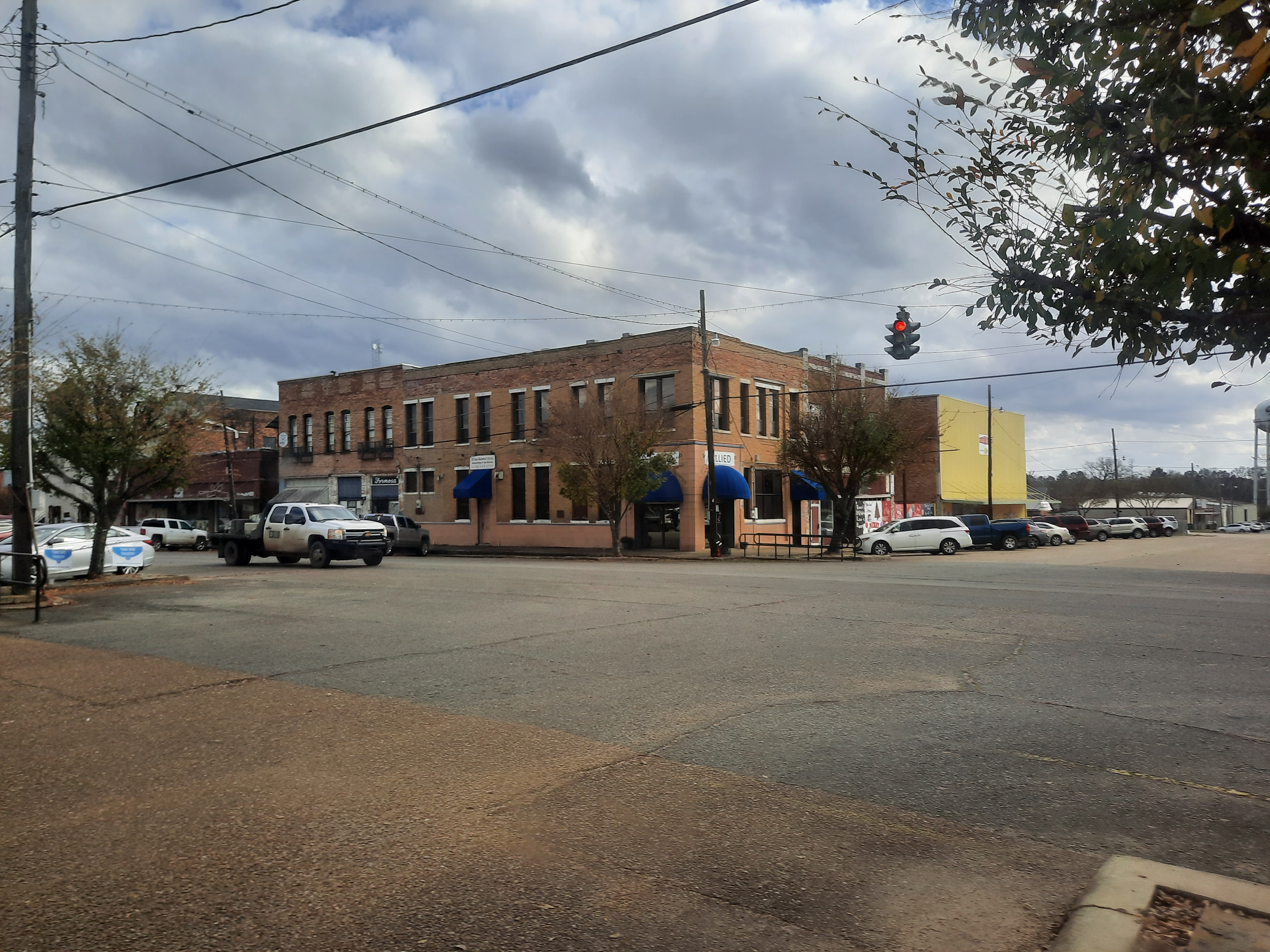
- Downtown Winnfield

- Location of Winnfield in Winn Parish, Louisiana

- Location of Louisiana in the United States
- Coordinates: 31°55′30″N 92°37′55″W
- Country: United States
- State: Louisiana
- Parish: Winn

Government
  - Type: City council/mayor

Area
  - Total: 3.64 sq mi (9.43 km^{2})
  - Land: 3.64 sq mi (9.43 km^{2})
  - Water: 0 sq mi (0.00 km^{2})
- Elevation: 144 ft (44 m)

Population (2020)
  - Total: 4,153
  - Density: 1,140.4/sq mi (440.32/km^{2})
- Time zone: UTC-6 (CST)
  - Summer (DST): UTC-5 (CDT)
- ZIP code: 71483
- Area code: 318
- FIPS code: 22-82460
- GNIS feature ID: 2405767
- Website: cityofwinnfield.com

Winnfield is a small city in, and the parish seat of, Winn Parish, Louisiana, United States. As of the 2020 census, Winnfield had a population of 4,153.

== History ==
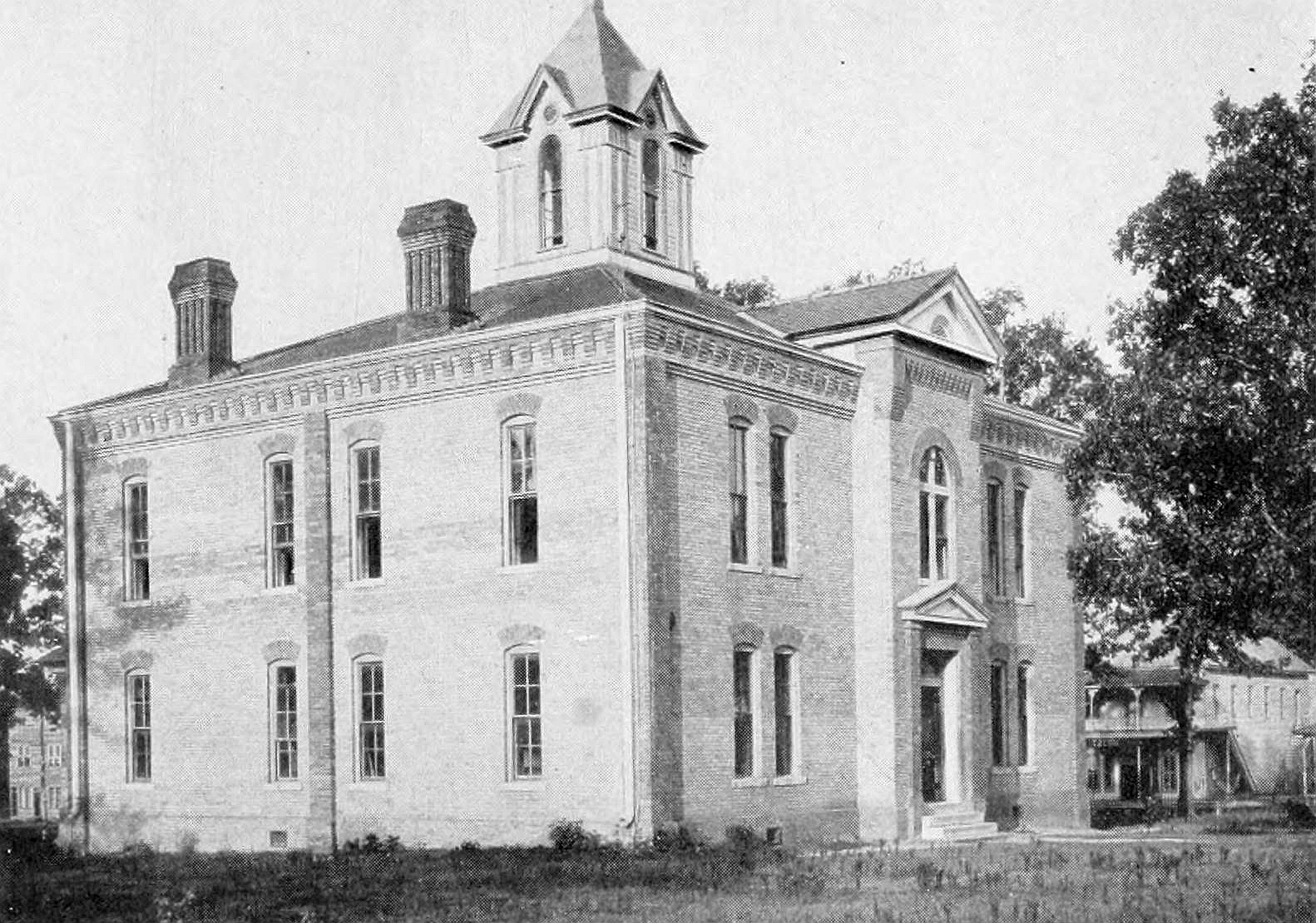
Winnfield Courthouse, 1904

When Winn Parish was officially formed by the state legislature in 1852, Winnfield was established as the parish seat.

Winnfield was a major producer of salt in the Civil War days; salt kettles used at Big Cedar and Drake's Salt Works furnished salt for the Confederate army. One still exists today in front of the Louisiana Political Museum and Hall of Fame, turned into a fountain. The salt works was located on Saline Bayou. Later the Cary Salt Works started an 840-foot deep mine west of Winnfield. The mine was used by the federal government in Project Coyboy Plowshare Program, Cowboy Event. Between December 1959 and March 1960 a series of high explosives were set off inside the Carry Salt Works in an unused portion of the mine.

== Geography ==
According to the United States Census Bureau, the city has a total area of 3.3 square miles (8.6 km^{2}), all land.

It is about a three hour traveling distance from Baton Rouge, Louisiana.

== Demographics ==
Historical population
Census	Pop.	Note	%±
1880	133		—
1910	2,925		—
1920	2,975		1.7%
1930	3,721		25.1%
1940	4,512		21.3%
1950	5,629		24.8%
1960	7,022		24.7%
1970	7,142		1.7%
1980	7,311		2.4%
1990	6,138		−16.0%
2000	5,749		−6.3%
2010	4,840		−15.8%
2020	4,153		−14.2%
2025 (est.)	4,480	▲	7.9%
U.S. Decennial Census

=== Racial and ethnic composition ===
Winnfield city, Louisiana – Racial and ethnic composition Note: the US Census treats Hispanic/Latino as an ethnic category. This table excludes Latinos from the racial categories and assigns them to a separate category. Hispanics/Latinos may be of any race.
Race / Ethnicity (NH = Non-Hispanic)	Pop 2000	Pop 2010	Pop 2020	% 2000	% 2010	% 2020
White alone (NH)	2,732	2,165	1,636	47.52%	44.73%	39.39%
Black or African American alone (NH)	2,857	2,432	2,210	49.70%	50.25%	53.21%
Native American or Alaska Native alone (NH)	21	27	18	0.37%	0.56%	0.43%
Asian alone (NH)	9	17	4	0.16%	0.35%	0.10%
Native Hawaiian or Pacific Islander alone (NH)	0	2	0	0.00%	0.04%	0.00%
Other race alone (NH)	0	6	14	0.00%	0.12%	0.34%
Mixed race or Multiracial (NH)	64	66	143	1.11%	1.36%	3.44%
Hispanic or Latino (any race)	66	125	128	1.15%	2.58%	3.08%
Total	5,749	4,840	4,153	100.00%	100.00%	100.00%

=== 2020 census ===
As of the 2020 census, Winnfield had a population of 4,153. The median age was 37.8 years. 26.3% of residents were under the age of 18 and 17.8% were 65 years of age or older. For every 100 females there were 85.0 males, and for every 100 females age 18 and over there were 78.9 males age 18 and over.

There were 1,693 households, including 1,173 families, in the city. Of all households, 33.7% had children under the age of 18 living in them. Married-couple households made up 24.7% of households, while 22.9% had a male householder with no spouse or partner present and 46.3% had a female householder with no spouse or partner present. About 36.0% of all households were made up of individuals, and 16.0% had someone living alone who was 65 years of age or older.

There were 2,085 housing units, of which 18.8% were vacant. The homeowner vacancy rate was 2.0% and the rental vacancy rate was 8.5%.

99.6% of residents lived in urban areas, while 0.4% lived in rural areas.

== Economy ==
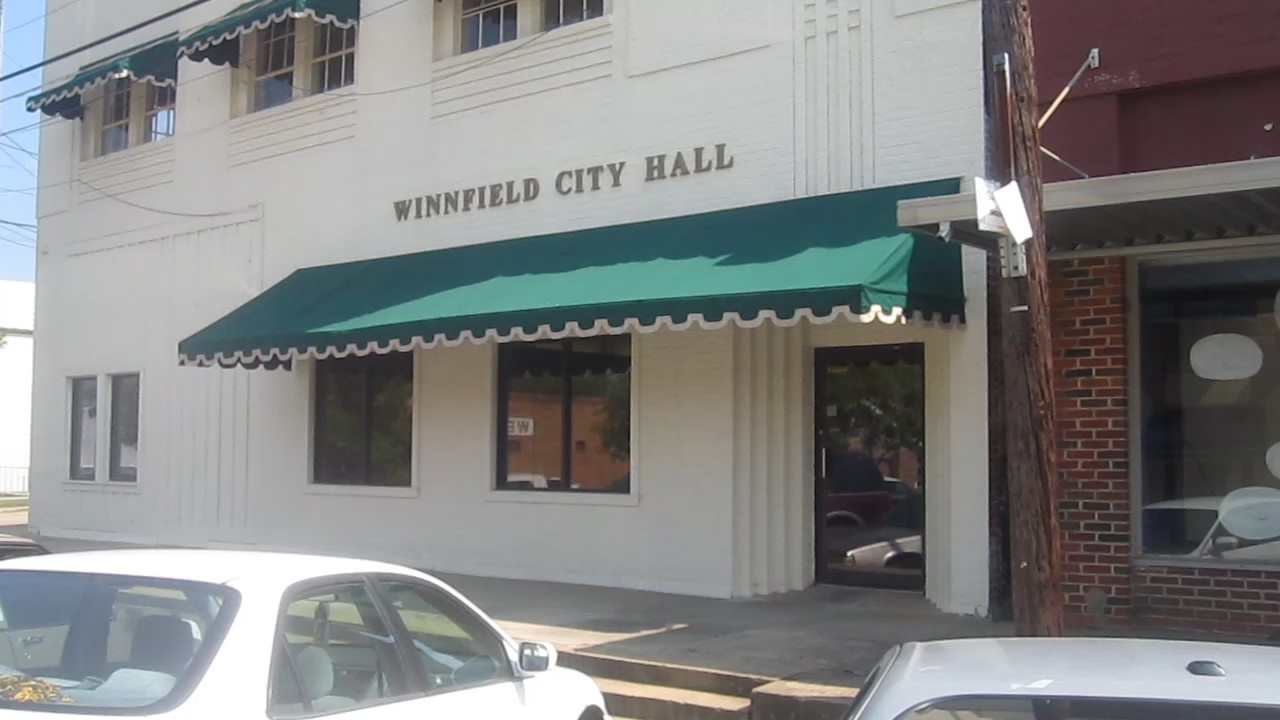
Winnfield City Hall

As of 2014, according to Bauer, Walmart, Winn Correctional Center, and the area lumber mill offer the majority of the jobs in the Winnfield area; because of the poverty in the area, residents are willing to take low-paying jobs at Winn Correctional Center despite the danger present there.

== Arts and culture ==
=== Museums ===
- Louisiana Political Museum and Hall of Fame

=== Annual events ===
- Uncle Earl's Hog Dog Trials – a yearly bay dog event
- Louisiana Forest Festival

== Education ==
=== Public schools ===
Winn Parish School Board operates local public schools, which include:

- Winnfield Senior High School (9–12)
- Winnfield Middle School (5–8)
- Winnfield Primary School (K–4)

=== Higher education ===
- Central Louisiana Technical Community College — Huey P. Long campus

== Media ==
=== Newspapers ===
- The Piney Woods Journal
- Winn Parish Enterprise
- Winn Parish Journal

=== TV ===
- KCDH-LP, cable only

=== Radio ===
- KVCL-FM - country music

== Infrastructure ==
=== Health Care ===
Winn Parish Medical Center is a 30-bed facility. it was founded in 1948.

== Notable people ==
- A. Leonard Allen (1891–1969), politician
- Oscar K. Allen (1882–1936), politician
- George Washington Bolton (1841–1931), businessman and politician
- Harley Bozeman (1891–1971), author, politician, and farmer
- P. J. Brown (born 1969), basketball player
- John Burrows (1913–1987), baseball player
- Randy Fenoli, fashion designer
- Earl Long (1895–1960), politician
- Gillis William Long (1923–1985), politician
- Huey Long (1895–1935), politician
- Speedy Long (1928–2006), politician
- Dick Merrill (1894–1982), aviator and actor
- Thomas D. Milling (1887–1960), military officer
- Preston Powell (1936–2020), football player
- William Jay Smith (1918–2015), poet
- Anthony Thomas (born 1977), football player
- Jack Wallace (1890–1960), baseball player
