= Catch dog =

Specially trained dog that is used to catch large animals

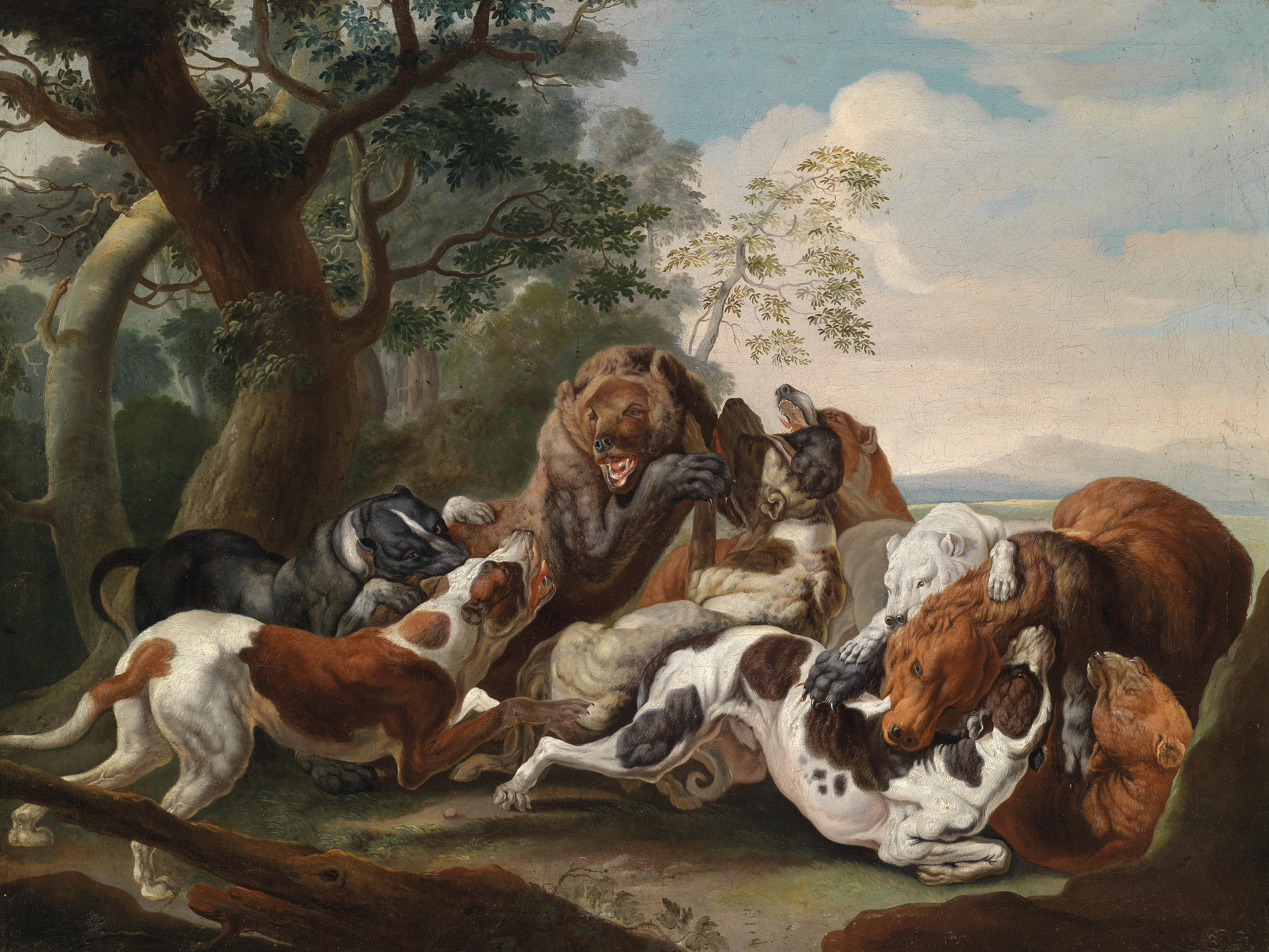
Catch dogs hunting bears, 17th century

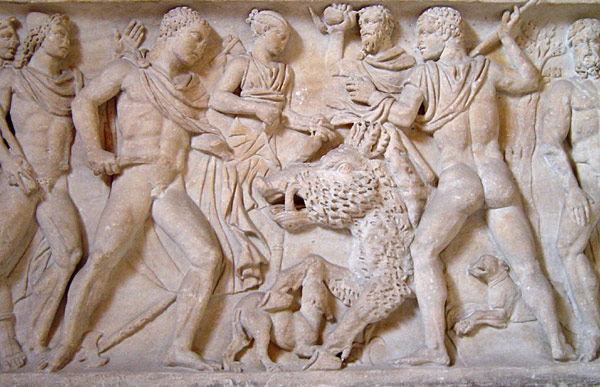
Romans used "catch dogs" to hunt wild boar

A catch dog is a specially trained dog that is used to catch large animals in hunting, working livestock, and baiting.

In hunting, catch dogs work alongside bay dogs to corner prey and alert their handler by howling or baying. Catch dogs are typically equipped with chest armor to protect against the boar's tusk and neck armor to prevent neck injuries.

As livestock dogs, catch dogs use their weight and teeth to immobilize live animals so that they can be captured, or literally hogtied, by the dog's handlers, who may be stockmen, hunters, butchers, or farmers.

== Terminology ==
According to the 2009 edition of Webster's Dictionary of American English, the term "catch dog" is a noun phrase referring to a dog used or bred for working livestock. The entry identifies the term as being American, and dating to circa 1857, although the practice is known to date at least back to the ancient Romans.

== Boar hunting dogs ==
Catch dogs physically take hold of the boar, typically seizing the base of the boar's ear. Once the catch dogs have physical control of the boar, they will hold it down by the head indefinitely until the hunter arrives. The hunter then comes in from behind the boar, and dispatches the boar with a knife or spear.

It is not unusual for hunters to utilize both bay and catch dogs in the same hunt. Bay dogs are used to find the boar, initiate the chase, and pursue the quarry. Sometimes the boar will run from the bay dogs at first, but at some point during the chase either stop to fight or become cornered. At this point catch dogs are released to keep the boar stationary for the hunter.

== See also ==
- Boar hunting
- Medieval hunting
- Hog-baiting
- Uncle Earl's Hog Dog Trials
