= Jack Wallace (catcher) =

American baseball player (1890–1960)

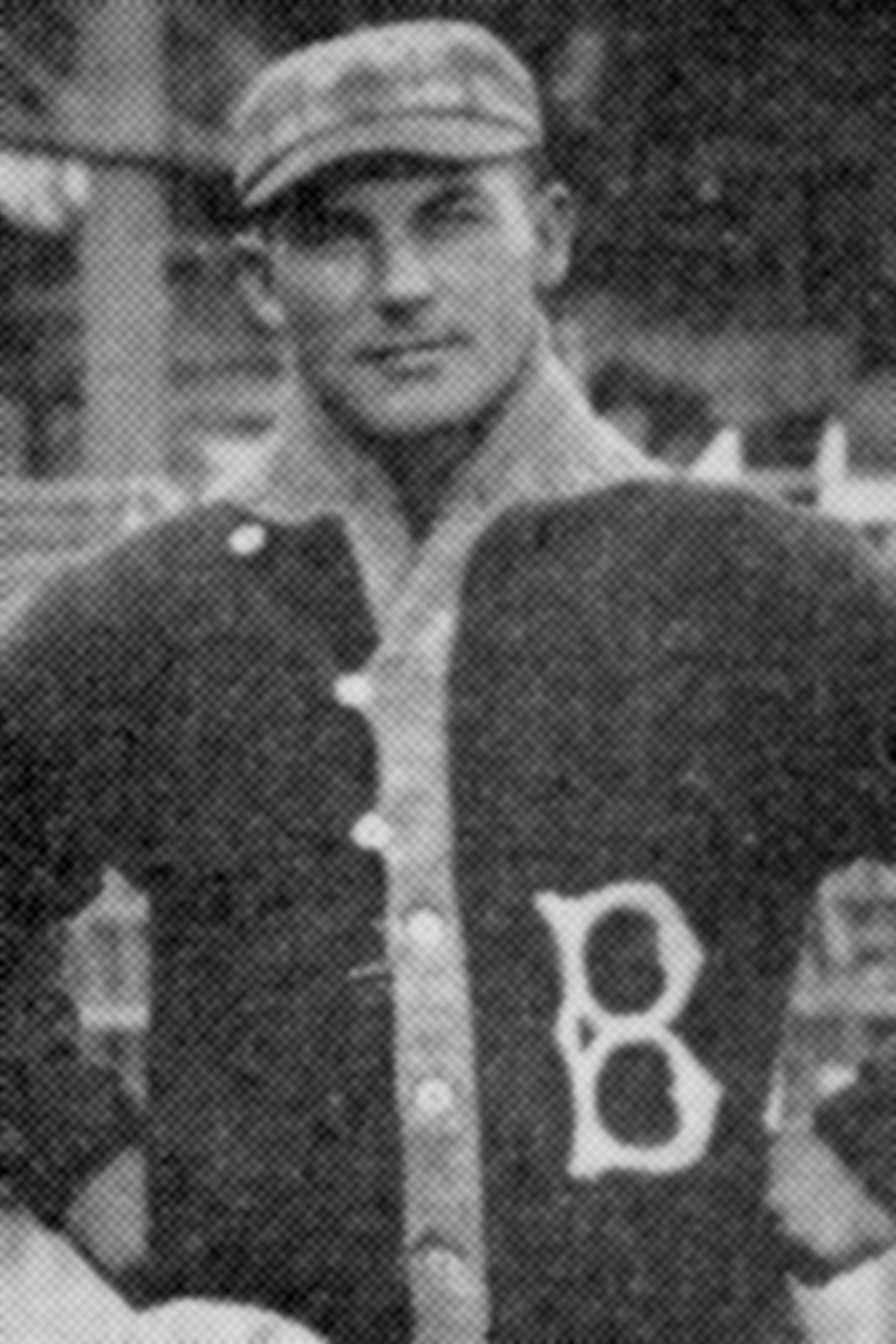
- Catcher
- Born: August 6, 1890; Winnfield, Louisiana
- Died: October 15, 1960 (aged 70); Winnfield, Louisiana
- Batted: Right Threw: Right

MLB debut
- September 27, 1915, for the Chicago Cubs

Last MLB appearance
- September 30, 1915, for the Chicago Cubs

MLB statistics
- Batting average: .286
- Home runs: 0
- Runs batted in: 1
- Stats at Baseball Reference

Teams
- Chicago Cubs (1915)

Clarence Eugene "Jack" Wallace (August 6, 1890 – October 15, 1960) was a Major League Baseball catcher. Wallace played for the Chicago Cubs in the 1915 season. He played just two games in his career, having two hits in seven at-bats. Wallace was born and died in Winnfield, Louisiana.
