= Hogtie =

Physical restraint by tying the limbs together

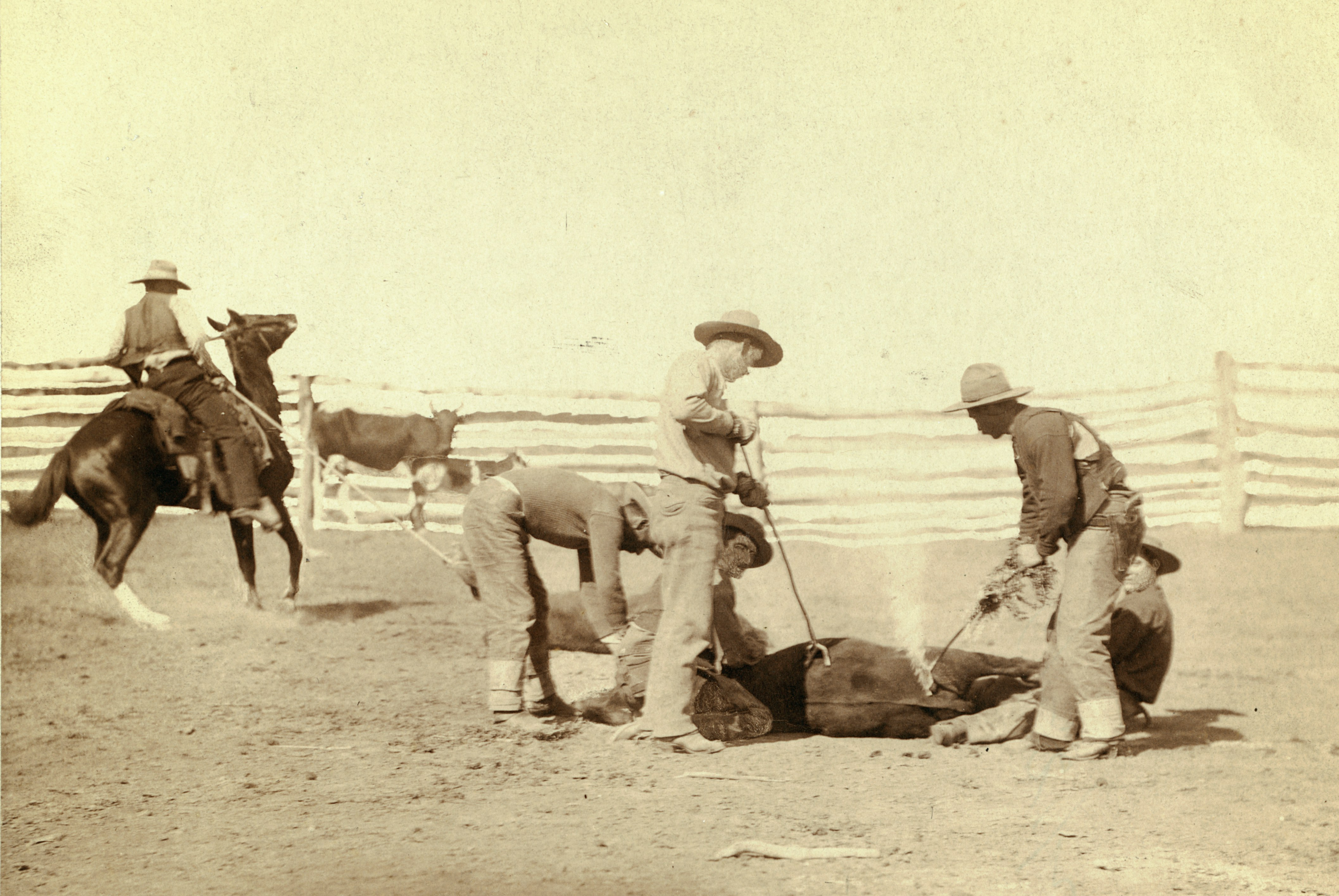
A calf hogtied while being branded on a ranch.

The hogtie is a method of tying the limbs together, rendering the subject immobile and helpless. Originally, it was applied to pigs (hence the name) and other young four-legged animals.

== Agriculture uses ==
The hogtie when used on pigs and cattle has it where three of the four limbs are tied together, as tying all four together is difficult and can result in harm to the animal.

== Human uses ==
When performed on a human, a hogtie is any position that results in the arms and legs being bound, both tied behind the person and then connecting the hands and feet. Psychologist Kenneth Faiver claims the practice is inhumane.

Typically, the person's feet are restrained with legcuffs or similar devices, and handcuffed with the hands behind the back. The feet are pulled behind the person, until the hands and feet can be connected. (The head and neck are left free.) The restrained person is then placed on the stomach, in a face-down prone position, which decreases the risk of the restrained person kicking nearby people or objects, or hurting themselves by pounding their heads against nearby objects, but which also increases the risk of positional restraint asphyxia (a restraint-specific form of positional asphyxia).

Hogtying, also called the prone maximal restraint position or the hobble position, may make it somewhat more difficult for some people to breathe, especially after physical activity. Frequently, hog-tying has been performed on a person who has been violently resisting. Various mechanisms for sudden death while hogtied have been proposed, ranging from changes in chest movement from being handcuffed, to drug use, to pre-existing medical conditions such as obesity or chronic obstructive pulmonary disease, to police and medical personnel using their body weight to compress both the chest and abdomen in the process of applying the restraint devices. Concerns about the restrained person dying have led to many US police departments discontinuing the practice of hogtying people.

== See also ==
- Hogtie bondage, a BDSM practice
- Calf roping
