= Uncle Earl's Hog Dog Trials =

Uncle Earl's Hog Dog Trials is an annual Hog Dog Baying Event held in the third weekend of March in Winnfield, Winn Parish, Louisiana at the Winn Parish Fair Grounds involving boars and various breeds of bay dogs, including Catahoula Leopard Dogs, Blackmouth Cur, Blue Lacy, and others.

== History ==
Begun in 1994, the event was named for three-time Louisiana governor "Uncle" Earl Long, an avid stockman and boar hunter who was born in Winnfield in 1895.

In 2010 a lawsuit over the show ownership resulted in the cancellation of the show for a year.

In 2011 a new Corporation was formed and the Board of Directors, Uncle Earl's Hog Dog Trials, Inc. was selected among City of Winnfield Merchants and Citizens. The Board is responsible for overseeing the production contracts and the Youth Scholarship Fund for the Annual Baying Event. Full Boar Productions was awarded the Production and Promotion Contracts until the year 2018. The 2018–2027 contractor for this event is Jake Loiacano.

== About ==
In this particular event, bay dogs are judged on their containment and control of the boar and their style of baying (howling). The better bay dogs will bay in a pattern that alerts the hunter and retains control of the boar with his demeanor and herding ability. If a boar runs from the dogs, they may nip the boar to make him stop; however, "catching" the stock is prohibited.

Louisiana bans hog-catching but permits bay dog or herding events after the Louisiana Society for the Prevention of Cruelty to Animals worked on the law that exempted Uncle Earl's, and other baying and herding events.

People attend Uncle Earl's from as far away as Canada, England, and California.

In 2012, a Campfire Cookoff was added with celebrity judges including the Mayor of Winnfield, David Peavey and Kelly Lee from Camo Life TV (a television hunting show), and Brandy Watts of Hogs Gone Wild.

== Safety ==
Dogs are outfitted with Kevlar vests, chest armor, and extra-wide collars to protect them from any major injuries. The Stock is kept in excellent condition by licensed contractors and facilities.
