= Bay dog =

Dog trained to alert hunters to the location of a large animal

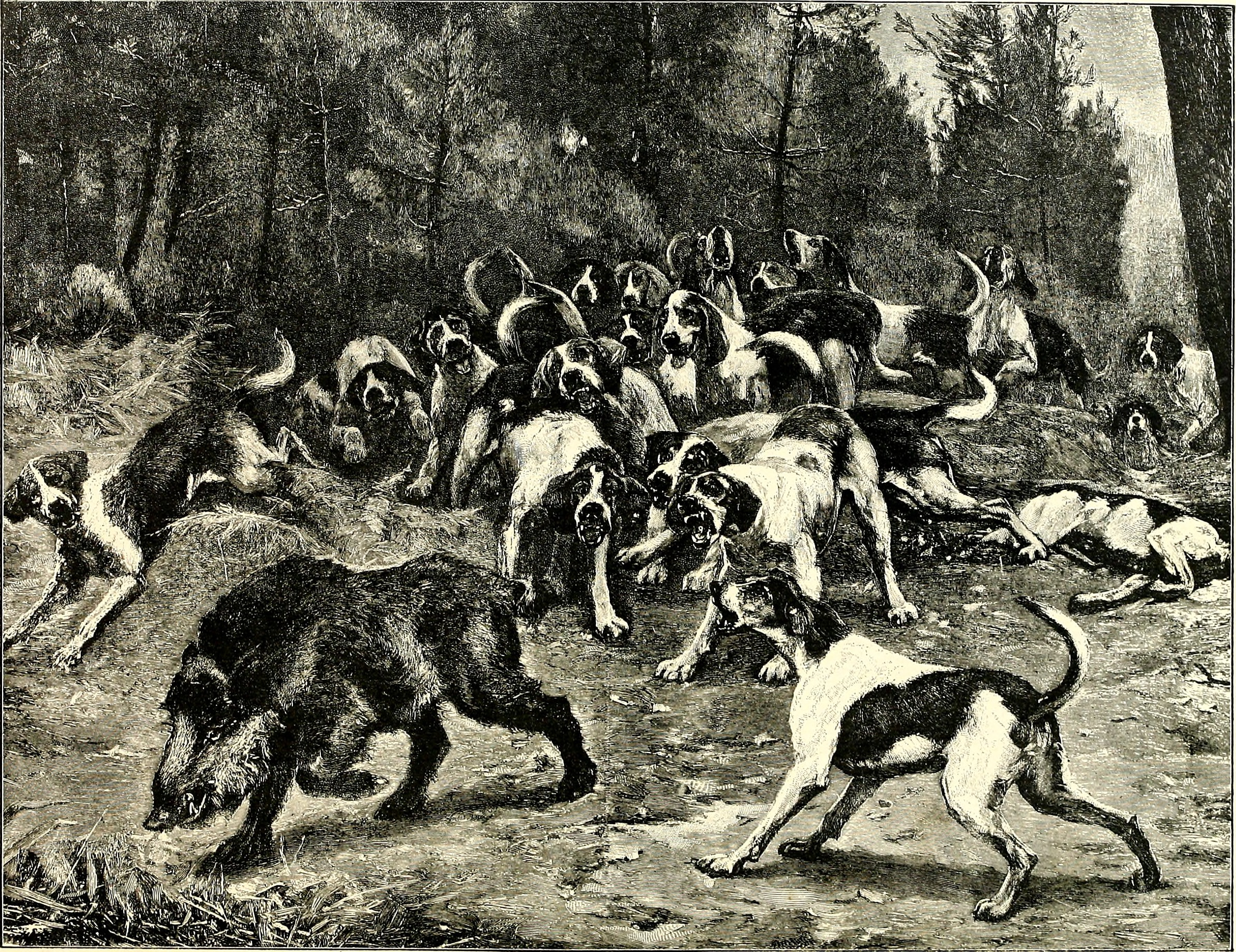
Wild boar hunt with bay dogs, circa 1900

A bay dog (or bailer, in Australian English) is a dog that is specially trained to find, chase, and then bay, or howl, at a safe distance from large animals during a hunt, such as during a wild boar hunt.

Bay dogs chase and circle the boar, keeping it cornered in one place, while barking intensely. This behavior is known as "baying" or keeping the boar "at bay". In Australia the terms "bay dogs" and "baying" are not in common usage; these are colloquially referred to as "bailers" and "bailing", respectively.

The vocalizing of the dogs at bay signals the modern firearms hunter to close the distance with the pack and once caught up, to dispatch the boar with a well-placed gunshot. For the primitive weapons hunter, the bay signals the hunters to release the "catch dogs" that are used to then catch and hold the boar, allowing hunters to hog-tie the boar for relocation or kill the boar with a knife, spear or similar instrument. The dogs used for baying are typically curs, hounds, and various purpose-bred crosses. Some crossing has occurred between "bay and catch" dogs, due to being raised together for generations, along with purpose-breeding. As a result, some "hog dogs" have shared traits and abilities (i.e., bay dogs capable of holding, or catch dogs hunting by scent). However, they are usually kept separate (no crossing) and used according to their own unique abilities.

This technique is also the traditional way to hunt moose in the northern Scandinavian forests using the native spitz hounds, where it allows the hunter to stealthily move close to the animal in the dense forests, only taking a step when the dog barks to cover any sound, sometimes having to move as close as 10 to 30 meters to get a shot through the brush. Very often this is used in conjuncture with a team of hunters using fixed positions to take moose moving away from the baying dog.

== Bay dog breeds ==
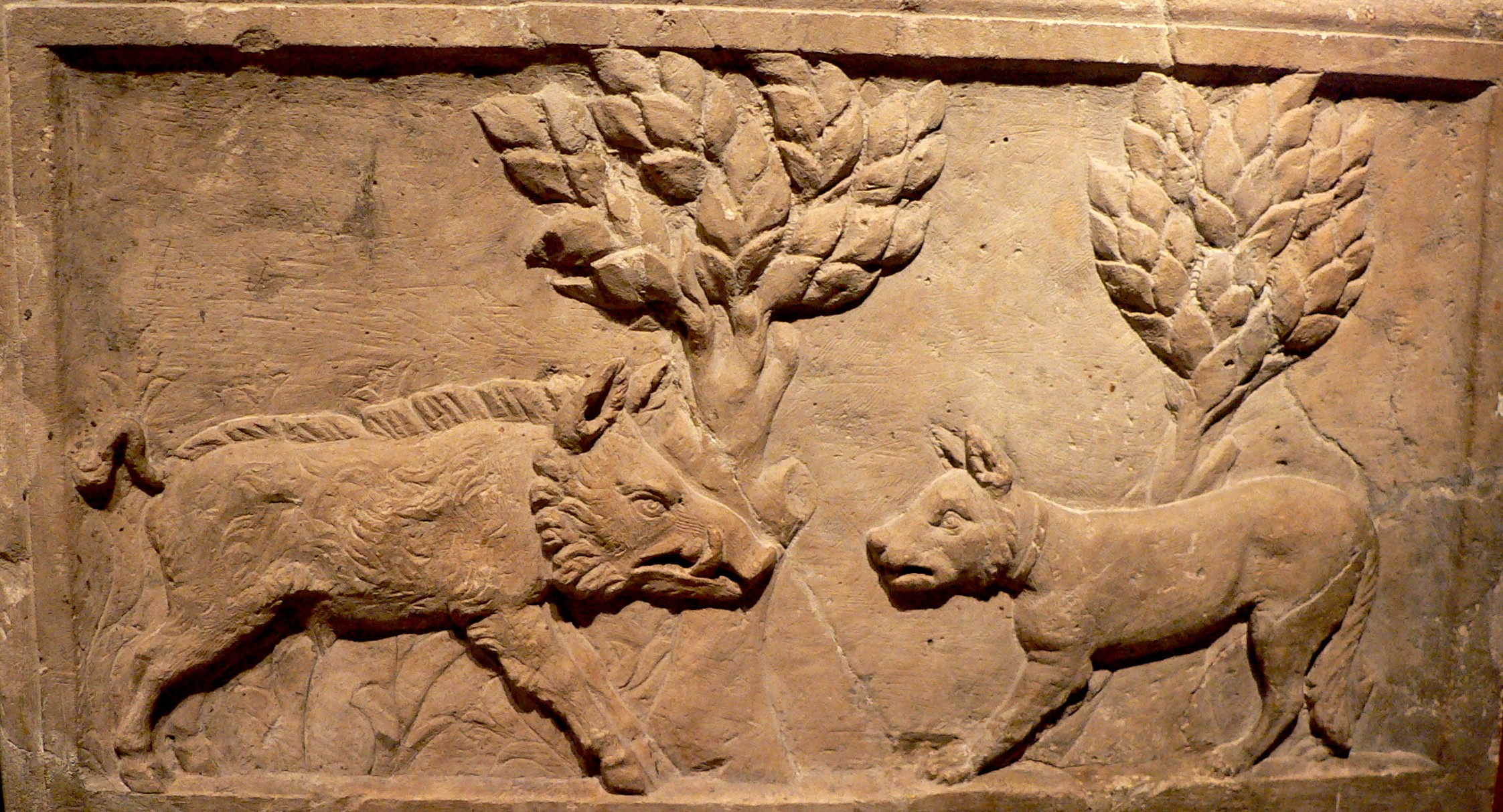
Roman relief, c. 3rd century, of hunting wild boar with a bay dog

In southern Africa:

- Grand Bleu de Gascogne
- Rhodesian Ridgeback

In Scandinavia:

- Grå Norsk Elghund (Norwegian Elkhound in English)
- Jämthund (Swedish Elkhound in English)
- Karelian Bear Dog

In the United Kingdom:

- Jack Russell Terrier

In the United States:

- Black Mouth Cur
- Blue Lacy
- Mountain Cur
- Louisiana Catahoula Leopard Dog
- Plott Hound
- Redbone Coonhound

== See also ==
- Uncle Earl's Hog Dog Trials
