= Courthouse dog =

Courthouse dog may refer to:

- Courthouse Dogs Foundation, a non-profit organization promoting the use of courthouse facility dogs
- Courthouse facility dog, a type of assistance dog that is handled by a professional working in the legal system
