= Doddle =

Doddle may refer to:

- Doddle Parcels, a UK logistics company
- A British slang term meaning something simple or easy to accomplish

== See also ==
- Doodle (disambiguation)
- Dodie
