= Goldendoodle =

Crossbreed of dog

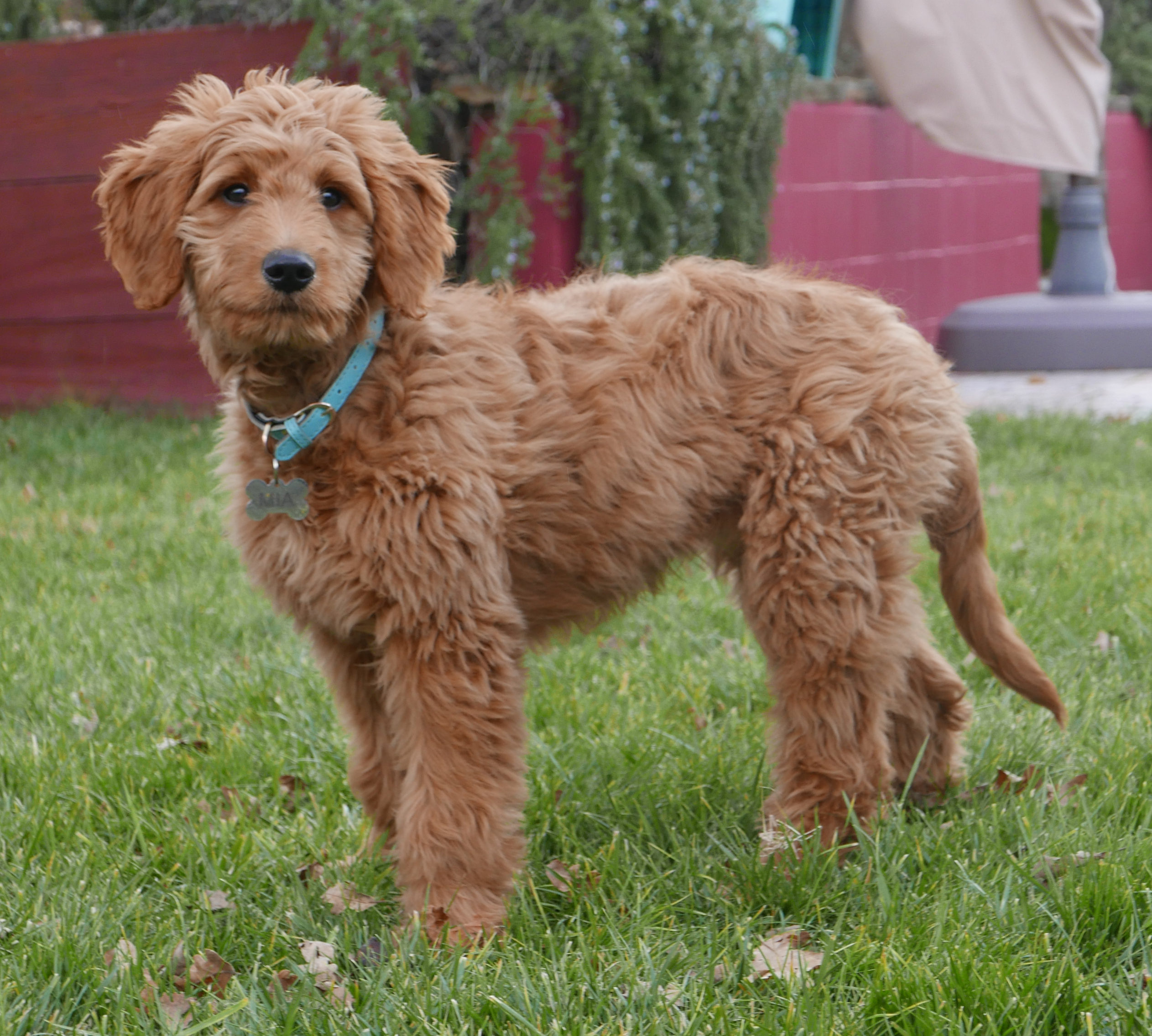
- Common nicknames: Doodle
- Origin: Australia & United States
- Foundation stock: Golden Retriever & Poodle
- Breed status: Not recognized as a breed by any major kennel club.
Traits
- Height: Typically 17–24 in (43–61 cm)
	Males	22 inches
	Females	20 inches
- Weight: Typically 15–80 lb (6.8–36.3 kg)
	Males	55–75 Lbs
	Females	40–65 Lbs
- Coat: Long haired
- Color: Cream, red, black, gold, apricot, brown, white or a combination
- Litter size: 3–6

The Goldendoodle is a designer dog created by crossbreeding a Golden Retriever and a Poodle. First widely bred in the 1990s, they are bred in three different sizes, each corresponding to the size of Poodle used as a parent.

Goldendoodles often demonstrate Golden Retrievers' intuitive and human-oriented nature in addition to the intelligent personality and the coat of a Poodle.

== History ==
In the 1990s, designer dog breeders in Australia and the United States started to widely cross Golden Retrievers and Poodles, adopting the term goldendoodle to describe the cross. The name doodle is also used to describe this crossbreed. The name goldendoodle is derived from "golden" (from Golden Retriever) and "Labradoodle" (itself a portmanteau of Labrador Retriever and a Poodle). The word "doodle" in this context is a product of rebracketing the word "Labrad‧oodle" into "Labra‧doodle". Deliberately breeding Poodles with Golden Retrievers actually preceded the 1990s. An example of this was done by Monica Dickens, the great-granddaughter of Charles Dickens, who crossed the two breeds in 1969. The cross can result in a healthier animal than either of the parent breeds.

The original aim of the goldendoodle's breeders was to produce an alternative to the popular labradoodle. Initially goldendoodles were only bred from standard-sized Poodles, but designer breeders also started using small varieties of Poodles to create a smaller crossbreed. As they are a crossbreed, they are not recognized by the AKC, FCI or British Kennel Clubs. Goldendoodles have been developed beyond the F1 hybrid (Golden Retriever crossed with a Poodle) and are now available in deeper generations created by crossing two goldendoodles. These are called multigenerational or multigen goldendoodles.

== Characteristics ==
=== Appearance ===
The appearance, size, and coat of goldendoodles can vary considerably according to their breeding generations and what type of Poodle parents they have. While some goldendoodles share common traits, each goldendoodle might have its own unique appearance and temperament.

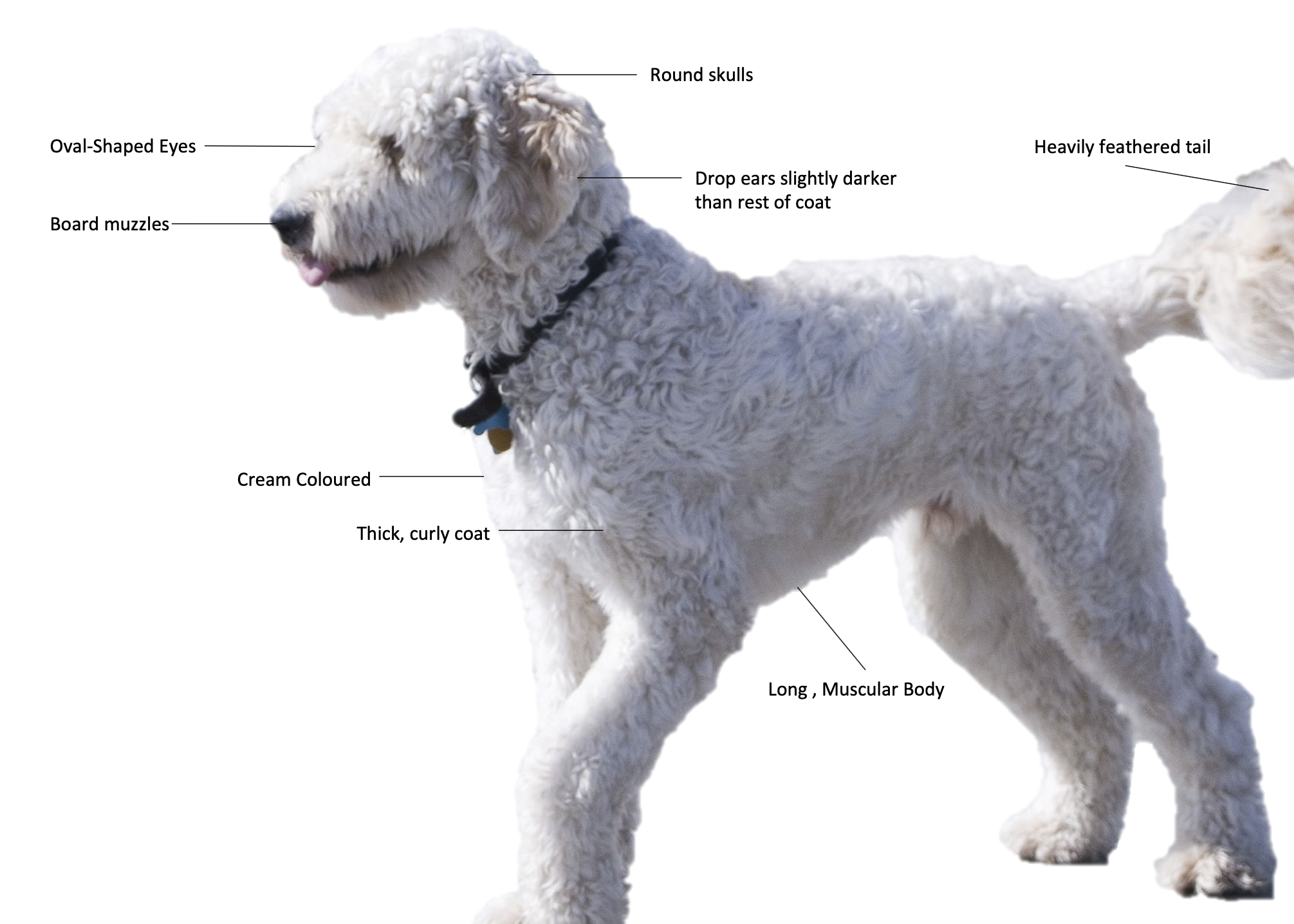
Illustration detailing goldendoodles' physical appearance

In general, goldendoodles have round skulls, broad muzzles, heavily feathered tail, drop ears, and oval-shaped eyes. Goldendoodles' retriever parentage makes their body long and muscular, and likely to have a deep chest and wide stance.

The goldendoodle can be bred from any one of the Standard, Miniature or Toy-sized Poodles, the resultant offspring coming in several sizes: the standard, medium and miniature goldendoodles. The standard goldendoodle typically stands 20 to 25 inches (51 to 64 cm) and weighs 51 to 80 pounds (23 to 36 kg), the medium goldendoodle typically stands 17 to 20 inches (43 to 51 cm) and weighs 36 to 50 pounds (16 to 23 kg), and the miniature goldendoodle typically stands up to 20 inches (51 cm) and weighs 15 to 35 pounds (6.8 to 15.9 kg)

The goldendoodle is a long-haired dog breed and their coat can vary considerably, there are three main coat types: straight, wavy and curly. Wavy coated goldendoodles are a combination of the Poodle's curly coat and the Golden Retriever's straight coat. Their coat is wavy, with loose, shaggy curls. This type of coat is the most common amongst goldendoodles. Curly coated goldendoodles resemble the coat of a Poodle. Their coat is thick and curly. Goldendoodle coats come in varying colors, with the most common colors being cream, red, black, gold, apricot, brown, or a combination (parti-colored).

Goldendoodles are often claimed to be 'hypoallergenic' or 'non-shedding'. However research has shown that hypoallergenicity can not be an official dog breed characteristic. AKC also asserts that "there is no such thing as a completely hypoallergenic dog".

It used to be thought that the higher the percentage of Poodle is in a goldendoodle's heritage, the less likely it is to shed. It was also thought that curlier coated goldendoodles tend to shed lighter and produce less dander.

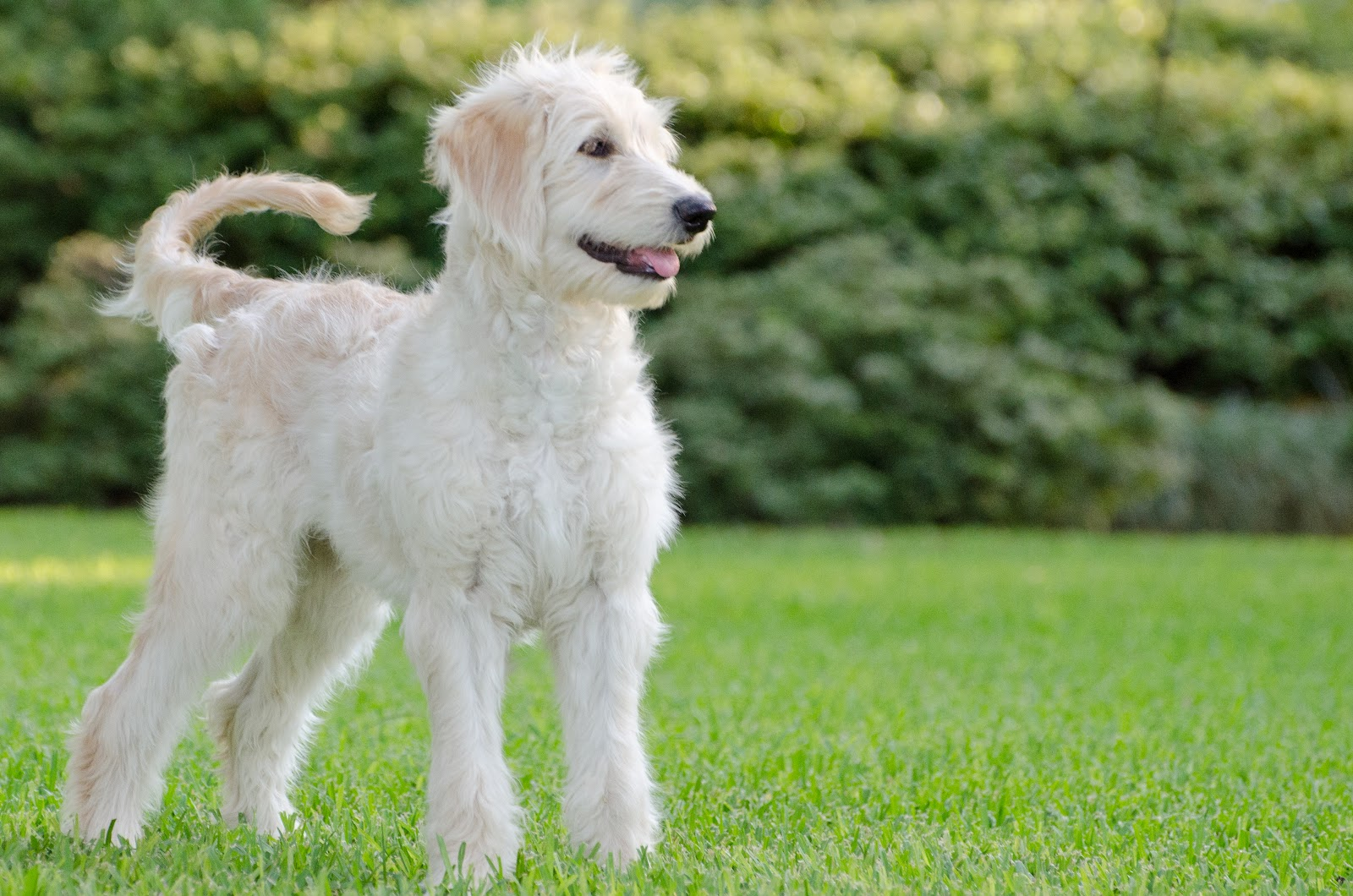
Cream goldendoodle

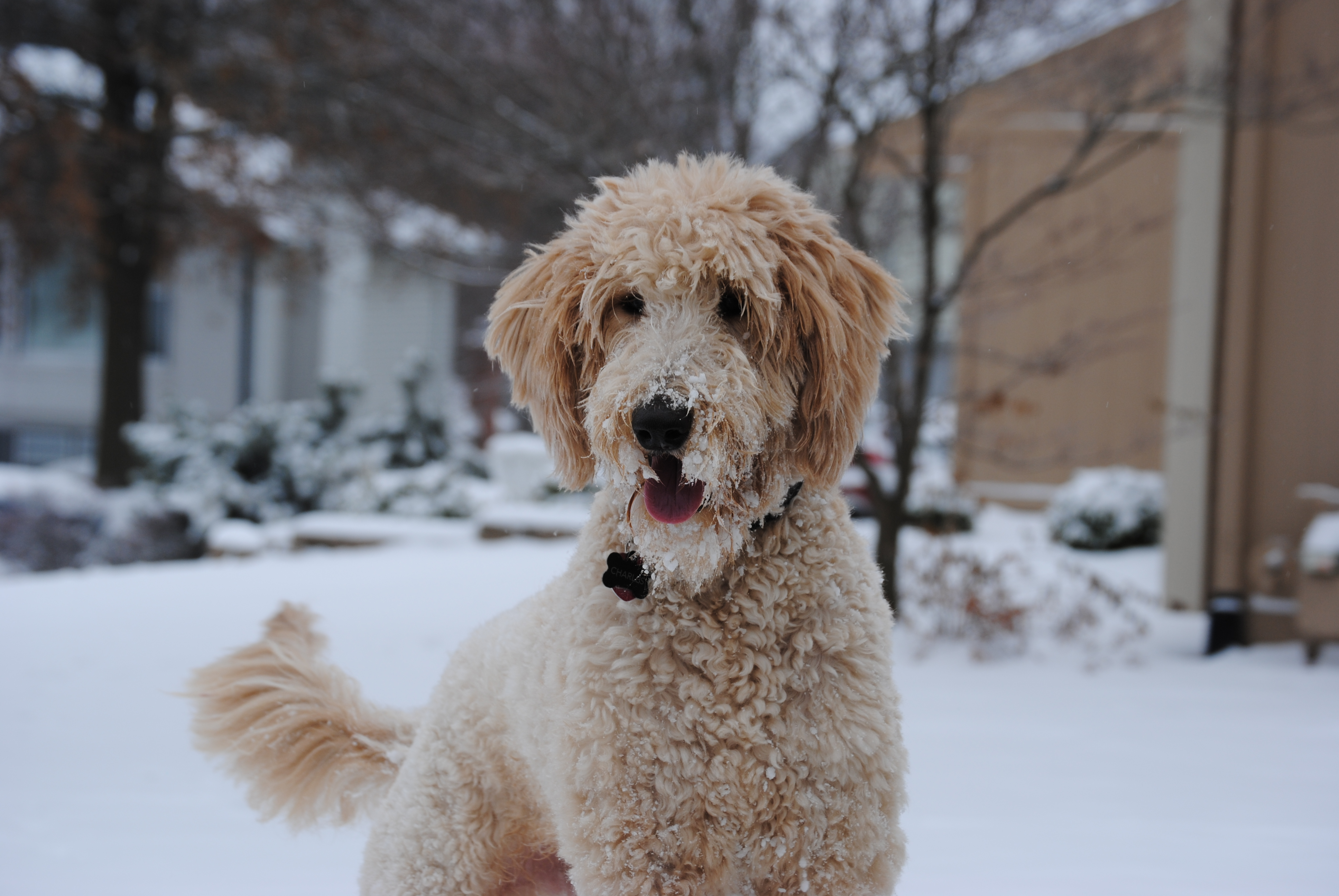
Apricot goldendoodle

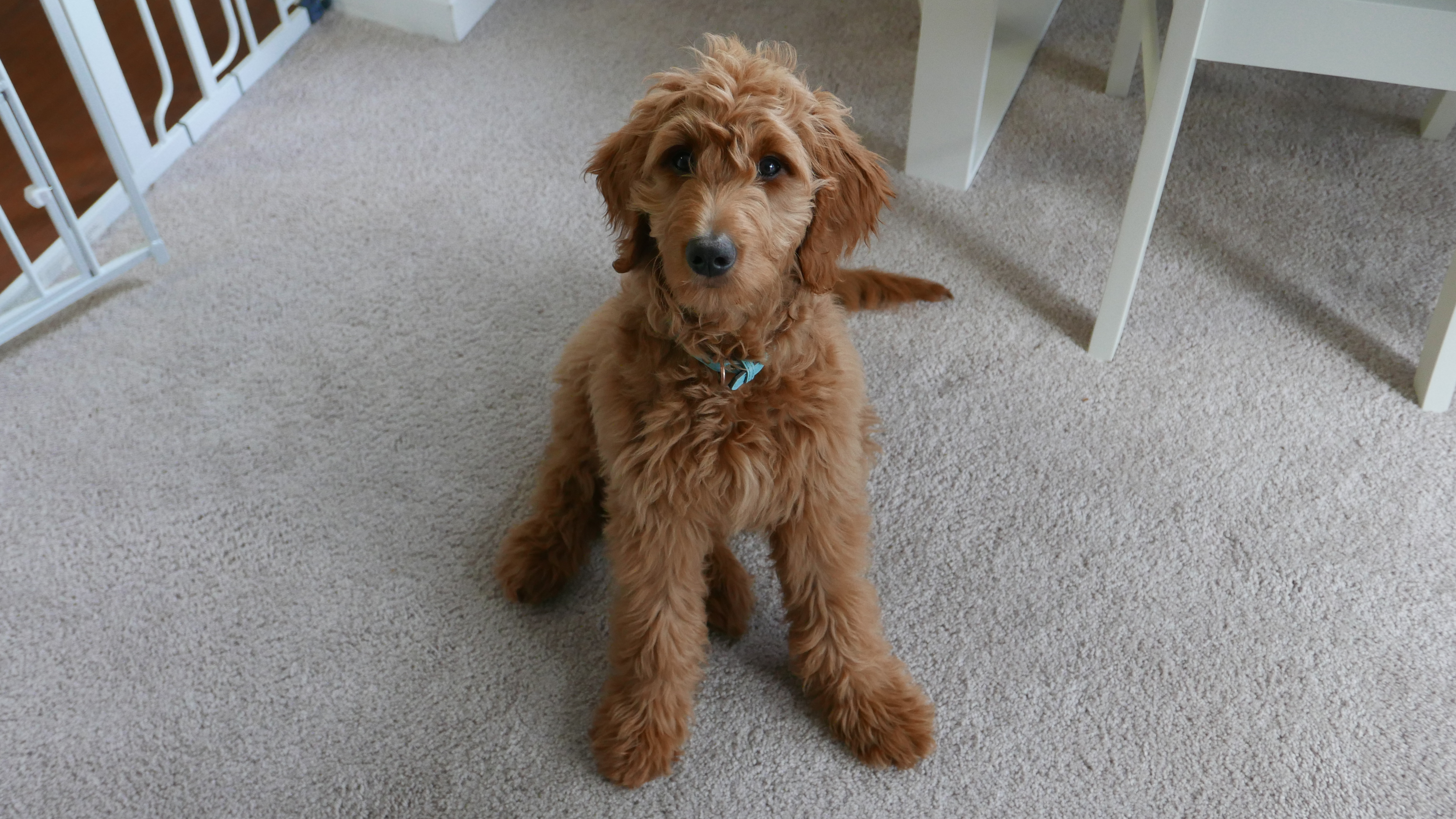
Red goldendoodle

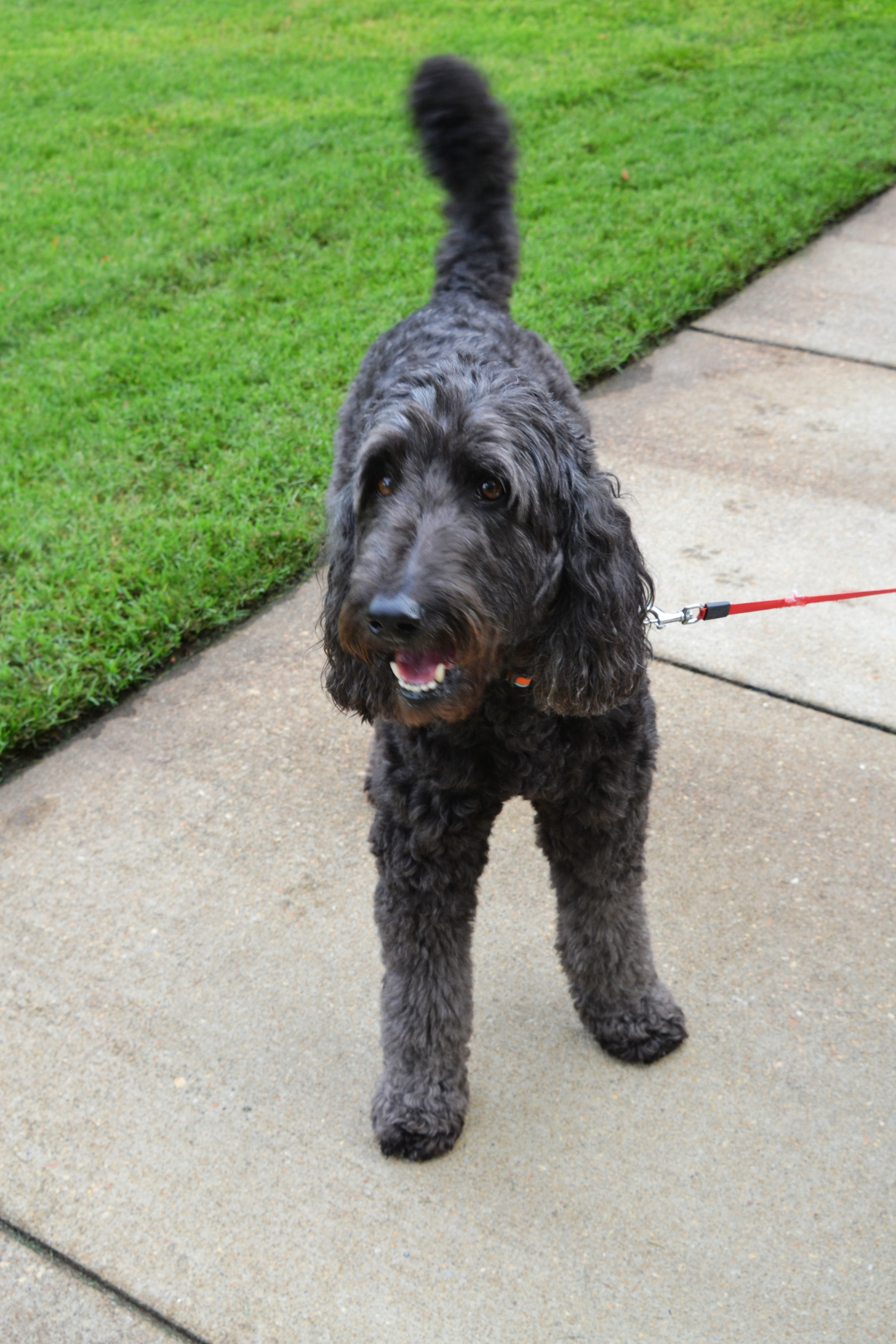
Black goldendoodle

=== Behavior ===
In general, goldendoodles tend to take on a Golden Retriever’s friendly, affectionate, trustworthy, outgoing, and enthusiastic nature, whilst also demonstrating a Poodle’s reputable intelligence, sociability and trainability. Goldendoodles predominantly exhibit high levels of energy, loyalty and playfulness; they are often friendly with children and considered a good family pet. This friendliness and loyalty, however, means they are prone to separation anxiety, especially as puppies. The crossbreed often exhibits strong retriever instincts inherited from its gundog parent breeds, which make them have an active mouth and high tendency to retrieve objects.

A 2019 behavioural study compared goldendoodles to their parent breeds and found that, on average, goldendoodles displayed significantly lower dog-rivalry than purebred Miniature Poodles, and significantly higher dog-directed aggression, dog-directed fear, and stranger-directed fear than purebred Golden Retrievers, Miniature Poodles, or Standard Poodles.

== Health ==
Goldendoodles may avoid inheriting disease or health issues from parents, but may alternatively be susceptible to more health issues if the parents are unhealthy to begin with.

Goldendoodles are prone to megaesophagus.

== Popularity and uses ==
Primarily bred as companion dogs, goldendoodles have been successfully trained as therapy dogs, guide dogs, nut-detection dogs detecting nuts in food for people with nut allergies, and other forms of assistance dogs.

In some regions of the United States it has become one of the most popular dog varieties. In Australia, it was named one of the top twenty most popular dog varieties in 2020 where, due to the increased demand for pets during the COVID-19 pandemic, prices for a puppy have risen from around $3,500 AUD before the pandemic, to as much as $15,000 AUD by September 2020.

In a 2012 charity auction, American musician Usher paid US$12,000 for a goldendoodle puppy.

Despite their growing popularity, goldendoodles remain unrecognized by prominent canine organizations such as the American Kennel Club (AKC) or British Kennel Clubs due to their hybrid status.

== See also ==
- List of dog crossbreeds
- Doodle (disambiguation)
