= Misto Dobra =

Ukrainian charity

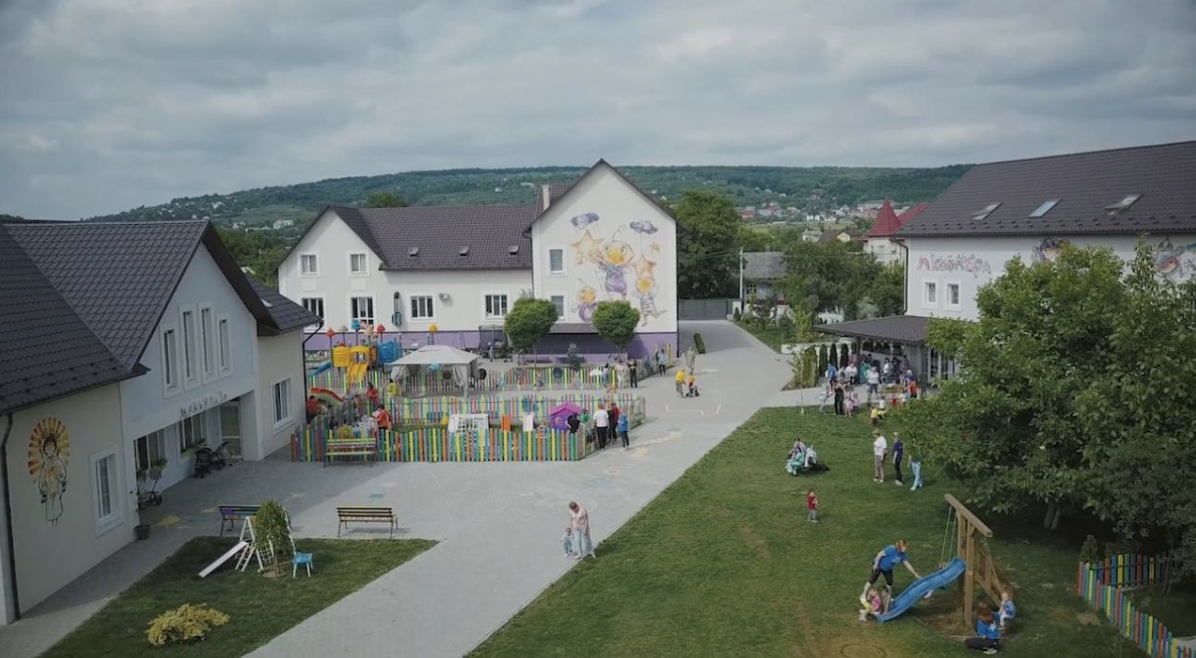
This image shows part of the City of Goodness (Misto Dobra) complex, featuring residential buildings and a playground.

The City of Goodness, or Misto Dobra, is a prominent shelter in Ukrainian city Chernivtsi providing free accommodation and comprehensive support to women, children, the elderly, and rescued animals. Established in 2020, the organization operates on donations and addresses the needs of those affected by war, domestic violence, or challenging life circumstances. The facility can accommodate up to 400 people and 35 animals.

== History ==
The City of Goodness was founded by Ukrainian activist Marta Levchenko, who launched the initiative in 2016 under the name "Marta's Dream". Initially operating from a rented building, the organization acquired land in 2017, allowing for the construction of a permanent shelter. The facility officially opened in 2020. In response to the 2022 conflict in Ukraine, the shelter expanded to include new facilities for evacuated children, introduced a medical center and canine-therapy in 2023. Future plans involve launching an inclusive school by 2025-2026.

== Projects ==
- Medical Center "Butterflies": Specializes in providing palliative care, rehabilitation services, and psychological support to patients and their families, focusing on improving quality of life during serious illness.
- Women's Rights Protection Department: Offers legal aid and social support to survivors of domestic violence, promoting safety, justice, and empowerment for women.
- "Mama Shye" Academy: A vocational training program designed to help women gain economic independence through professional sewing and tailoring education.
- Canine-therapy Center "Tails": Provides animal-assisted therapy to promote emotional recovery and mental well-being, particularly for children and those coping with trauma.
- School for Mothers: Offers educational programs on parenting, child development, and strategies for self-reliance, helping mothers build stronger families.
- "Bukovynian Dream" Festival: An annual event dedicated to fulfilling the dreams of children in need, creating joyful and transformative experiences.

== Role During the War ==
During the 2022 Russian invasion of Ukraine, the City of Goodness emerged as a critical support center. It facilitated the evacuation of children from combat zones and continued to provide medical and psychological care. The shelter also attends to animals rescued from frontline areas.

== Licensing ==
The City of Goodness operates in compliance with Ukrainian legislation and holds such licences:

- Continuing Professional Development Provider: Registration number 1479.
- License for Use of Precursors: Order of the State Service of Ukraine on Medicines and Drugs Control No. 216 dated 15.02.2025.
- Medical Practice License: Decision of the Ministry of Health of Ukraine No. 1603 dated 11.09.2023.
