= Courthouse Dogs Foundation =

American non-profit organization

The logo of the Courthouse Dogs Foundation. COURTHOUSE DOGS and the Courthouse Dogs Logo are registered trademarks of the Courthouse Dogs Foundation.

The Courthouse Dogs Foundation (Courthouse Dogs) is a non-profit organization that trains professionals involved in the legal system about how courthouse facility dogs that are graduates from assistance dog organizations that are members of Assistance Dogs International (ADI) can assist them in the investigation and prosecution of crimes and other legal proceedings. Based on a practice that developed in Seattle, Washington, in 2003, the foundation was founded in 2012 by former prosecuting attorney Ellen O'Neill-Stephens and veterinarian Celeste Walsen. The Courthouse Dogs Foundation is based in Bellevue, Washington.

== History ==
The use of assistance dogs working in the legal system first began in 2003 when Ellen O'Neill-Stephens, a King County senior deputy prosecuting attorney in Seattle, started bringing an off-duty service dog to juvenile drug court, forensic interviews, and courtroom proceedings.

In 2008, O'Neill-Stephens partnered with Celeste Walsen DVM and jointly established Courthouse Dogs, LLC. They coined the term "Courthouse Dogs" to describe facility dogs who assist legal professionals with the investigation and prosecution of crimes, and also launched an educational website titled Courthouse Dogs. Shortly after, the actual canines working in these legal settings began to be referred to as courthouse facility dogs. Together, O'Neill-Stephens and Walsen began presenting and training attorneys, victim advocates, child advocacy centers, and others working in the legal system about how they could use facility dogs. They conducted these trainings throughout the United States, Canada, and Chile.

In July 2012, Courthouse Dogs, LLC partners O'Neill-Stephens and Walsen donated their intellectual property to the Courthouse Dogs Foundation. Courthouse Dogs Foundation (Courthouse Dogs) is a non-profit organization that trains professionals involved in the legal system about how facility dogs, that are graduates from assistance dog organizations that are members of Assistance Dogs International (ADI), can assist them in the investigation and prosecution of crimes and other legal proceedings.

== Activities ==
As an independent nonprofit organization Courthouse Dogs Foundation works to accomplish its mission by:

- Educating members of the public and legal professionals about the benefits of facility dogs.
- Guiding governmental agencies (prosecutor offices and law enforcement agencies) and nonprofit organizations (child advocacy centers and victim advocacy groups) in program development using a best practices model.
- Supporting nonprofit assistance dog organizations that train and place facility dogs.
- Encouraging and facilitating scientific research on the use of facility dogs.

== Recognition ==
In January 2013, an article featuring Courthouse Dogs was published in O, The Oprah Magazine.

In December 2013, the Hague Institute for the Internationalization of Law recognized the Courthouse Dogs Foundation as a finalist in the competition for the Successful Innovating Justice award.

In May, 2014, Courthouse Dogs Foundation received the 2014 Victims' Rights Partnership Award from the National Crime Victim Law Institute for collaborative work in advancing the rights of crime victims.

In April 2015 the Courthouse Dogs Foundation team was invited to attend Governor Asa Hutchinson's signing of the "Courthouse Dogs Child Witness Support Act" allowing child witnesses to be accompanied by a certified facility dog while testifying in criminal trials.

== Publications ==
- Facility Dogs at Children's Advocacy Centers and in Legal Proceedings - A best practices manual written by the Courthouse Dogs Foundation in association with the Western Regional Children's Advocacy Center about how to implement best practices with courthouse facility dogs at child advocacy centers.
- The Need for Standard Behavioral Screening for Therapy Dogs Working with Children - An article highlighting the differences between courthouse facility dogs and therapy dogs.
- Courthouse Dogs Go South - The Courthouse Dogs Foundation introduces Chile to using trained facility dogs in the Chilean criminal justice process and writes about the experience in an article featured in Bark Magazine.
- Courthouse Dogs - A Case Study - Courthouse facility dog Ellie helps a young boy testify against the man who assaulted his mother. Without Ellie's help, he would have been unable to testify, which would likely have affected either the jury's verdict, or the sentencing that followed.
