= Can Do Canines =

American non-profit organization

- Formation: 1987
- Founder: Alan M. Peters
- Type: Nonprofit
- Headquarters: New Hope, Minnesota, U.S.
- Services: Assistance dog training and placement
- Website: candocanines.org

Can Do Canines is a nonprofit organization based in New Hope, Minnesota. It trains and places assistance dogs with people with disabilities without any cost.

== History ==
Can Do Canines was founded in 1987 by Alan M. Peters. Alan served as the executive director of the organization until his retirement in 2020. He was succeeded by Jeff Johnson who serves as the current executive director. The organization trains and places six types of assistance dogs including mobility assistance dogs, hearing dogs, seizure response dogs, diabetes alert dogs, autism assistance dogs and facility dogs. These dogs are trained to assist in various day-to-day routine tasks and medical situations for the people with disabilities.

Many dogs are raised by volunteer puppy raisers including prisoners before beginning formal training with professional staff. According to the organization it costs about $45,000 to train each dog, but each is provided at no cost to clients.

== See also ==
- Support Dogs, Inc.
- Assistance Dogs International
