= Courthouse facility dog =

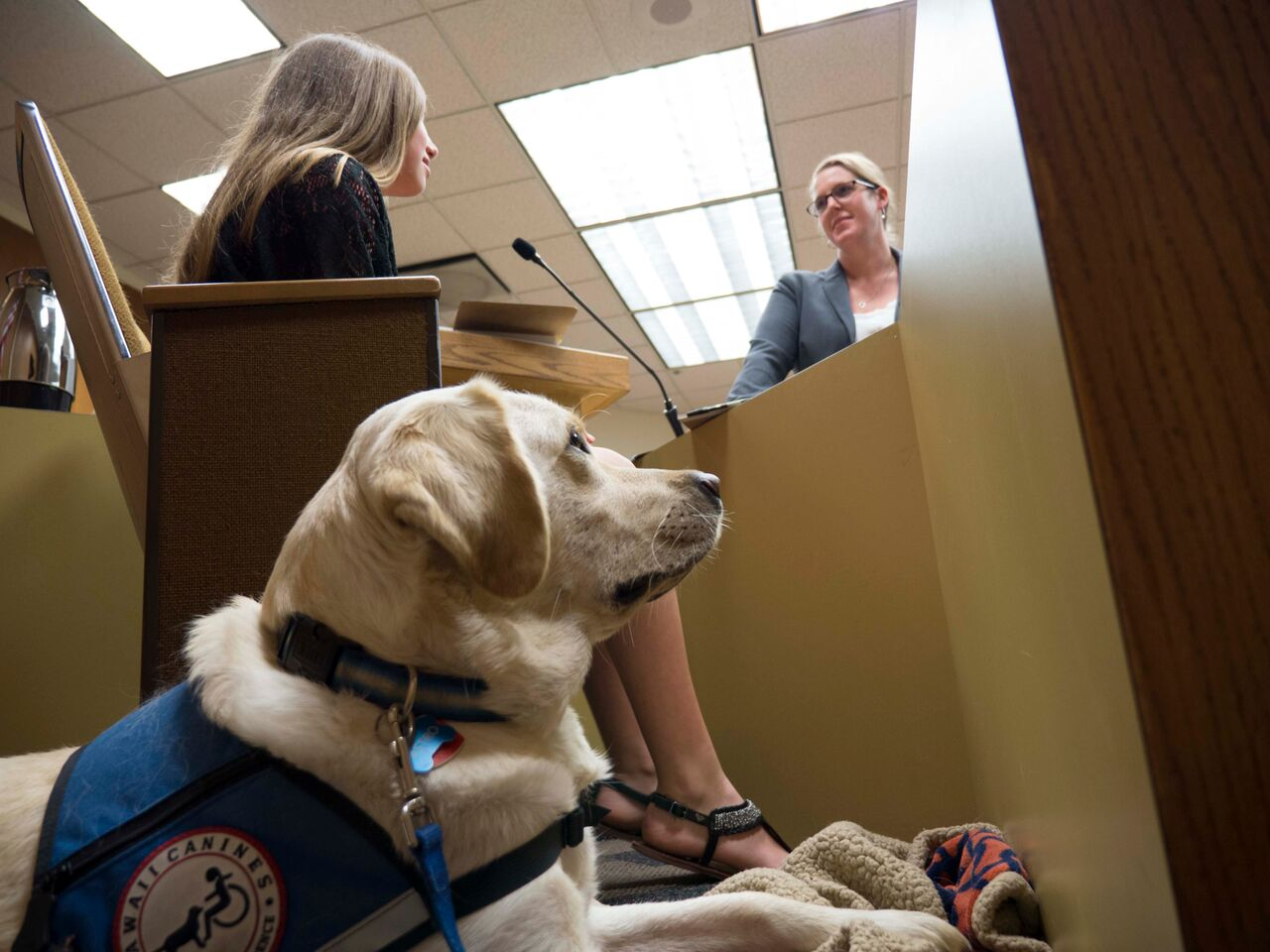
A courthouse facility dog, 2014

In the United States, a courthouse facility dog is a professionally trained facility dog that has graduated from an accredited assistance dog organization that is a member of Assistance Dogs International. Such dogs assist crime victims, witnesses and others during the investigation and prosecution of crimes, as well as during other legal proceedings. Courthouse facility dogs also provide assistance to Drug Court and Mental Health Court participants during their recovery from drugs, alcohol, mental illness and posttraumatic stress disorder.

In addition to the courthouse, these dogs work in child advocacy centers, district attorney offices, and law enforcement settings. The handlers of these dogs are professionals working in the legal system such as district attorneys, law enforcement officers, forensic interviewers, psychologists, social workers and victim advocates. Nonprofessional handlers are not utilized with courthouse facility dogs due to the confidential nature of some proceedings, and because the presence of lay people during the investigation of a crime and in the courtroom may create legal issues.

== Typical work ==
- Greeting children and parents who have come into a child advocacy center to initiate investigation of child sexual abuse
- Accompanying a child (age 4 – 17) during a forensic interview, where the child explains to a trained interviewer the details of an incident of sexual abuse or a crime of violence
- Accompanying a child during the various phases of the investigation and prosecution of crime, including a defense interview, a competency hearing, and a courtroom trial
- Greeting members of the public throughout the courthouse
- Attending drug court, mental health court, and other restorative justice proceedings to provide an element of calm to people with disabilities and individuals in drug withdrawal
- Accompanying vulnerable adult crime victims, including rape victims, developmentally delayed adults, and the elderly during court proceedings
- Providing emotional comfort to family members of homicide victims during the trial and sentencing of the offender
- Providing a sense of normalcy during juvenile and family court proceedings.

== Training ==
Courthouse facility dogs are usually bred, raised and trained by service dog organizations that are members of Assistance Dogs International, such as Canine Companions for Independence, Assistance Dogs of the West, and Support Dogs, Inc.

Facility dogs are not service dogs because they do not assist a person with a disability. Assistance Dogs International defines a facility dog and describes their training standards that must be maintained by their handlers who work as professionals in a specific setting.

Most of these dogs are either golden or Labrador retrievers or a combination of the two breeds. These dogs have typically spent eighteen months being raised by a volunteer puppy raiser with weekly obedience classes and had six months or more of work with a professional dog trainer. During this time the organization’s trainers carefully assess which facility assistance dogs have the best temperament to work in a courthouse environment.

A trained courthouse dog will have a calm demeanor and be confident. The dog is expected to be adaptable, social and work independently with many individuals throughout a day and have multiple handlers. In addition to the dog’s basic training, which involves passing a public access test, the dog will be able to tolerate people wearing a variety of clothing from all walks of life, irritated people, people struggling with drug abuse, children who invade boundaries, erratic behavior, and emotional situations. Most importantly, the dog is expected to know when to engage with people in public and when to become invisible for extended periods of time during child forensic interviews and courtroom proceedings.

The courthouse dog’s handler receives intensive training before graduating from the service dog organization with their dog. In order to protect the jurisdiction and handler of the dog, should a lawsuit be filed, these dogs often carry a minimum of one million dollars in liability insurance. Many qualified dogs carry such policies as a part of the certification process, such as the courthouse facility dogs provided by Canine Companions for Independence.

When courthouse facility dogs are off duty, they are pets that live with their primary handlers.

== Legal status ==
Although prosecuting attorneys, law enforcement officers, and victim advocates support the use of courthouse facility dogs in assisting crime victims and witnesses while they testify in court, some defense attorneys object to their use out of concern that it is prejudicial to their clients. The objection is usually based on the argument that the presence of the dog may make the prosecution witness more appealing to the jury. However, courthouse facility dogs are for everyone. If this type of dog is available and the witnesses can demonstrate to the judge that the presence of a courthouse dog would facilitate their ability to testify in court, then the dog should be made available to everyone including defendants.

The National Crime Victim Law Institute suggests that this jury instruction regarding the presence of the dog in the courtroom be provided to the jurors before deliberations to overcome unfair prejudice to either the defense or prosecution.

"Testifying in court is an unfamiliar and stressful event for most people; these dogs are used in a courthouse setting to help reduce witness anxiety and are available to any witness who requests one."

In the 2013 Washington state Supreme Court case State v Dye, the court found that it was not unduly prejudicial for facility dog Ellie who was trained by, and lives with, the prosecutor at Dye's trial. Addressing the possibility of biasing the jury with the use of the courthouse facility dog, the court found the following:

Furthermore, whatever subconscious bias may have befallen the jury was cured by the trial court's limiting instruction, which cautioned the jury not to "make any assumptions or draw any conclusions based on the presence of this service. Juries are presumed to follow instructions absent evidence to the contrary. State v. Kirkman, 159 Wn.2d 918, 928, 155 P.3d 125 (2007). No such evidence appears on the record here. The constitutional role of the jury prevents us from presuming-on the force of a bare allegation-that the jury "[made] a decision based on the dog's reaction and demeanor, not the witness's .... " Br. of Amicus Curiae Wash. Defender Ass'n & The Defender Ass'n at 14. And our own precedent compels us to respect the trial court's decision: whether or not we might have conducted the trial differently, we cannot say the trial court acted in a manifestly unreasonable manner.

== History ==
Firsts in using trained dogs to assist victims and witnesses in the criminal-justice system:

- 2003: Jeeter, a golden Labrador retriever volunteer service dog, accompanied twin sisters into King County Superior Court, Seattle during competency hearings and trial testimony.
- 2004: Canine Companions for Independence became the first assistance dog organization to place a facility dog (Ellie, a Labrador retriever mix) to work in a prosecutor’s office, in Seattle.
- 2013: Rosie, a graduate facility dog from assistance dog organization ECAD, was placed with Poughkeepsie Children's Home to assist a child who had to testify against her father in State v. Tohom.
- 2018: Duo, an assistance dog organization, made the first facility dog (Oliver, Labrador retriever mix) placement in Europe. Oliver is also the first facility dog in the world to be placed at a university (Canterbury Christ Church University, UK).

Notable events in the establishment of organizations and legislature centered around the use of courthouse facility dogs:

- 2012: The Courthouse Dogs Foundation was founded, which is a nonprofit organization advocating for and educating about the use of courthouse facility dogs.
- April 2015: Arkansas became the first state to pass a bill allowing child witnesses to testify with certified facility dogs in court.
- July 2015: Illinois became the second state to pass a measure allowing facility dogs to accompany child witnesses and developmentally challenged adults during testimony in court.
- May 2016: Arizona became the third state to allow child witnesses to testify with a courthouse facility dog.
- June 2016: Hawaii became the fourth state to allow child witnesses to testify with a courthouse facility dog.
- June 2017: Alabama passed SB273 Koda's Law allowing equal access and Courthouse privileges for Therapy dogs and Facility dogs to accompany witnesses in court. Facility dogs may be trained through any assistance dogs organization.
- January 2018: The Justice Support Dogs International Lab was founded by Dr Elizabeth Spruin. The Lab was established to prompt the use of facility dogs in the UK Criminal Justice System and to help build an evidence base for these practices.

Since 2003, the use of courthouse facility dogs has spread throughout the United States and internationally.

== See also ==
- Working dog – Dog trained to perform practical tasks
