= Blue Yonder =

Software and consultancy company

Blue Yonder Group, Inc.
- Formerly: JDA Software
- Type: Subsidiary
- Industry: Supply chain management, manufacturing, retail, commerce, logistics, consumer goods
- Founded: 1985; 41 years ago (as JDA)
- Founders: James Donald Armstrong; Frederick M. Pakis
- Headquarters: Scottsdale, Arizona
- Area served: Worldwide
- Key people: Duncan Angove (CEO)
- Products: Software
- Revenue: ▲$1.42 Billion (2025)
- Number of employees: 8,000 (October 2024)
- Parent: Panasonic
- Website: blueyonder.com

Blue Yonder Group, Inc. (formerly JDA Software Group) is an American supply chain management company operating as an independent subsidiary of multinational holding company Panasonic Corporation. Founded in 1985, the company is headquartered in Scottsdale, Arizona, with offices globally, and an innovation center in Dallas, Texas.

== History ==
=== Early history ===
In 1978, in Calgary, Canada, James Donald Armstrong founded a company that focused on IBM's System/3X platforms. In 1985, Armstrong sold that business and moved to Cleveland, Ohio, where he and Frederick M. Pakis formed the US-based JDA Software, Inc. After signing a contract with a Phoenix-based automotive retailer in 1987, all eight JDA employees relocated to the headquarters in Arizona. After 10 years of operation as a privately held firm, JDA went public on March 15, 1996.

=== Acquisitions ===
In June 1998, JDA acquired Comshare's Arthur Retail unit for $44 million. In April 2000, the company acquired Swedish space management software company Intactix for $20.5 million. In September 2001, they acquired inventory optimization company E3. In 2006, they acquired Manugistics Group Inc., a Rockville, MD developer and provider of supply chain management software, for over $200 million. On August 11, 2008, JDA announced its intent to acquire i2 Technologies, a Dallas-based provider of supply chain management software, for $346 million. The acquisition was completed in January 2010.

=== 2010-2020 ===
In June 2010, Dillard's Department Stores won a $246 million judgment against JDA subsidiary i2, claiming damages from use of two supply chain management systems. JDA announced efforts to reduce or reverse this judgment, noting Dillard's still used the software and had done so since 2000. The case was settled in 2011.

On November 1, 2012, it was reported that New Mountain Capital would purchase JDA for $1.9 billion, taking JDA private and merging it with software company RedPrairie. The merged companies moved forward under the JDA Software name.

On August 8, 2016, JDA was reported to be exploring its sale to Honeywell International Inc. for $3 billion. The sale was challenged on August 16, 2016 by The Blackstone Group, giving an alternative to JDA by offering a financing plan and purchasing a minority stake in the company, with New Mountain Capital remaining its majority stakeholder.

On January 30, 2017, former Tyco International executive vice president Girish Rishi succeeded Bal Dail as CEO. Michael Capellas was named as the company's new chairman.

=== 2020-present ===
Following its acquisition of German artificial intelligence firm Blue Yonder GmbH in 2018, on February 11, 2020, JDA announced that it was renaming itself to Blue Yonder, Inc.

On July 23, 2020, Blue Yonder announced the acquisition of Yantriks, a SaaS provider of commerce and fulfillment micro-services.

On April 21, 2021, Panasonic announced that it had agreed to acquire Blue Yonder from Blackstone and New Mountain Capital for $7.1 billion. Panasonic had taken a 20% minority stake in Blue Yonder in 2020. The acquisition was closed on September 17, 2021. The company operates under the umbrella of the Panasonic Connect group.

In February 2022, Girish Rishi stepped down as CEO. In July 2022, Duncan Angove, a former executive at Infor and Oracle, was announced as the new CEO.

In 2023, Blue Yonder acquired Doddle Parcels, a UK-based logistics company. On February 7, 2024, Blue Yonder acquired flexis AG, a Germany-based manufacturing and supply chain technology company. On August 1, 2024, Blue Yonder acquired American digital supply chain network company One Network Enterprises for $839 million.

In November 2024, Blue Yonder announced that it had experienced a ransomware attack. The Termite group took credit for the cyberattack. The cybercriminals claimed to have stolen 680 GB of data from the company. On December 12, 2024, Blue Yonder said that it had restored normal operations for the majority of its impacted customers.

In May 2025, the company announced it had acquired Pledge Earth Technologies, a British firm that offers carbon emissions measuring and reporting. In June 2025, through its subsidiary Doddle, Blue Yonder acquired Inmar Post-Purchase Solutions, renaming it Blue Yonder Reverse Retail Operations. The company supports FedEx Easy Returns, which launched in March 2025. That same year, Blue Yonder also acquired logistics technology company, Optoro Inc.

In 2026, Kelley Lear was appointed as the corporate vice president and general manager of global alliances.

The company holds an annual three-day supply chain user conference called ICON, held in a different city each year.

== Products ==
Blue Yonder provides organizations with digital supply chain software through its AI-powered platform and an interoperable suite of applications. It offers solutions for integrated demand and supply planning, integrated business planning, omni-channel commerce, order and returns management, logistics, transportation and warehouse management.

At its ICON 2025 conference in Nashville, the company announced its platform's Cognitive Solutions, built on Microsoft Azure AI and Snowflake's AI Data Cloud with specialized knowledge graphs. It features five new generative AI agents in inventory, warehouse, logistics, shelf, and network operations, designed to refine workflows across the supply chain. They also announced a new tariffs agent to help companies minimize the impact of rising tariffs, announced Sustainable Supply Chain Manager, and launched Agent Activation Advisory to help companies activate AI agents.

In March 2026, Blue Yonder announced updates to its Cognitive Solutions, including an expanded set of AI agents and role-specific mobile applications, to help businesses address issues in inventory and supply, warehouse operations, shelf and planogram compliance, logistics execution, and allocation and replenishment.

At its ICON 2026 conference in San Diego in May 2026, Blue Yonder announced its Model Training Factory, a new platform built on NVIDIA Nemotron that teaches AI models to perform high-value tasks at the level of supply chain experts, to accelerate the development of specialized AI agents for the autonomous supply chain. The company also announced additional AI capabilities for automating complex supply chain decisions, and a partnership with Syndigo to integrate Syndigo's product experience management capabilities with Blue Yonder's platform, to improve the accuracy of its product data. In August 2026, the company added new agentic AI capabilities to help retailers identify and address supply chain issues, across inventory, fulfillment, customer service, and returns.
