= Therapy dog =

Dog with specific therapy training

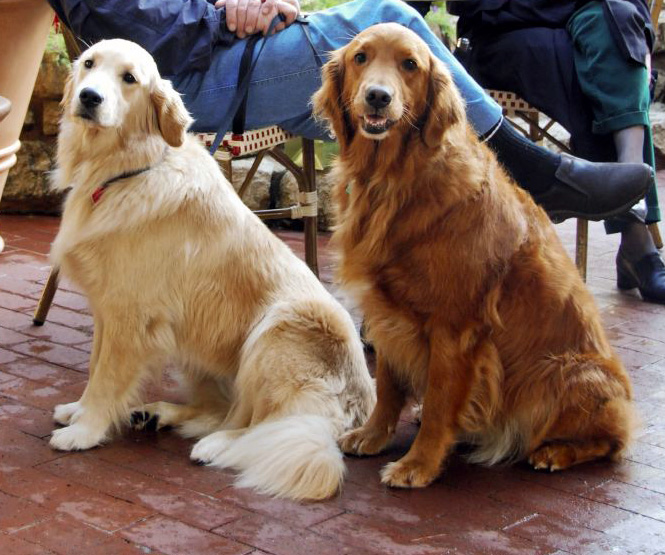
Golden Retrievers are often used as therapy dogs due to their calm demeanor, gentle disposition, and friendliness to strangers.

A therapy dog is a dog that is trained to provide affection, comfort and support to people, often in settings such as hospitals, retirement homes, nursing homes, schools, libraries, hospices, or disaster areas. In contrast to assistance dogs, which are trained to assist specific patients with their day-to-day physical needs, therapy dogs are trained to interact with all kinds of people, not just their handlers.

== History ==
Dogs have been utilized as a therapeutic resource by many medical professionals over the last few centuries. In the late 1800s, Florence Nightingale observed that small pets helped reduce anxiety and improve recovery in children and adults living in psychiatric institutions. Sigmund Freud began using his own pet dog to improve communication with his psychiatric patients in the 1930s. More recently, Elaine Smith established the first therapy dog organization in 1976 after observing positive effects of dogs on hospital patients during her work as a registered nurse. Assistance Dogs International followed in 1986, with the merger of several organizations.

In 1919, Franklin K. Lane, the U.S. Secretary of the Interior at the time, proposed utilizing dogs with psychiatric patients at St. Elizabeth's Hospital in Washington, D.C. Florence Nightingale also contributed ideas to the future field of Animal Assisted Therapy (AAT). She discovered that patients of different ages in a psychiatric institution were relieved from anxiety when they were able to spend time with small animals. Freud believed that dogs could sense certain levels of tension being felt by his patients. Freud also used his dog to improve communication with his patients. He felt as if his patients were more comfortable talking to his dog at first and this opened up doors for them to later feel more comfortable talking to him. Boris Levinson, an American child psychiatrist, was one of the first to write about animal therapy, specifically with dogs as a tool to facilitate work with a child client. Dr. Levinson found the dog's presence helped his pediatric clients with positive focus, communication, and allowing the initiation of therapy, and shared this information with the medical world in 1961. About 10 years later, psychiatrists Sam and Elizabeth Corson at Ohio State University Psychiatric Hospital used Levinson's findings to expand this form of therapy to adults. The use of therapy can also be attributed to Elaine Smith, a registered nurse. While a chaplain and his dog visited, Smith noticed the comfort that this visit seemed to bring the patients. In 1976, Smith started a program for training dogs to visit institutions, and the demand for therapy dogs continued to grow.

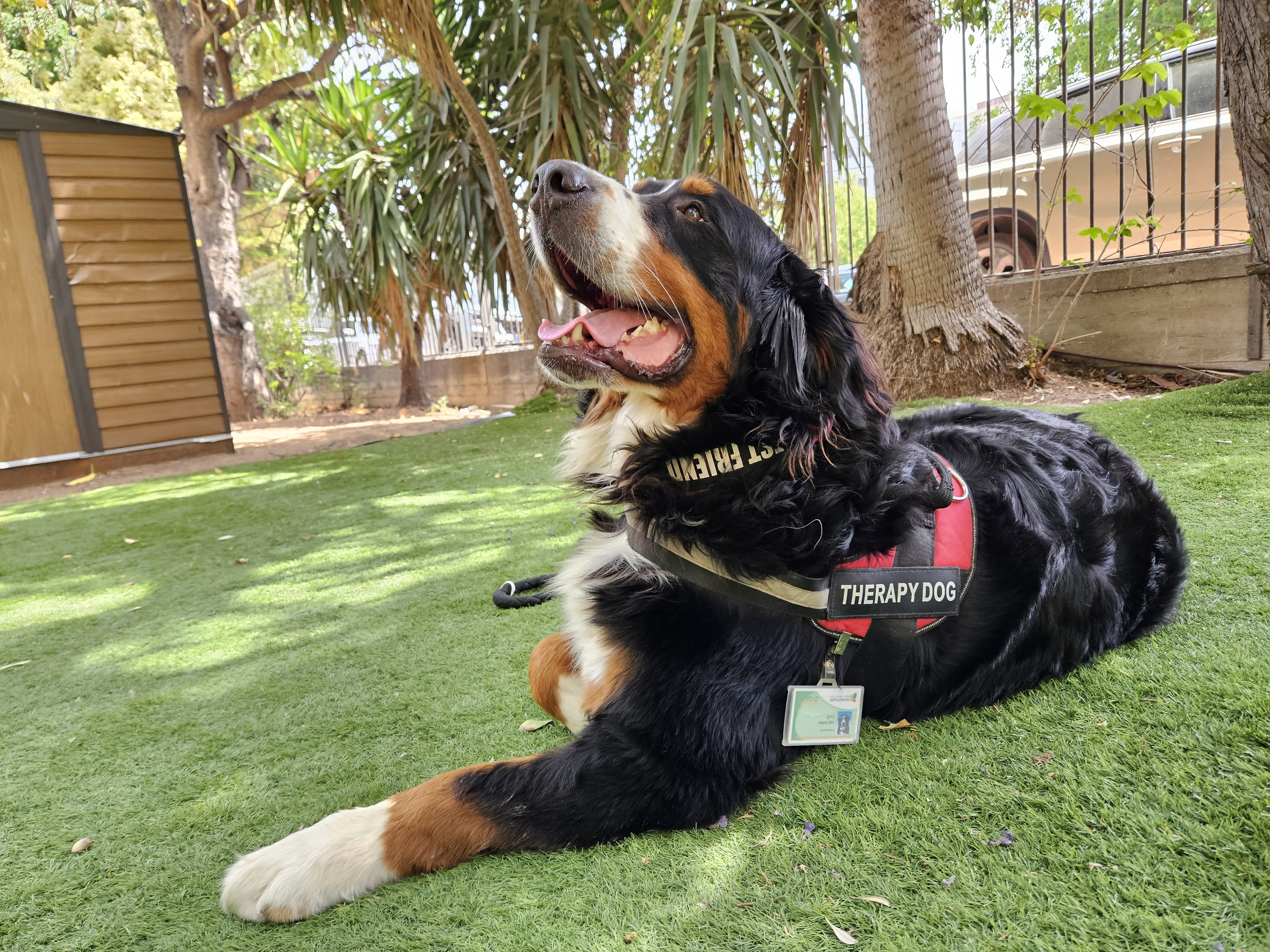
A Bernese Mountain Dog trained as a therapy dog

According to Brian Hare, director of the Duke University Canine Cognition Center, the human-canine bond can be traced back thousands of years. Hare states, "Dogs have been drawn to people since humans began to exist in settlements [...] part of what makes dogs special is that they are one of the only species that does not generally exhibit xenophobia, meaning fear of strangers. We've done research on this, and what we've found is that not only are most dogs totally not xenophobic, they're actually xenophilic – they love strangers!". Although a dog does not think according to language, people often intuit that dogs are compassionate and communicative. This builds a feeling of intimacy, leading the person to feel safe and understood. This can benefit the grieving human, who may be apprehensive about talking with another person for the fear of being hurt or lied to. Pets are an addition to therapy because they allow people to feel safe and accepted.

== Certification ==
In order for a dog to be a good candidate to become a therapy dog and receive certification, they should be calm and social with strangers. They should also be able to adjust to loud noises and fast movements. There are certain steps that are needed for a dog to become certified by a national organization such as The Alliance of Therapy Dogs. ATD requires that dogs be at least one year old, that handlers have had the dog for at least six months, and that handlers pass a background check. Health requirements include up-to-date vaccinations and a negative fecal exam within the past year. The ATD certification process begins with a handling assessment, during which an evaluator observes the dog's temperament, obedience, and the handler's ability to maintain control. If the team passes, they must complete three supervised visits in facilities such as hospitals or nursing homes before submitting paperwork for final approval. To remain active, ATD members are expected to continue visits regularly, and retesting may be required if a team lapses in visits for several months. Exact testing/certification requirements differ based on different organization's requirements. Some organizations offer classes such as "distraction-proofing", which strengthens the dog's ability to focus and therapy training to help prepare the dog and the dog's owner for therapy visits.

Although therapy dogs are not limited to a certain size or breed, common breeds used in therapy dog application and research include the Golden Retriever and the Labrador Retriever. Cavalier King Charles Spaniels and Coton de Tulear are considered natural therapy dogs since they were bred to be companion dogs. Thus, they love meeting new people including children, are very gentle, and are eager to sit on someone's lap for long periods of time and are small enough to do so.

Many organizations provide evaluation and registration for therapy dogs. Typical tests might ensure that a dog can handle sudden loud or strange noises; can walk on assorted unfamiliar surfaces comfortably; are not frightened by people with canes, wheelchairs, or unusual styles of walking or moving; get along well with children and the elderly; and so on. Institutions may invite, limit, or prohibit access by therapy dogs. If allowed, many institutions have requirements for therapy dogs. United States–based Therapy Dogs International (TDI) bans the use of service dogs in their therapy dog program. Service dogs perform tasks for persons with disabilities and have a legal right to accompany their owners in most areas.

In Canada, St John Ambulance provides therapy dog certification. In the UK, Pets As Therapy (PAT) provides visiting dogs and cats to establishments where pets are otherwise not available. Also in the UK, Therapy Dogs Nationwide (TDN) and Canine Concern CIO provide visiting dogs to establishments.

== Classification ==
The term therapy dog is used in a variety of contexts, which can lead to confusion about what it means. Therapy animals can be more precisely classified when their activity is described. These activities vary depending on the goals of the animal intervention and on whether the handler is a professional with a clear intervention goal.

=== Therapy animal ===
A therapy animal is trained to assist professionals, notably in healthcare (physical therapists, occupational therapists, social workers, nurses, psychiatrists, psychologists...) within a specific therapeutic plan to reach given goals. These animals contribute to animal-assisted interventions, for example during animal-assisted therapy.

- Animal-assisted therapy dogs (AAT): dogs that fall under this category have the duty of providing assistance to patients to reach certain goals towards their recovery. They work to help patients gain skills such as motor skills, use of limbs and hand-eye coordination. They do this by walking patients through certain activities and games to help them practice these skills. These dogs are usually based in rehabilitation facilities.
- Courthouse facility dog: dogs handled by professionals working in the legal system to assist victims and vulnerable people in court settings.

=== Visitation animal ===
A visitation animal has basic obedience and socialization skills and aims to provide comfort, companionship and social interactions in contexts such as nursing homes, hospitals or schools. These animals contribute to animal-assisted activities that aim to improve quality of life in the visited facility. These activities may be done with a volunteer human-animal team.

- Therapeutic visitation dogs. These dogs are usually household pets; the owner of these dogs will take their pets to hospitals, nursing homes or rehabilitation facilities to visit patients. These dogs are used to improve the mental health of patients through socialization and encouragement.
- Facility therapy dog: these dogs usually work in nursing homes along with their handlers. They live at the facility and help patients with Alzheimer's disease and other cognitive and mental illnesses.
- Grief therapy dog (also known as an emotional support dog, companion dog, or comfort dog): assist people in overcoming grief, which has led to a recent rise in the use of therapy dogs; although animal-assisted therapy theory has been around since World War II. Grief therapy dogs can be found in locations such as funeral homes, hospitals, nursing homes, schools, and hospices, and may provide support in situations such as funeral services, counseling sessions, and disaster relief. Popular breeds used as therapy dogs include the Portuguese Water Dog, Bernese Mountain Dog, St. Bernard, and Golden Retriever. In contrast to service dogs who assist disabled people with physical tasks, comfort dogs are not trained in skilled tasks, but serve as constant companions with a keen sense for someone feeling down. They can provide a way for people who are distressed to find sanctuary.

=== Education animal ===
An education animal assists a qualified education professional in order to help learners reach formally defined education goals. These animals contribute to animal-assisted education.

== Legal status ==
=== France ===
The terminology used in France refer to visiting dogs (dogs visiting medical facilities or participating in training about bite prevention for children), court assistance dog, social support dog (working in nursing homes), academic success assistance dog (working in schools) and mediator dog (used in animal mediation). Animals are usually forbidden by default in public administrations and medical facilities. However, facility managers or boards may decide to make exceptions for visiting dogs. The dog owner stays responsible of the damages and harm it may cause (public liability).

In 2025, a parliamentary debate was initiated about the creation of a specific legal framework for animal mediation in France. The law project proposed to define animal mediation as "practices aiming to improve people's physical, psychological and social wellbeing through interactions with animals selected and trained for this purpose if necessary. It includes all activities with therapeutic, educational, recreational, sport and personal development purposes involving interactions with an animal [...]."

=== United States ===
In the United States, therapy dogs are defined but not covered or protected under the Federal Housing Act or Americans with Disabilities Act. According to the Americans with Disabilities Act, only dogs that are "individually trained to do work or perform tasks for the benefit of an individual with a disability" have legal protection as a service animal. Therapy dogs do not have public access rights with exception to the specific places they are visiting and working. Typically the dog would be granted rights by individual facilities only. Therapy dogs are subjected to several tests to ensure that they are fit for the job. These tests look at their ability to block out distractions, comfort level around a variety of people with many different disabilities, and if they are comfortably able to walk through many different terrains.

While some states define therapy animals and emotional support animals, they are not protected by federal laws, and therefore can be prohibited from businesses, restaurants and many other locations.

== Benefits ==
Understanding the benefits of therapy dogs necessitates a distinction between animal-assisted therapy (therapy animal) and animal-assisted activity (visiting animal). Research is not always clear about this distinction.

Therapy dogs offer many benefits to people and patients. For example, therapy dogs help patients participate in physical activities. They also help encourage them to have cognitive, social, and communication goals.

=== Psychological ===
Animal Assisted Therapy (AAT) has been reported to improve many psychological conditions such as anxiety, depression, social skills, and simply improving the moods of the patient.

Additional psychological benefits of therapy dog programs in educational settings include provided comfort, companionship, a diversion to unpleasant thoughts or situations, and decreased resistance to relationship development in the therapy process.

A large number of studies show that animals can offer relief and serenity to a wide age range of vulnerable people with various different emotional issues. Ross DeJohn Jr. of DeJohn Funeral Homes in Ohio says Magic, a Portuguese water dog, "makes people smile even when they don't want to." (qtd. in Sinatra-Ayers). Amy Sather, Rincon Valley assistant principal, brings her 2-year-old Golden Retriever to the school to assist in the therapy of the children. Sather says, "I've got kids whose parents are going through a divorce and they are so depressed by it. I've had children literally hug and cry into his fur." (qtd. in Warren). Principal Brad Cosorelli claims the students will flock to the dog in time of distress instead of the counselor. Children were found during a study to find their pet (in most cases dogs) a bigger comfort in sharing secrets or scary situations than they found the adults in the family to be. In some cases, life experience has led people to believe they will be hurt by the people closest to them; animals can provide non-judgmental and unrestricted emotional support. This is true for both children and adults. In a survey done by the American Animal Hospital Association, many of those who responded specified that they were emotionally dependent on their pet. Therapists believe they can utilize clients' attachment to animals for therapeutic reasons (Urichuk). The presence of a dog in a therapy session has indicated improvements in a patient's outlook, as well as their willingness to share on a deeper level. The petting of an animal can also put a patient at ease, whereas a therapist must maintain a professional state and thus is unable to provide physical support. This creates a unique bridge for patient-therapist communication (Urichuk).

==== Psychological benefits in school setting ====
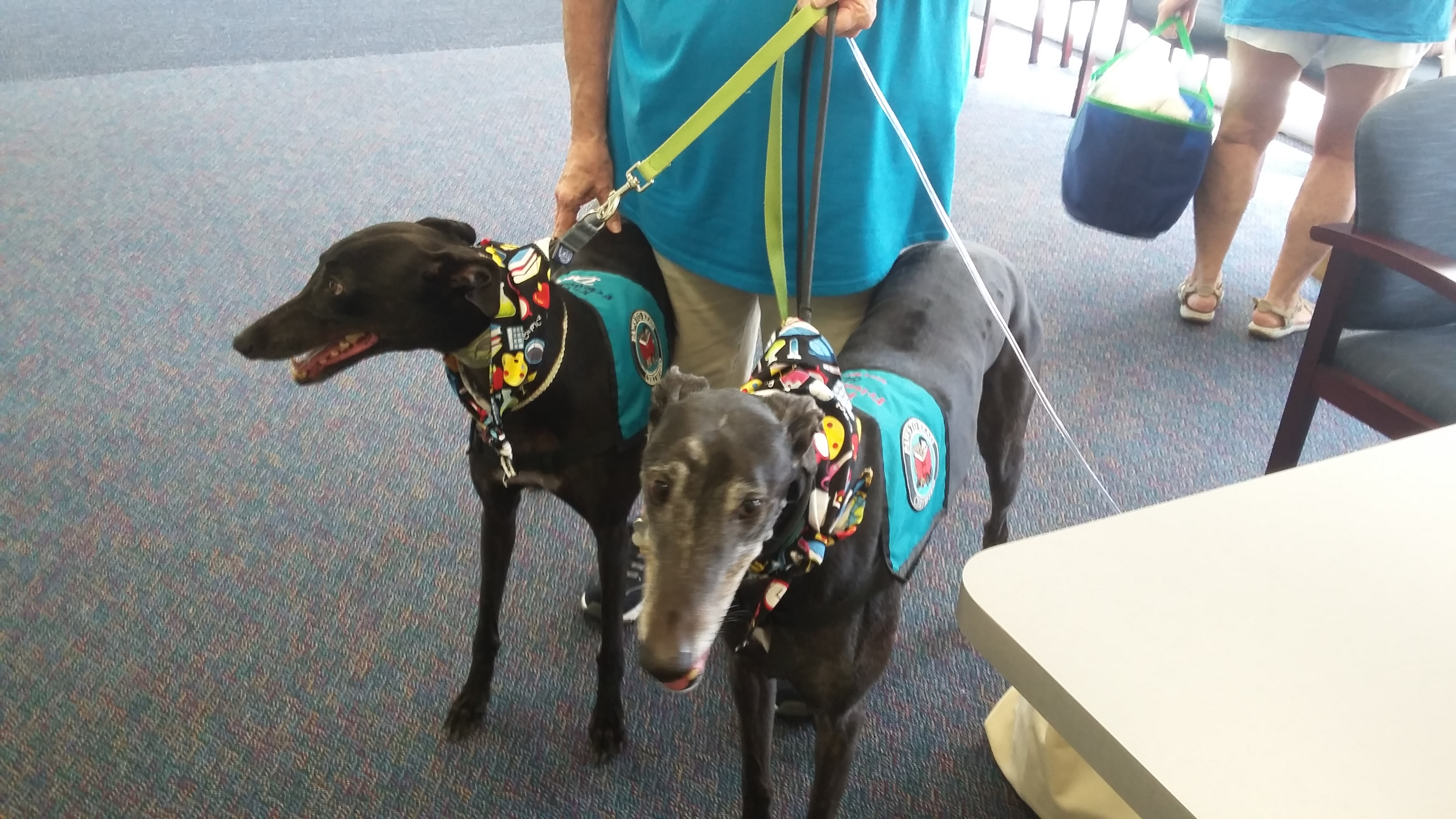
Greyhound therapy dogs in an elementary school in North Port, Florida

The University of Connecticut uses therapy dogs in their program Paws to Relax, available during finals week to help students deal with increased anxiety. The school uses them in other stressful situations, including suicides and deadly automobile accidents. Since 2011, Yale Law School has used therapy dogs to aid students experiencing stress. Some colleges and universities in the US bring therapy dogs to campus to help students de-stress. These campus events are often referred to as "Therapy Fluffies", a term coined by Torrey Trust, the original founder of the University of California San Diego therapy dog de-stress event. In 2009, Sharon Franks shared the idea of bringing therapy dogs to campus with the UC San Diego Office of Student Wellness.

Since the autumn of 2010, "Therapy Fluffies" has visited the UC Davis, UC Santa Cruz, and UC Riverside campuses during the week before mid-term and final exams. These events give students and staff the opportunity to pet and relax with therapy-certified dogs. The university also works with the Inland Empire Pet Partners, a service of the Humane Society to bring therapy-certified dogs to the campus' Mental Health Day Spa, held quarterly.

In 2014, Concordia University, Wisconsin became the first university in the US to adopt a full-time therapy dog to its campus in Mequon, Wisconsin. The golden retriever, Zoey, is a Lutheran church Charities K-9 Comfort Dog, trained to interact with people at churches, schools, nursing homes, hospitals, events, and in disaster response situations. Concordia later purchased a second comfort dog, named Sage.

==== Stressful situations ====
Therapy dogs were used to offer comfort to faculty, staff and students following the 2007 Virginia Tech shooting in Blacksburg, Virginia, when 32 people were killed. On December 14, 2012, therapy dogs were brought to the Sandy Hook Elementary School in Newtown, Connecticut, following the shooting and deaths of 26 people, providing comfort to children and parents.

The court system in King County, Washington uses a comfort dog with crime victims, particularly traumatized minors.

In Uganda, The Comfort Dog Project pairs dogs with those traumatized by war. Participants learn how to care for and train the animals as the dogs assist with confidence, help with depression and assist with recovery from post traumatic stress disorder.

=== Cognitive ===
Programs such as the Reading Education Assistance Dogs (R.E.A.D.) program promote literacy and communication skills; the practice uses therapy dogs to encourage children to read aloud by giving them a nonjudgmental listener. It has been proven that the academic performance and children's enthusiasm for reading has increased by having a therapeutic dog with them, especially in children with special education. Goals of canine-assisted reading programs include increasing reading fluency, increasing motivation to read, providing encouragement for reluctant readers, and making reading fun.

These cognitive benefits can be seen in libraries as well as schools. Internationally, there are programs that use therapy dogs in educational settings such as Germany, Argentina, Finland (Lukukoira Sylvi from Kuopio, Finland was the first animal nominated for Citizen of the Year), and Croatia, for example.

An article published by the American Journal of Alzheimer's Disease & Other Dementias reported that during visits with dogs, residents with dementia were able to be involved in special activities and were more verbal than usual. Researchers have identified further cognitive benefits of therapy dogs, which include an increase in mental stimulation and assistance in the recall of memories and the sequence of events.

=== Physical ===
Interaction with therapy dogs improves cardiovascular health, and as a result patients may need less medication. Personal pet visitation and animal-assisted interventions (AAIs) can benefit patients' pain, blood pressure, stress, depression, and anxiety, as well as increasing mobility and socialization with staff and families. Further, petting animals promotes the release of hormones that can elevate moods, specifically serotonin, prolactin and oxytocin. Patients receiving occupational therapy have improved their fine motor skills by grooming therapy dogs. Studies have found decreased cortisol levels in children with insecure attachment styles, children with autistic spectrum disorder, in hospital patients with heart failure, and in healthcare professionals, after physical contact with a dog.

=== Social ===
Therapy dogs promote greater self-esteem in students and encourage positive interactions with peers and teachers. Additionally, children with autism demonstrated increased verbal abilities and social interaction during therapy sessions when animals were present compared to traditional therapy sessions without them.

== Concerns ==
There are some concerns with using therapy dogs with children and adults in various public facilities. Some include hygiene, allergies, cross-cultural expectations, safety of participants, animal welfare, and lack of consistent training or certification process and liability. AAI (animal-assisted interventions) and AAA (animal-assisted activities) are facilitated by human/dog teams with extensive therapy dog training and have obtained behavioral and health evaluations. They follow guidelines for cleanliness (bathing and brushing dogs before sessions, keeping vaccinations up to date, trimming nails, human hand washing before and after visits) to alleviate most hygiene concerns. In all of these locations, patrons, students or patients are often required to take responsibility for their interactions with dogs in the form of a liability release or parental permission form. Advance considerations of the responsibilities of handlers and the institution or organization include insurance and background checks to address liability. Insurance claims against trained dog teams are rare, however, costs can be high if specialist insurance is not in place. Since therapy dog interaction is an optional activity, those with allergies, those who develop anxiety when near dogs, or those with general opposition to the program need not participate.

While there is no nationwide standard for certification or registration of ESAs, many online agencies claim to "register" an animal as an ESA for a fee. The qualifications are not strict which may raise concern. There have been countless incidents of people misusing confusing restrictions, given the sometimes overlapping terminology and recent emergence of service dogs and ESAs. To combat the issue of fraud, numerous states are enacting new regulations, the majority of which are centered on service animals. Some states have more specific laws that focus on exact situations, while other's are more general.

== See also ==
- Animal-assisted therapy
- Postponement of affect
- Service animal
  - Service dog
  - Therapy cat
- School dog
