= Cell dog =

Dog housed with a prisoner

A cell dog is a rescue dog that is being housed with a prison inmate, with the goal of improving the lives of both. These dogs are placed through a collaboration between the prison and an animal shelter. The inmates attempt to make the dog "adoptable" through obedience training, learning the skills of dog-training in the process. Additionally, both dog and inmate gain companionship and socialization they might not otherwise enjoy due to their circumstances, forming a kind of animal-assisted therapy for the inmates through human–canine bonding.
