= School dog =

Use of dogs in educational settings to support wellbeing and learning

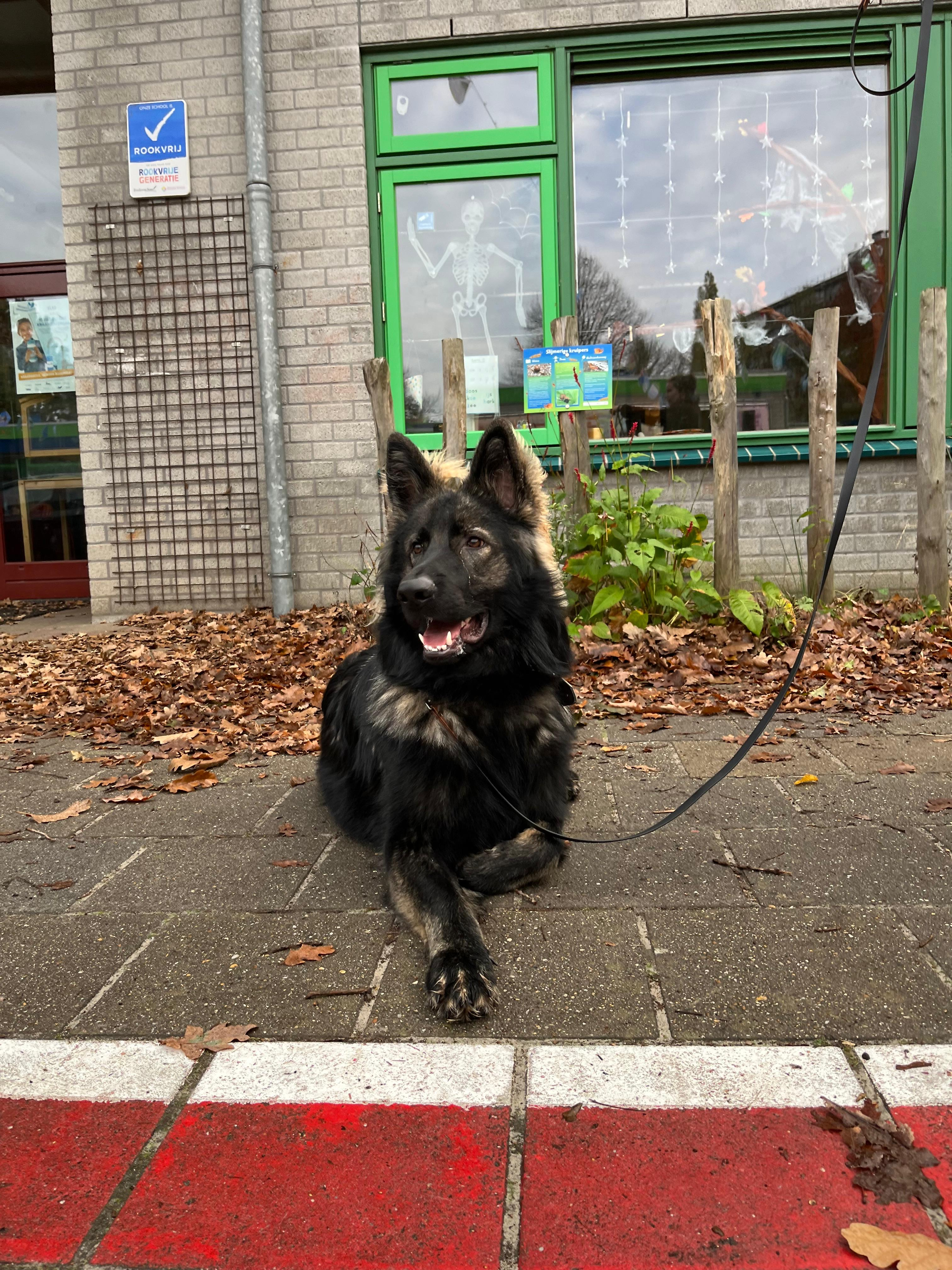
School dog

School dogs are specially trained or selected canines integrated into educational environments to support student wellbeing, engagement, and learning outcomes. These dogs may fulfill roles ranging from reading companions to therapeutic support animals and are increasingly present in primary and secondary schools worldwide.

School dogs are often described as having a naturally calming effect in classrooms. Because dogs are sensitive to human energy and emotion, their presence can help de-escalate tension, promote a quieter atmosphere, and support group relaxation. As such, they are also used as a tool for classroom regulation and emotional co-regulation.

== Overview ==
School dogs are typically part of broader animal-assisted interventions (AAIs), including animal-assisted therapy (AAT) and animal-assisted education (AAE). These programs leverage the human–animal bond to enhance psychological, social, and academic outcomes in children, particularly those with special educational needs.

School dogs can be therapeutic dogs but do not have to be certified as therapy dogs. There are specific training programs for school dogs. Some school dogs are trained and certified; however, there are also schools that work with dogs that are not certified.

== Research ==
Research on the role and impact of school dogs in educational settings is a developing field. Studies have explored various outcomes, including emotional, social, and academic dimensions. One particularly promising area of research is reading development. Several studies suggest that children's reading skills may improve when they have the opportunity to read aloud to a dog. This effect may be linked to the dog's non-judgemental presence, which can reduce performance anxiety and create a more relaxed environment for practicing reading skills. Additionally, children are typically free to decide whether or not to engage with the dog, allowing them to approach interactions at their own pace and comfort level.

=== Emotional and behavioral support ===
In addition to clinical studies, teacher-practitioner reports also describe positive outcomes from school dog programs. Teachers observed that a full-time comfort dog helped students with emotional regulation, particularly during moments of stress or conflict. Students also displayed improved social behaviors and increased engagement with peers. Moreover, the dog's presence contributed to a more inclusive and connected school climate, supporting relationships across students, staff, and families.

Recent research using randomized controlled trials has shown that dog-assisted interventions can effectively reduce physiological stress levels in schoolchildren. A 2022 study conducted by Meints et al. found that children who participated in dog-assisted sessions twice a week over four weeks showed significantly lower salivary cortisol levels compared to peers in relaxation or no-treatment groups. This stress-reducing effect was observed in both typically developing children and those with special educational needs. Importantly, the children who interacted with dogs maintained steady cortisol levels across the school term, while those in the control groups experienced an increase in stress hormones Children with autism spectrum disorder (ASD) and Down syndrome (DS) often experience heightened stress and social challenges. In dog-assisted therapy (DAT), children interacting with therapy dogs show reduced physiological stress during sessions, such as lower salivary cortisol and stabilized heart rate variability (HRV). A study involving children with ASD or DS showed cortisol decreased significantly within single sessions, indicating a stress-relieving effect.

A 2025 randomized controlled trial compared children receiving DAT with those in robot-dog and no-treatment control groups. The DAT group showed significantly greater improvements in emotional attunement and emotion regulation compared to controls.

=== Academic support ===
Reading dog programs are used to support literacy, especially in children with learning difficulties. In one six-week program for children aged 8–12 in special education, those who read aloud to a dog showed significantly greater gains in standardized reading test scores and demonstrated longer on-task behavior and more positive emotional expressions during reading sessions.

== Ethical guidelines and terminology in animal-assisted education ==
The International Association of Human-Animal Interaction Organizations (IAHAIO) has developed globally recognized definitions and guidelines to ensure ethical and effective implementation of animal-assisted interventions (AAI), including animal-assisted education (AAE). AAE refers to structured and goal-oriented educational activities led by trained professionals in which animals like school dogs are involved to promote academic, social, and emotional development. IAHAIO also emphasizes the importance of animal welfare and provides detailed guidance on training, species selection, and the ethical treatment of participating animals, underscoring that the animals are not tools but sentient participants deserving of respectful care.

== Dog welfare ==
The welfare of dogs participating in school-based animal-assisted interventions has become a growing focus in recent research. A 2024 systematic review by De Winkel and colleagues examined 33 studies on the impact of educational and therapeutic programs on dogs. Most studies reported neutral to mildly positive outcomes, such as stable cortisol levels and calm behavioral responses during sessions. However, the review also pointed out that much of the existing research lacks consistent methods, control groups, or long-term data.

Potential welfare concerns identified in the review include overworking the dogs, inconsistent communication between handlers and dogs, and the unpredictability of children's behavior. The review emphasized that factors such as the number of children involved, session length, and handler experience can significantly influence the dog's well-being. The authors recommended that future research should adopt standardized assessment protocols that include both physiological and behavioral measures to better evaluate the dog's emotional state.

A 2020 study on 19 therapy dogs assessed heart rate, HRV, salivary cortisol and oxytocin, and tympanic temperature before and after animal-assisted activities (AAAs). The dogs showed no signs of distress; in fact, post-session heart rate and ear temperatures were slightly lower, suggesting possible relaxation.

Best-practice guidelines from the International Association of Human–Animal Interaction Organizations (IAHAIO), Pet Partners, and the American Veterinary Medical Association emphasize that dogs should not only be free from stress but should positively enjoy their participation in school environments.

Recent scholarship has emphasized the importance of critically assessing the welfare of school dogs beyond anecdotal impressions. A 2023 pilot study by Pedersen and Malm developed a cross-disciplinary method combining ethology and ethnography to evaluate dog well-being during canine-assisted pedagogical sessions. Using tools like Qualitative Behavior Assessment (QBA), ethograms, and field observations across five schools in Sweden, the researchers documented both dog behavior and the social context of interactions. Findings suggested that while handlers often perceive dogs as enjoying their school roles, observable stress signals (e.g., avoidance behavior, low sociability scores) occasionally contradicted those assumptions. The authors argue for more structured and synchronized assessment methods to reliably understand the dog's lived experience and caution against anthropocentric interpretations of enthusiasm or consent.

== Training and certification ==
Ideal school dogs are calm, sociable, non-reactive to noise, and enjoy human interaction. Handlers typically receive training on dog behavior, infection control, and ethical guidelines. Sessions are often structured around established protocols and conducted under adult supervision or by trained educators or therapists.

== Limitations and future directions ==
While findings are encouraging, more large-scale, longitudinal studies are needed. Gaps remain in understanding the long-term effects of school dogs on children's outcomes and canine well-being, as well as best practices for integrating such programs sustainably in school curricula.

== See also ==
- Therapy dog
- Animal-assisted therapy
- Emotional support animal
- Special education
