= Thunder and Bolt =

Therapy pigs

Thunder and Bolt (born March 2, 2017) are a pair of miniature pigs certified by the American Mini Pig Association as therapy animals owned and trained by then 10-year-old Claire Barrow.

Thunder and Bolt made their therapy animal debut at Tampa General Hospital when they were 10 months old, where they celebrated their first birthday with patients from adult rehabilitation and children's medical center patients. Thunder and Bolt are the first therapy pigs at the hospital, where Barrow is also their first youth volunteer.

The pigs, approximately 75 lbs as adults, are taken to various local nursing homes and hospitals to perform their therapy duties. They also made an appearance during a Tampa Bay Lightning hockey game.

The pigs have their own website and social media accounts on Facebook, Twitter and Instagram and YouTube channel, and have aired on WTSP 10's Great Day Tampa and Q105 and featured on People.

== See also ==
- List of individual pigs
