= Boris M. Levinson =

American psychologist

Boris Mayer Levinson
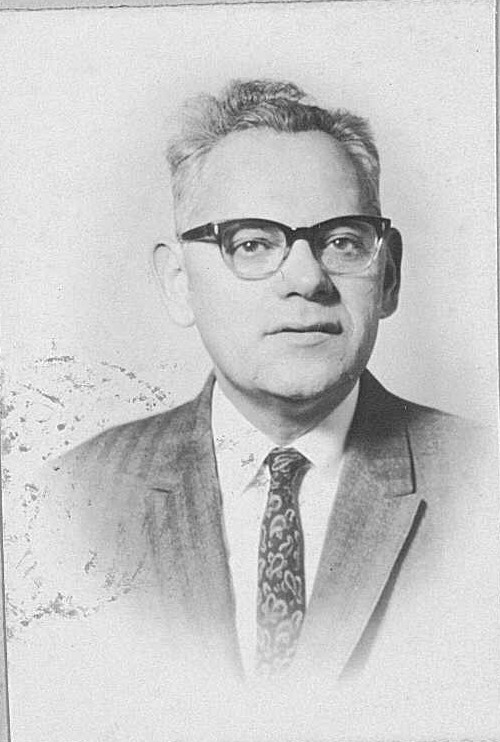
- Born: July 1, 1907; Kalvarija, Suwałki Governorate, Russian Empire (now Lithuania)
- Died: April 2, 1984 (aged 76); Brooklyn, New York City
- Education: New York University (PhD, 1947)
- Spouse(s): Ruth Berkowitz (m. 1934, div. 1974); Aida Peñaranda (m. 1977, until his death)
- Children: 2

Boris Mayer Levinson (July 1, 1907 – April 2, 1984) was an American psychologist who accidentally discovered the therapeutic benefits of animal-assisted therapy.

== Biography ==
=== Early life and education ===
Levinson was born to Jewish parents in the Lithuanian town of Kalvarija, Suwałki Governorate, then in the Russian partition of the Russian Empire. He was the third eldest of four siblings. When Levinson was 14, his family emigrated in 1923 to the United States to New York City. The Levinson family established themselves in Brooklyn, East New York. He graduated from Eastern District High School in Brooklyn and afterwards became a naturalized U.S. citizen in 1930.

=== Early career ===
Continuing with his studies, Levinson completed his Bachelor of Science at the City University of New York in 1937, and in 1938 he earned a Master of Science in Education. In 1947, he earned his PhD in clinical psychology from New York University. His dissertation, "A Comparative Study of Certain Homeless and Unattached Domiciled Men," lead him to become a pioneer in the study of homeless men; he wrote several articles about the topic. He also wrote about a variety of other topics, such as the psychological traits of children of traditional Jewish backgrounds, childhood autism, intellectual disability and animal assisted therapy.

=== Animal-assisted therapy ===
In 1953, while giving therapy to a withdrawn child Levinson observed that the child spoke and opened up to his dog Jingles. This led to the accidental discovery about the possible utilization of dogs in therapy. Initially, he dismissed the idea, but later, in 1961, wrote an article titled "The dog as a 'co-therapist'," which he later presented at a meeting of the American Psychological Association. Much of the audience responded to him with ridicule, while others accepted his ideas. Levinson's first article about the human-animal bond paved the way for later research in this field. He also coined the term "pet therapy" on his second article about the human-animal bond in 1964.

He continued to write more articles and books on the topic. Levinson is known as one of the fathers of the field of animal-assisted therapy.

=== Jewish studies ===
Having been born to Jewish parents and having spent most of his life in Brooklyn, New York, Levinson wrote a significant number of papers featuring Jewish subjects. Notably, Levinson conducted numerous studies on the intelligence of Jewish children and adolescents. Especially considering the Jewish population, he held in high regard scientific integrity. This is clearly evident in a scathing metatextual critique Levinson wrote in 1980.

== Personal life ==
In 1934, Levinson married his first wife, Ruth Berkowitz, and they had two sons. They later divorced and Levinson married for the second time to Aida Peñaranda, a diplomat from Bolivia, in 1974.

== Death ==
Levinson died of a heart attack in 1984. He was the director of human animal companion therapy at the Blueberry Center and was professor emeritus of psychology of Yeshiva University.
