= Doodle (disambiguation) =

A doodle is a relatively simple drawing made while a person's attention is otherwise occupied.

Doodle or Doodles may also refer to:

== Arts and entertainment ==
- "The Doodle", an episode of the TV series Seinfeld
- Doodle, a virtual pet in the video game Toontown Online
- Doodles (clown), the stage name for the British circus clown William Patrick McAllister (1877-1949)
- Doodles (comics), a children's activity panel/comic strip featuring Professor Doodles
- Doodles (Tweenies), a pet dog on the British children's programme Tweenies
- Doodles, the animated residents of Cool World, a 1992 Ralph Bakshi film
- Doodle, a 1976 video game for the Fairchild Channel F included in Videocart-1

== People ==
- A. L. "Doodle" Owens (1930–1999), American country music songwriter and singer
- Doodles Weaver (1911–1983), American actor, comedian and musician

== Other uses ==
- Doodle (dog), a hybrid of a poodle and other dog breeds
- Doodles, the former mascot of Chick-fil-A, replaced in 1997
- Doodle (website), a calendar tool for time management
- Google Doodle, a temporary alteration of the Google logo

== See also ==
- GlobalDoodle, a defunct website for collaborative real-time drawing
- Doodler, unidentified serial killer
- Doodletown, New York, a ghost town in Bear Mountain State Park
- "Yankee Doodle", a song
- Graffiti
