= Support Dogs, Inc. =

US non-profit organization

- Type: 501(c)(3)
- Tax ID no.: 43-1379801
- Location: St. Louis, Missouri
- Products: Service dogs
- Revenue: $1,433,617 (2015)
- Expenses: $839,352 (2015)
- Endowment: $4,682,915
- Website: www.supportdogs.org

Support Dogs, Inc. is a 501(c)(3) non-profit agency that provides assistance dogs to people with physical disabilities, and hearing dogs to those who are deaf or hard of hearing. It was founded in Columbus, Ohio, in 1981 by Sandy Maze, and is now based in St. Louis, Missouri.

== Overview ==
Service dogs are trained to perform tasks their owners cannot, such as retrieve dropped and distant objects, open doors, pull wheelchairs, and help the client get undressed.

In addition, the dogs provide companionship and support. The dogs are trained by volunteers, including highly screened female prisoners in an Illinois maximum security prison.

== Embezzlement victim ==
In 2005, Support Dogs discovered it had been a victim of embezzlement when ex-director Robert Hansen was accused of stealing over $400,000 from the organization over a period of five years. On September 9, 2005, Robert Hansen was convicted and sentenced to 24 months in prison and 36 months on supervised release.

== See also ==
- Hearing Dogs for Deaf People
- Canine Companions for Independence
- Can Do Canines
