= Animal-assisted therapy =

Alternative or complementary type of therapy

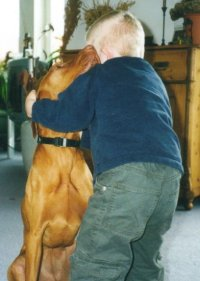
Dogs are common in animal-assisted therapy.

Animal-assisted therapy (AAT) is an alternative or complementary type of therapy that includes the use of animals in a treatment. The goal of this animal-assisted intervention is to improve a patient's social, emotional, physical or cognitive functioning. Animal assisted therapy is used along side traditional therapy. Animal-assisted therapy can be used in many different facilities, like hospitals, prisons, and nursing homes, to aid in the therapy provided.

The specific animal-assisted therapy can be classified by the type of animal, the targeted population, and how the animal is incorporated into the therapeutic plan. Various animals have been utilized for animal-assisted therapy, with the most common types being canine-assisted therapy and equine-assisted therapy.

Use of these animals in therapies has shown positives results in many cases, such as post-traumatic stress disorder (PTSD), depression, anxiety, sexual abuse victims, dementia, and autism.

== Description ==
Animal-assisted therapy is an alternative or complementary type of therapy that includes the use of animals in a treatment. It falls under the realm of animal-assisted intervention, which encompasses any intervention in the studio that includes an animal in a therapeutic context such as emotional support animals, service animals trained to assist with daily activities, and animal-assisted activity.The goal of animal-assisted therapy is to improve a patient's social, emotional, or cognitive functioning.

Animal assist therapy is a very organized activity. Each session has specific goals and trained handlers are used, many different species can be utilized in animal assisted therapy. Despite overlap, it differs from animal-assisted education, whose focus is teaching and learning with the support of non-human animals.

Veterinarians must follow strict guidelines to keep humans and animals safe during this therapy. This consists of things such as animal wellness, behaviors and medical strategies. Alongside veterinarians a responsible person(RP) is needed to maintain animals health, behavior and welfare. The RP can be the animal's owner, handler or an authorized agent.

== History ==
In modern times animals are seen as "agents of socialization" and as providers of "social support and relaxation". The earliest reported use of the therapy for the mentally ill took place in the late 18th century at the York Retreat in England, led by William Tuke. Patients at this facility were allowed to wander the grounds which contained a population of small domestic animals. These were believed to be effective tools for socialization. In 1860, the Bethlem Hospital in England followed the same trend and added animals to the ward, greatly influencing the morale of the patients living there. Other literature refers to animal-assisted therapy being used as early as 1792 at the Quaker Society of Friends York Retreat in England. Velde, Cipriani & Fisher also state "Florence Nightingale appreciated the benefits of pets in the treatment of individuals with illness."

=== Examples of historical uses ===
The US military promoted the use of dogs as a therapeutic intervention with psychiatric patients in 1919 at St Elizabeth's Hospital in Washington, DC.

Sigmund Freud kept many dogs and often had his chow Jofi present during his pioneering sessions of psychoanalysis. He noticed that the presence of the dog was helpful because the patient would find that their speech would not shock or disturb the dog and this reassured them and so encouraged them to relax and confide. This was most effective when the patient was a child or adolescent. Increased recognition of the value of human–pet bonding was noted by Dr. Boris M. Levinson in 1961. Levinson accidentally used animals in therapy with children when he left his dog alone with a nonverbal child, and upon returning, found the child talking to the dog.

== Physiological effects ==
Edward O. Wilson's (1984) biophilia hypothesis is based on the premise that our attachment to and interest in animals stems from the strong possibility that human survival was partly dependent on signals from animals in the environment indicating safety or threat. The biophilia hypothesis suggests that if we see animals at rest or in a peaceful state, this may signal to us safety, security and feelings of well-being which in turn may trigger a state where personal change and healing are possible.

Six neurotransmitters that influence mood have been documented to release after a 15-minute or more interaction with animals. Mirror neuron activity and disease-perception through olfactory (smelling) ability in dogs may also play important roles in helping dogs connect with humans during therapeutic encounters.

Animal-assisted therapy has also been shown to have a positive impact on brain, neurochemical, and cardiovascular function. Interventions involving canines has been shown to decrease blood pressure, the stress hormones epinephrine and norepinephrine, and increase hormones associated with pleasure, like dopamine and oxytocin.

Studies have documented some positive effects of the therapy on subjective self-rating scales and on objective physiological measures such as blood pressure and hormone levels. Some studies have shown that animal-assisted therapy can improve many aspects of a patient's life, such as improving their overall mood or reducing feelings of isolation. Research has found that animals can have an overall positive effect on health and improve mood and quality of life. Studies have documented some positive effects of the therapy on subjective self-rating scales and on objective physiological measures such as blood pressure and hormone levels. The positive effect has been linked to the human-animal bond. In a variety of settings, such as prisons, nursing homes, and mental institutions, these animals are used to assist people with different disabilities or disorders.

== Medical uses ==
Animals can be integrated into settings such as prisons, nursing homes, mental institutions, and in the home. The techniques used depend on the needs and condition of the patient. Assistance dogs can support certain life activities and help people navigate outside the home.

Assessing whether a program is effective as far as its outcomes are concerned is easier when the goals are clear and are able to be specified. There are a range of goals for animal-assisted therapy programs relevant to children and young people, including enhanced capacity to form positive relationships with others. It is understood that pets provide benefits to those with mental health conditions, but further research is required to test the nature and extent of this relationship with an animal as a pet and how it differs between pets, emotional support animals, service animals, and animal-assisted therapy.

=== Cognitive rehabilitation treatment ===
Acquired brain injury survivors with cognitive impairments can benefit from animal-assisted therapy as part of a comprehensive rehabilitation treatment plan.

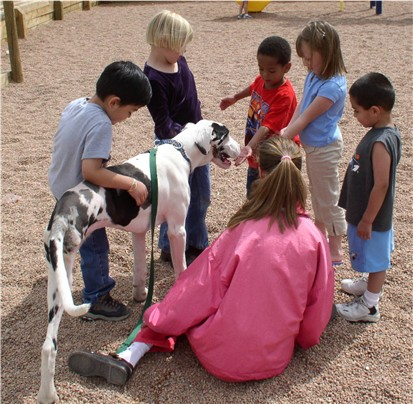
Pets may promote kindness in children.

=== Pediatric care ===
Animals can be used as a distraction method when it comes to various situations or pain, and animals can also help bring happiness, pleasure, and entertainment to the pediatric population. Animals can also help improve children's moods and reinforce positive behaviors while helping to decrease negative ones.

==== Behavioral health ====
Therapists rely on techniques such as monitoring a child's behavior with the animal, their tone of voice, and indirect interviewing. Animal-assisted therapy can be used in children with mental health problems, as a stand-alone treatment, or along with conventional methods.

==== Hospital setting ====
Animal-assisted therapy (AAT) is used in hospital settings with children to try to improve their overall well-being and mood during their stay. Most commonly reported research results are decreased anxiety and pain within the pediatric population. One area of pediatric hospital care in which the use of AAT has been studied is magnetic resonance imaging procedures which can trigger negative emotions in children, causing them to move and require procedural sedation. After AAT intervention, the anxiety levels of the subjects decreased significantly when compared to controls. Dogs have been shown to increase comfort and decrease pain in pediatric palliative care. Specific tactics have not been researched, but collective reviews of varied techniques displayed similar results of increased comfort reports by children and guardians. Though meta-analysis has determined that children receiving AAT have seen a reduction in pain when compared to control groups, further quantitative research is needed to confirm this conclusion.

==== Potential risks ====
Though AAT has existed and been in practice for decades, the lack of standardization creates potential risks for both the animals and humans involved. As the use among pediatric populations continues to climb, another concern that has been raised about the use of animals in a hospital setting is the spread of germs. Many children in hospital settings have weakened immune systems and are already at risk of contracting hospital-borne infections. It has been found that both the patients and dogs participating in therapy experienced changes to their biome after their sessions. Whether these changes pose a long-term benefit or risk has yet to be proven, and more in-depth studies are needed to make this determination. Additionally researchers are working to find an accurate way to determine the effects of AAT on both the service animal and the human participating in therapy.

=== Prisons ===
Animal-assistance programs, such as cell dog programs, may be useful in prisons to relieve stress of the inmates and workers, or to provide other benefits, but further study is needed to confirm the effectiveness of such programs in these settings. Internal file data reviews, anecdotal stories, and surveys of inmate and staff perceptions have been used to gauge the effectiveness of animal-assisted therapy in prisons, but these methods are limited and have resulted in an inadequate assessment.

Researchers have, however, begun to find methods of gauging the effectiveness of prison animal programs (PAPs) by using Propensity Score Watching. One study using this method found that PAPs positively impact reductions in severe or violent infractions. A reduction in offenses statistically may reduce recidivism rates and increase former inmate job marketability and societal reintegration.

Training and being responsible for an animal can foster empathy, emotional intelligence, communication, and self-control in inmates; however, the results of studies done so far must be taken with caution as the methodological quality of existing studies is limited. PAPs also benefit the animals involved as many come from situations where they faced abuse, neglect or potential euthanasia.

=== Nursing homes ===
The findings offer proof of the concept that canine-assisted therapies are feasible and can elicit positive quality-of-life experiences in institutionalized people with dementia. Researchers and practitioners need to elucidate the theoretical foundations of animal-assisted therapies. The Lived Environment Life Quality Model may serve as a guide for client-centered, occupation-focused, and ecologically valid approaches to animal-assisted occupational therapy beyond people with dementia.

When elderly people are transferred to nursing homes or long-term care facilities, they often become passive, agitated, withdrawn, depressed, and inactive because of the lack of regular visitors or the loss of loved ones. Supporters of animal-assisted therapy say that animals can be helpful in motivating the patients to be active mentally and physically, keeping their minds sharp and bodies healthy. A significant difference has been seen among verbal interactions among nursing home residents with a dog present. Therapists or visitors who bring animals into their sessions at the nursing home are often viewed as less threatening, which increases the relationship between the therapist or visitor and patient.

=== Occupational therapy ===
Occupational therapists can use animal-assisted therapies to work on the child's motivation. Some occupational therapy goals using animal-assisted therapies include improving attention skills, social skills, participation in play, self-esteem, and reducing anxiety, loneliness, and isolation.

== Types ==
Various animal species are used in animal-assisted therapy. Individual animals are evaluated with strict criteria before being used. The criteria include appropriate size, age, aptitude, typical behaviors and the correct level of training. The most commonly used species are dogs and horses. Research has been published on dolphin therapy.

=== Canine-assisted therapy ===
In canine-assisted therapy, therapy dogs interact with patients in animal assisted interventions, to enhance therapeutic activities and well-being including the physical, cognitive, behavioral and socio-emotional functioning of clients. Well-trained therapy dogs exhibit the behavior that human patients construe as friendly and welcoming. They comfort patients via body contact. Therapy dogs are also required to possess a calm temperament for accommodating the contact with unfamiliar clients while they serve as a source of comfort. They promote patients engaging in interactions which can help patient improve motor skills and establish trusting relationship with others. The interaction between patients and therapy dogs also aids reducing stressful and anxious feelings patients have. Due to those benefits, canine-assisted therapy is used as a complement to other therapies to treat diagnosis such as post-traumatic stress disorder, attention deficit hyperactivity disorder, autism spectrum disorder, and dementia.

Canine assistance can also be used in classroom for promoting the development of creative writing and living skills and the participation of children in group activities. There are programs called canine-assisted reading programs which facilitate children with special educational needs. These programs utilize the calm, non-judgmental, happy characteristics of canines to let the process of reading become more meaningful and enjoyable for children. With these benefits, researchers suggest incorporating dogs into assisting learning and educational programs.

=== Dolphin therapy ===
Dolphin-assisted therapy refers to the controversial alternative medicine practice of swimming with dolphins. This form of therapy has been strongly criticized as having no long-term benefit, and being based on flawed observations. Psychologists have cautioned that dolphin-assisted therapy is not known to be effective for any condition and that it presents considerable risks to both human patients and the captive dolphins. The child has a one-on-one session with a therapist in a marine park. An ethical issue with data on dolphin-assisted therapy and the effectiveness of it is that most of the research is done by people who operate the dolphin-assisted therapy programs.

=== Equine-related therapy ===
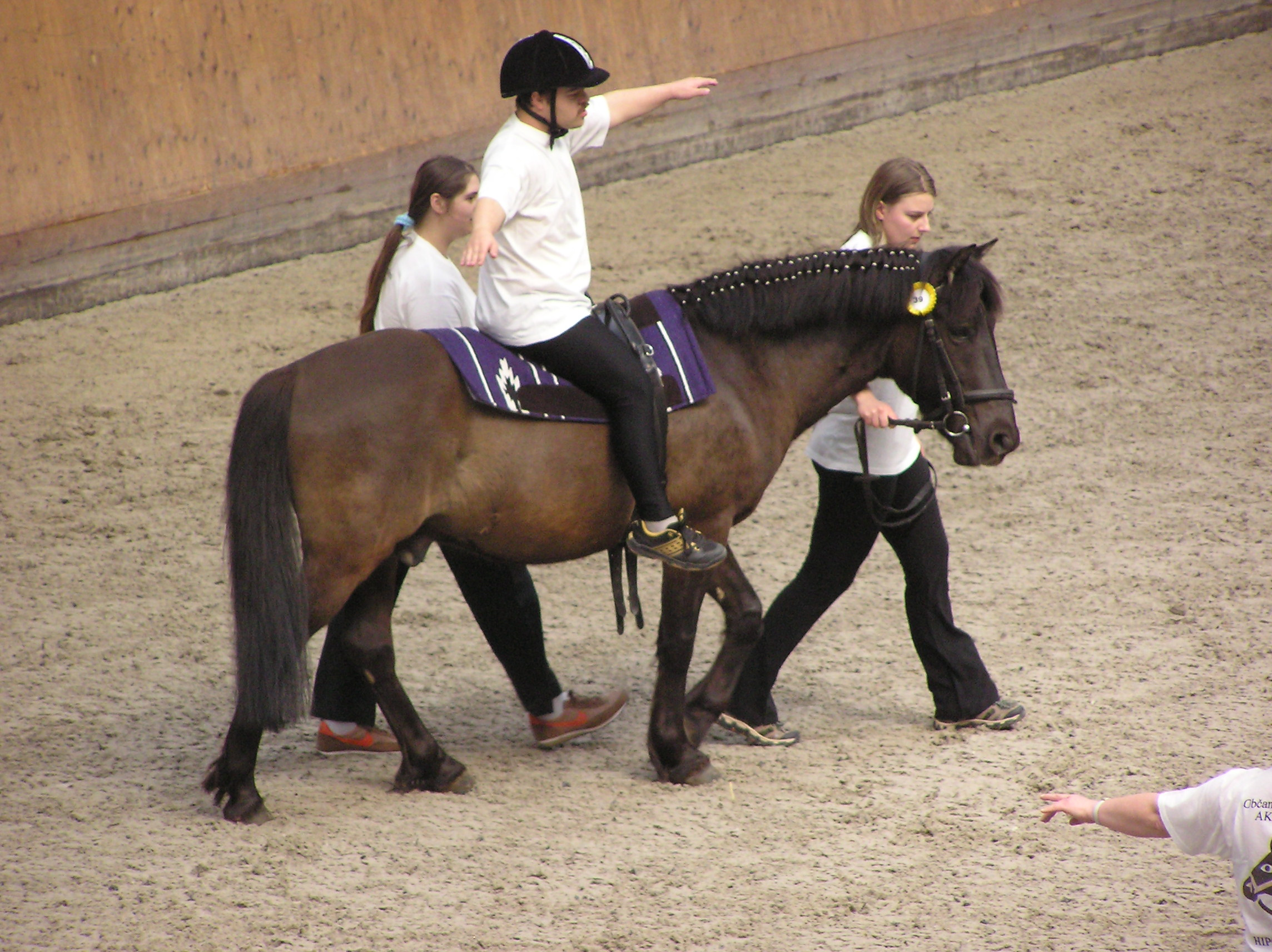
Hippotherapy is promoted as a treatment for people with physical or mental challenges.

Equine-assisted therapy encompasses a range of treatments that involve activities with horses and other equines to promote human physical and mental health.

Therapeutic riding is used by disabled individuals who ride horses to relax, and to develop muscle tone, coordination, confidence, and well-being. Equine-assisted psychotherapy (EAP) or Equine Facilitated Psychotherapy (EFP) is the use of equines to treat human psychological problems in and around an equestrian facility. The existing body of evidence does not justify the promotion and use of equine-related treatments for mental disorders.

=== Pig therapy ===
Pigs have been used in various types of animal-assisted therapy to perform duties in facilities including airports, hospitals, nursing homes, and special-needs schools, or as emotional support animals for individuals with conditions such as autism or anxiety and veterans with PTSD. Two well-known miniature pigs named Thunder and Bolt trained by children to certified animal therapy status have been put to work in a number of nursing homes, schools and a hospital.

=== Therapy with other animals ===
Llamas are also used in therapy.

For patients that have allergies to animals that have fur, snakes have been used to provide emotional support.

== Effectiveness ==
Based on current research, there are many conditions that can benefit from animal-assisted therapy in diverse settings around the world. Those conditions include psychological disorder, developmental disorder, dementia, chronic pain, advanced heart failure, etc. Animal-assisted therapy is commonly used for psychological disorders. Attention deficit hyperactivity disorder, autism spectrum disorder, post-traumatic stress disorder, and major depressive disorder are among the psychological disorders that can benefit from animal-assisted therapy.

In recent decades, an increased amount of research indicates the social, psychological, and physiological benefits of animal-assisted therapy in the fields of health and education. Although the effectiveness of animal-assisted therapy is still unclear due to the lack of clarity regarding the degree to which the animal itself contributes in the recovery process, there is a growing awareness that the therapy may be effective in treating attention deficit hyperactivity disorder, post-traumatic stress disorder, autism spectrum disorder, and dementia.

In addition to its typical application in clinical disorders, recent research has focused on studying animal-assisted therapy in broader populations. A 2025 meta-analysis of randomized controlled trials determined that interactions with therapy dogs were associated with notable reductions in anxiety and stress levels among college students. The most significant improvements were reported by students who began with higher stress levels, indicating that these interventions could be specifically useful for individuals experiencing elevated psychological strain. Similar results have been observed in other contexts, including among otherwise healthy healthcare workers participating in animal-assisted programs. While additional research is necessary, current outcomes suggest that animal-assisted therapy could provide a viable option for reducing anxiety and stress and supporting the emotional health of young adult populations.

== Populations and settings ==
=== Children and adolescents in inpatient settings ===
Research on animal-assisted therapy within inpatient and psychiatric health settings has shown potential benefits for youth. A recent systematic review of animal-assisted therapy for adolescents and children found enhanced social behavior, improved mood, and reduced anxiety levels after structured interactions with therapy dogs. Participants demonstrated greater willingness to take part in therapeutic activities and showed more consistent emotional responsiveness during treatment. These findings suggested that animal-assisted therapy might support the therapeutic processes in inpatient environments by encouraging participation and lowering emotional distress. The review noted that, despite the outcomes reflecting significant improvements, the applicability of findings might be limited by small sample sizes and variability in intervention structure across studies.

The feasibility of integrating therapy dogs into inpatient treatment for children has recently been examined. This study involved children with acquired brain injury and their families and aimed to determine whether the presence of therapy dogs would be accepted in an inpatient rehabilitation setting. The outcome suggested that the integration of therapy dogs was positively accepted by the patients, their families, and the clinical staff, and the dogs did not interfere with standard rehabilitation practices. The patients reported increased enjoyment and motivation during treatment, which supports genuine engagement within inpatient settings. These findings complement earlier studies indicating that therapy dogs can support social interaction, emotional regulation, and participation among children and adolescents receiving mental healthcare in inpatient settings. The culmination of this research specifies the potential for animal-assisted therapy to positively impact rehabilitative and psychological outcomes for children in multiple inpatient care contexts.

=== Oncology and palliative care ===
Animal-assisted therapy (AAT) is also used in the oncology and the palliative care settings to support patients coping with cancer and advanced illnesses. Some systematic reviews have reported improvements in patients emotional well-being, including reductions in anxiety and distress, after they interact with the therapy animals during treatment or hospitalization. Animal-assisted interventions (AAI) in palliative care may help lessen the feelings of loneliness, promote comfort, and encourage crucial social interaction with family and/or friends for patients who are facing the common physical and emotional burdens that come along with cancer care.

Research also notes a decrease in pain and physiological stress responses, like lower blood pressure in some patient groups, which could contribute to an increased feeling of relaxation during medical procedures. Using these findings, we can see that animal-assisted therapy is able to positively complement medical and psychosocial care by providing the emotional support patients need as well as improve their comfortability in and out of the clinical settings.

=== Attention deficit hyperactivity disorder ===
Children with attention deficit hyperactivity disorder (ADHD) may decrease behavioral issues and improve socialization skills with the intervention of animal-assisted therapy. Compared to children who received only cognitive-behavioral therapy, children who received both canine-assisted therapy and cognitive-behavioral therapy had reduced severity of ADHD symptoms. However, the dog-assisted therapy did not relieve symptoms in long-term treatment.

=== Post-traumatic stress disorder ===
Post-traumatic stress disorder (PTSD) is a psychological disorder affects people's mental health and has varying severity and forms. It is often difficult to treat due to high drop-out rates and low responses to traditional psycho-therapeutic approaches and interventions.

Animals have both direct and indirect effects on a mental health spectrum including biological, psychological, and social responses, further targeting marked symptoms of post-traumatic stress disorder (i.e., re-experiencing, avoidance, changes in beliefs/feelings, and hyperarousal). Direct effects of animals include a decrease in anxiety and blood pressure while indirect effects result in increased social interactions and overall participation in everyday activities.

Biologically, specific chemicals are released when observing human and animal interactions. Similarly, dog assistance can potentially mediate oxytocin which effects social and physical well-being and decrease blood pressure. The psychological benefits of animals focus mainly on dog and human interactions, the reduction of anxiety and depressive symptoms, and increased resilience. Animals in this capacity can further provide emotional and psychological assistance and support, addressing several of the disorder's symptoms. The presence of an animal can alleviate intrusion symptoms by providing a reminder that there is no danger present. Animals can further elicit positive emotions, targeting emotional numbing experiences. Animal interactions also provide social benefits, providing companionship and alleviate feelings of loneliness and isolation through everyday routines and increased social interactions in public.

The incorporation and involvement of animals dates back to the earliest forms of organized combat. Dogs, in particular, were utilized in different capacities. Ancient armies employed dogs as soldiers and companions which extended to modern combat including dogs as a crucial asset in communication, detection, and intimidation. While a range of animals can be utilized, dogs and horses have been the principal species studied in practice. Dog-assisted therapy and therapeutic horseback riding are non-invasive methods for treating post-traumatic stress disorder in veterans.

Canines can easily integrate into a multitude of environments, are highly responsive to humans, and are very intelligent. For those reasons, dogs are the species most commonly used in interventions. Dogs are typically categorized according to the level of training received and the specific needs of the individual. A service dog provides relief through specialized support related to a physical, mental, or psychological disability. Emotional support animals solely provide psychological relief and do not require specialized training. Therapy animals often provide additional support in a therapeutic environment by supporting counselors or therapists in their therapeutic duties. While service dogs, emotional support animals, and therapy dogs can support the diverse symptoms that veterans, specifically bred and selected post-traumatic stress disorder service dogs, are trained and assigned to veterans with the disorder to support with daily life activities as well as with emotional and mental health needs.

Dogs provide subjective positive effects to veterans and serve as a compassionate reminder to veterans with post-traumatic stress disorder that danger is not present, creating a safe space for the veteran. They are often sensitive to humans and have the ability to adapt their behavior accordingly by doing tasks such as preventing panic, waking a veteran from a nightmare, and nudging to help the veteran "stay in the present". Dogs provide veterans with a nonjudgmental and safe environment that can help a veteran express feelings and process thoughts without interruption, criticism or advice. Interactions, such as petting, playing and walking, with the dog can increase physical activity, reduce anxiety, and provide encouragement to stay in the present moment. The interaction between dog and veterans supports social interactions for isolated veterans, reduces symptoms associated with the disorder such as depression and anxiety, and increases veterans' calmness.

Similar to dogs, horses have been included in the treatment of veterans with post-traumatic stress disorder by providing an accepting and nonjudgmental environment, which further facilitates a veterans' ability to cope with symptoms. Because horses are social animals, they are capable of creating and responding to relationships based on the veteran's energy, providing an opportunity for veterans to regain the ability to form trusting relationships. Therapeutic work with horses varies from ground-based activities, mounted activities, or a combination of both. In the therapeutic context, horses can promote cognitive reframing as well as an increase in the use of mindfulness practice. While there is limited research and standardized instruments to measure the effects, veterans who have participated in pilot programs have better communication skills, self-awareness, and self-esteem, promoting safety and support during the transition into civilian life. Long-term effects of equine-based interventions with veterans include increased happiness, social support, and better sleep hygiene because they are able to process information regarding their emotions and behaviors in a nonjudgmental space.

While animal-assisted interventions may be effective, it is not yet verified due to limited research. Animal-assisted interventions can be challenging to study. Because of lack of effective resources, most studies are limited to small sample sizes which prevents generalizing results over a larger population. Furthermore, there is often a lack of randomization and a lack of information about sample representativeness that prevents widespread application. Hospital-based animal-assisted therapy programs may present a slight risk of pathogen transmission, but further research is needed.

Post-traumatic stress disorder in sexual assault survivors

The disorder can develop when a person experiences a sexual assault or rape. Sexual assault is the leading cause of post-traumatic stress disorder in women; an estimated 50% of women who were sexually assaulted develop the condition. Animal-assisted therapy can be an effective in treating the trauma for survivors of sexual assault. The presence of dogs have been shown to improve communication between the survivor and the therapist and to decrease survivors' anxiety and fear-responses. Animal-assisted therapy increases social interaction for those with the disorder. Studies show that animal-assisted therapy leads to an overall reduction of symptoms including anger, depression, and dissociation in survivors of sexual assault. Animal-assisted therapy has also been shown to reduce problem behavior and improves overall behavioral functioning for children survivors of sexual assault.

Further research is needed to show the effectiveness of animal-assisted interventions in treating post-traumatic stress disorder for sexual assault survivors across varying demographics. Limitations in current research include small sample sizes and reliance on anecdotal evidence.

=== Autism spectrum disorder ===
Animal-assisted therapy may reduce the symptoms of autism spectrum disorder such as aggressiveness, irritability, difficulty concentrating, and hyperactivity. In one review, five out of nine studies reviewed showed positive effects of therapeutic horseback riding on children with autism spectrum disorder. Canine-assisted intervention provides a calmer environment by reducing the stress, irritation, and anxiety that children with autism spectrum disorder experience. Playing with dogs increases positive mood in children with autism spectrum disorder. Animals also can serve as a social catalyst. In the presence of animals, children with autism spectrum disorder are more likely to engage in social interactions with humans. However, the impact of animal-assisted therapy upon parent–child interaction is not clear.

=== Dementia ===
Animal-assisted therapy encourages expressions of emotions and cognitive stimulation through discussions and reminiscing of memories while the patient bonds with the animal. Studies have found that animal-assisted therapies (particularly using dogs) resulted in measurable quality of life improvements for patients with dementia. Patients with dementia were also found to improve their social interactions and their scores on the Cohen-Mansfield Agitation Inventory. Animal-assisted therapy has been shown to slightly reduce depressive symptoms in people with dementia in a 2019 systematic review.

Another systematic review and meta-analysis related to animal-assisted therapy in older adults experiencing dementia and Alzheimer's disease was recently conducted. This analysis found that structured interactions with therapy animals were associated with improvements in mood, communication, and engagement during therapeutic practices. Participants displayed increased responsiveness and reduced emotional distress, which can support emotional stability and social interaction in this geriatric population. While these findings indicate positive benefits, the review noted that the outcomes might be limited by smaller sample sizes and variable intervention methods across studies.

== Proposed mechanisms ==
The benefits of animal-assisted therapy could be related to its ability to provide emotional support and reduce stress reactions. A systematic review of canine-assisted therapy for college students determined that the interactions with therapy dogs were associated with lower stress and anxiety levels. These interactions have been reported to help individuals feel more calm and supported, which could strengthen their ability and willingness to engage in therapeutic practices.

Equine-assisted therapies for people with autism spectrum disorder have also been connected to improvements in regulation of emotions and social communication, which suggests that structured interactions with animals can have positive impacts on behavioral control and social engagement. This research suggests that animal-assisted therapy can influence social and emotional functioning, which contributes to a greater sense of comfortability and deeper engagement during treatment.

== Limitations ==
There is limited scientific research on the use of the therapy among adults who have been sexually assaulted. While animals do tend to comfort survivors, animal therapy may not be the catalyst that provides positive success in therapy sessions. As mentioned above, adults tend not to focus as much on having an animal companion, and therefore, animal therapy cannot be attributed as the reason for success in those types of therapy sessions. There are some ethical concerns that arise when applying animal therapy to younger survivors of sexual assault. For example, if a child is introduced to an animal that is not their pet, the application of animal therapy can cause some concerns. First of all, some children may not be comfortable with animals or may be frightened which could be avoided by asking permission to use animals in therapy. Second, a special bond is created between animal and child during animal therapy. Therefore, if the animal in question does not belong to the child, there may be some negative side effects when the child discontinues therapy. The child will have become attached to the animal, which does raise some ethical issues as far as subjecting a child to the disappointment and possible relapse that can occur after therapy discontinues.

It is unclear to what degree the animal itself contributes in the recovery process.

There are some concerns specific to dolphin-assisted therapy: First, it is potentially hazardous to the human patients, and it is harmful to the dolphins themselves; by taking dolphins out of their natural environment and putting them in captivity for therapy can be hazardous to their well-being. Second, dolphin-assisted therapy has been strongly criticized as having no long-term benefit, and being based on flawed observations. Third, psychologists have cautioned that dolphin-assisted therapy is not effective for any known condition.

There are concerns that people may become dependent on the animal and could interfere with the recovery process for PTSD. People may feel as though they cannot do things on their own without the presence of the animal.

== Ethical concerns ==
Though AAT has existed and been in practice for decades, the lack of standardization creates potential risks for both the animals and humans involved. Due to the unclear structural guidelines on the use of animals in therapeutic settings, possible impacts to the animal include stress, injury, and health complications. Research has shown that despite quality guidelines in place to ensure the health of the therapy animal, there are reports of negative interactions between human participant and therapy dogs. These reports include mistreating and teasing the dogs by patients and staff at locations in which therapy is hosted. In studies conducted, people with certain disabilities had to be excluded from the experiment due to increase in the stress of the therapy dog, and ultimately decline in overall well-being. There is a question as to whether bringing animals into AAT settings where the client has a history of violence is ethical, or if the benefit outweighs the risk.

Equine-assisted therapy showed a need for more studies of equine behavior to obtain an understanding of stress signals from horses. Through understanding the stress signals shown by horses, a safe and healthy experience during the therapy session can be held, by allowing handlers to minimize stress. For therapy animals limited time for rest, multiple sessions, and long duration of sessions were linked to higher stress. Assessing animals for signs of fatigue and stress can prevent negative experience for both humans and animals involved. Animals used should be limited to a specific duration and number of sessions, as well as given access to proper environmental conditions, food, water, and rest.

Ethical analysis extends beyond stress during sessions to the broader commodification and breeding of animals for therapeutic roles. Critics point to practices like breeding dogs for specific "looks" conducive to therapy without regard for genetic health problems, or the early separation and intensive training of service dogs, as systemic issues that prioritize human utility over animal integrity.

== See also ==
- Animal cognition
- Animal consciousness
- Care farming
- Classroom pet
- Emotional support animal
- Human-canine bond
- Service animal
- Service dog
- Therapy cat
- Therapy dog
- School dog
