= Doddle Parcels =

UK logistics company

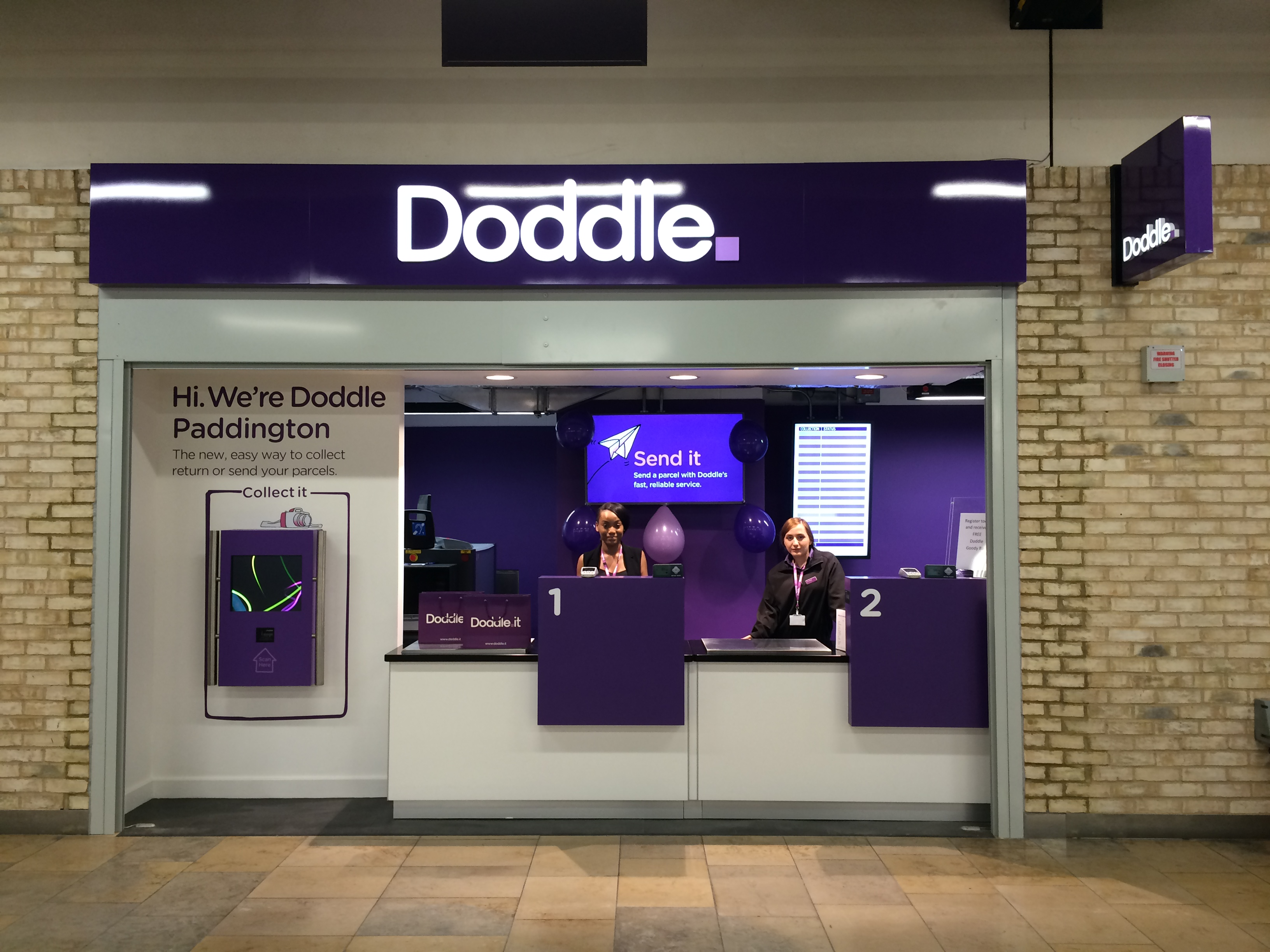
- Doddle Paddington, 2016
- Company type: Subsidiary
- Industry: Technology
- Founded: October 2014; 10 years ago in London, United Kingdom
- Founders: Tim Robinson; Lloyd Dorfman
- Defunct: October 2023
- Fate: Acquired by Blue Yonder
- Headquarters: London, United Kingdom
- Parent: Blue Yonder
- Website: doddle.com

Doddle (Doddle Parcel Services Ltd) is a technology company that enables retailers to offer click & collect, in-store returns and fulfilment from stores. It also has concessions within stores of Morrisons across the United Kingdom, where customers can collect online shopping or return products.

== History ==
Doddle was launched in October 2014 as a joint venture between Network Rail and the founder of Travelex, Lloyd Dorfman. Network Rail approached Glazer Business and Brand Consultants with the task of creating a brand identity for a new parcel pick-up service, primarily within railway stations. The brand identity was subsequently designed by Richard Lawton and Stuart Palmer of Glazer.

As of January 2020, Doddle no longer operates Doddle-branded Morrisons stores collections, though they remain the technology provider, enabling Morrisons to offer click & collect and returns services.

Since its foundation, Doddle's business model has continued to evolve alongside changing customer preferences, pivoting away from owning stores and concessions towards offering its proprietary technology to retailers, posts and parcel carriers. Doddle launched its technology offering, beginning with a click & collect product, in January 2017.

The business has continued to develop new technology across the fulfilment spectrum, including returns and fulfilment from stores.

== Services ==
Doddle partners with several retail brands in the UK, including ASOS, Missguided, River Island and New Look, and provides more than 400 locations where their customers can collect and return their online shopping. Doddle also operates its own retail technology platform. This platform allows retailers such as Missguided and Marks & Spencer to rapidly roll out the latest fulfilment technology, in their own stores, with their own branding.

As of October 2019, it appears that Amazon no longer offers Doddle as a collection point for parcels, and have started to remove some of the web pages related to Doddle from their site. There has been no official statement either from Amazon or Doddle.
