= Doodler =

1970s serial killer in San Francisco

The Doodler
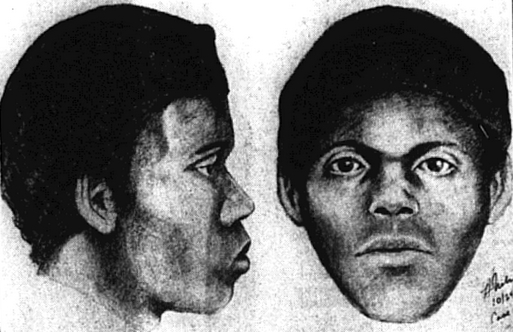
- 1975 police sketch of the suspect
- Born: Unknown
- Other name: The Black Doodler

Details
- Victims: 6–16+ dead, 3 survived
- Span of crimes: January 1974 – September 1975
- Country: United States
- State: California

The Doodler is an unidentified serial killer believed responsible for between 6 and 16 murders and three assaults of men in San Francisco, California, United States, between January 1974 and September 1975. The nickname was given due to the perpetrator's habit of sketching his victims prior to stabbing them to death. The perpetrator met his victims at gay nightclubs, bars and restaurants.

The suspect was described as a black man between 19 and 25 years of age. He was about six feet tall with a slender build. Several victims were stabbed in the front and back of their bodies in similar locations. All of the victims were white males. Police theorized that the victims had all died after meeting with the suspect near the locations where their bodies were recovered.

== Murders ==
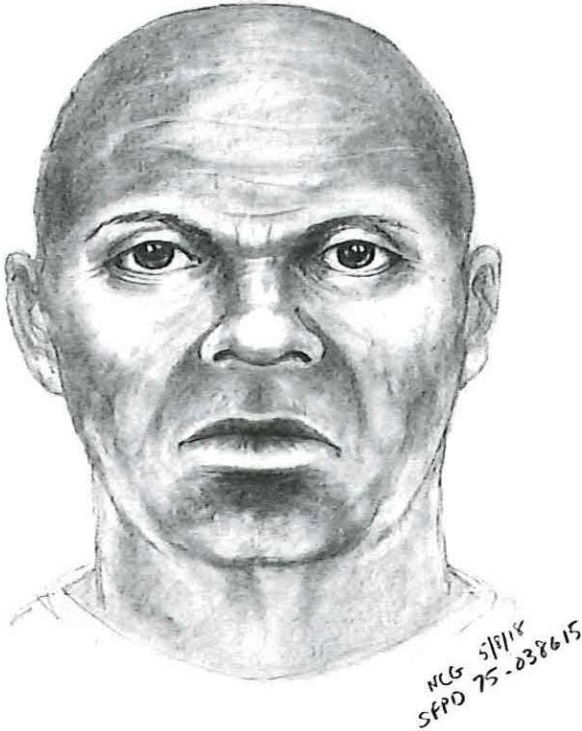
An age progression depicting what the Doodler may have looked like in 2018 at the estimated age of 63 or 69.

- At 1:57 a.m. on January 27, 1974, a corpse was found at the water's edge on San Francisco's Ocean Beach. Gerald Earl Cavanagh, 49, a Canadian-American immigrant, had been stabbed multiple times. Cavanagh's fully clothed body was located lying face-up. He was determined to have been conscious at the time he was killed and had attempted to resist his killer because he had self-defense wounds. He initially remained unidentified, being temporarily known as "John Doe #7" by the medical examiner.
- Joseph "Jae" Stevens, 27, was discovered on June 25, 1974, by a woman walking along Spreckels Lake in San Francisco. Stevens had died shortly before his body was found; he had been seen at a club the previous day. He was employed as a "female impersonator" and comedian. Officers suspected that Stevens was alive at the time he had been at Spreckels Lake, possibly transporting himself to the area with the killer.
- Klaus Achim "Claus" Christmann, 31, a German-American immigrant, was discovered by a woman walking her dog on July 7, 1974. He was found similarly to Gerald Cavanaugh, at Ocean Beach in San Francisco. His death had been somewhat more violent than the previous murders because he had considerably more stab wounds than Stevens and had been slashed in the throat several times. The body was fully clothed. Christmann, unlike the previous victims, was married and had children. The fact that he had a "make-up tube" on his person when he died suggested to police he may have been a closeted gay man. He remained unidentified briefly while police were investigating the cases, which they had believed were related after the third murder.
- In January 2022, the San Francisco Police identified another victim. 52-year-old Warren Andrews, a lawyer for the U.S. Postal Service, was found in Lands End on April 27, 1975. Andrews was found unconscious but never regained consciousness, dying seven weeks later. Andrews had been severely beaten with a rock and a tree branch. Lands End is located just north of Ocean Beach, where four of the other victims' bodies were found.
- Frederick Elmer Capin, 32, was discovered on May 12, 1975, in San Francisco. He had been stabbed like the other victims, dying from strikes to his aorta. It is believed his body had been moved approximately twenty feet as disturbances in the nearby sand indicated. Capin was identified through fingerprints when these were matched to those taken "by the state" due to his occupation as a nurse. He also had served in the United States Navy, earning medals while serving in the Vietnam War.
- Harald Gullberg, 66, was a Swedish-American immigrant who was discovered on June 4, 1975, in a decomposed state about two weeks after his death in Lincoln Park. He remains slightly inconsistent with the other homicides because he was far older than the others, his underwear had been taken by his killer and his pants were unzipped. However, Gullberg is believed to have been the final confirmed victim of the Doodler. While he remained unidentified, he was known as "John Doe #81".

== Investigation ==
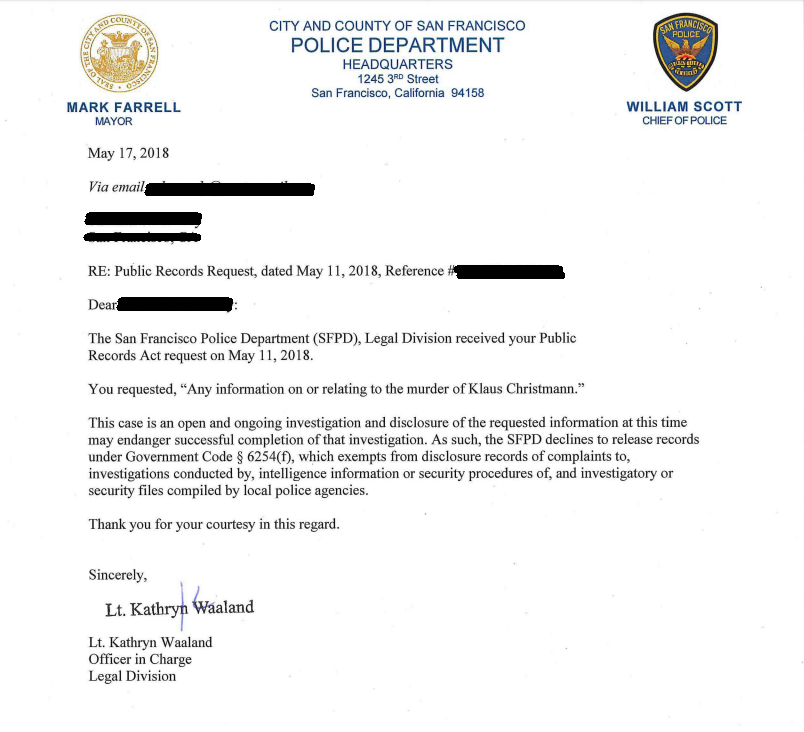
Letter from the SFPD's Legal Division detailing that the case is still active, and therefore they are unable to release any information.

Police questioned a young man as a murder suspect in the case, but could not proceed with criminal charges because the three surviving victims did not want to "out" themselves by testifying against him in court. Among the stabbing survivors were a "well-known entertainer" and a diplomat. The suspect cooperated with police during his interview but he never admitted guilt for the murders and attacks. Officers stated that they strongly believed that the man in question was responsible for the crimes, but he was never tried or convicted because of the survivors' refusals to appear in court. To date, the suspect has not been named publicly or apprehended; very little information is available to the public about the crimes.

The case is open and ongoing in the San Francisco Police Department. Recent successes using DNA technology developed in the decades since the crimes have led police to re-examine evidence in the case. In February 2019, police offered a $100,000 reward for information leading to the arrest of the killer and released a revised sketch showing what he could look like four decades later. They later announced they would consider forensic genetic genealogy, which identified a suspect in the Golden State Killer murders.

== Aftermath ==
At the time, activist Harvey Milk publicly expressed empathy for the victims who refused to speak with police, stating, "I understand their position. I respect the pressure society has put on them." Milk elaborated that the three men likely feared damaging relationships with family and in the workforce, citing that he believed "20% to 25%" of the 85,000 gay men in San Francisco were closeted about their sexualities.

== See also ==
- List of fugitives from justice who disappeared
- List of serial killers in the United States
- List of serial killers by number of victims
