= Assistance Dogs International =

Assistance Dogs international is a combination of non-profit organizations that work together to promote a higher standard of care, training, and placement of assistance dogs worldwide. Founded in 1986 with headquarters in Maumee, Ohio. Assistance Dogs international serves as an international recognized authority on assistance dog programs and authorizing organizations that are able to train dogs to assist with disabilities. This includes but is not limited to dogs for the visually impaired, hearing dogs, and service dogs for those with metal or physical health challenges.

Assistance Dogs International operates as an umbrella organization, containing more than 140 member programs across five continents. These 140 organizations must meet ADI’s attentive standards to become authorized to work with ADI. Ensure these organizations follow ADI’s ethical training practices and follow-up protocols.

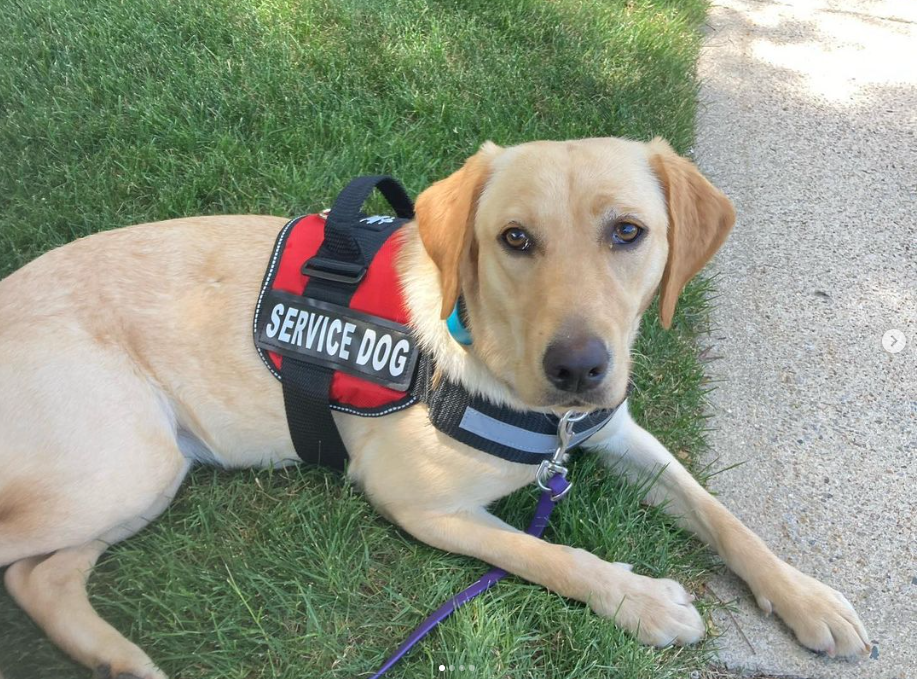
Yellow Lab Service Guide Dog

== Types of Assistance Dogs ==
The members under Assistance Dogs Internationals umbrella train multiple types of assistance dogs, including:

- Guide Dogs: For individuals who are visually impaired.
- Hearing Dogs: For deaf or hard of hearing individuals.
- Medical Condition Dogs: Dogs who alert for seizures or diabetes.
- Mobility Assistance Dogs: For individuals with physical disabilities.
- Psychiatric Service Dogs: For individuals with mental health conditions.

== Collaboration and Advocacy ==
ADI promotes collaboration and advocates for the recognition and rights of assistance dog teams worldwide. They facilitate a network of member organizations through its global initiatives by hosting annual conferences and workshops. Here, experts discuss recent advancements in dog training, care, and disability support.

ADI promotes collaborative research projects among its members to help boost the science of assistance dog training. This includes studied on innovative training methods, genetic research to improve breeding programs for health and temperament suitability, and the psychological and physical benefits of assistance dogs for those with disabilities.

They also play a large role in advocating for the legal recognition and access rights of assistance dogs in public spaces, such as the workplace and housing. ADI partners with organizations to make sure laws like the Americans with Disabilities Act (ADA) are enforced. They also develop educational campaigns to help others understand the assistance dog teams' rights.

== Impact ==
Through Assistance Dogs Internationals large range of member organizations, they have provided thousands of trained service dogs annually to individuals in need. Their commitment to high standards and ethical practices contributes to keeping memberships within organizations.
