= Guiding Eyes for the Blind =

School for training guide dogs

- Formation: 1956
- Type: Not-for-profit corporation
- Headquarters: Yorktown Heights, New York, US
- Founder: Donald Z. Kauth
- President and CEO: Christopher Perry
- Website: www.guidingeyes.org

Guiding Eyes for the Blind is a non-profit school based in Yorktown Heights, New York, that trains guide dogs to aid people who are visually impaired. It also operates a canine development center in Patterson, New York, and a training site in White Plains, New York. It was the first guide dog training school to be accredited by the National Accreditation Council for Agencies Serving the Blind and Visually Handicapped.

== Background ==
Guiding Eyes for the Blind was founded in 1954 by Donald Z. Kauth in a 19th-century farmhouse. Since then, it has graduated over 7,300 guide dog teams and placed 61 service dogs in homes with families with autistic people. All guide dogs are provided to recipients free of charge.

In 1966, Guiding Eyes began breeding their own dogs, and currently breeds more than 90% of the dogs used by the school.

The Canine Development Center (CDC), located in Patterson, New York, is where guide dogs begin their careers. The center's activities include breeding, birthing, socializing, screening, and placing high-potential puppies in puppy-raising homes. Dogs are bred through selective breeding, aiming to maximize qualities required for a working guide dog and minimize health problems that could disrupt or shorten a guide dog's working years.

There are approximately 500 puppies bred at Guiding Eyes each year, half of which become working dogs. The training center also developed a curriculum and training program for those students with multiple disabilities such as deafness or orthopedic problems, in addition to their visual impairment. The Special Needs Program gives selected guide dogs additional training designed for a specific students' unique requirements.

In 2007, the Canine Development Center staff engaged in extensive research in puppy training. Guiding Eyes also acquired an in-house Veterinary Magnetic Resonance Imaging Machine (MRI). In 2011, Guiding Eyes launched its One Step Ahead campaign, a fundraising drive to raise $8 million to build a puppy training academy on its Patterson property.

== Breeding ==
Guiding Eyes for the Blind breeds Labrador Retrievers and German Shepherds. The most commonly used breed is the Labrador Retriever. Most of the dogs are bred from their breeding colony located in Patterson, New York. Dogs are bred for health, confidence, and temperament. The breeding program of Guiding Eyes for the Blind began in 1966.

Dogs are neutered or spayed when they go back to Guiding Eyes. They are then evaluated and the dogs deemed to be the highest quality are selected to participate in breeding programs to pass on their desirable traits to future generations of guide dogs. The dogs undergo further evaluation, including a medical exam, to determine if they are suitable candidates for the breeding program, focusing on hip quality and behavior. In addition to examining the dog, its siblings' progress and health is considered as well, with the dogs that are considered as suitable candidates continuing on to Guide Dog training. The school has had success with the breeding of Labrador Retrievers, with their dogs showing a lower incidence of hip dysplasia than other Labrador Retrievers.

A study done by Cornell University Veterinary School looked at 1,498 dogs from Guiding Eyes for the Blind. The study took measurements of hip joint quality. This included 1,236 connected dogs over 17 generations from a particular male dog. Over half of the Labrador Retrievers were bred at the Guiding Eyes for the Blind facility. Dogs with more accurate breeding values produced more progeny, with clustering of breeding values with higher accuracy indicative of better hip joint confirmation. Overall the study concluded that the selection of dogs for hip joint quality resulted in genetic improvement predominantly in the last 10 to 15 years.

== Dog raising ==
=== First 9 weeks ===
Dog training begins immediately after a guide dog is born. The dogs are born in the Whelping Kennel facility of Guiding Eyes for the Blind (GEB), located in Patterson, New York. The first nine weeks of guide dog training consist of exposure to various environments and experiences to help with their emotional and intellectual development. Volunteers interact with the dogs on a daily basis fostering the bond that must be present between guide dogs and their human companions. In addition, massages are performed on the puppies to help the dogs become familiar with being handled and improve the dogs' health.

Aside from socialization, the dogs are also taught a few basic commands and guide dog etiquette, such as crate and toileting etiquette. The socializers introduce the dogs to the crate early on so that they are familiar with it, focusing on getting the dogs to have a positive attitude towards the crate. The dogs are also house trained and taught to alert their human companion when they need to urinate or defecate.

=== 9 weeks – 18 months ===
After the dog reaches anywhere from 7–9 weeks, they are then matched with a volunteer Puppy Raiser screened by GEB. During this period, the dogs go through training that could be classified as extended socialization. The puppy raisers take the dogs home and teach them how a guide dog is supposed to interact with the outside world. More commands are introduced to the dog, including "stand", "down", "stay", "touch", "back", "heel" and "close". Dogs also learn to keep calm, ignore distractions, and obey their owners in a variety of situations.

During this time, the dogs learn how to greet other people and how to interact with different social settings. To keep track of a dog's progress as well as their training and their raisers, GEB has puppy classes for the raiser/dog pairs. At these classes, the training methods are enforced and the raiser and dog get to practice the commands in a controlled environment. GEB also provides veterinary care for the dogs. During this time, other volunteers will take care of the dogs for a short period of time, exposing them to different environments.

=== Multi-generational fostering ===
A 2011 multi-generational volunteer dog foster program at Atlantic Shores in Virginia Beach, Virginia, brought together qualified retirement community residents and elementary school students. The foster puppies lived with selected senior citizens in the Atlantic Shores retirement community, where the dogs had early exposure to elevators, sidewalks, ramps, wheelchairs, and sliding doors—elements that mirrored the conditions in the second phase, when dogs receive 18 months of formal training. Beginning at 11 weeks of age, the dogs went out to local elementary schools, where classes instructed students about the guide dog service and proper interaction with guide dogs. Students also created their own reporting segments and followed the progress of the guide dogs via class broadcasts on the schools' television feeds.

== Formal training ==
After a dog reaches 13–18 months, they are returned to Guiding Eyes for an In For Training (IFT) test. This test provides information on how well the dog handles stress without a familiar person to support them. If a dog does not do well on their IFT or if they have had a history of consistent insecurities or poor adaptability with their raisers, they are usually released from the program at this point. Other dogs that pass and show promise are either often re-evaluated or start with the training program. Other dogs will join the Guiding Eyes breeding colony, and become parents to future generations of Guiding Eyes dogs.

It takes roughly four months to train a guide dog, with an additional month to train the new owner with the dog. During this time, dogs increase their command vocabulary with more advanced commands such as "find the crossing" and "find the door". The reason for this type of training is for the dog to be able to use their initiative instead of direct obedience. Most of the formal training is done in day-to-day environments like suburbs, busy streets, and rural areas. The only artificial methods of training involve obstacles and traffic work.

The dog learns how to travel to the left and to the right of the obstacles, with a preference that the unit (dog and handler) travel to the right so that the dog is between the obstacle and the owner. At this point in training, the dog is in a full harness.In addition to working on obstacles, there is also traffic work. First, a dog learns to stop at all intersections. The handler then listens whether it is safe to cross or not before giving the command to proceed. However, if a car is coming, the dog will disobey the command and wait for the road to be clear before crossing. To ensure that the training is complete, the handler will often go through the process with the dog wearing a blindfold to make sure that the dog is prepared for their new handler.

Matching a guide dog to a blind person is arguably the most important part of the entire process. Any blind person can apply for the course; however, they receive an in-depth home interview and then are evaluated based on their physical abilities and personalities, before being matched with a dog. The guide dogs and students then meet and spend 26 days at the Yorktown Heights training facility learning to work safely with each other. The four-month process the dogs just went through is approximately repeated, but at a faster pace. At the conclusion of this training, a graduation ceremony is held in celebration of the new partnerships, and puppy raisers get to see their dogs become full-fledged guide dogs. After graduation, Guiding Eyes instructors provide follow-up services, as needed, to graduates in order to provide assistance, suggestions and general support as required. The average working life of a dog is 8–10 years. If possible, the dog will live out his life in the home with the handler. Alternatively, Guiding Eyes will facilitate retired dogs being placed into loving homes.

=== Career change dogs ===
Not every dog who joins the Guiding Eyes program goes on to become a guiding dog. Even dogs who pass their IFTs and go through formal training are sometimes ruled unsuited to become guide dogs. However, some of the personality and temperament traits that make a dog unsuitable for guide dog work are also ideal for detection or patrol work.

== Finances ==
Guiding Eyes is a 501(c)(3) nonprofit organization, funded via private donations. The school does not charge tuition; rather, the dogs, training, students' room and board for 26 days and a follow-up support are provided at no cost to the student.

According to Charity Navigator, GEB had income of $19 million for fiscal year 2009/2010 and assets of $50 million. GEB is an accredited BBB organization and has received a 54.57 rating, or three of four possible stars, at Charity Navigator, not meeting criteria for transparency related to the process of determining compensation of the CEO and not meeting criteria for audited financials.

GEB's biggest fundraiser is an annual golf tournament which has been hosted for the past six years by Eli Manning, quarterback for the New York Giants. The tournament was founded by former professional golfer and golf broadcaster Ken Venturi in 1977 and each year awards the Corcoran Cup, named after Fred Corcoran. GEB's founder, Don Kauth, had encouraged Richard "Dick" Ryan to start a golf tournament. Ryan, an attorney, was GEB's board chairman and represented Augusta National Golf Club. Ryan agreed, naming the tournament after his business partner, Corcoran. The golf tournament, sponsored by Entergy, Pepsi and others, has raised over $7 million for Guiding Eyes since its creation in 1977.

Since 2008, Guiding Eyes has operated an e-storefront with Lands' End via that company's Business Outfitters division. Customers can order clothing embroidered with logos associated with the dog breeds bred and trained by Guiding Eyes in their work: yellow and black Labrador Retrievers, Golden Retrievers and German Shepherds. The artwork was produced by a company in Norwalk, Connecticut, TFI/Envision.

In 2010, Guiding Eyes initiated expansion of its canine development center from 16,000 square feet to 30,000 square feet in a three-phase $7.8 million construction project. The first phase included a whelping kennel and outdoor work area, the second phase (projected for 2013) will include a breeding and puppy socialization kennel, and the third phase will include a 1,500-square foot veterinary hospital.

CharityWatch rates Guiding Eyes for the Blind a "B" grade.

== See also ==
- Assistance dog
- Blindness
- Guide horse
- List of guide dog schools
- Service dog
- White cane
