= Guide horse =

Equine service animal assisting blind persons

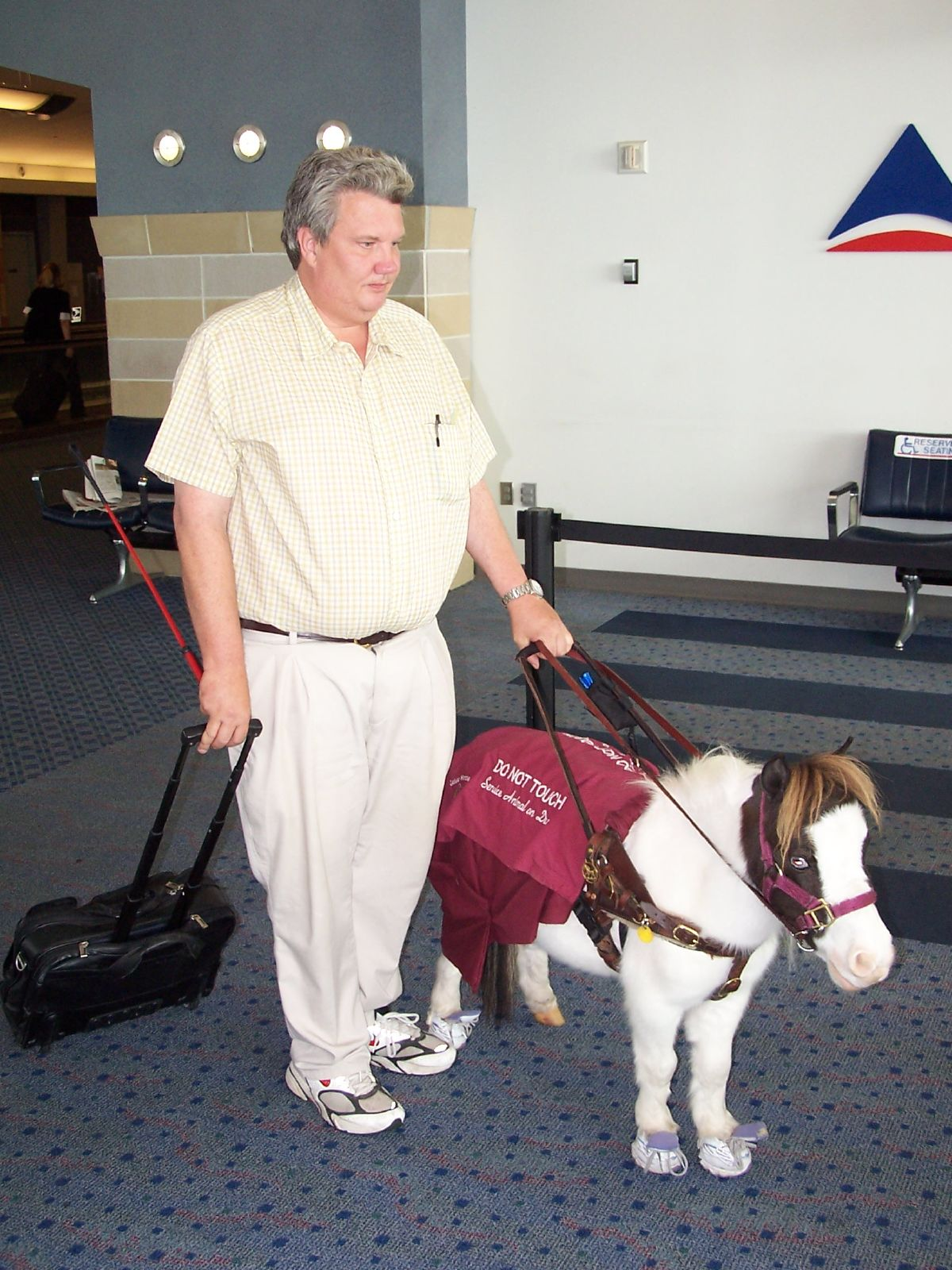
A miniature horse working as a service animal.

A guide horse is an alternative mobility option for blind people who do not wish to or cannot use a guide dog.

== History ==
The idea of a guide horse for a blind person dates back to 1943 if not earlier, the film The Blocked Trail of that year having a dwarf horse guide a blind miner. The Burlesons though may appear to have a claim for the practical proposal of using a miniature horse as a service animal for the blind or partially sighted. In 1998, while on a horseback ride in New York City, Janet and Don Burleson of Kittrell, North Carolina, noticed how their horses were able to sense on their own when to cross the street. Janet recalled watching a blind rider compete in horse shows where "the woman gave the horse directions, and it took her around the obstacles and the other horses in the class. It was serving as her guide and that was something I'd never forgotten." She wondered if a miniature horse could be trained as a guide animal for the blind. Janet had trained Arabian show horses for 30 years and was familiar with equine behavior. But her urban experience changed her view of the behavior exhibited by one of their pet miniature horses, "Twinkie", on their farm back home. The animal often followed the Burlesons around like a dog, and rode in the back of their minivan. From these experiences, they began training miniature horses to be seeing eye horses.

Their first trainee was Twinkie. From that start, the Burlesons developed a rigorous training program for miniature horses that was similar to a guide dog's, adding systematic desensitization training, similar to that given horses used for riot control. There were setbacks; the first time they took a miniature horse to the grocery store, it grabbed a Snickers bar off the shelf. The goal was to train these small horses to meet all requirements to become a guide animal for the blind.

One of the first people to use a guide horse was Dan Shaw. At age 17, he was diagnosed with retinitis pigmentosa, an incurable eye disease that deteriorates vision over time. In 1998 he attended a school for the blind to learn basic skills, such as how to read Braille. However, he stated, "... I was shocked at how few options I had. I didn't want to struggle with a white cane, and I couldn't bear the idea of having a guide dog because of the grief I had experienced when my beloved pet dog died 10 years before. I knew I'd feel the loss of an animal I had relied on for my independence even more acutely."

In 1999 the Burlesons created The Guide Horse Foundation (Note: By November 2010 The Guide Horse Foundation suspended applications from prospective clients.) to provide miniature horses as assistance animals to blind users living in rural environments.

Shaw heard about the Burlesons' experimental program, and was particularly interested when he found out that horses live thirty to forty years. So he applied to be the first person in the world to use a guide horse. The Burlesons started training "Cuddles" for Shaw. On March 6, 2002, he flew to Raleigh, North Carolina, and met Cuddles for the first time. After some introductory work, Janet Burleson sent Shaw and Cuddles into a crowded store where the aisles were jammed with merchandise, and they successfully navigated the store. Shaw stated, "I was about to become the world's first user of a guide horse. I knew that there would be skeptics—people who didn't believe horses had the right temperament to be service animals. After all, in the 1920s, when Dorothy Eustis began training German Shepherds to lead the blind, many people scoffed at the idea. But I knew that getting my independence back would outweigh any criticism."

Another user received her horse "Panda" in 2003, and in 2007 the Associated Press reported the owner describing her guide as "protective, alert and house-trained -- and she loves to play fetch. And at 29 inches tall and 120 pounds, she's a darn small horse."

=== United Kingdom ===
A guide horse, "Digby", claimed to be Britain's first, was introduced to a BBC journalist for training in February 2018. Unfortunately the miniature horse underwent a height growth spurt to 33 inches (0.84 m) which proved too tall for its handler's office in Salford, Manchester. It had also become "awkward", knocking items off of supermarket shelves.

== Guide horse as service animal ==
=== Official recognition ===
In the United States, on 15 September 2010, the Department of Justice (DOJ) clarified the Americans with Disabilities Act (ADA) and ruled that properly trained and suitably sized miniature Guide Horses could be recognized as service animals.

=== Features ===
Miniature horses, with an average lifespan of thirty years, live much longer than dogs, and for those allergic to or frightened of dogs, a horse could make a good alternative. However, while a dog can adapt to many different home situations, a horse must live outdoors, requiring a shelter and room to move about when not on duty.

Guide horse users may also find difficulty in transporting a miniature horse on limited-spaced public transportation, such as on buses or taxis. Some individuals also are concerned that a horse's powerful fight-or-flight instinct may lead it to have less predictable behavior than that of a guide dog.

The Guide Horse Foundation suggest a house-trained guide horse should typically be able to control its bladder for six hours; however for transportation purposes it is suggested a practical estimate of four hours should be used.

=== Training ===
The process of training a guide horse is rigorous and takes about eight months for each horse. The Burlesons developed a training programme which began initially with the horse trained in basic lead work, in which the horse is taught to move at the speed that the handler commands and to navigate common obstacles. Next, the horse is trained in voice command recognition, and taught to respond to 23 voice commands. The horse is then taught to maneuver around both stationary and moving obstacles. After this, the horse is trained to signal to the handler when there is a step or ramp. Finally, the horse is housebroken, generally an easy process because of horses' natural aversion to depositing fecal waste indoors. Intelligent disobedience is a crucial part of the training of the guide horse, as the horse must be able to disregard any commands that would be unsafe to the horse and the handler.

=== Suitability ===
- Horses normally live to be 25–35 years old. This is far longer than the lifespan of a dog (8–16 years, depending upon breed).
- On average, miniature horses may live one-third longer than large horses.
- Miniature horses chosen for assistance horse training weigh approximately 25–45 kg (55–100 pounds).
- Eyesight is vital for a guide animal for blind users. Horses generally possess excellent vision. With eyes placed on the sides of their heads, they possess nearly 350 degree vision, are sensitive to motion in their field of vision, and often detect a potential hazard before their sighted trainers. Horses also have excellent night vision and can see clearly in almost total darkness.
- Miniature horses are, in general, not suited for assisting people who are deaf or hearing impaired. Most dog breeds have a natural "watchdog instinct" that is important for a hearing assistance animal; horses do not have this instinct.
