= Guide Dogs for the Blind =

American guide dog school

- Formation: 1942; 84 years ago
- Tax ID no.: 94-1196195
- Location: San Rafael, California
- Revenue: $77,919,348 (2020)
- Website: www.guidedogs.com

Guide Dogs for the Blind (GDB) is a guide dog school located in the United States, with campuses in San Rafael, California, and Boring, Oregon. It was founded in 1942 by Lois Merrihew and Don Donaldson to help veterans who had been blinded in World War II. Guide Dogs for the Blind has about 2100 Guide Dog teams across the United States and Canada.

Guide Dogs for the Blind was established in 1942 in response to the need for service dogs to help wounded servicemen that were coming back blind from World War II. The first building it operated in was a rented house in Los Gatos, California. The first dog to graduate through the program was a rescued German Shepherd named Blondie; she was paired with Sgt. Leonard Foulk. In 1947, the organization moved to their current location in San Rafael, California and in 1995 started a program at a second campus in Boring, Oregon. Today GDB is the largest guide dog school in the United States. This non-profit organization provides services to blind and visually impaired individuals from the United States and Canada for no cost including well-trained service dogs and the veterinary care that goes with them.

== Breeds and Breeding ==
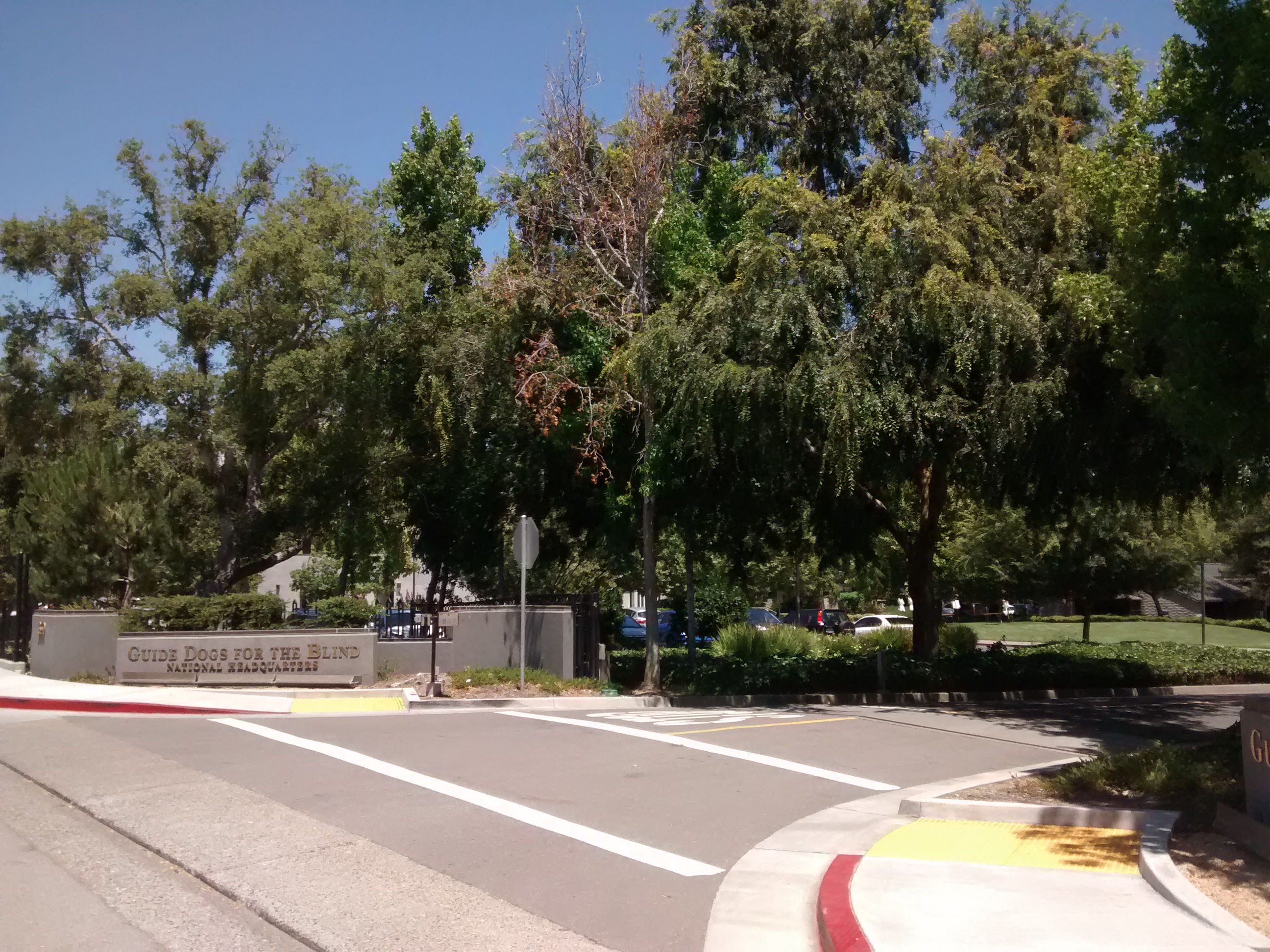
Entrance to the San Rafael campus

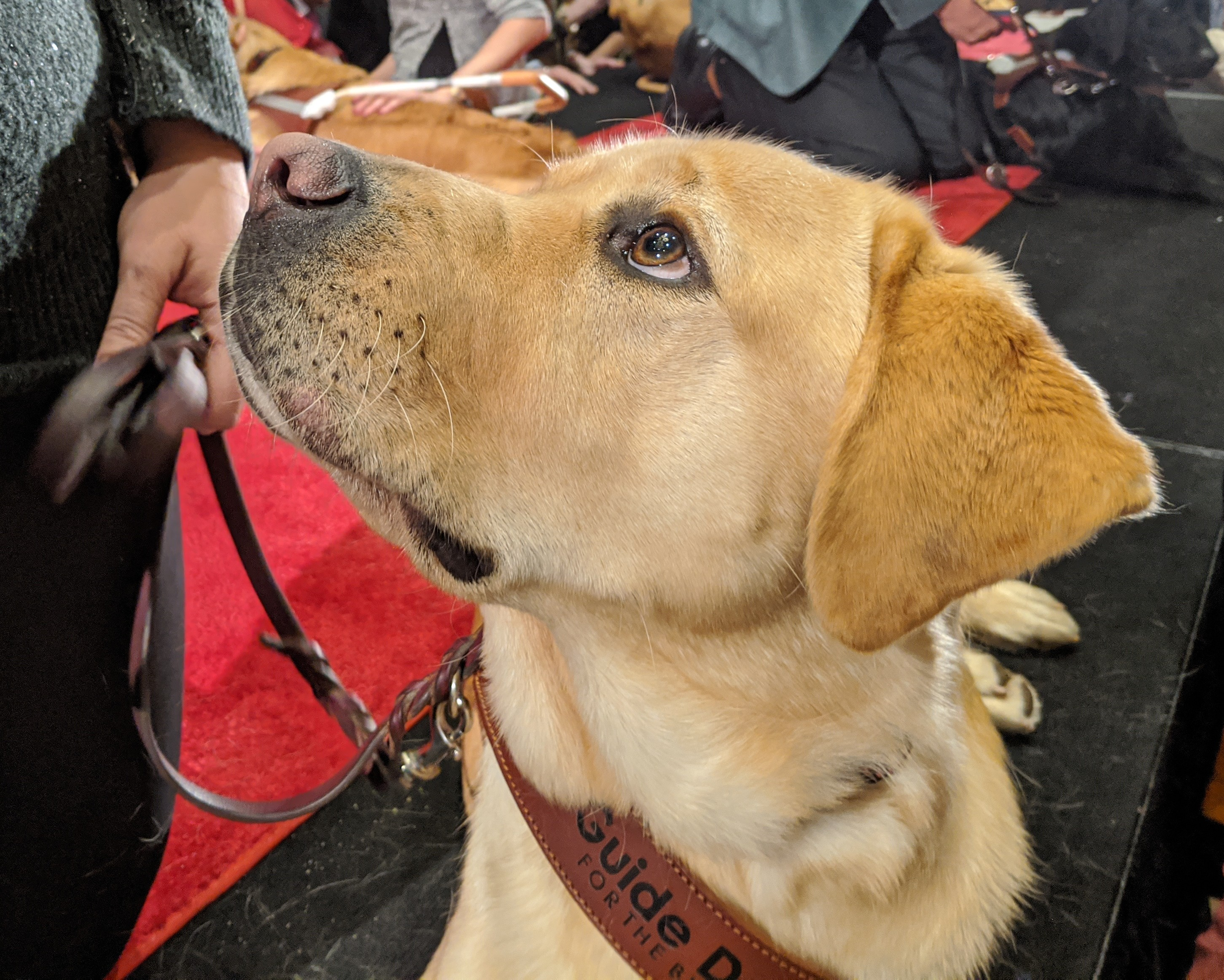
A Guide Dogs Labrador Retriever

Over the years Guide Dogs for the Blind has worked with different breeds of dogs in order to find the best for training, as well as being a lifelong companion. They started off with rescued dogs and in the 1940s started their own breeding program. At the time, they were mostly German Shepherds, which became the breed of choice for many guide dog organizations, and GDB used them all the way until 2007, at which point they reevaluated the success of the breed. Today, they have a healthy breeding colony consisting of Labrador Retrievers, Golden Retrievers, and Lab/Golden crosses. Guide Dogs focuses its breeding on the qualities needed in a guide including excellent health, willingness to work, high desire to please, intelligence, and an easy-to-work-with temperament.

Guide Dogs for the Blind also participates in an international program in which guide dogs schools from around the world work together to diversify the gene pool in the breeding colonies by providing puppies from high success parents to other schools. This creates a healthier breeding colony for all who participate.

== Puppy Raising ==
Puppy raising is one of the dog programs in which volunteers are needed. These volunteers sign up to receive a puppy who is about eight weeks old and will take care of, train, and socialize their dog until they are about 13-15 months old. Puppy raisers belong to a local club where they get support and training on how to best work with their puppy. They are responsible for teaching the dog basic obedience and good manners while home and out working. The puppy raising program currently exists in the following states (Arizona, California, Colorado, Idaho, Nevada, New Mexico, Oregon, Texas, Utah, and Washington.). There are currently more than 2,000 families who are participating in this puppy raising program.

== Training and Graduation ==
The dogs are recalled for formal training at one of Guide Dogs for the Blind's campuses between 13 and 15 months old at which point they start going through intense training with specialized instructors. This training consists of an eight-phase program in which the dog gradually learns more guide work. This includes leading a person in a straight line, stopping at any change in ground elevation as well as overhead obstacles, and obstacle avoidance. This 8 phase program typically lasts two to three months and if a dog passes their final walk with a blindfolded trainer they are considered "class ready." This means that at that point GDB starts to look for a good match. When it comes to putting together a team Guide Dogs for the Blind considers the lifestyle of the individual and the dog, the speed of their gaits, the size of the dog, as well as other issues that may affect the dog's ability to guide (e.g. a dog who hates water going to a rainy place). Any person who is blind or visually impaired desiring enhanced mobility and independence can benefit from having the independence a guide dog can provide. The person must be legally blind, able to travel independently, and suited to work with a dog. Typically, six to eight students take part in each of GDB's two-week training sessions. Typically two students are paired with a state-certified instructor during this two-week period. If the student and dog bond and work well together, they will graduate from the program in an official ceremony in which the puppy-raising family will formally present the dog to their new partner.

== Career change dogs ==
Dogs that are not suitable for guide dog work due to health or behavior issues are dropped from training and are described as "career changed." The first characteristic that GDB looks for in career-changed dogs is a temperament that would work well with a child. If dogs have this, they may be entered into the K9 Buddy program at GDB. The program places these dogs as pets with visually impaired children, giving the children not only companionship, but also the opportunity to learn to care for a dog. This experience helps prepare them for the responsibilities involved with having a guide dog someday. If a child goes through the K9 Buddy program they are qualified to receive a guide dog at an earlier age.

If a dog is also not suitable to be a K9 Buddy, career-changed dogs will also be examined to see if they are fit to be of service to other organizations. Many dogs go on to have different careers that assist people and communities in a wide variety of service roles. Some of the organizations they work with include Dogs for Diabetes, Hearing Dog Program, Search and Rescue, as well as others. If the dog is not suitable for any other organization, then the puppy raiser has the option to adopt the dog. If the puppy raiser does not adopt the dog, GDB will find a suitable adoptive family for the dog. They take great care in matching these career-changed dogs to their new families and are dedicated to the success of that relationship. Adoption is only open to those individuals living in the following states: Arizona, California, Colorado, Idaho, Nevada, New Mexico, Oregon, Utah, Washington, and North Texas.

== Funding ==
Guide Dogs for the Blind (or GDB) is a nonprofit, tax-exempt organization supported entirely by private donations. GDB receives no government funding and there are no costs for individuals who receive a guide dog. Donors contribute through general contributions, bequests, grants, memorial and honor donations, charitable remainder trusts and other planned giving options.

== See also ==
- List of Guide Dog Schools

== External resources ==
- Roselle- The September 11th Guide Dog from Guide Dogs for the Blind
