= The Seeing Eye =

Non-profit organization in the USA

Coordinates: 40.79813°N 74.51237°W

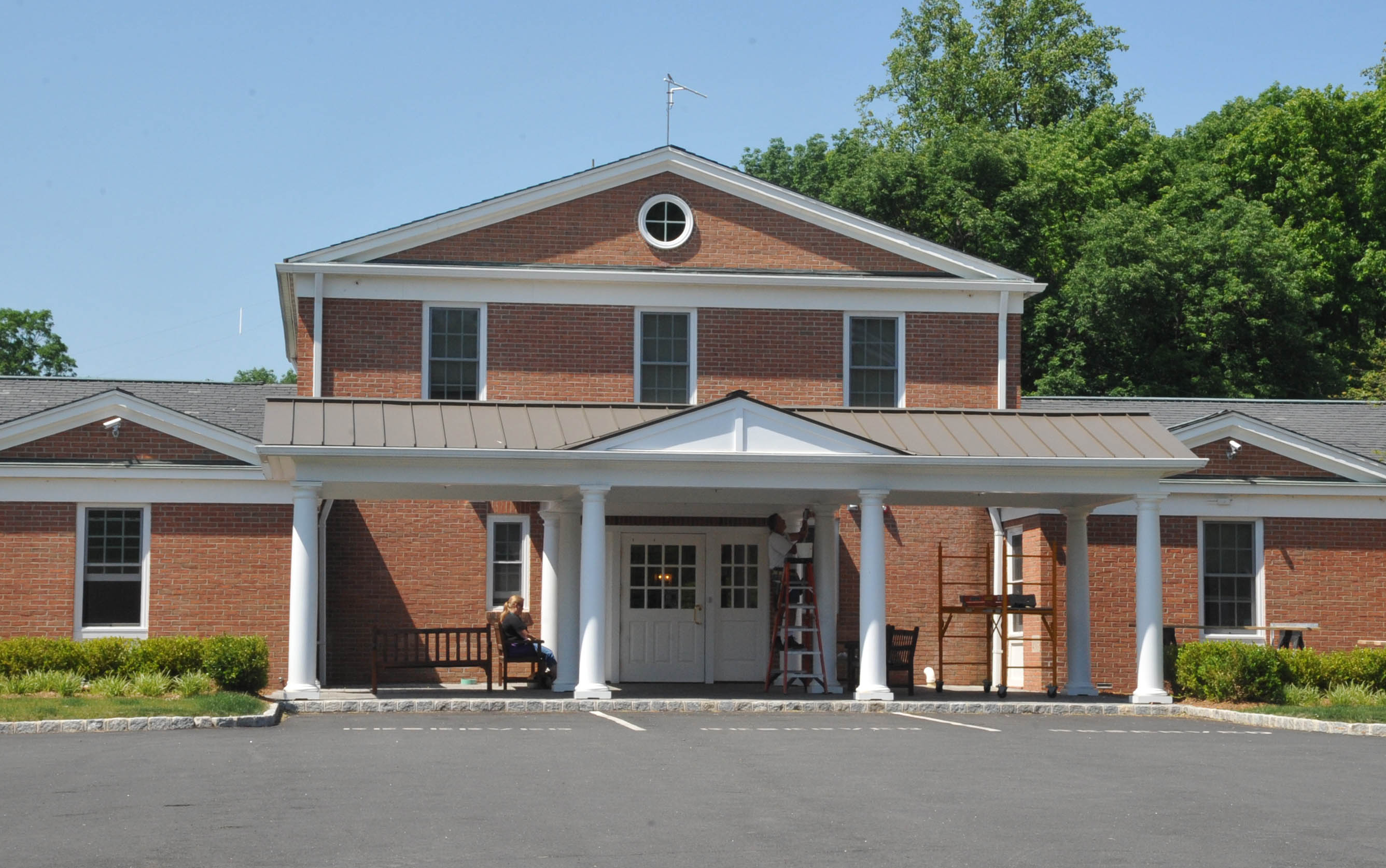
- Location: Morris Township, New Jersey, US

The Seeing Eye, Inc. is a guide dog school located in Morris Township, New Jersey, in the United States. Founded in 1929, the Seeing Eye is the oldest guide dog school in the U.S., and one of the largest.

The Seeing Eye campus includes administrative offices, dormitory residence for students, a veterinary care center, and kennels; there is also a breeding station in Chester, NJ.

A founding member of the U.S. Council of Guide Dog Schools and a fully accredited member of the International Guide Dog Federation, The Seeing Eye is a lead researcher in canine genetics, breeding, disease control, and behavior.

The Seeing Eye matches an average of 260 people who are blind or visually impaired each year with Seeing Eye dogs. As of 2023, there were about 1,700 active users of Seeing Eye dogs in the United States and Canada, and The Seeing Eye had matched (since its founding) more than 17,500 people and dogs.

== History ==
The history of The Seeing Eye began in Europe in the 1920s when Dorothy Harrison Eustis moved to Vevey, Switzerland, from the United States to set up a breeding and training facility for German Shepherds. Elliott S. "Jack" Humphrey was an American trainer and geneticist who helped Eustis train and develop their own scientific approach to breeding and training.

During World War I, many German soldiers were blinded or visually impaired due to the war, so several schools in Germany began experimenting with guide dogs that were taught specific skills. Eustis wrote an article about it for The Saturday Evening Post called "The Seeing Eye," that was published on November 5, 1927. Eustis began receiving letters from people who were blind, asking how to obtain a guide dog. Her article was read to Morris Frank, a 19-year-old blind man from Nashville, Tennessee. Frank, who had been blinded in two separate accidents, believed a guide dog would help him regain his independence. Eustis received his letter and although she did not train dogs for the blind, she decided to help Frank. Frank stated that, in addition to wanting a guide dog, he intended to further the work of training guide dogs for the blind in the U.S. Eustis and Humphrey began to research and modify their own training, as they had previous experience training other types of working dogs, but not guide dogs. In April 1928, Frank met his first guide dog, named Kiss. He changed her name to Buddy and named all his future Seeing Eye dogs (he had six in total) Buddy. The name is now retired by The Seeing Eye. Frank and Buddy went through six weeks of training that not only created a strong bond, but also taught them to work as a team to navigate busy streets, dangerous obstacles, stairways, crowded shops, and anything that was a danger for Frank. On January 29, 1929, Eustis and Frank established The Seeing Eye in Frank's hometown of Nashville.

The first class was held in February 1929. After several successful graduates were able to demonstrate the usefulness of a guide dog, people started to accept the idea. Morris Frank and Buddy traveled the U.S. acting as ambassadors for people with disabilities and service dogs.

Mary Dranga Campbell became the head of the social service division in 1934 and retired 11 years later. The Seeing Eye moved to Whippany, New Jersey in 1931, establishing a permanent location for training and student housing. In 1965, the organization moved to its current 60-acre campus in Morris Township, NJ, which includes administrative offices, student residences, a veterinary clinic and kennels. After her death in 1968, Kay Francis estate gave greater than $1 million to this organization.

The Seeing Eye was the first guide dog school outside of Europe, and is the oldest existing guide dog school in the world. In 2024, The Seeing Eye celebrated its 95th anniversary. In 2020, the Seeing Eye Dog was designated as the state dog of New Jersey.

In April 2005, a lifelike bronze statue of Morris Frank and his dog Buddy was erected on the northeast corner of the Morristown Green. Frank is depicted giving the "forward command."

The Seeing Eye was instrumental in the passage of statewide legislation that made it a criminal offense to harm a service dog and/or service dog-in-training. The bill was inspired by a Seeing Eye puppy-in-training named Dusty, who was severely injured after a pit bull attack, and had to leave the program. On January 17, 2014, Dusty's Law was signed by Governor Chris Christie.

In September 2021, Jim Kutsch, the first graduate of the school to become CEO of the school, was honored with a portrait and a statue on the Morris Township campus. Board member and former New Jersey Governor Tom Kean was present at the ceremony.

== Breeds ==
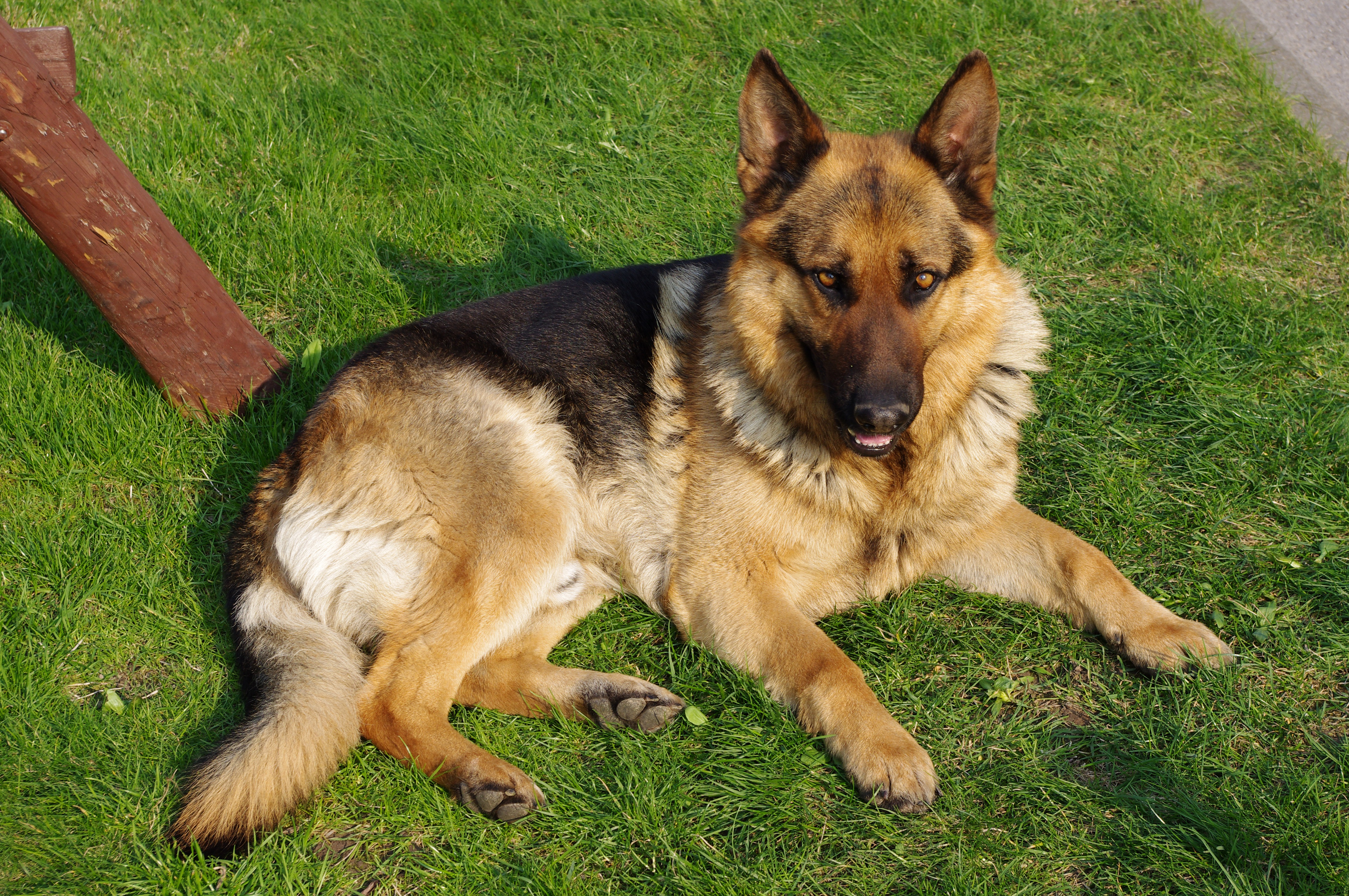
German Shepherds

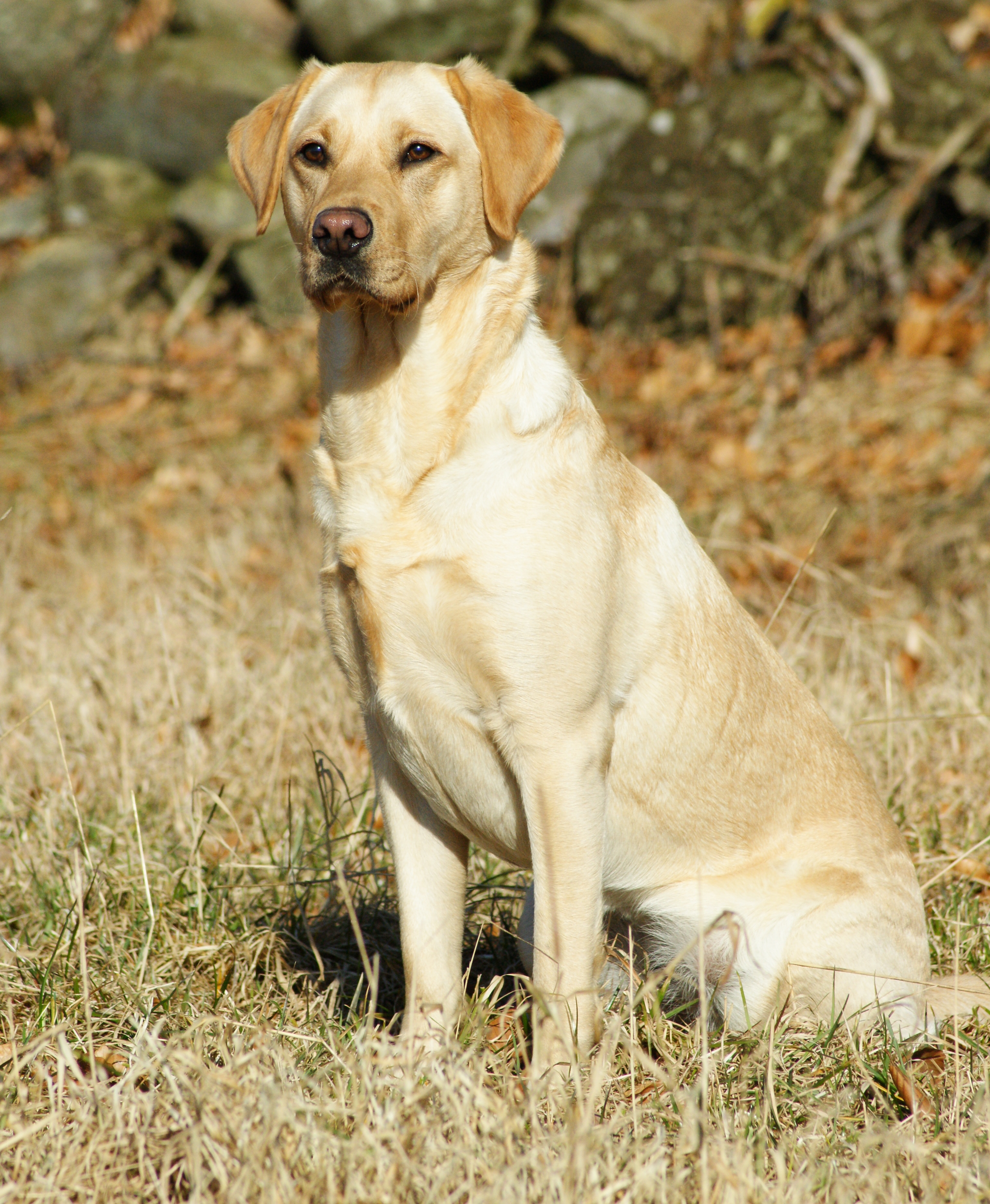
Labrador Retrievers

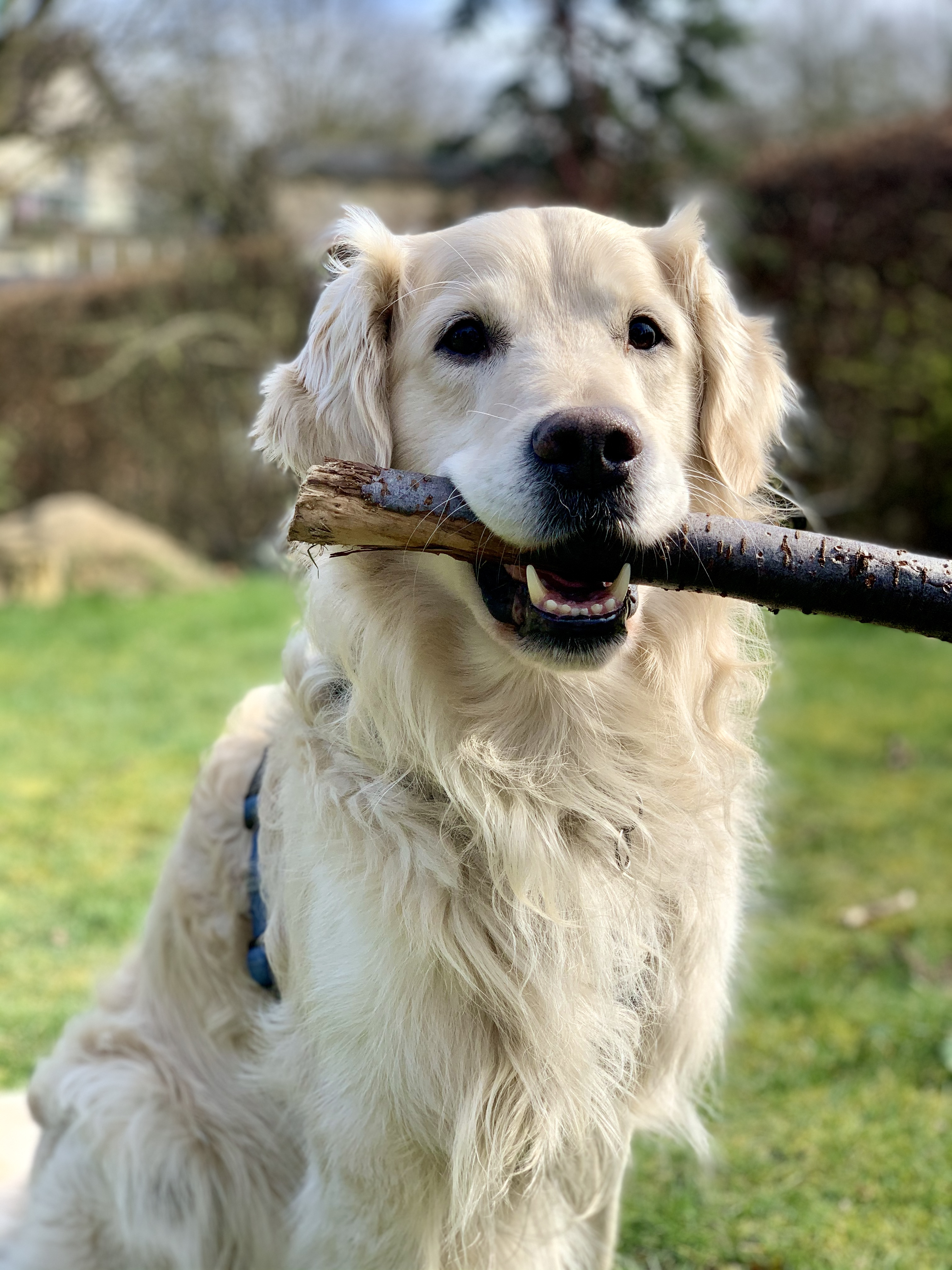
Golden Retrievers

In 2001, The Seeing Eye built a breeding station on 330 acres in Chester, New Jersey, in which it houses adult breeding dogs and puppies until they are seven or eight weeks old. This replaced a breeding station in Mendham that had been used since 1948. Over thirty breeds have been trained by the Seeing Eye; those currently bred at Chester include German Shepherds, Labrador Retrievers, Golden Retrievers, and a Labrador/golden cross.

== Basic training ==
When the puppies are 7 to 8 weeks old, they are delivered to the homes of volunteer puppy raisers, who care for them until they are about 13 to 16 months old. The Seeing Eye, with 4-H, organized puppy-raising clubs starting in 1942. Many of the clubs still have a strong 4-H connection. Puppy raisers are expected to teach the dogs house manners and to enable them to get social experience.

== Formal training ==
After returning to the Seeing Eye campus at age 13 to 19 months, a dog goes through four months of formal training. The guide is assigned to an instructor, who trains it to guide its handler around obstacles, alert the handler to changes in elevation and tripping hazards, and navigate street crossings. The dog is taught intelligent disobedience, that is, to ignore a command that would jeopardize the safety of the dog and handler.

A prospective guide dog handler is matched with a trained dog. Handler and dog live and train together on the Seeing Eye campus for 25 days (18 days for a returning handler). Upon returning home, the handler has ownership of the dog.

== Financials ==
Under The United States IRS section 501(c)(3), The Seeing Eye, inc is registered as a non-profit organization. The school does not receive any government funding.

== See also ==
- List of guide dog schools
