= Guide Dogs Singapore =

Non-profit social service organization in Singapore

Guide Dogs Singapore Ltd
- Abbreviation: GDS
- Formation: 2006; 20 years ago
- Type: Charity
- Registration no.: 200302260G
- Headquarters: 20 Sin Ming Ln, #02-53, Singapore 573968
- Website: https://guidedogs.org.sg/
- Formerly called: Guide Dogs Association of the Blind (GDAB)

Guide Dogs Singapore (GDS) is a non-profit social service organization that helps the visually handicapped in Singapore. GDS advocates the use and normalization of using guide dogs in helping the visually handicapped, especially allowing guide dogs to enter food establishments. GDS also trains guide dogs.

== History ==
Guide Dogs Singapore was founded in 2006 to assist the visually handicapped in Singapore. GDS has trained 11 guide dogs, of which 6 are in operation.

In 2013, Law Minister K. Shanmugam stated at a dinner organized by GDS that there has to be a, "more supportive regulatory framework" towards guide dogs.

In 2017, Christina Teng became Singapore's first local guide dog instructor after undergoing training at Guide Dogs Victoria in Melbourne from 2018 to 2020 to get her Guide Dog Mobility Instructor certificate. She also trained Eve, the first guide dog to be trained in Singapore.

In 2018, GDS planned to raise S$100,000 to train 2 more guide dogs.

== See also ==
- List of social service agencies in Singapore
- List of disability organisations in Singapore
- List of guide dog schools
