= List of guide dog schools =

Guide dogs are assistance dogs trained to lead blind and visually impaired people around obstacles. In the United States, the name "seeing eye dog" is only used in reference to a guide dog from The Seeing Eye in Morristown, New Jersey, which has trademarked the term. Guide dog schools are accredited by the International Guide Dog Federation.

== Europe ==
- Associação Beira Aguieira de Apoio ao Deficiente Visual, Mortágua, Portugal
- The Guide Dogs for the Blind Association
- Lara Guide-Dog School Hellas, Xalandri, Greece
- Seeing Dogs Alliance, Surrey, England
- Stiftung Schweizerische Schule für Blindenführhunde (Swiss School for Guide Dogs Foundation)
- Fundación ONCE del Perro Guía (FOPG), Spain
- Entrevues, Chiens guides et mobilité, Belgium
- Les Amis des Aveugles et Malvoyants, Belgium
- The Royal Dutch Guide Dog Foundation (KNGF), The Netherlands

== Middle East & Africa ==
- Israel Guide Dog Center for the Blind
- South African Guide Dogs Association for the Blind

== North America ==
- British Columbia and Alberta Guide Dog Services, Delta, British Columbia, Canada
- Canadian Guide Dogs for the Blind, Ottawa, Ontario, Canada
- CNIB Guide Dogs, Carleton Place, Ontario, Canada
- Dogs with Wings, Edmonton, Alberta, Canada
- Fidelco Guide Dog Fountation, Bloomfield, Connecticut, USA
- Freedom Guide Dogs for the Blind, Cassville, New York, USA
- Guide Dog Foundation for the Blind, Inc., Smithtown, New York, USA
- Guide Dogs for the Blind, San Rafael, California and Boring, Oregon, USA
- Guide Dogs of America, Sylmar, California, USA
- Guide Dogs of the Desert, Palm Springs, California, USA
- Guide Dogs of Texas, San Antonio, Texas, USA
- Guiding Eyes for the Blind, Yorktown Heights, New York, USA
- KSDS Inc., Washington, Kansas, USA
- Leader Dogs for the Blind, Rochester, Michigan, USA
- Lions Foundation of Canada Dog Guides, Oakville, Ontario, Canada
- Mira Foundation, Sainte-Madeleine, Quebec, Canada
- Mira Foundation USA, Aberdeen, North Carolina, USA
- OccuPaws Guide Dog Association, Madison, Wisconsin, USA
- Pilot Dogs, Columbus, Ohio, USA
- The Seeing Eye, Morristown, New Jersey, USA
- Dogs Inc (Formerly Southeastern Guide Dogs Inc), Palmetto, Florida, USA

== South America ==
- Helen Keller Guide Dog School, Balneário Camburiú, Santa Catarina State, Brazil

== Asia ==
=== Japan ===
- Chubu Guide Dogs for the Blind Association
- Guide Dog and Service Dog and Hearing Dog Association of Japan
- Hokkaido Guide Dogs for the Blind Association
- Hyogo Guide Dogs for the Blind Association
- Japan Guide Dog Association
- Kansai Guide Dogs for the Blind Association
- Kyushu Guide Dog Association
- Nippon Lighthouse Guide Dog Training Centre
- East Japan Guide Dog Association
- The Eye Mate, Inc.

=== South Korea ===
- Samsung Guide Dog School
- Korean Assistance Dog Association

=== Taiwan ===
- Taiwan Guide Dog Association
- Huikuang Guide Dog Foundation Taiwan

=== Singapore ===
- Guide Dogs Singapore

== Oceania ==
=== New Zealand ===
- Royal New Zealand Foundation of the Blind, Newmarket, Auckland

=== Australia ===
- Royal Guide Dogs Associations of Australia
  - Guide Dogs Victoria, Melbourne, Australia
  - Guide Dogs NSW/ACT, New South Wales & Australian Capital Territory
  - Guide Dogs SA/NT, South Australia
  - Guide Dogs TAS, Hobart, Tasmania
  - Guide Dogs WA, Perth, Western Australia
- Royal Society for the Blind, South Australia
- Seeing Eye Dogs Australia

== Sources ==
- "Guide Dog Schools Around the World". Land of Pure Gold Foundation.
- "Guide Dog Schools". Archived from the original on 2006-10-17.
