= Nikolai Liakhoff =

Russian guide dog trainer (1898–1962)

Nikolai Liakhoff, MBE (1897–1962) was a Russian guide dog trainer. Born in Odessa, now in Ukraine, Liakhoff won a bravery award while serving as a Cossack guard in World War I. He evacuated to Constantinople (now Istanbul) in late 1920, where he met his wife, the Russian princess Irena Ourousoff, whom he married in 1925. He did several odd jobs in Europe before working with the organisation L'Oeil qui Voit, led by the American guide dog trainer Dorothy Eustis. Her guide dog school collapsed due to the Great Depression, so Liakhoff was given the choice of working in the US or the UK; he reportedly chose the UK because it had a monarchy.

In 1933, Liakhoff went to the UK to be the trainer for The Guide Dogs for the Blind Association, which was founded in 1934. Involved from the earliest stages of the charity's life, Liakhoff and his program was instrumental in the successful development of guide dog training in the UK. Liakhoff was awarded an MBE in 1953.
