= The Guide Dogs for the Blind Association =

British charitable organisation

- Guide Dogs logo
- Abbreviation: Guide Dogs
- Formation: 30 August 1934; 92 years ago
- Type: Charity
- Headquarters: Hillfields, Reading, Berkshire, RG7 3YG
- Region served: United Kingdom
- Chairman: Isabel Hudson
- CEO: Andrew Lennox
- Staff: 1,500
- Volunteers: 14,000
- Website: guidedogs.org.uk

The Guide Dogs for the Blind Association, often known as Guide Dogs, is a British charitable organization that provides guide dogs to those who are vision impaired. The organisation also engages in public campaigns and advocacy to promote accessibility and disability rights for those with vision impairments. Guide Dogs works with more than 28,000 volunteer advocates across the UK to support these issues.

The charity's royal patron is the Duchess of Edinburgh, who succeeded Princess Alexandra, The Honourable Lady Ogilvy as patron in 2021. Its head office is near Reading in Berkshire. The charity operates eight regional centres in Belfast, Cardiff, Forfar, Leeds, Atherton, Leamington Spa, Redbridge and Bristol. Four of these regional centres (Forfar, Atherton, Leamington, and Redbridge) are also established as guide dog training schools. Along with that, there are 14 community teams in Glasgow, Newcastle, Liverpool, Nottingham, Shrewsbury, Birmingham, Welwyn, central London, Maidstone, Reading, Southampton and Exeter. There is also a National Breeding Centre near Leamington Spa.

In 2023 and 2024, the charity reduced staff numbers and stopped an IT project, to minimise costs in order to keep its services running.

== Services ==
Guide Dogs, historically focused on training and pairing guide dogs with adults experiencing visual impairment, has expanded its services since the early 2010s to include a wider range of support for children, young individuals, and families who have been affected by sight loss.

=== Guide Dogs ===
The organisation's guide dog service pairs blind or partially-sighted individuals with specially trained dogs, predominantly bred in-house rather than sourced externally. To ensure genetic diversity, there are instances of exchanging sperm samples with other guide dog organisations globally. The charity primarily breeds Labradors, golden retrievers, German shepherds, curly-coated retrievers, and standard poodles.

Guide dog puppies are typically born and raised by volunteer breeding dog holders in a domestic setting. At six weeks old, the puppies undergo health checks and vaccinations at Guide Dogs' National Centre in Leamington Spa, Warwickshire. Subsequently, they are placed with volunteer puppy raisers who introduce them to essential obedience skills and help them get used to everyday environments such as shops, offices, cafes, restaurants, and public transport.

Formal training for the dogs commences after 12 to 14 months and spans approximately 26 weeks, including a three-to-five-week period of intensive training where the dog trains directly with its future owner.

Guide dogs retire on or before their eleventh birthday - depending on the dog and owner. Many retire due to the health of the dog or a change in circumstances of the guide dog owner. Many dogs stay with their guide dog owners, but some are adopted by members of the public. Martin Clunes adopted such a dog and made a TV programme about it.

In 2020, there were 4,800 working guide dog partnerships in the UK. By 2022, this had gone down to 3,695. Even with recent financial pressures, such as rising staff costs and decreased income, the charity continues to operate a large guide dog training programme.

=== Buddy Dogs ===
Buddy dogs help children and young people who are blind or partially sighted to build confidence in themselves and trust in their surroundings. Guide Dogs piloted the service in 2011 and launched it as a permanent service in 2012. In 2020, 52 children were partnered with a buddy dog. Buddy dogs are Guide Dogs-bred dogs which haven't qualified to become a guide dog.

=== Sighted Guiding Skills ===
Guide Dogs works with communities and companies to provide sighted guiding skills. The organization also provides sighted guiding training to the family and friends of a person who is blind or partially sighted. By doing so, these sessions help teach people how to safely and confidently guide someone with visual impairments when it comes to everyday situations.

=== Children and Young People's Services ===
Aside from its adult mobility provision, The Guide Dogs for the Blind Association operates several specialised programmes targeted at visually impaired children, young people, and their families. These include:

My Time to Play, having been introduced in 2020, this early-intervention scheme provides online and face-to-face group sessions for children aged 0 to 4. The programme focuses on child development through play while facilitating peer support networks for parents and families.

Tech for All, which was piloted in 2021, the Guide Dogs project provides a free iPhone or iPad to children and young people between the ages of 3 to 18 who are affected with a visual impairment. The project was launched and based on the charity's research that had found that technology is an essential tool for people who are blind or visually impaired to learn and be independent.

== Campaigning ==
The charity's campaigning work covers a range of issues, including making sure children with sight loss are able to access the services they need, and ensuring public transport and streets are as accessible as possible. The charity is assisted by 28,000 volunteer campaigners who sign petitions, share social media posts, write to their MPs and collect signatures on the charity's behalf.

Throughout the recent years, the organization has also expanded its advocacy work through submissions of evidence to UK Parliament committees covering issues such as active travel, getting access to services for those who are disabled, and challenges faced by charities.

The dangers of pavement parking have also raised concerns in public campaigns, highlighting how blocked pavements can force those who are blind or visually impaired into the road. The organization has pushed for more clear rules to keep pedestrians safe. These campaigns have brought national attention to safety problems faced by pedestrians who are blind and visually impaired.

Along with its work with Parliament, the organization also runs public awareness campaigns that encourage local councils and communities to keep walking areas safe and make public spaces more accessible for those who are affected by sight loss.

The organization utilizes both direct and indirect lobbying when it comes to their advocacy work. Direct lobbying happens when the charity sends evidence to Parliament, whereas indirect lobbying includes its public campaigns that teach communities and influence the public opinion. As Nownes (2023) expresses, indirect lobbying focuses on shaping people's views, whereas direct lobbying focuses on working with policymakers.

== Research ==
The charity has a research programme to provide an evidence base for Guide Dogs' policies, operational procedures, and campaigns. The research is carried out internally and in collaboration with external organizations, helping the charity understand the needs of the people it supports and improving the care of its dogs. The research also assists guide the charity's advocacy work by providing them data to share with Parliament and local councils when discussing accessibility and safety issues.

The charity has two priority research areas:

- Canine Science – to support the behavior, health and wellbeing of the charity's dogs.
- Human Behavioral Sciences – to support the emotional wellbeing of service users, plus their family and friends.

In 2020, Guide Dogs began a research project called Born to Guide, which is a long-term study into the relationship between a dog's genetics, health, and behavior. The charity hopes Born to Guide will provide new insights into breeding future generations of guide dogs, with the goal of raising the percentage of pups who go on to become guide dogs. The project is also utilized to help improve training methods and reduce the number of dogs that are unable to qualify for service.

== History and Trivia ==
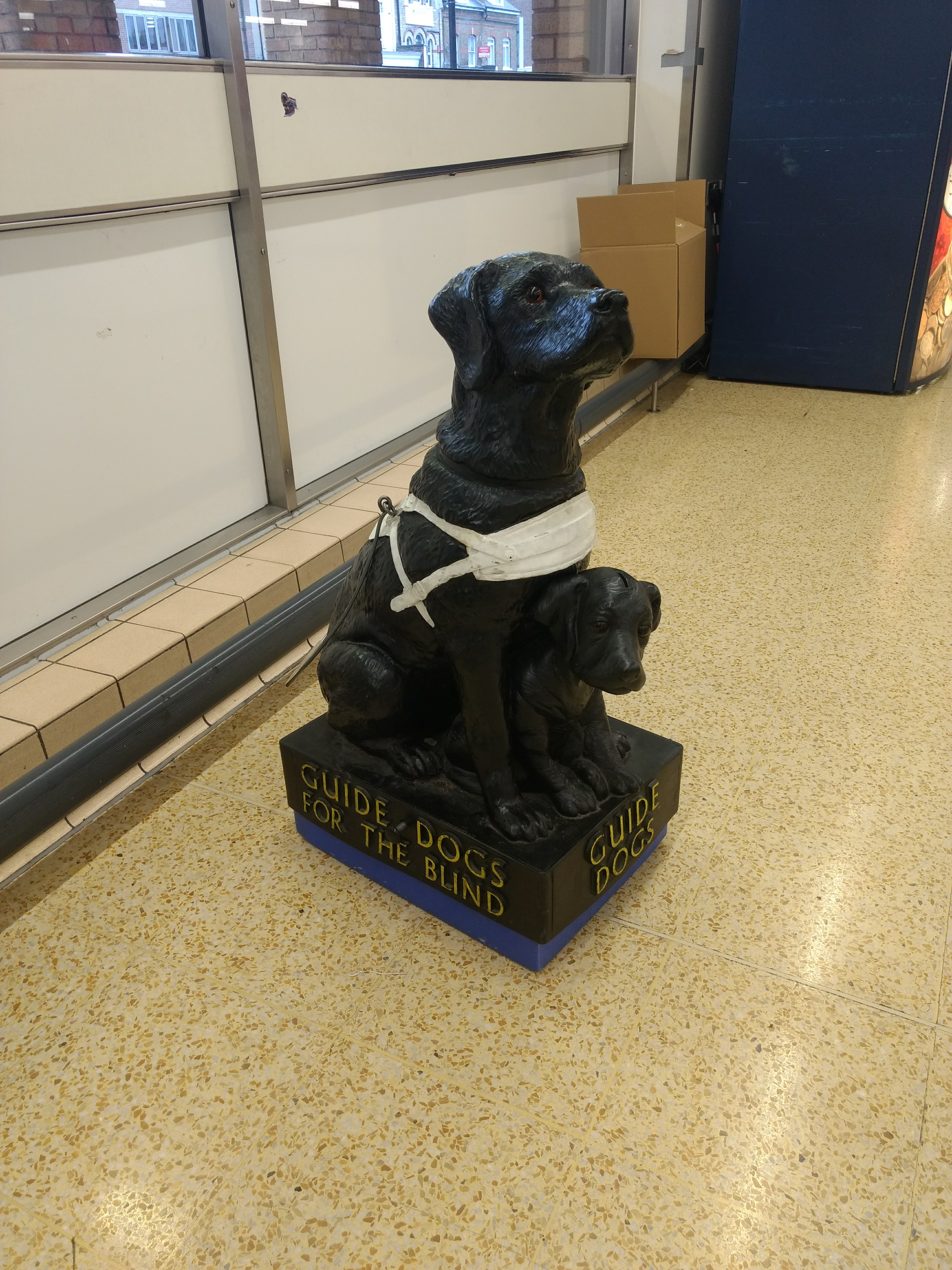
Collecting model, London, 2017.

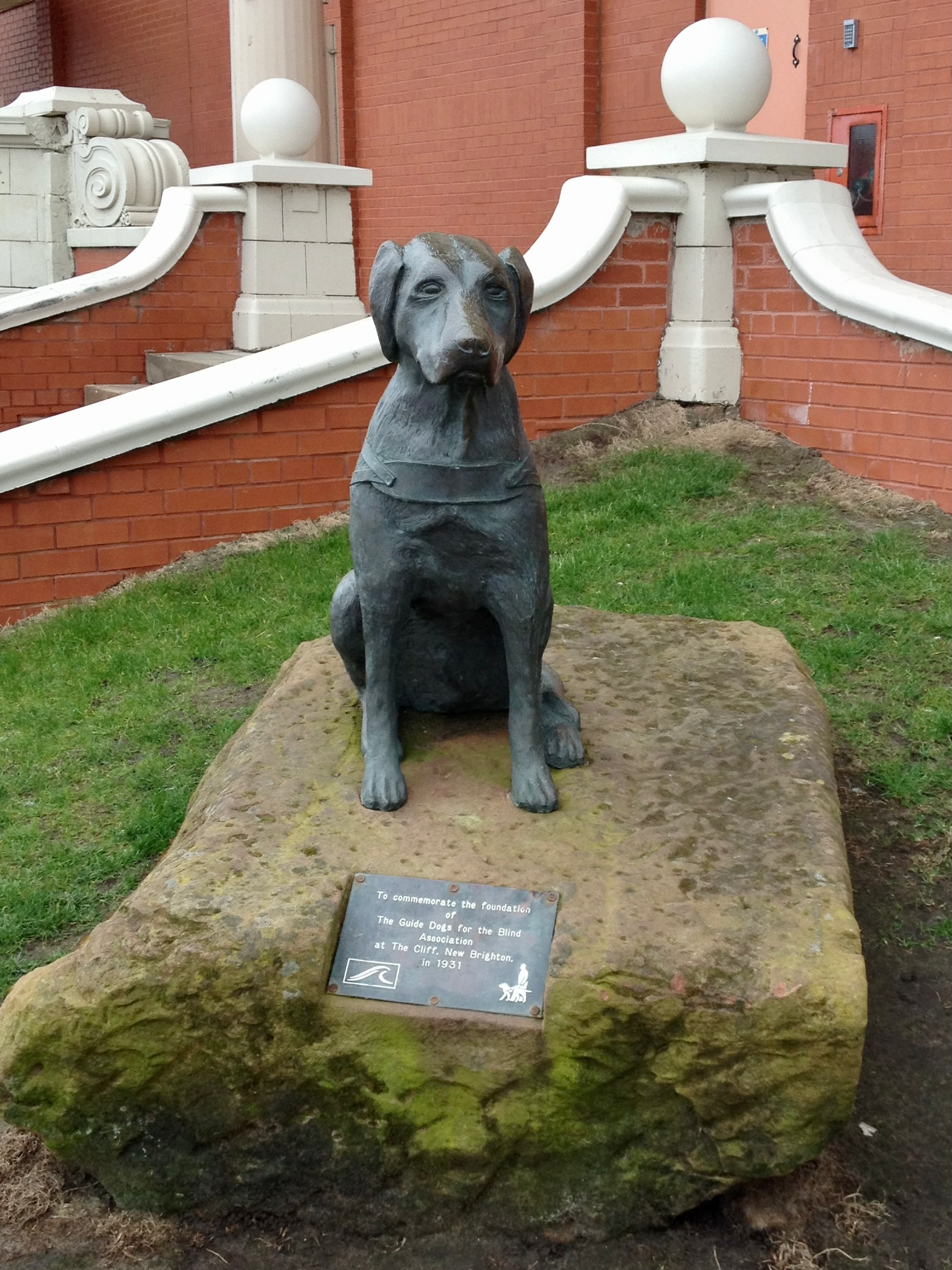
Statue to commemorate the foundation of the Guide Dogs for the Blind Association at The Cliff, New Brighton, in 1931

The first four British guide dogs – Judy, Flash, Folly and Meta – completed their training with Muriel Crooke and Rosamund Bond at Wallasey, Wirral on 6 October 1931, and three years after this the Guide Dogs for the Blind Association was formed. The first permanent trainer for Guide Dogs was Nikolai Liakhoff, who came to England in 1933. In 1941, the organisation's premises at The Cliff in Wallasey was commandeered for war purposes and Guide Dogs moved to new premises in the Midlands at Leamington Spa.

In 1956, Guide Dogs began to recruit volunteers to become puppy walkers. A few years later, a breeding programme was introduced and by 1970, these components of Guide Dogs' work had grown so much they were given their own premises at Tollgate House, near Leamington Spa. The most influential figure in the development of Guide Dogs' puppy walking and breeding programmes was Derek Freeman.

In 1964, the children's television programme Blue Peter followed the training of two guide dog puppies, Cindy and Honey. This feature has been repeated in the early 1980s, in 2006 with Andy Akinwolere with a puppy named Magic and in 2014 with another puppy, Iggy.

Guide Dogs holds the Guinness World Record for the largest number of guide dogs trained by an organization, which stood at 33,910 in 2016. The charity also holds a world record for the Largest Virtual Tea Party, achieved in April 2020 when thousands of people posted a photo of themselves enjoying a cup of tea at home on Guide Dogs' Facebook page.

In 2021, the charity celebrated the 90th anniversary of the UK's first four guide dog partnerships with a host of activities including an artisan sensory garden at the RHS Chelsea Flower Show.

== Travel ==
After the implementation of Brexit, the rules regarding guide dogs travelling throughout the UK were changed, with guide dogs travelling to Northern Ireland needing extra paperwork and vaccines; this raised difficulty for adult dogs and for puppies due to go into training. At the end of 2023, guide dogs were subject to the same paperwork as pets. and those travelling to the European Union could no longer use an EU Pet Passport issued in the UK.

== See also ==
- List of Guide Dog Schools
- Bradbury Fields – fellow members of the Merseyside Forum for Local Providers
