= Derek Freeman (dog breeder) =

Dog breeder with the Guide Dogs for the Blind Association

Derek Freeman MBE
- Born: c. 1926
- Died: 20 September 1991
- Occupation: Dog breeder
- Known for: Work with the Guide Dogs for the Blind Association

Derek Freeman MBE (c. 1926 – 20 September 1991) was a British dog breeder famed for his work with the UK charity, Guide Dogs for the Blind Association, which he joined in 1959. He reared over 20,000 puppies and also regularly appeared on Blue Peter.
