= Morris Frank =

Founder of The Seeing Eye

Morris Frank (March 23, 1908 – November 22, 1980) was a co-founder of The Seeing Eye, the first guide-dog school in the United States. He traveled the United States and Canada to promote the use of guide dogs for people who are blind or visually impaired, as well as the right of people with guide dogs to access restaurants, hotels, transportation, and other places that are open to the general public.

== Early life ==
Frank was born in Nashville, Tennessee, as the third and youngest son of wealthy Jewish parents, John Frank and Jessie Hirsch Frank. Throughout his childhood, Frank had been the guide and helper for his mother, who was blind. At age six, he went blind in his right eye after hitting an overhanging tree branch while horseback riding; at age sixteen, he went blind in the other eye while boxing with a friend. (In a bizarre coincidence, his mother's blindness was also caused by two unrelated accidents: she went blind in one eye when delivering her first son, and in the other fifteen years later when she was thrown from a horse.)

Frank graduated from Montgomery Bell Academy, then attended Vanderbilt University while working as an insurance salesman. He hired young men to serve as guides, but found them to be unreliable.

== Guide dogs ==
On November 5, 1927, The Saturday Evening Post published an article by Dorothy Harrison Eustis, an American dog trainer living in Switzerland. The article, titled "The Seeing Eye", was Eustis's first-hand account about a school in Germany where blinded World War I veterans were being trained to work with guide dogs. Frank was one of many people who wrote to her asking where he could get such a dog.

Frank not only asked for information about the school in Germany, but also about trainers in the U.S., and said he "would like to forward this work in this country".

On February 9, 1928, Eustis called Frank and asked him if he would come to her dog-training school in Switzerland, called Fortunate Fields, to be paired with a guide dog. Frank replied, "Mrs. Eustis, to get my independence back, I'd go to hell."

== Buddy ==
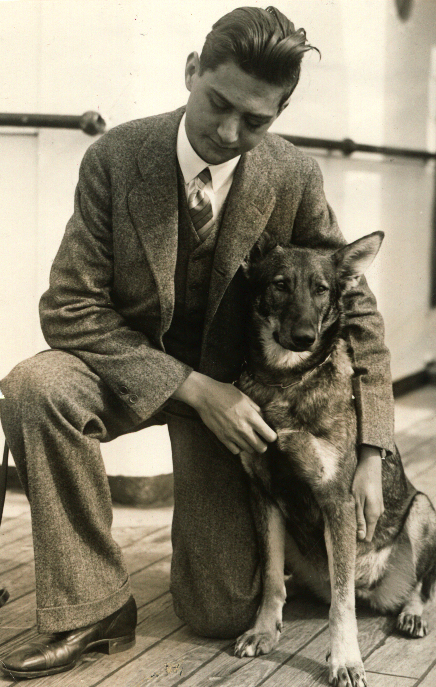
Morris Frank returning to Nashville from Vevey, Switzerland with his guide dog, Buddy.

At Fortunate Fields, Frank was partnered with a female German Shepherd named Kiss – whom he promptly renamed Buddy. He was trained in how to work with Buddy by Elliot "Jack" Humphrey, a self-taught animal trainer and dog breeder who worked for Eustis, at Fortunate Fields and on the streets of nearby Vevey. Frank returned to New York City with Buddy on June 11, 1928, and immediately began telling reporters about how he could now travel independently with his guide dog. Frank demonstrated Buddy's abilities to the media by crossing West Street, a particularly dangerous waterfront street, and later on Broadway during the evening rush. His one-word telegram to Eustis summed up his experience: "Success".

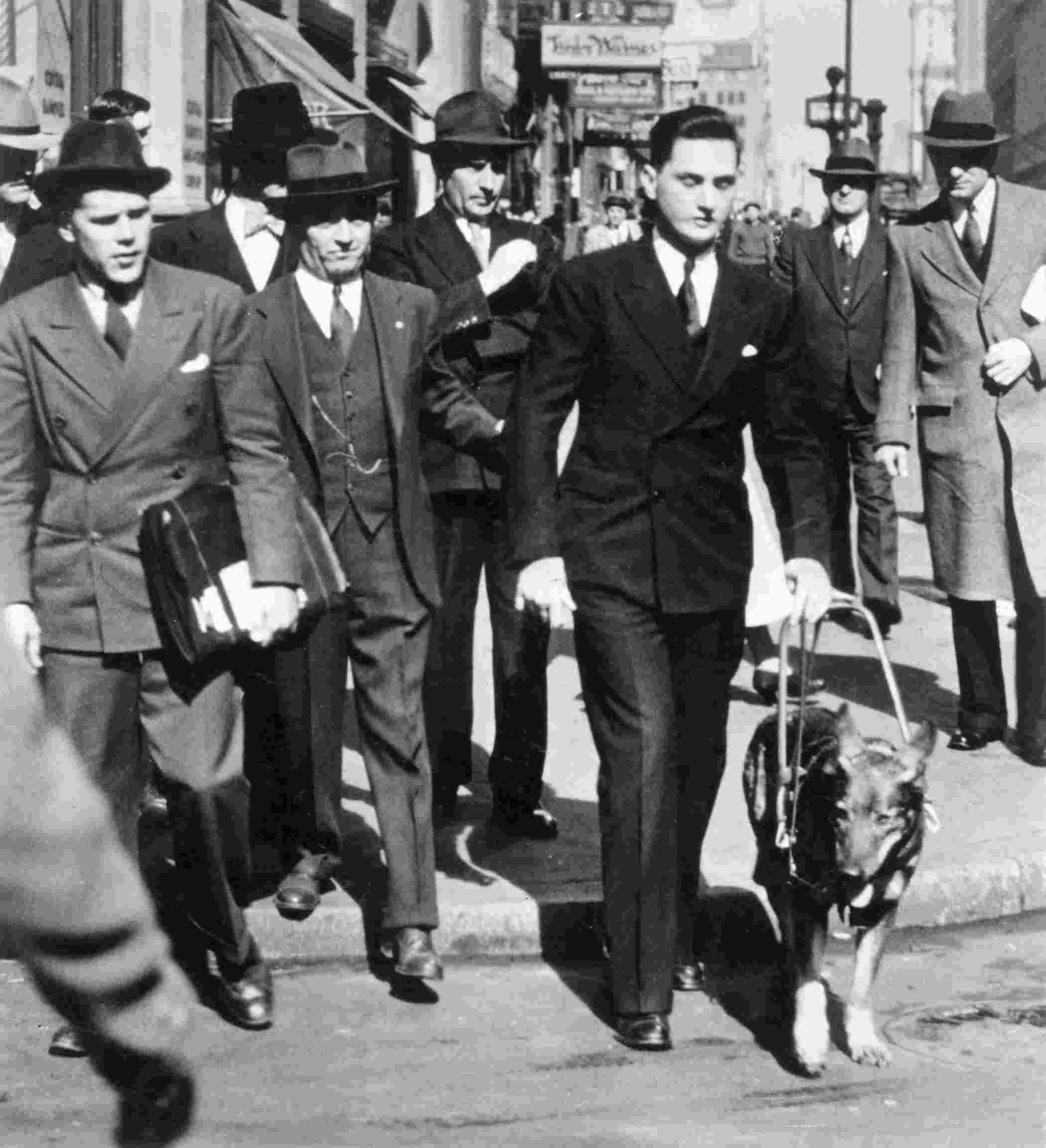
Morris Frank crossing a busy New York street with his guide dog, Buddy, in 1928

Frank worked with Buddy until her death on May 23, 1938; he named her replacement Buddy, as he would all his subsequent guide dogs.

== The Seeing Eye ==
Frank and Eustis then set about creating a guide-dog training school in the United States, and on January 29, 1929, The Seeing Eye was incorporated in Nashville, becoming the first guide-dog school in the United States. Two years later, the school moved to Whippany, New Jersey, and in 1965 to its current location in Morristown, New Jersey.

Between 1928 and 1956, Frank, as The Seeing Eye's vice president, traveled throughout the United States and Canada, spreading the word about The Seeing Eye and the need for equal access laws for people with guide dogs. He met with U.S. President Herbert Hoover in 1930 and with U.S. President Harry Truman in 1949. Between 1954 and 1956 alone, Frank met with 300 ophthalmologists and met with Seeing Eye graduates in all 48 states and throughout Canada.

Frank constantly championed for the right to be accompanied by his guide dog. In 1928, Frank was routinely told that Buddy could not ride in the passenger compartment with him; by 1935, all railroads in the United States had adopted policies specifically allowing guide dogs to remain with their owners on trains, and by 1939, The Seeing Eye informed the American Hotel Association that the number of hotels that banned guide dogs from the premises was small and "growing smaller constantly". By 1956, every state in the country had passed laws guaranteeing blind people with guide dogs access to public spaces.

Frank retired from The Seeing Eye in 1956, at age 48, to found his own insurance agency in Morristown.

He died aged 72 on November 22, 1980, at his home in the Brookside section of Mendham Township, New Jersey.

== Honors and awards ==
On April 29, 2005, a sculpture titled The Way to Independence was unveiled on Morristown Green in Morristown. The sculpture of Frank and Buddy, created by John Seward Johnson II, is made of bronze and painted in full color. It captures the pair in mid-stride, with Frank motioning his hand ahead as if he is giving Buddy the "forward" command.

A plaque near the original headquarters of The Seeing Eye in Nashville was dedicated in 2008; it reads, "Independence and Dignity Since 1929. The Seeing Eye, the world-famous dog guide training school, was incorporated in Nashville January 29, 1929, with headquarters in the Fourth and First National Bank Building at 315 Union St. Morris Frank, a 20-year-old blind man from Nashville, and his guide dog Buddy, played a key role in the school's founding and subsequent success. It was Frank who persuaded Dorothy Harrison Eustis to establish a school in the United States."

In 2010, Frank was posthumously inducted into the Hall of Fame: Leaders and Legends of the Blindness Field.

== In popular culture ==
Frank, along with co-author Blake Clark, wrote of his time with Buddy in the book First Lady of the Seeing Eye, published in 1957.

Frank's life story was told in the 1984 Walt Disney television film Love Leads the Way: A True Story. He was played by Timothy Bottoms.

William Mooney wrote and performed a one-man show about Frank's life, With a Dog's Eyes.

Kate Klimo wrote "Buddy", the second of a series of children's books called Dog Diaries. Buddy was published in 2013.

== Writings ==
- First Lady of the Seeing Eye, by Morris Frank and Blake Clark, Henry Holt, 1957.

== See also ==
- List of people from Nashville, Tennessee
- List of people from New Jersey
- List of Vanderbilt University people
