= Seeing Dogs Alliance =

English charity

The Seeing Dogs Alliance (Seeing Dogs) is an English unincorporated charity located in Send, Woking, Surrey. Established in 1979, Seeing Dogs rears, trains, and places guide dogs to assist people who are blind or partially sighted.
