= Fred Corcoran =

- Born: April 4, 1905; Cambridge, Massachusetts, US
- Died: June 23, 1977 (aged 72); White Plains, New York, US
- Other names: Mr. Golf
- Occupation(s): Golf administrator, business manager
- Known for: One of the leading golf administrators of the 20th Century, World Golf Hall of Fame member

Fred J. Corcoran (April 4, 1905 – June 23, 1977) was a golf tournament director, publicist, agent and business manager. Known around the world as "Mr. Golf," he was one of the first non-players to be inducted into the World Golf Hall of Fame. He acted as tournament manager of the PGA in the 1930s and promotion manager in the 1940s. He was also founder of the LPGA, the Golf Writers Association of America, and the Metropolitan Golf Writers Association. He was also a tournament director, however, working as the lead administrator of the Thunderbird Classic and Westchester Classic. He was also the director of the International Golf Association. In addition to golf, his diverse career also included the world of baseball, boxing, hockey, and football. At one time managed the business affairs of Sam Snead, Ted Williams, Babe Zaharias, Stan Musial, Tony Lema, Ken Venturi, Seve Ballesteros, Tom Weiskopf, and Pete Gogolak.

== Early life ==
In 1905, Corcoran was born in Cambridge, Massachusetts. He started in golf as a nine-year-old caddie at Belmont Country Club, carrying bags for Francis Ouimet and Alexa Stirling. At the age of 12, he became the youngest caddie master in America, collecting five cents from every boy who carried a bag.

As a young man he worked for the Massachusetts Golf Association, with Donald Ross at Pinehurst Resort, and as the official scorer for the United States Golf Association (USGA).

== Career ==
In 1936, he became the PGA Tour's tournament manager and the business manager of Sam Snead. During the 1940s, he took golf from a minor curiosity to a major business. He later served as the PGA's Promotions Director until 1948.

Both idea man and publicist, with a pinch of hustler thrown in, Corcoran raised the awareness and business of golf through many avenues. In 1940, he put together a charity match between Gene Tunney, Babe Ruth, Gene Sarazen and Jimmy Demaret, where he brought the Fred Waring band and "Colonel" Stoopnagel, of radio fame, to follow the match with a sound truck, offering an absurd commentary. A year later, he arranged for a three-course match between Ty Cobb and Babe Ruth, which allowed them to settle their long-term rivalry on the golf course. He established golf's first Hall of Fame that year as well. He managed three United States Ryder Cup teams, and was official scorer at 34 USGA championships. During World War II, Corcoran worked for the Red Cross and USO, staging golf exhibitions with the help of Bing Crosby and Bob Hope, and bringing sports shows to the troops with Lefty Gomez and Jack Sharkey.

Among his innovations was the first tournament leaderboard that reflected birdies, pars and bogies, marked in different colored crayons, a method that caught on immediately and is used around the world today.

From the mid-1930s to the late 1940s, there was some friction and dispute on the PGA Tour over Corcoran's perceived conflict of interest as a personal manager of certain tour players at the same time he was promoting and running tournaments where those players competed against others. There was also controversy over how Corcoran should be paid for his services to the Tour, and expenses incurred doing his jobs; the Tour was at the time still a loosely run, evolving branch of the PGA of America, with little structure or assigned responsibilities and chain of command for the weekly tournaments around the large country. Few disputed Corcoran's skills and worth, but budgets were tight and prize moneys low in the wake of the Great Depression, and professional golf in the USA was but a shadow of what it would become decades later. Corcoran was fired and re-hired several times during this period, but took the conflict in stride, and emerged with his reputation intact.

After World War II, Corcoran helped found the Ladies Professional Golf Association and the Golf Writers Association of America (GWAA). He was well known for providing anecdotes, quotes, and stats to golf writers from a file cabinet inside his head. He worked at the Tournament Director of the LPGA from 1950 to 1954. He also managed the career of Babe Zaharias, entering her into the 1945 Los Angeles Open as the first woman to play a PGA Tour event. He managed golf star Marlene Bauer Hagge, and baseball superstars Ted Williams and Stan Musial.

Corcoran's own modest, self-described claim to fame is that he three-putted in 48 counties. In 1955, Corcoran took over the ailing Canada Cup, which traveled the globe to promote international goodwill through golf with team and individual championships. The Canada Cup became the World Cup and was played under Corcoran's direction until his death in 1977. The World Cup introduced to the world such international stars as Seve Ballesteros, Greg Norman, Gary Player and Roberto De Vicenzo; it was supported during this period by the top American stars such as Sam Snead, Arnold Palmer, Jack Nicklaus, and Lee Trevino, who traveled the world to compete in it. The World Cup became a significant championship, and had an invaluable role in broadening golf's international profile and appeal.

Corcoran also worked as Tournament Director for the Thunderbird Classic and the Westchester Classic golf tournaments, which were at the time, the richest in golf. He managed the business of "Champagne" Tony Lema, Ken Venturi, and Tom Weiskopf. He orchestrated the move from the AFL to the NFL by New York Giant placekicker, Pete Gogolak.

== Personal life ==
In 1977, Corcoran died in White Plains, New York. He died form complications of a stroke suffered days earlier at his home in Scarsdale, New York.

== Awards and honors ==
- In 1960, Corcoran won the William D. Richardson Award.
- In 1975, he was inducted into the World Golf Hall of Fame in the lifetime achievement category. Corcoran was the first non-golfer inducted.
- In 2002, he also was inducted into the Massachusetts Golf Hall of Fame.
- Corcoran is honored annually with the Corcoran Cup, a golf tournament featuring the nation's top blind golfers, to raise funds for Guiding Eyes for the Blind, an organization that trains dogs for the visually impaired.

== Bibliography ==
- 1964, Unplayable Lies, autobiography
  - His daughter, Judy, updated, reorganized and added to that book as: Fred Corcoran: The Man Who Sold the World on Golf in 2011
