= Dorothy Harrison Eustis =

American dog breeder

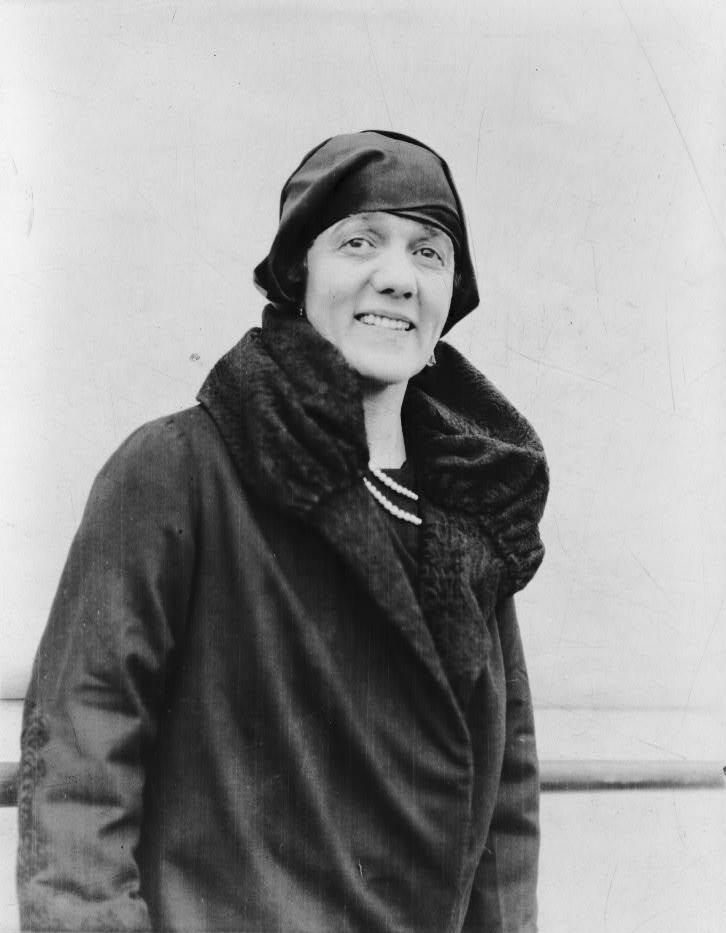
- Born: Dorothy Leib Harrison; May 30, 1886; Philadelphia, Pennsylvania, US
- Died: September 8, 1946 (aged 60); New York, NY
- Organization: The Seeing Eye
- Spouse(s): Walter Abbott Wood Jr. (died 1915); George Morris Eustis (divorced 1928)
- Children: Walter Abbott Wood III and Harrison Wood

Dorothy Leib Harrison Wood Eustis (May 30, 1886 – September 8, 1946) was an American dog breeder and philanthropist, who founded The Seeing Eye, the first dog guide school for the blind in the United States. She was inducted into the National Women's Hall of Fame in 2011.

In 1927, Eustis was 41 years old and living in Switzerland where she bred German Shepherds as police dogs when she wrote an article for The Saturday Evening Post, a popular weekly magazine. The piece described a German dog guide training school for blind veterans of the First World War and sparked a flood of mail, including a letter from a 20-year-old blind man named Morris Frank who promised to help set up a similar school in the United States if Eustis would train him to use a dog guide. Eustis invited Frank to Switzerland, where he spent five weeks learning to work with Buddy, the first of his six dog guides (all named Buddy). A year later, in December 1928, Eustis and Frank launched The Seeing Eye in Frank’s hometown of Nashville, Tennessee.

Eustis’ legacy has been long-lasting. Her work helped spawn dog guide schools in the United States and around the world, and also paved the way for using service animals to help people with various disabilities. Because The Seeing Eye refused to see its students as charity cases, Eustis is also credited with helping to change public attitudes toward disabled people and contributing to the disability rights movement that began in the 1970s.

== Early life and education ==
The sixth and youngest child of businessman and philanthropist Charles Custis Harrison and his wife Ellen Nixon Waln Harrison, Eustis grew up in a prominent Philadelphia family whose social circle included some of the most influential people of their day. Her father, Charles C. Harrison, was the grandson of John Harrison, who established the first chemical factory in the United States. Charles owned a highly profitable sugar refinery, which he and his partners sold for a reported price of $10 million. He then became the provost at his alma mater, the University of Pennsylvania, and raised an estimated $11 million for the university over 16 years.

Eustis’s mother was the great-granddaughter of Robert Morris, who helped fund the American Revolution and the great-great-granddaughter of John Nixon, who was chosen to do the public reading of The Declaration of Independence in Philadelphia four days after it was signed. Ellen Harrison was also active at the University of Pennsylvania, raising money for the university hospital and overseeing the landscaping of the university grounds.

Eustis attended the Agnes Irwin School, a private girls' school in Philadelphia from the fall of 1901 through the spring 1903, and then attended the Rathgowrie School in England.

== Personal life ==
Eustis married her first husband, Walter Abbott Wood Jr., the wealthy son of a farm machinery manufacturer, on Oct. 6, 1906 in Old St. David’s Church in St. David’s, Pa. and then moved to her husband’s hometown of Hoosick Falls, New York, a small community just ten miles south of the Vermont border. The couple had two children: Walter Abbott III (1907–1993) and Harrison (1914–1938).

During her years in Hoosick Falls, Eustis and her husband, a local politician, developed an experimental breeding program for cattle on their farm. In 1914, during a trip to Europe with her husband, Eustis acquired her first German Shepherd, a dog named Hans. The dog later proved to be part of the inspiration for The Seeing Eye. As Willi Ebeling, who worked closely with Eustis to get The Seeing Eye off the ground and served as the organization’s executive vice president for many years, explained: "The first half of his [Han's] life was spent bringing his owners to the realization of what a wonderful dog the old-fashioned German Shepherd really was. The last half of his life was spent watching his owners attempt to regain the old over the present day breed; (sic) to find and retain the working temperament and the usefulness that was present in the breed before the great war (World War I)".

== Widowhood and remarriage ==
A turning point in Eustis' life came Oct. 8, 1915, when husband Walter died of complications from typhoid fever, making her a 29-year-old widow with two young children, ages 1 and 8. She returned to Philadelphia in 1917, and married a second time on June 23, 1923, this time to George Eustis, a polo player 13 years her junior and the stepson of the pianist Josef Hofmann.

Shortly after their wedding, the couple began renting Hofmann’s chalet on Mt. Pèlerin in the Swiss Alps and started breeding German shepherds and training them to work as police dogs. To help them with their project, they hired Elliot "Jack" Humphrey, a self-taught geneticist and animal trainer. Humphrey would later be instrumental in developing the method for training dogs, as well as students, at The Seeing Eye.

== The Saturday Evening Post article ==
On November 5, 1927, The Saturday Evening Post published an article by Eustis about a school outside Berlin that trained guide dogs for German war veterans who had been blinded by mustard gas in World War I. Soon the publishing company was forwarding her piles of letters from readers who wanted to know more. One stood out from the rest. It was from Morris Frank, the young man from Nashville Tenn.

“Is what you say really true?’’ Frank wrote. “If so, I want one of those dogs! And I am not alone. Thousands of blind like me abhor being dependent on others. Help me and I will help them. Train me and I will bring back my dog and show people here how a blind man can be absolutely on his own. We can then set up an instruction center in this country to give all those here who want it a chance at a new life.’’ By the end of 1928, Eustis had divorced her second husband George and launched a new venture: The Seeing Eye.

== The Seeing Eye ==
For the first three years of its existence, The Seeing Eye had no permanent facility, so trainers traveled to different cities to hold their classes. That changed in 1931 when Eustis purchased a ten-bedroom mansion in Whippany, New Jersey that had enough room to house students while they were learning to work with their dogs. The school relocated to a newly constructed, and more user-friendly facility in Morristown in 1966.

Eustis continued to play an active role in the affairs of The Seeing Eye until 1940 when she resigned as president and took on the role of honorary president and a member of the board of trustees. By then she had also become increasingly more devoted to Christian Science, and had begun a Christian Science healing practice. (Although she grew up in the Episcopal Church, she became a Christian Scientist around 1926.) Eustis continued the practice until 1945, the year before she died.

Eustis died in her New York City home on September 8, 1946, aged 60.
