= Intelligent disobedience =

Service animals disobeying instructions to assist their handler

Intelligent disobedience occurs when a service animal trained to help a disabled person goes directly against the owner's instructions in an effort to make a better decision. This behavior is a part of the dog's training and is central to a service animal's success on the job. The concept of intelligent disobedience has been in use and a common part of service animals' training since at least 1936.

== Examples ==
When a blind person wishes to cross a street and issues an instruction to the assistance dog to do so, the dog should refuse to move when such an action would put the person in harm's way. The animal understands that this contradicts the learned behavior to respond to the owner's instructions: instead it makes an alternative decision because the human is not in a position to decide safely. The dog in this case has the capacity to understand that it is performing such an action for the welfare of the person.

In another example, a blind person must communicate with the animal in such a way that the animal can recognize that the person is aware of the surroundings and can safely proceed. If a blind person wishes to descend a staircase, an animal properly trained to exhibit intelligent disobedience will refuse to move unless the person issues a specific code word or command that lets the animal know the person is aware they are about to descend stairs. This command will be specific for staircases, and the animal will not attribute it to stepping off a curb or up onto a sidewalk or stoop. In a similar circumstance, if the person believes they are in front of a step and they wish to go down, but they are in fact standing in front of a dangerous precipice (for example, a loading dock or cliff), the animal will refuse to proceed.

== Application to other fields ==
Ira Chaleff suggests in his 2015 book Intelligent Disobedience: Doing Right When What You're Told to Do is Wrong that intelligent disobedience has a place in other important areas. One notable example is crew resource management, or CRM, where the flight crew of an aircraft is encouraged to bring anything that seems questionable about an order, or additional information, to the captain's attention, usually respectfully and tactfully, but if it is urgent enough, more strongly, just as the guide dogs do. He opens the book by mentioning how the idea came to him when he had a person who was training a guide dog in one of his classes. Besides CRM, the principle is applicable in almost every other field, such as medicine, engineering, and business.

Intelligent Disobedience has also found its place in Children's Rights Education offering instruments that help to keep children safe from the traumatic instances when authority figures abuse their power. One of these tools is the mnemonic Blink! Think! Choice! Voice! that works similar to the simple fire safety technique stop, drop and roll taught to children in several English-speaking countries.

== See also ==
- Salty and Roselle
- Dickin Medal
