= Guide dog =

Assistance dog trained to lead visually impaired around obstacles

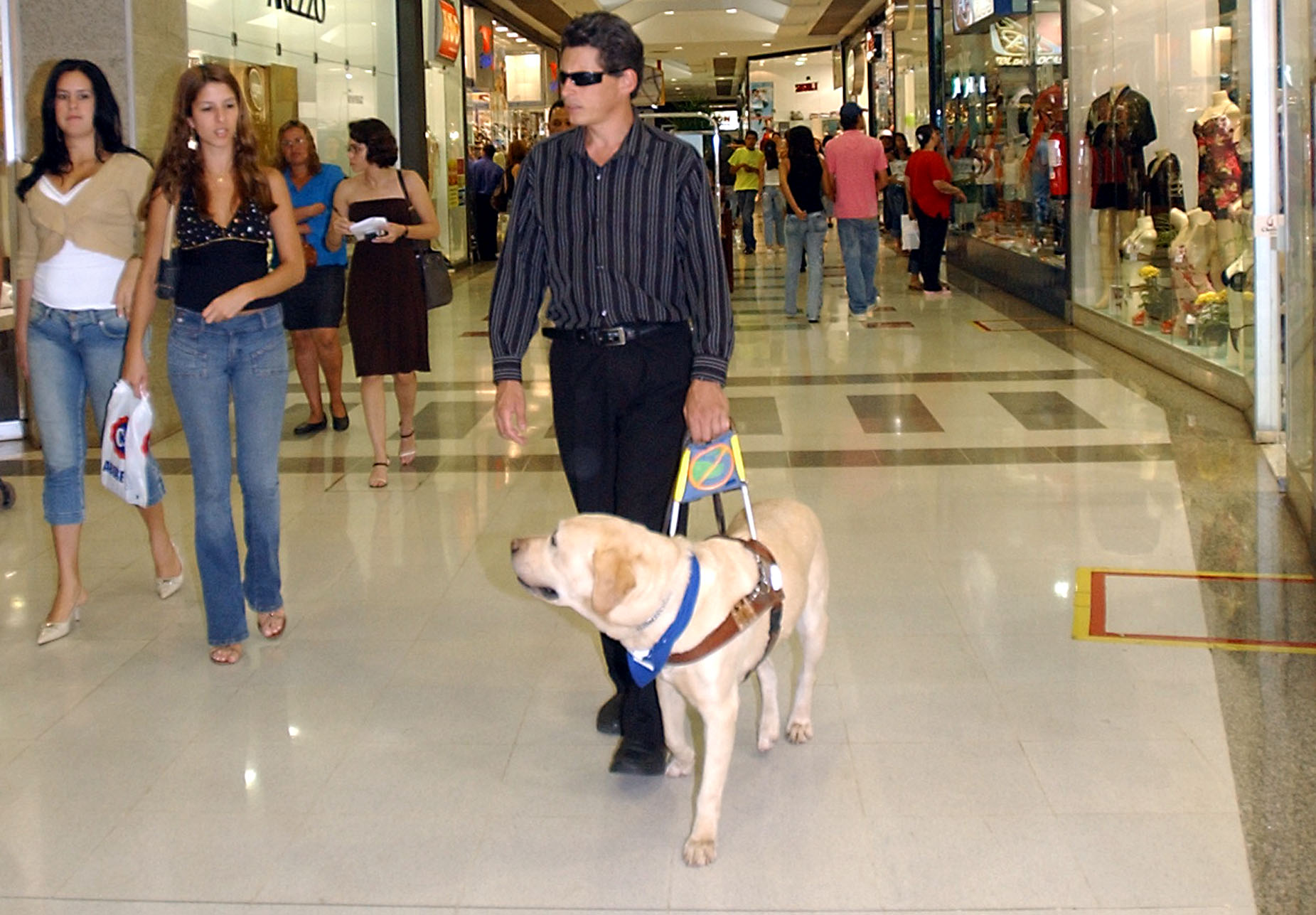
A blind man is led by his guide dog in Brasília, Brazil.

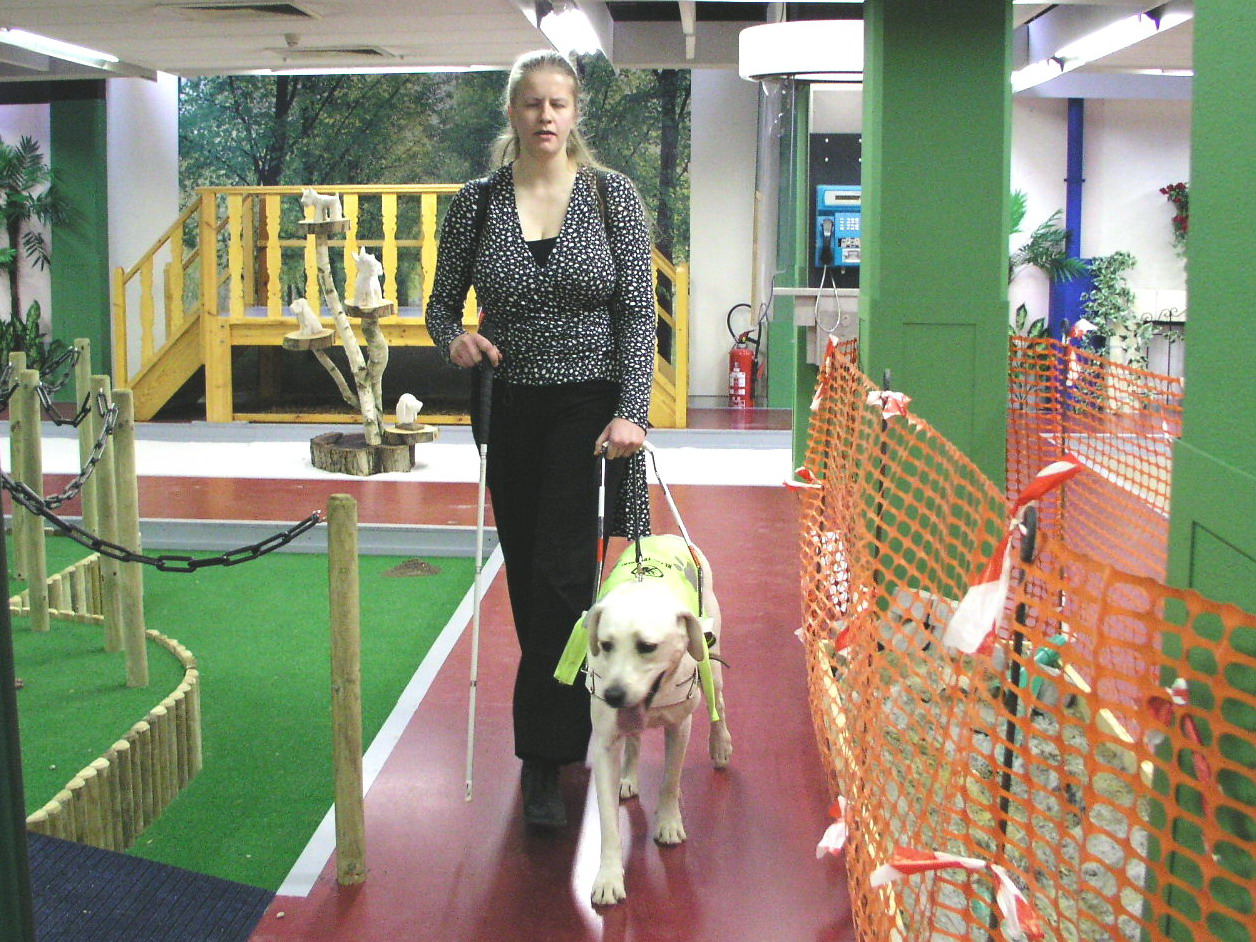
A blind woman learns to use her guide dog in a test environment.

Guide dogs (colloquially known in the US as seeing-eye dogs) are assistance dogs trained to lead people who are blind or visually impaired around obstacles. Although dogs can be trained to navigate various obstacles, they are red–green colour blind and incapable of interpreting street signs. The human does the directing, based on skills acquired through previous mobility training. The handler might be likened to an aircraft's navigator, who must know how to get from one place to another, and the dog is the pilot, who gets them there safely. In several countries guide dogs, along with most other service and hearing dogs, are exempt from regulations against the presence of animals in places such as restaurants and public transportation.

== History ==
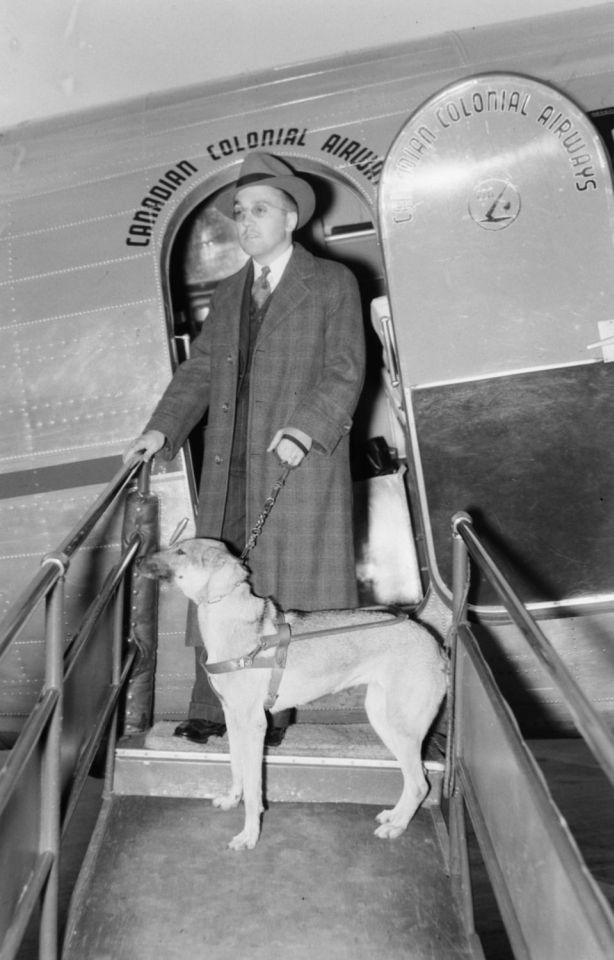
A blind man with his guide dog in Montreal, 1941

So far, the most ancient written reference to guide dogs yet dates back to the year 1247. Thomas of Celano quotes Saint Francis of Assisi as saying, "I saw at one time – he added – a blind man who in a path was led by a little she-dog." [Guerra, J. A. (ed.) San Francisco de Asís. Escritos. Biografías. Documentos de la época. Madrid. Biblioteca de Autores Cristianos. 144.] Other references to service animals date at least as far back as the mid-16th century. The second line of the popular verse alphabet "A was an Archer" is most commonly "B was a Blind-man/Led by a dog". In Elizabeth Barrett Browning's 19th-century verse novel Aurora Leigh, the title character remarks, "The blind man walks wherever the dog pulls / And so I answered." Guide dogs are also mentioned in Charles Dickens' A Christmas Carol: "Even the blind men's dogs appeared to know him; and when they saw him coming on, would tug their owners into doorways and up courts; and then would wag their tails as though they said, 'No eye at all is better than an evil eye, dark master!'"

Evidence suggests that dogs may have been used as guides for the visually impaired based on depictions of a blind-man being guided by his dog on the wall of a house in Herculaneum, buried when Vesuvius erupted in 79 CE. This and other visual depictions indicate that dogs have been common companions for the blind for thousands of years. Additional material evidence would be required to positively assess their use specifically as guides.

The first service dog training schools were established in Germany during World War I, to enhance the mobility of returning veterans who were blinded in combat. Interest in service animals outside of Germany did not become widespread until Dorothy Harrison Eustis, an American dog breeder living in Switzerland, wrote a first-hand account about a service animal training school in Potsdam, Germany, that was published in The Saturday Evening Post in 1927. That same year, United States Senator Thomas D. Schall of Minnesota was paired with a service animal imported from Germany, who was trained by the owner of LaSalle Kennels, Jack Sinykin of Minnesota.

The service animal movement did not take hold in America until Nashville resident Morris Frank returned from Switzerland after being trained with one of Eustis's dogs, a female German shepherd named Buddy. Frank and Buddy embarked on a publicity tour to convince Americans of the abilities of service animals and the need to allow people with service animals access to public transportation, hotels, and other areas open to the public. In 1929, Eustis and Frank co-founded The Seeing Eye school in Nashville, Tennessee (relocated in 1931 to New Jersey).

The first service animals in Great Britain were German Shepherds. Four of these first were Flash, Judy, Meta, and Folly, who were handed over to their new owners, veterans blinded in World War I, on 6 October 1931 in Wallasey, Merseyside. Judy's new owner was Musgrave Frankland. In 1934, The Guide Dogs for the Blind Association in Great Britain began operation, although their first permanent trainer was a Russian military officer, Captain Nikolai Liakhoff, who moved to the UK in 1933.

Elliott S. Humphrey was an animal breeder who trained the first guide dogs for the blind used in the United States. Humphrey was hired to breed German shepherds at a centre in Switzerland that had been set up by Dorothy Harrison Eustis of Philadelphia and began the work that led to the Seeing-Eye Dog program.

The first dogs produced at the centre, known as Fortunate Fields, were used for military and police work and for tracking missing persons. Then Humphrey trained German shepherds to guide the blind.

The Germans had developed a guide dog program during World War I, but Mr. Humphrey devised different procedures and it is his that are followed in the United States.

== Research ==
Important studies on the behaviour and training methods of service animals were done in the 1920s and 1930s by Jakob von Uexküll and Emanuel Georg Sarris. They studied the value of service animals and introduced advanced methods of training. There have also been important studies into the discrimination experienced by people that use service and assistance animals.

== Breeds ==
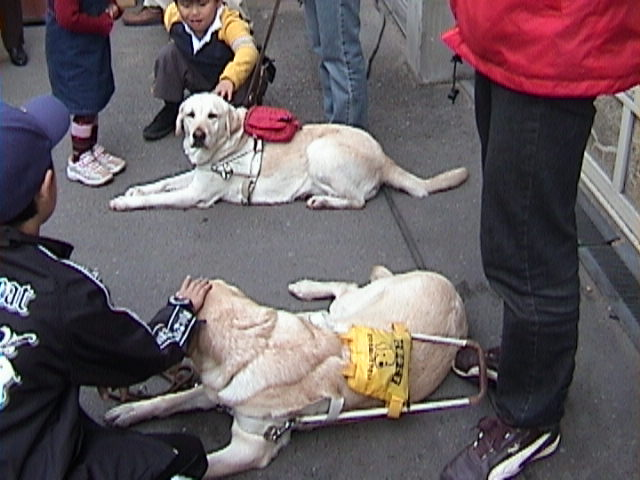
Labrador Retriever guide dogs resting

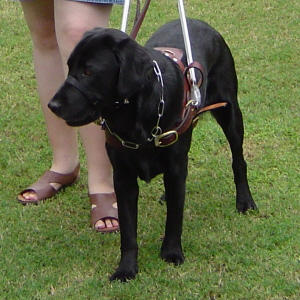
Labrador guide dog standing with its handler

Guide dog breeds are chosen for temperament and trainability. At the moment Golden Retrievers, Labradors, Standard Poodles, German Shepherds, and Golden Retriever/Labrador crosses are most likely to be chosen by service animal facilities.

The most popular breed used globally today is the Labrador Retriever. This breed has a good range of size, is easily kept due to its short coat, is generally healthy and has a gentle but willing temperament. Crosses such as the Goldador (Golden Retriever/Labrador), combine the sensitivity of the Golden Retriever and the tolerance of the Labrador Retriever. Also common are Labradoodles, i.e., Labrador/Poodles, are bred to help reduce allergens as all breeds shed but levels vary.

Some schools, such as the Guide Dog Foundation, have added Standard Poodles to their breed registry. Although German Shepherds were once a common breed used for guide work, many schools have discontinued using these dogs due to the skills and unwavering leadership role required by the handler to keep the breed active and non-destructive.

== Accessibility ==
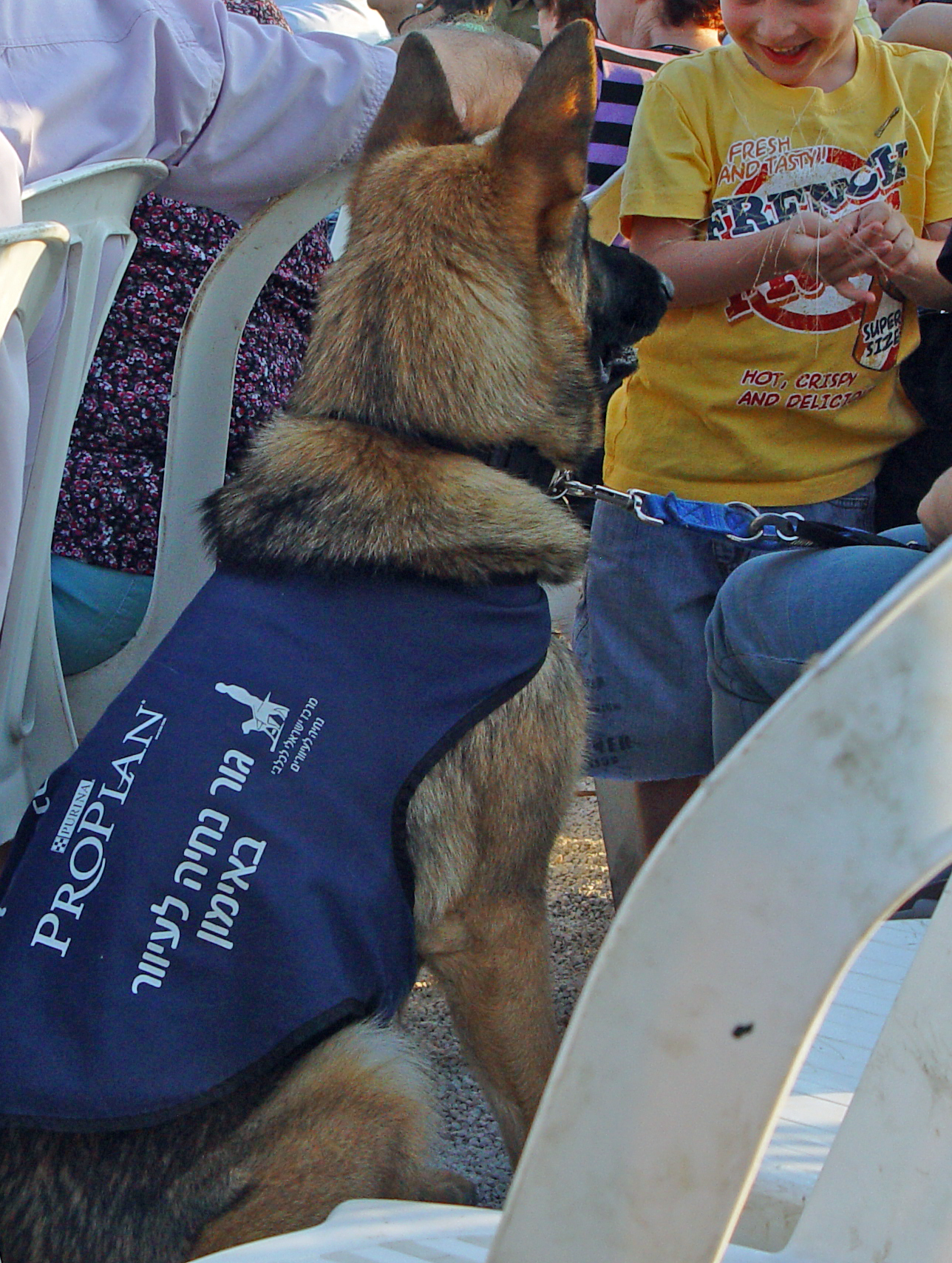
A guide dog-in-training.

Despite regulations or rules that deny access to animals in restaurants and other public places, in many countries, service animals are protected by law and therefore may accompany their handlers most places that are open to the public. Laws and regulations vary worldwide:

- In the United States, the Americans with Disabilities Act prohibits any business, government agency, or other organization that provides access to the general public from barring service animals, except where their presence would cause a health or safety risk. However, religious organizations are not required to provide such access. Whether service animals in training have the same rights or not usually falls on each individual state government. Surprisingly, the ADA stipulates the Veterans Hospitals system does not have to follow these laws and can refuse admittance to military vets with service animals. In addition, the Fair Housing Act requires that landlords allow tenants to have service animals, as well as other types of assistance animals, in residences that normally have a No Pets policy and that no extra fees may be charged for such tenants. The U.S. Department of Housing and Urban Development's Office of Fair Housing and Equal Opportunity investigates complaints from the public alleging denials of reasonable accommodation requests involving assistance animals.
- In the United Kingdom the Equality Act 2010 (England, Scotland, Wales) and Disability Discrimination Act 1995 (Northern Ireland) provides for people with disabilities to have the same right to services supplied by shops, banks, hotels, libraries, pubs, taxis, and restaurants as everyone else. Service providers have to make "reasonable adjustments" to accommodate assistance dog owners. Under Part 12 of the EA and part 5 of the DDA, it is illegal for assistance dog owners to be refused access to a taxi or minicab with their assistance dog, but medical exemptions are available if drivers have a certificate from their GPs.
- In most South American countries and Mexico, service animal access depends solely upon the goodwill of the owner or manager. In more tourist-heavy areas, service animals are generally welcomed without problems. In Brazil, however, a 2006 federal decree requires allowance of service animals in all public and open-to-public places. The Federal District Metro has developed a program that trains service animals to ride it.
- In Malta, the Equal Opportunities Act 2000 (Cap. 413) states that it is illegal to discriminate against a disabled person who needs an assistant, in this case, a service animal. The few exceptions are restaurant kitchens, hospital special wards, toilets and premises where other animals are kept.
- In Australia, the Disability Discrimination Act 1992 protects service animals handlers. Each state and territory has its own laws, which may differ slightly.
- In Canada, service animals are allowed anywhere that the general public is allowed. Service Animal laws by province:
  - Alberta: Blind Persons' Rights Act, Service Dogs Act
  - British Columbia: Guide Animal Act
  - Manitoba: The Human Rights Code, The Service Animals Protection Act
  - New Brunswick: Human Rights Act
  - Newfoundland & Labrador: Blind Persons' Rights Act, Human Rights Act
  - Northwest Territories: Human Rights Act
  - Nova Scotia: Blind Persons' Rights Act, Human Rights Act
  - Nunavut: Human Rights Act
  - Ontario: Blind Persons' Rights Act, Accessibility for Ontarians with Disabilities Act, Human Rights Code
  - Prince Edward Island: Human Rights Act
  - Quebec: Individuals with Disabilities Act, Charter of Human Rights and Freedoms
  - Saskatchewan: Human Rights Code
  - Yukon: Human Rights Act
- In South Korea, it is illegal to deny access to service animals in any areas that are open to the public. Violators are fined no more than 2 million Korean Won.
- In Portugal, service animals are allowed anywhere that the general public is allowed. The Law - Decreto-Lei n.74/2007 - Establish their rights.
- In Switzerland, service animals are allowed anywhere that the general public is allowed.
- In Russia, service animals are allowed anywhere that the general public is allowed. Guide dogs are exempt from the fare charges in public transportation.

== Discrimination ==
Since schools of thought in Islam consider dogs in general to be unclean, Muslim taxi drivers and store owners have refused to accommodate customers who have service animals, which has led to discrimination charges against them. However, in 2003, the Islamic Sharia Council ruled that the ban on dogs does not apply to those used for guide work.

== Benefits of owning a guide dog ==
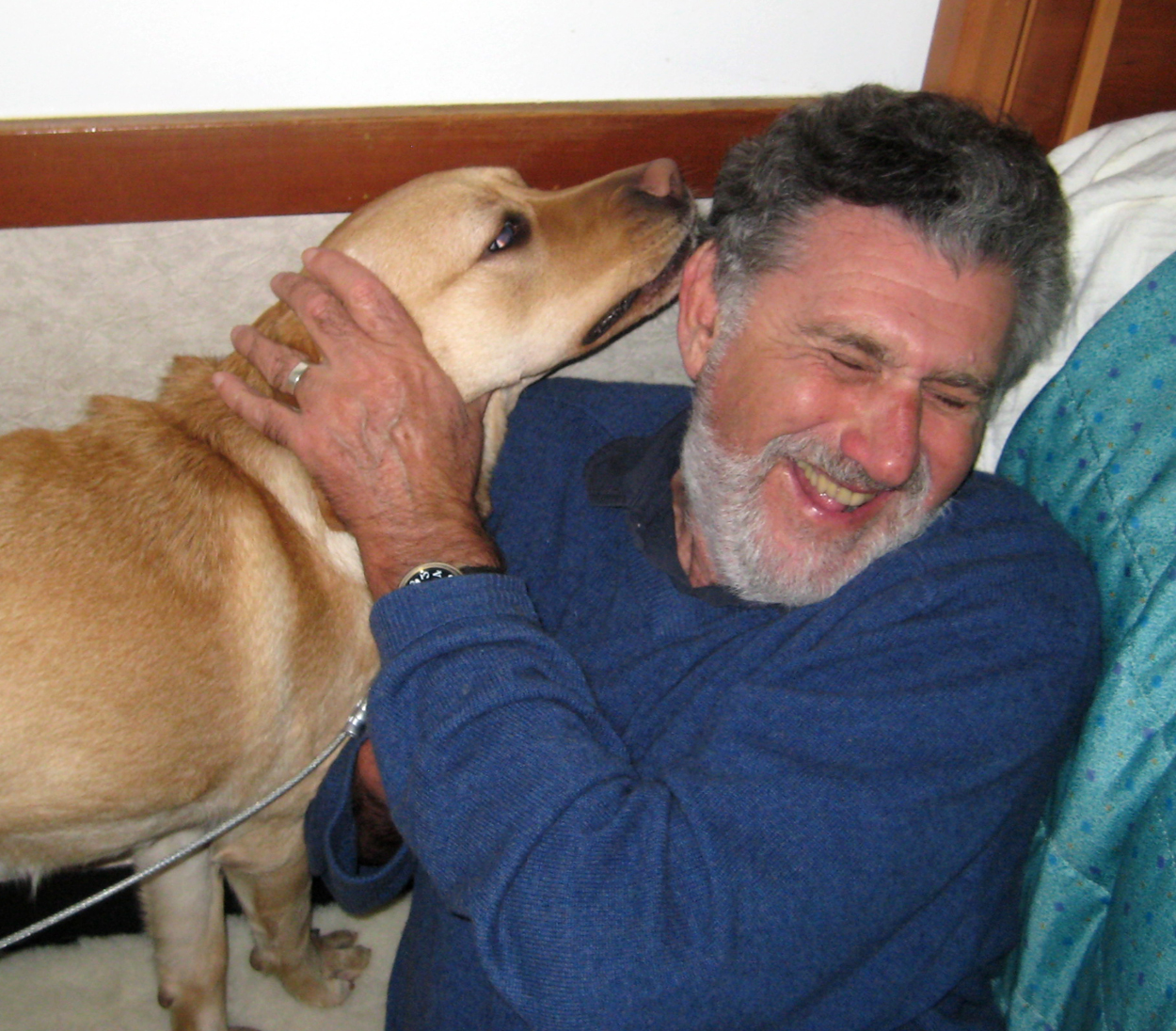
Social psychologist Elliot Aronson and his guide dog, Desilu, whom he received in January 2011

Studies show owning a pet or therapy animal offers beneficial effects psychologically, socially, and physiologically, and guide dogs are no exception. Some blind people report experiencing increased levels of confidence, a greater sense of security, and a cherished friendship from owning guide dogs. Some also state that owning a guide dog has encouraged them to exercise more, especially by walking. This is attributed to a willingness to venture outdoors facilitated by a sense of independence. Some blind people claim meeting others and socializing is easier with a guide dog, and people are more likely to offer assistance when there is a service animal present. The animals may also lead to increased interactions with other people, providing an easy topic of conversation. Guide dogs may be more deliberate than the use of a long cane when leading their handlers in an unfamiliar place. The animal directs the right path, eliminating the trial and error users may experience with a cane. Some report that guide dogs make the experience of the unknown more relaxing. Many blind people using a guide dog report travel is much faster and safer.

Many owners of guide dogs report that they see the animal as a member of the family. Often, the handler goes to their animal for comfort and support. The animal is not seen as a working animal, but more as a loyal friend.

People often have misconceptions about guide dogs, including believing they work all the time. In reality, the dogs usually work only when their handler leaves their residence. The handler tells the dog where they want to go, and the dogs are taught intelligent disobedience—blocking the handler from proceeding when there is an unsafe situation.

== See also ==
- Emotional support animal – Animal that provides psychological relief
- Guide horse – Equine service animal assisting blind persons
- List of guide dog schools
- Service dog – Working dog trained to aid or assist an individual with a disability
- White cane – Distinctive cane used in walking by the blind
- Working dog – Dog trained to perform practical tasks
- Pet insurance
