= Rawdon Briggs Lee =

Rawdon Briggs Lee (9 July 1845 – 29 February 1908) was an English dog breeder and writer on dogs.

== Life ==
He was son of George Lee, unitarian minister at Kendal, and proprietor and editor of the Kendal Mercury. Lee learned journalism under his father, whom he eventually succeeded in the editorship of the Mercury, retaining it till 1883. Meanwhile, he gave much time to field sports, especially fishing and otter-hunting, also to cricket, and becoming an authority on wrestling. In spite of defective eyesight he was an expert fly fisher.

Lee made his chief reputation as a breeder of dogs. In 1869 he first formed a kennel, and his pack of Fellside terriers became well known to otter-hunters. He specialized in Fox Terriers: in 1871 he won the cup at the national show at Birmingham with a dog of this breed. He was also successful with Dandie Dinmont Terriers, pointers, collies, Bull Terriers, Skye Terriers, and Clumber Spaniels. His English Setter, Richmond, after winning awards at home, went to Australia to improve the breed. Lee acted as judge at dog shows held at Bath, Darlington, and Lancaster. He finally retired from the show-ring in 1892. A powerful advocate of field trials for sporting dogs, he did much to extend the movement which began in 1865.

Lee had for several years written in The Field on angling and dog-breeding; he came to London in 1883 and joined its staff, succeeding John Henry Walsh as kennel-editor, and holding that post until June 1907. He also contributed occasionally to Land and Water, The Fishing Gazette, The Stock-keeper, and other papers.

He married in February 1907 Emily King, a widow.

Lee died in a nursing home at Putney on 29 February 1908.

== Publications ==
- History and Description of the Fox-terrier (1889; 4th edition, enlarged, 1902)
- History and Description of the Collie or Sheep Dog in his British Varieties, illustrated by Arthur Wardle (1890)
- History and Description of the Modern Dogs of Great Britain and Ireland — Non-sporting Division, illustrated by Arthur Wardle and R. H. Moore (1894, new edition 1899)
- History and Description of the Terriers, illustrated by Arthur Wardle and R. H. Moore (1894; 3rd edition 1903)
- History and Description of the Modern Dogs of Great Britain and Ireland — Sporting Division, illustrated by Arthur Wardle (2 vols. 1893; 3rd edition 1906)
