= Hinks =

Hinks is an English surname.

Notable people called Hinks include:

- James Hinks (manufacturer) (c.1816–1905), oil lamp manufacturer in Birmingham, England
- James Hinks (1829–1878), Irish–British dog breeder
- Joseph Hinks (1840–1931), British manufacturer and inventor, son of James Hinks (c.1816–1905)
- Arthur Robert Hinks (1873–1945), British astronomer and geographer
- Timothy Hinks (professor) (1977-present), professor in respiratory science

== See also ==
- Hanks (disambiguation)
- Hinkly
- Hincks
