= Bull and terrier =

Mixed breed of dogs

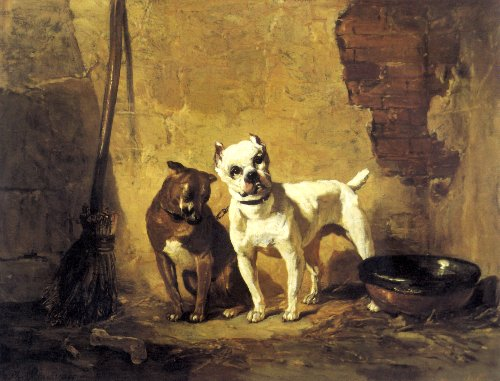
- Philippe Rousseau's "Best of Friends"; A bull-and-terrier and a white bulldog (c. 1887)
- Other names: Half-and-half, fighting bull terrier, bull-terrier, Canis pugilis
- Origin: Britain
- Foundation stock: Old English Bulldog; Old English Terrier; Whippet
- Breed status: Not recognised as a breed by any major kennel club.
- Notes: Progenitor of: Bull Terrier, Miniature Bull Terrier, Staffordshire Bull Terrier, American Pit Bull Terrier, Dogo Argentino, Boston Terrier, and American Staffordshire Terrier.

Bull and terrier was a common name for crossbreeds between bulldogs and terriers in the early 1800s. Other names included half-and-halfs and half-breds. It was a time in history when, for thousands of years, dogs were classified by use or function, unlike the modern pets of today that were bred to be conformation show dogs and family pets. Bull and terrier crosses were originally bred to function as fighting dogs for bull- and bear-baiting, and other popular blood sports during the Victorian era. The sport of bull baiting required a dog with attributes such as tenacity and courage, a wide frame with heavy bone, and a muscular, protruding jaw. By crossing bulldogs with various terriers from Ireland and Great Britain, breeders introduced "gameness and agility" into the hybrid mix.

Little is known about the pedigrees of bull and terrier crosses, or any other crosses that originated during that time. The types and styles of dogs varied geographically depending on individual preferences. Breeders in one area may have preferred a cross with a higher percentage of terrier than bulldog. Some early anecdotal reports indicate that bulldog to terrier was preferred over bull and terrier to bull terrier, which was likely to have resulted in at least half or more bulldog blood. The bull and terrier was never a bona fide breed; rather, it referred to a heterogeneous group of dogs that may include purebreds involving different breeds, as well as dogs believed to be crosses of those breeds. Those crossbreeds or hybrids are considered the forerunner of several modern standardised breeds.

In the mid-1830s, when enforcement of the ban on bull baiting had begun, the popularity of the original purebred bulldogs declined, and a major shift in canine genetics was occurring. The appearance of certain dogs were being altered by crossbreeding to better suit function. Not only were appearances of dogs changing, so was the terminology used to describe various breeds and dog types as recorded in ancient records. Such changes began casting doubts over the bulldog's earliest known ancestors.

== Terminology ==
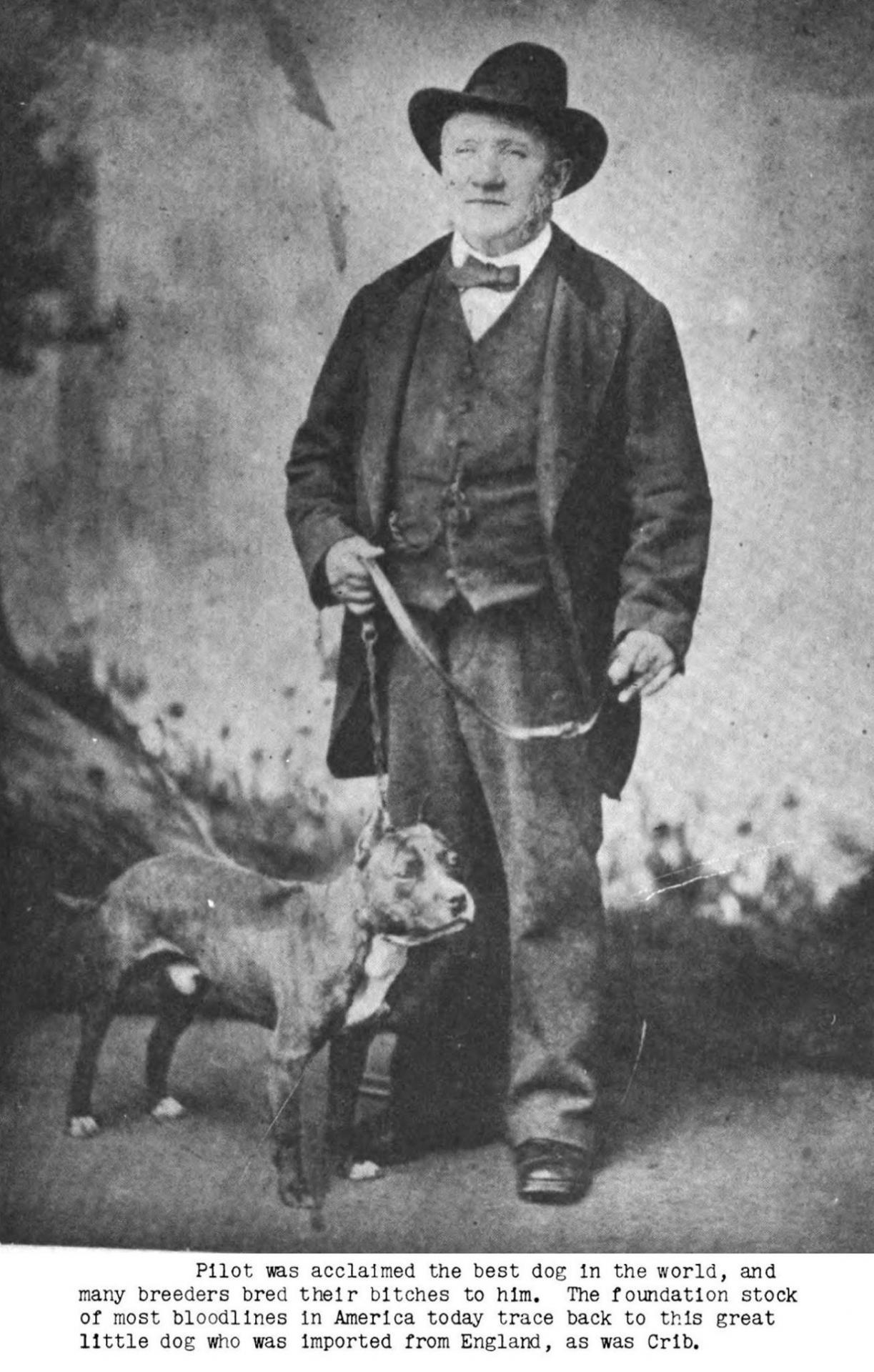
Charlie Lloyd and Pilot c. 1881

One example of how changing terminology over the centuries has caused confusion is the ubiquitous misuse of descriptors. For example, mastiff is a common descriptor for all large dogs, which created a cloud over the earliest origins of the bulldog. The Alaunt was once believed to be the likely ancestor of bulldogs and mastiffs, both of which came from Asia; others believed bulldogs descended only from mastiffs.

Over the centuries, hybrid bull and terrier crosses have been labelled with several aliases, such as half-and-half, half-bred, pit dog, bulldog terrier and pit bulldog. The most popular name was bull-terrier, a name later applied to the breed James Hinks was developing in the latter half of the 19th century. There are also many paintings, texts, and engravings created during or prior to this period that labelled the bull-and-terrier only as "bull-terrier". Hinks was still developing his new bull terrier, nicknamed White Cavalier, which he presented at the Birmingham show in May 1862.

The term pit bull terrier was sometimes applied, though later applied when naming the American Pit Bull Terrier, a modern standardised breed. The term "pit bull" is a ubiquitous term that is often misused to infer that the pit bull is a bona fide breed of dog, when it actually refers to a diverse group of dogs that may include purebred dogs of many breeds as well as dogs that are assumed to be blends of those breeds. These types of descriptors vary, depending on the recognised breeds and observers' perspectives. Despite anecdotal misinformation and incorrect visual identification, dog owners, animal shelters, veterinarians and the general public routinely use the term "pit bull" in casual and official papers as though it denotes a single, recognised breed.

== History ==
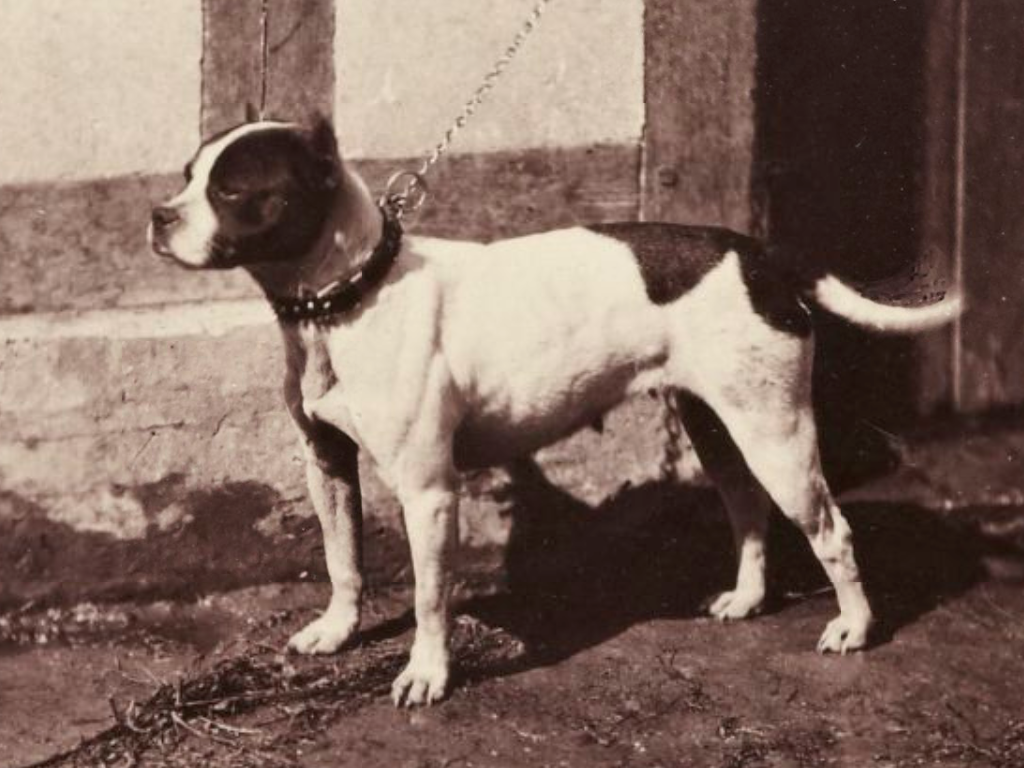
Bull and terrier, Rose (Paris, 1863)

Bulldogs of the 1800s were described as having a "round head, short nose, small ears and wide, muscular frame and legs." Their temperament has been described as being more aggressive and ferocious than other dogs of the time. It is believed their ancestors may have been mastiffs of Asian descent because of their aggressive tendencies and strength, but the term "mastiff" was used as a general reference for large dogs. Whether or not they were crossed with Pugs to make them better at bull baiting remains controversial.

It is assumed that bull and terrier hybrids were crossed with several varieties of bulldogs and terriers, the types of which depended on location. A 2016 genetic assessment verified that bulldogs were descendants of mastiffs, but it also discovered pugs in the cross. The assessment, which analysed a particular group of individual English bulldogs, used DNA rather than pedigrees to confirm that genetic diversity actually still exists. It further confirmed a substantial loss of genetic diversity in the breed resulting from a small founder population of about 68 individuals. The impact of focused selection for breeding dogs with specific physical traits created artificial genetic bottlenecks.

" The vast majority of dogs that people have as pets really arrived from the Victorian era from very active breeding... There are rather few 'ancient breeds'."

—Krishna Veeramah, B.Sc., Ph.D.

In Ireland, they used the old Irish bulldog with different terriers and some insertion of hunting sighthound/terrier crosses. In England, there were several varieties such as the Walsall and the Cradley Heath types. Phil Drabble reported that among the various types of bull and terrier, the type from Cradley Heath was recognised as a separate breed to be named the Staffordshire Bull Terrier. In the 19th century, the Walsall type was carried by immigrants to the United States, where it served as an important component for the genetic basis of the American Pit Bull Terrier breed, through specimens such as the dog Lloyd's Pilot and the Colby bloodline, strongly combined with Irish strains. The anatomy of the bull and terrier is the result of selective breeding for the purpose of hunting, dog fighting and baiting.

== Descendants ==
In "Popular and Illustrated Dog Encyclopaedia" (1934–35), Major Mitford Price wrote, "The original Bull Terrier, or Bull-and-Terrier, as he was then styled, bred for fighting in the pits, bore a far closer resemblance to the Bulldog of that day than to his terrier forebears: for there exists scores of old prints as evidence that the old Bulldog, as well as the Bull-and-Terrier had the unexaggerated (in comparison with the absurd modern standards) Bulldog head, and the legs, straight and longer, of the terrier. At the same time that the new Bull-and-Terrier made its appearance, the Bulldog fanciers began breeding their animals heavier and lower to the ground, so that the Bulldog acquired a new type.

Six distinct breeds descended from the bull and terrier hybrids, five of which were recognised by the American Kennel Club (AKC) in the following order: Bull Terrier, Boston Terrier, American Staffordshire Terrier (AmStaff), Staffordshire Bull Terrier, Miniature Bull Terrier. All five breeds have also been recognised by the Canadian Kennel Club (CKC), and Fédération cynologique internationale (FCI). The American Pit Bull Terrier (APBT) is recognised by the United Kennel Club (UKC), and American Dog Breeders Association. The AKC does not recognise the American Pit Bull Terrier. After being petitioned in the 1930's to recognise the breed, they relented, however; they recognised these dogs under a different name, the Staffordshire Terrier. The name was later changed to American Staffordshire Terrier, to prevent the dogs from being confused with the English Staffordshire Terriers. The American Staffordshire Terrier and the American Pit Bull Terrier were once the same breed, and many still consider them to be. Today, there are some dogs which have been dual registered as both an APBT through the UKC, and as an AmStaff through the AKC.

=== DNA analysis ===
Geneticists have been able to further refine the sparse historical aspects of breed formation, and the time of hybridisation. A 2017 genome-wide research study suggests the following: "In this analysis, all of the bull and terrier crosses map to the terriers of Ireland and date to 1860–1870. This coincides perfectly with the historical descriptions that, though they do not clearly identify all breeds involved, report the popularity of dog contests in Ireland and the lack of stud book veracity, hence undocumented crosses, during this era of breed creation (Lee, 1894)."

It also confirms that the bull and terrier was a heterogeneous group of dogs that may include purebreds involving different breeds, as well as dogs believed to be crosses of those breeds. By 1874, in Britain the first Kennel Club Stud Book was published, which included Bull Terriers and Bulldogs.

== Hunters ==
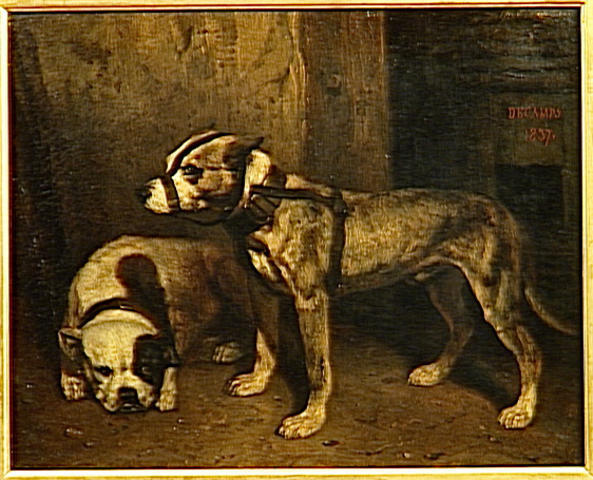
"Bulldog and scotch terrier" by Alexandre Gabriel Decamps. Circa 1837. An Old English Bulldog and a muzzled bull and terrier.

Some believe that the courage of most terriers, both past and present, to bear the bites of badgers and other prey they are meant to corner, dig for, or attack is derived from having a quarter to an eighth of Old English Bulldog ancestry. Other terriers that were not developed by crossing Old English Bulldogs and earth-working dogs were believed to be of inferior quality and were valued far less. There are earth-working dogs who by default and definition are called terriers because they have the ability to go to ground; however, the best earth-working and hunting terriers were regarded as the progeny of bulldogs bred to earth-working dogs (terriers), with the offspring known as bull-terriers or half-bred dogs, among other names.

Walsh also wrote of the Fox Terrier (or, rather, of its cross-breed ancestor): "The field fox-terrier, used for bolting the fox when gone to ground, was of this breed [bull and terrier]." Not only is the Fox Terrier the progeny of the bull-and-terrier, but so is the Airedale Terrier, rat-working terriers, working black and tan terriers and most all other vermin-hunting terriers. James Rodwell described in his book titled The Rat: Its History and Destructive Nature, that the great object, among the various breeders of bull-and-terrier dogs for hunting vermin and rats, was to have them as nearly thorough-bred bull as possible, but at the same time preserving all the outward appearances of the terrier as to size, shape and colour.

The terrier as used for hunting is a strong useful little dog, with great endurance and courage and with nearly as good a nose as the Beagle or Harrier. From his superior courage when crossed with the Bulldog, as most vermin-terriers are, he has generally been kept for killing vermin whose bite would deter the Spaniel or the Beagle, but would only render the terrier more determined in his pursuit of them. ~ John Henry Walsh, The Dog, in Health and Disease, by Stonehenge (1859)

== Rat-baiting ==
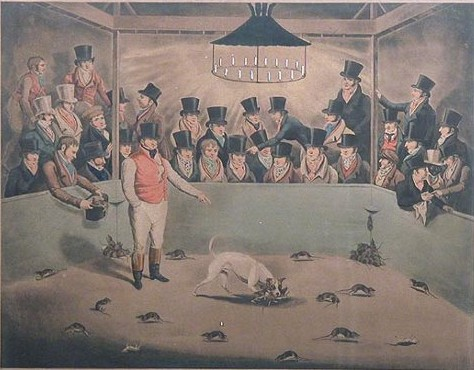
Billy, the celebrated rat-killing dog, London, circa 1823

Rat-baiting with dogs, often bull and terrier's, was a 19th century blood sport popular in the United Kingdom, particularly London, where the dogs were placed into a confined space or pit containing live rats with a timekeeper to determine how quickly they could kill the rats. This blood sport combined gambling, spectacle and the working dog tradition. Rat-baiting rests at the intersection of the Victorian era urban cultural entertainment, canine history and the changing attitudes between animal cruelty to animal welfare.

A celebrated bull and terrier named "Billy" weighing about 12kg (26lb), had a tall fighting history with his pedigree reflecting the build-up over the years. The dog was owned by Charles Dew and was bred by breeder James Yardington. On the paternal side is "Old Billy" from the kennel of John Tattersal from Wotton-under-Edge, Gloucestershire, and was descended from one the best lines of Old English Bulldogs. On the maternal side is "Yardington's Sal" descended from the Curley line.

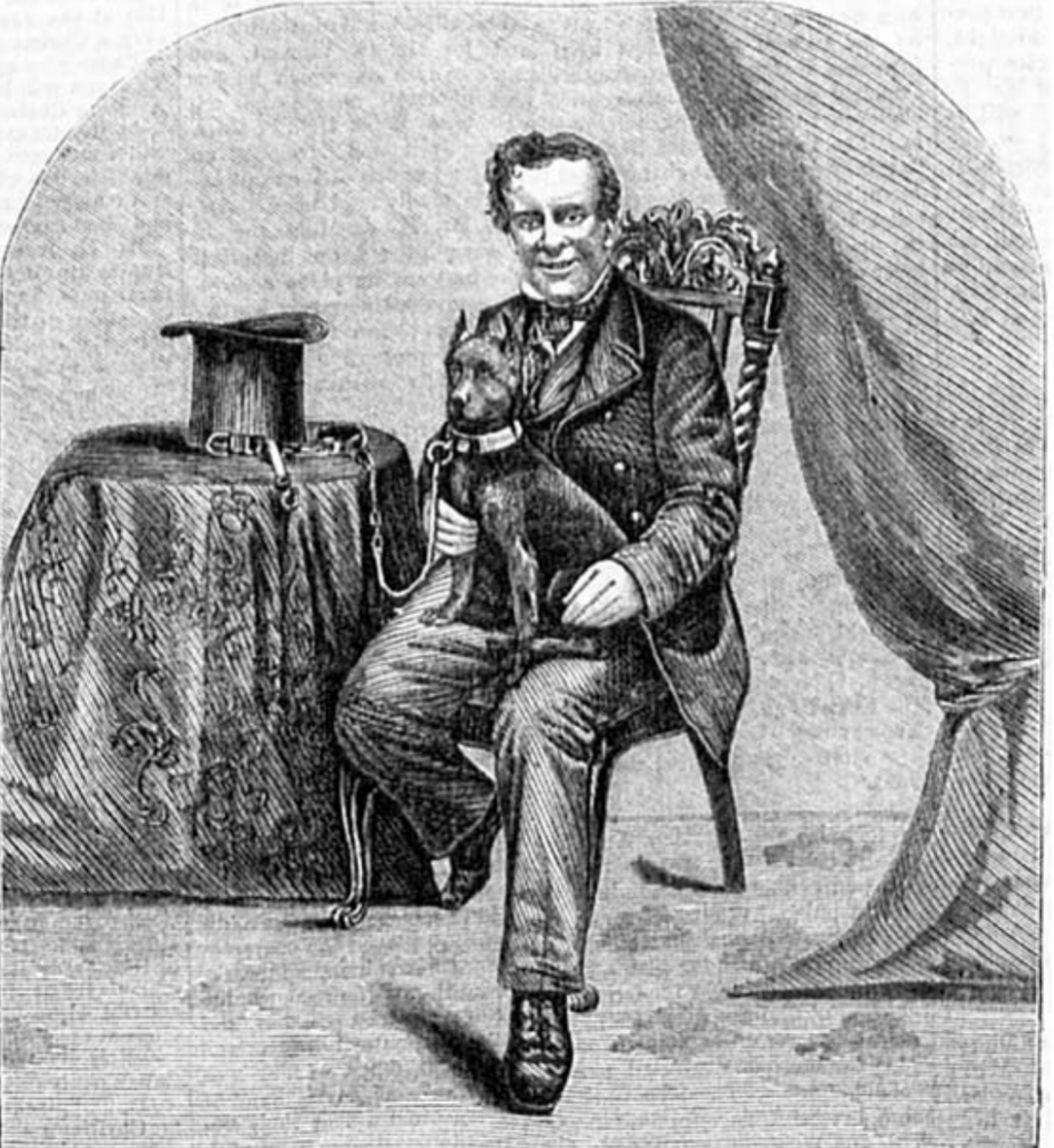
Jemmy Shaw and champion dog, Jacko, c.1865

According to the Sporting Chronicle Annual, the world record in rat killing is held by a black and tan bull and terrier named "Jacko", weighing about 13 lb and owned by Jemmy Shaw. Jacko set two world records, the first on 29 July 1862, with a killing time of 2.7 seconds per rat and the second on 1 May 1862, with his fight against 100 rats, where Jacko worked two seconds faster than the previous world record holder "Billy". The feat of killing 1,000 rats took place over ten weeks, with 100 rats being killed each week ending on 1 May 1862.

The “black-and-tan bull-and-terrier” refers to a now extinct 19th century crossbreed developed in Britain by combining the Old English Bulldog with various terrier types, but most extensively the Manchester Terrier black-and-tan type. These dogs were purpose bred for blood sports such as rat-baiting and their lineage is foundational to several modern breeds.

== Dog fighting ==
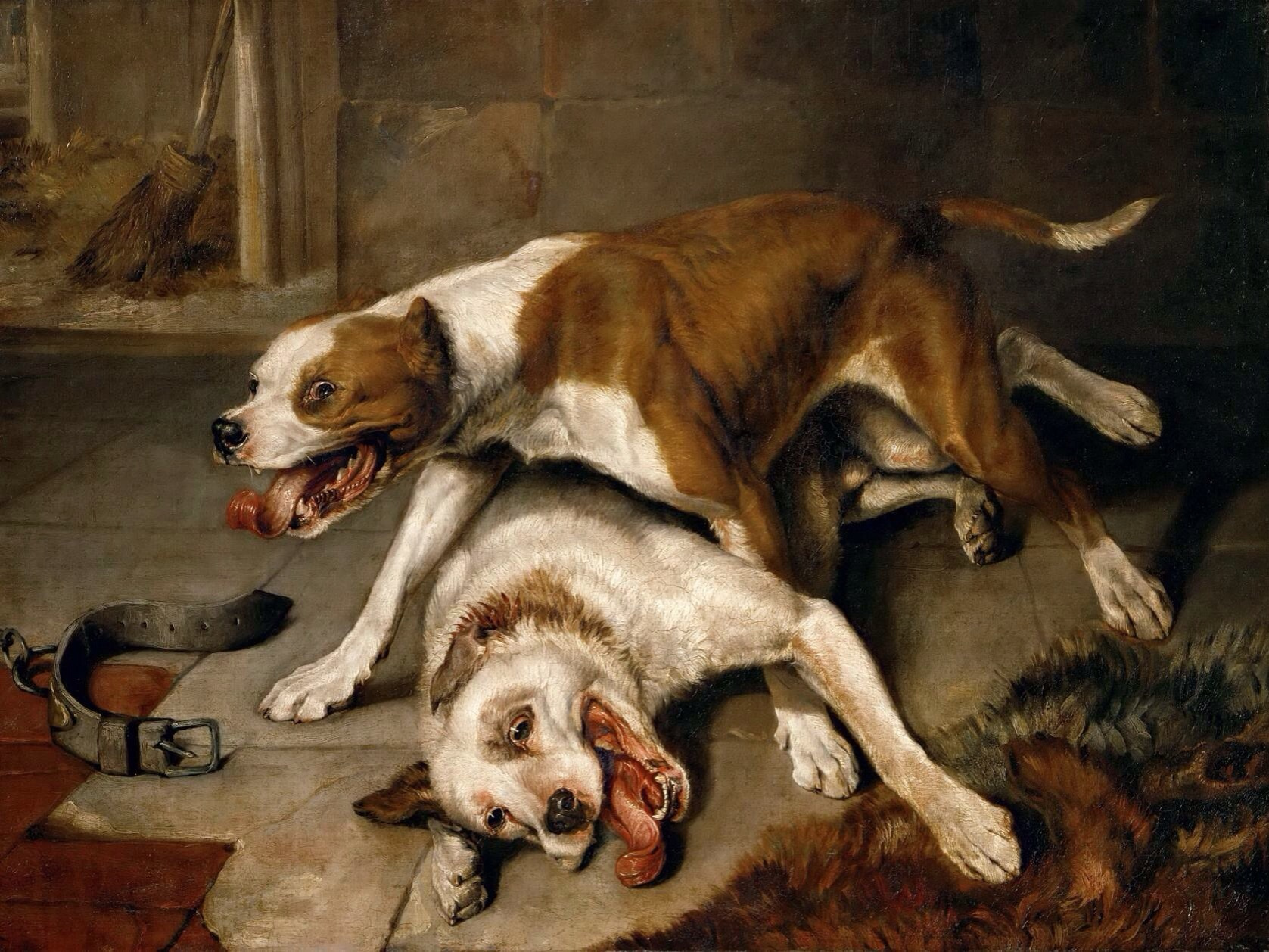
Fighting Dogs Getting Wind by Edwin Henry Landseer, 1818

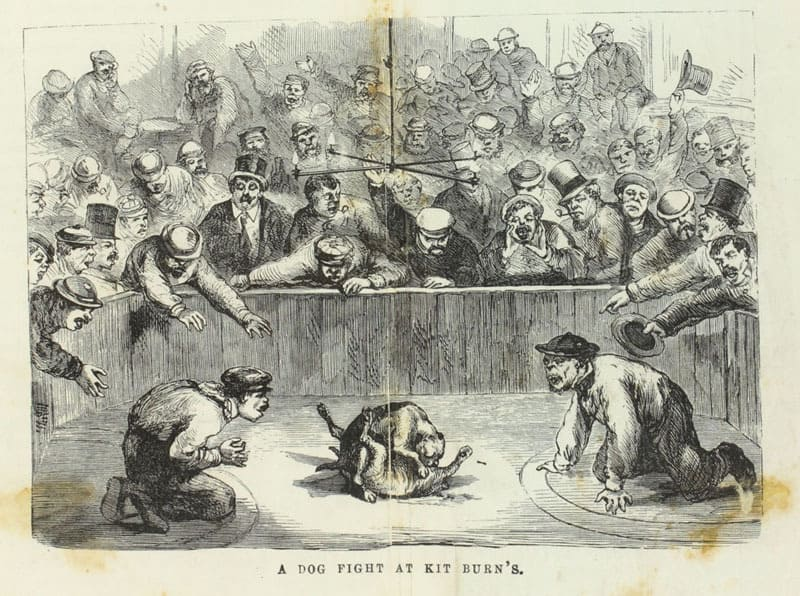
A Dog Fight at Kit Burns' by Edward Winslow Martin. New York, 1868.

In the 19th century, breeders crossed Bulldogs and English White Terriers to produce fighting dogs that were the forebears of the modern Bull Terrier breed. When blood sports were banned in the early 1800s, breeders continued with their clandestine dog fights in discreet venues, such as basements and warehouses. A major shift in canine genetics occurred during the Victorian era, at which time the appearance of certain dogs were being actively altered. The early bulldogs of the 1800s were described as having a "round head, short nose, small ears and wide, muscular frame and legs." In the 1830s, the ban on bull baiting was being strictly enforced, and with it, a noticeable decline in the popularity of the original bulldogs. Breeders had already begun crossing bulldogs with terriers for clandestine pit fighting.

James Hinks, a dog breeder in Birmingham, is credited for his role in helping to standardise the bull and terrier hybrid. Hinks introduced new blood, presumably Collies to add length to the muzzle. His version was becoming a more streamlined version of the bulldog and terrier hybrid while still maintaining substance. Hink's son said that, early on, his father also used Dalmatians to create the Bull Terrier's striking all-white coat. Others have suggested that Hinks straightened the bulldog's tendency for bowed legs by adding Pointer blood, or possibly Greyhound. Hink's son recalled, "In short, they became the old fighting dog civilized, with all of his rough edges smoothed down without being softened; alert, active, plucky, muscular, and a real gentleman." Hink's early Bull Terriers were white which gave rise to congenital sensorineural deafness (CSD), a genetic condition linked to coat colour phenotypes in English bull terriers with genetic variations that go beyond coat colour. The appearance of the Bull Terrier continued to change over time, and by the 20th century its egg-shaped head had become more prominent, soon to be standardised along with the various colours that had been introduced.

== Famous bull and terriers ==
Author David Harris describes in his book The Bully Breeds, two illustrations of prize fighting dogs. The first was Trusty appearing in an 1806 issue of The Sporting Magazine, and the second was Dustman appearing in an 1812 issue of the same magazine. Trusty was a fawn coloured bull and terrier that showed more bulldog traits than terrier, and was reputed to be undefeated, having won 104 dog fights. Trusty was purchased by Thomas Pitt, 2nd Baron Camelford and presented to Jem Belcher, a champion prize fighter of England. Unlike Trusty, Dustman appeared to have more terrier traits than bulldog and was used for badger-baiting.

"DUSTMAN is a celebrated dog, the property of Wm. Disney, Esq. and of a breed between a bull and a terrier, the best of any to attack that formidable animal, the badger. The breed of dogs of this description, has been much encourage of late, and held in great estimation, as being more staunch than the terrier, and not too powerful for the badger."

In 1822, Pierce Egan, a sporting event commentator of the 1820s, first introduced the name Bull Terrier (not to be confused to the 1880s Hinks' Bull Terrier). Subsequently, Bulls-eye was introduced in The Adventures of Oliver Twist (1838), presumed to be a bull terrier owned by the villain Bill Sykes.

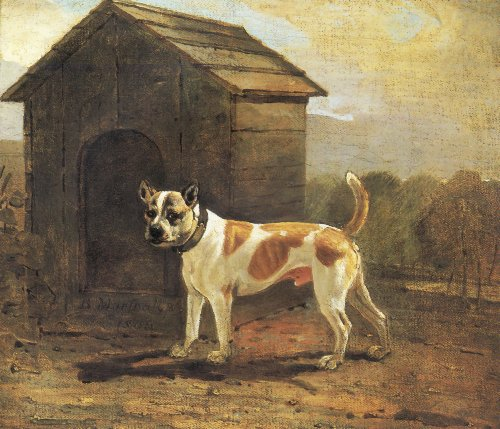
Dustman

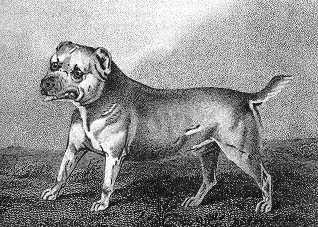
Trusty

== See also ==
- Bulldog type
- Terrier
