= American Staffordshire Terrier =

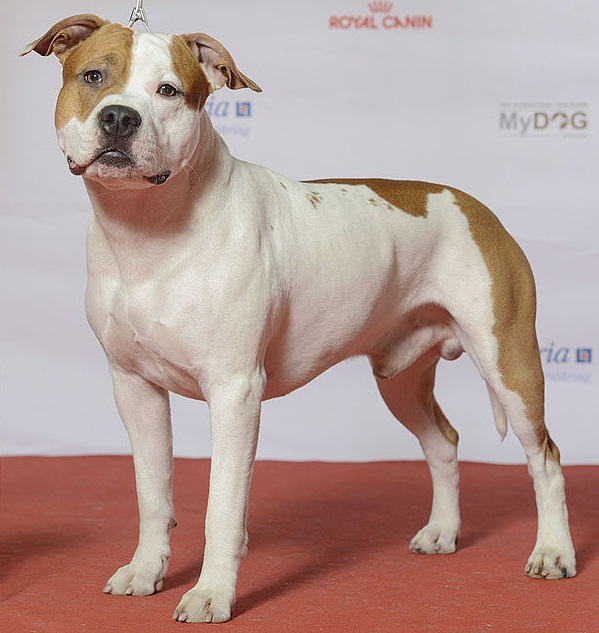
- American Staffordshire Terrier at a dog show
- Common nicknames: AmStaff
- Origin: United States
- Foundation stock: Bull and terrier
Traits
- Height: 16.9–18.8 in (43–48 cm)
- Weight: about 50–80 lb (23–36 kg)
- Coat: Smooth
- Color: black, fawn, red, white, blue, solid, part or patched, brindle (All-white, 80%+ white, black and tan, and liver are not encouraged). Must have black nose and not red. Note there is also no such thing as a "blue nose Amstaff" or Merle colored Amstaff
Kennel club standards
- American Kennel Club: standard
- Fédération Cynologique Internationale: standard

The American Staffordshire Terrier, also known as the AmStaff, is a medium-sized, short-coated American dog breed recognized by the American Kennel Club, but not the United Kennel Club, which instead allows American Staffordshire Terriers to be registered under the American Pit Bull Terrier breed.

The American Staffordshire Terrier stands 18–19 in (46–48 cm) tall and weighs between 40–70 lb (18–32 kg). The American Kennel Club (AKC) describes the breed as "confident, smart and good-natured". American Staffordshire Terriers are similar to the American Pit Bull Terrier, sharing ancestry, temperament, and size, although American Staffordshire Terriers are typically stockier than American Pit Bull Terriers. The American Staffordshire should not be confused with the "Staffy" Staffordshire Bull Terrier of the United Kingdom.

== History ==
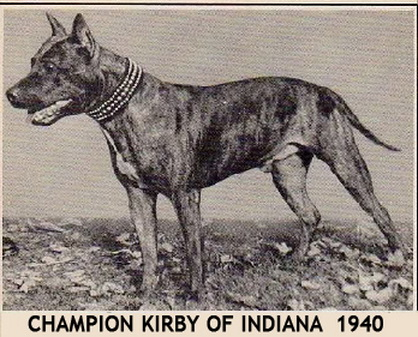
One of the earliest AKC AmStaff dog show champions.

Some varieties of the extinct bull-and-terrier dog from the British Isles began to find their way into America as early as 1850. These varieties became a breed recognized by the United Kennel Club as American Pit Bull Terrier in 1898. In 1936 the American Kennel Club recognized the breed with a different name and registered some individuals in the stud book. The name Staffordshire Terrier was approved because the ancestors of the breed were claimed to originally come from Staffordshire, England, a theory inspired by the recognition in 1935 of the related Staffordshire Bull Terrier by the British Kennel Club. The name of the AKC registered breed was revised on January 1st 1969 to American Staffordshire Terrier to distinguish it from the British Staffordshire Bull Terrier.

The AKC closed and opened the AmStaff Stud Book to UKC registered American Pit Bull Terrier dogs a few more times until the 1970s. Since then both sire and dam have had to be AKC registered dogs in order to register offspring as American Staffordshire Terriers. The breed selection was based entirely on conformation and established breed standards that for decades have transformed the American Staffordshire Terrier into a much different breed from the American Pit Bull Terrier.

== Temperament ==
According to the American Kennel Club, these dogs are "smart, confident, good-natured companions. Their courage is proverbial. A responsibly bred, well-socialized AmStaff is a loyal, trustworthy friend to the end."

The official breed club of America points out that dog aggression can occur even if the dogs have been well-socialized and that therefore they should not be left alone with other dogs.

== Description ==
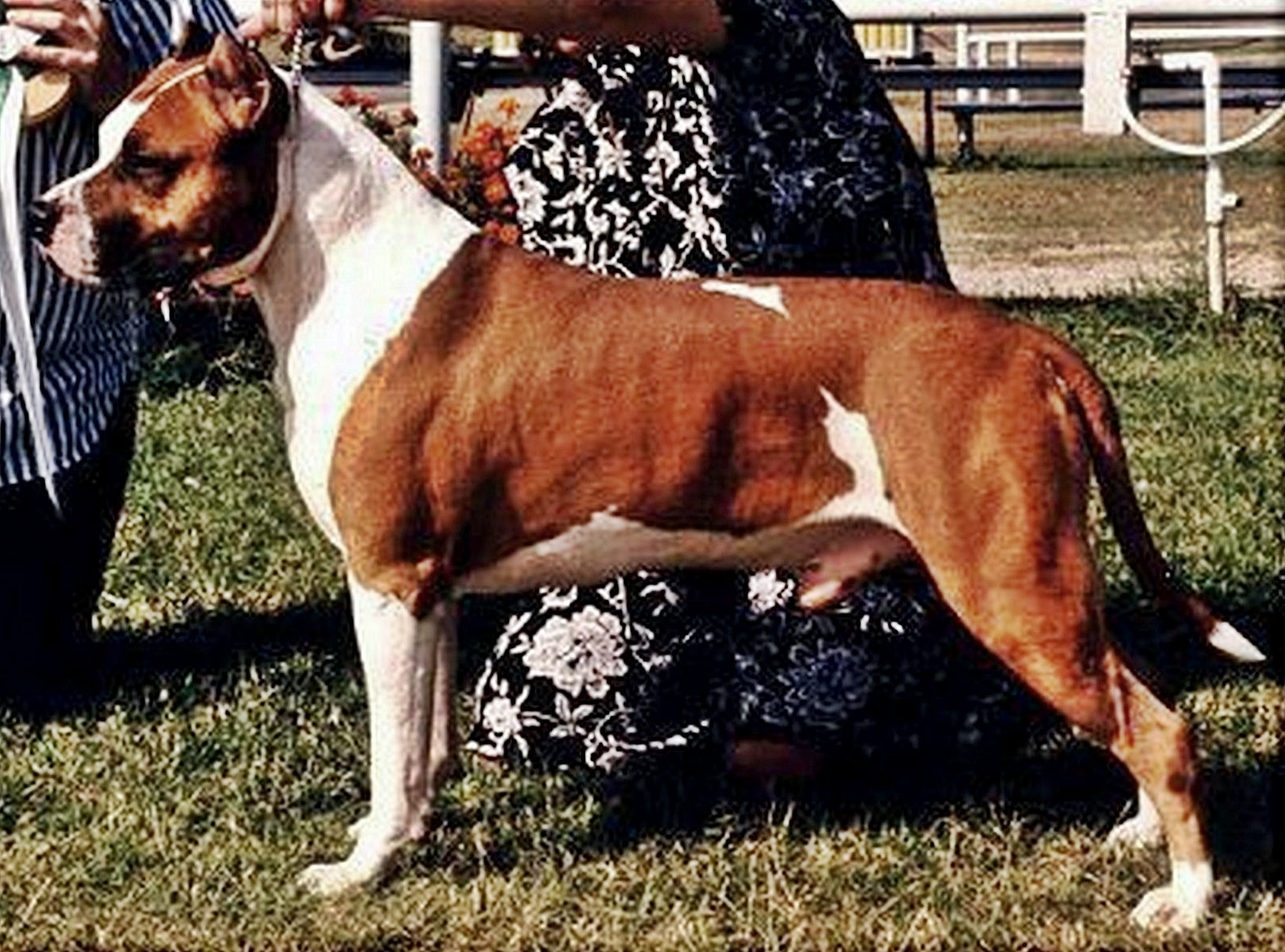
A 1990s conformation champion

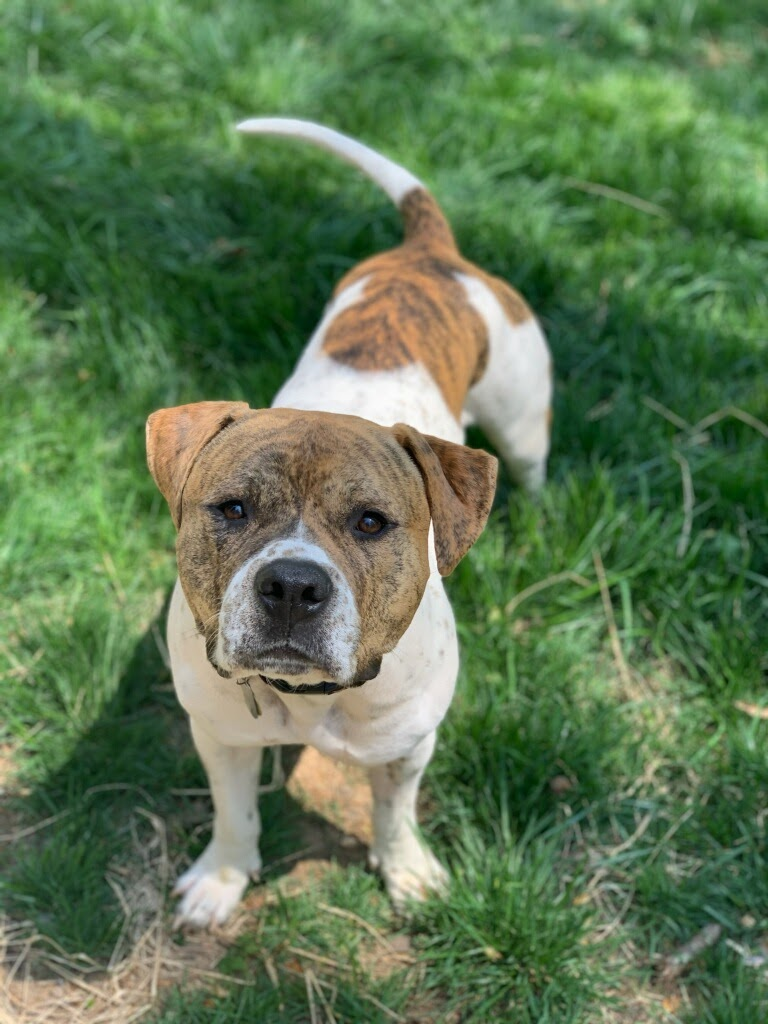
Male White and Brindle American Staffordshire Terrier

According to AKC's published breed standard approved June 10, 1936, the "American Staffordshire Terrier should give the impression of great strength for his size, a well put-together dog, muscular, but agile and graceful, keenly alive to his surroundings. He should be stocky, not long-legged or racy in outline. His courage is proverbial." The head should be medium in length with a broad skull, a distinct stop, and pronounced muscles in the cheek. The ears should be set high on their head and can be cropped or uncropped, but the latter is preferred. Height and weight should be in proportion. A height of about 18 to 19 inches (46 to 48 cm) at shoulders for the male and 17 to 18 inches (43 to 46 cm) for the female is to be considered preferable. The nose should always be black. Many coat colors are accepted; however, dogs with liver or black-and-tan coat and dogs with more than 80% white are discouraged.

== Health ==
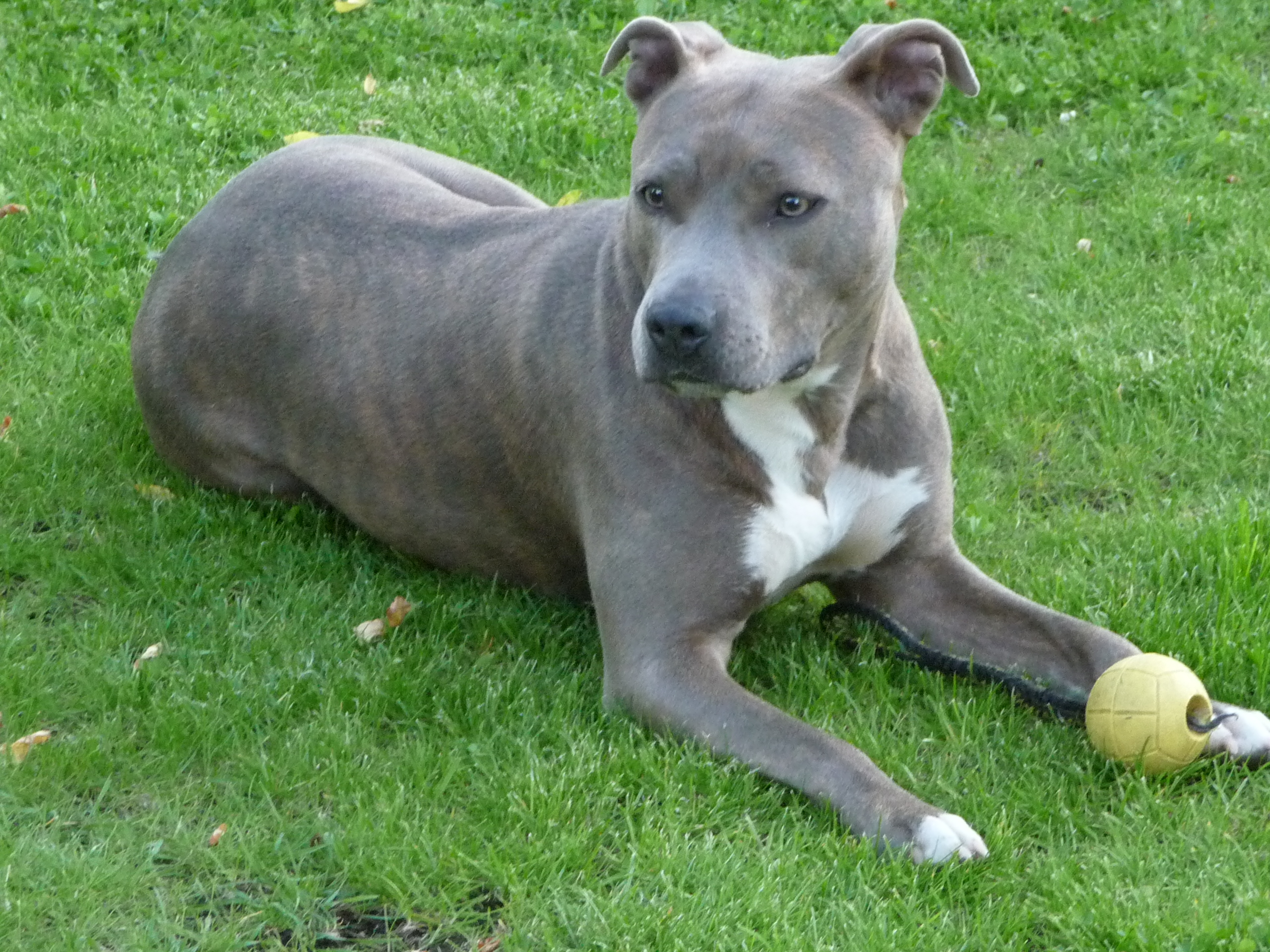
Female blue brindle American Staffordshire Terrier

A 2024 UK study found a life expectancy of 12.5 years compared to an average of 12.7 for purebreds and 12 for crossbreeds.

The breed is predisposed to allergic skin disease and demodicosis. An American study found 20% of juvenile (under the age of two) American Staffordshire Terriers to suffer from demodicosis compared to 0.58% overall.

A North American study of over 1 million hip and 250,000 elbow scans found 24.4% American Staffordshire Terriers to have hip dysplasia and 16.1% to have elbow dysplasia. Another North American study found 1.84% of American Staffordshire Terriers to have the condition, half of the overall rate of 3.52%.

== Breed-specific legislation and restrictions ==
Worldwide, the American Staffordshire Terrier has often been included in breed bans that target pit bull–type dogs and/or fighting dog breeds. Such breed-specific legislation (BSL) may range from outright bans on possession to restrictions and conditions of ownership. Breed Specific Legislation has been enacted in various countries including Austria, Canada, Denmark, France, Germany, India, Ireland, Israel, Norway, Turkey, and the United States.

== Popularity ==
In 2017, the breed was the eighth most popular dog according to the Australian National Kennel Council. According to Société Centrale Canine, it is the sixth most popular dog in France. According to the American Kennel Club, it was the 85th most popular dog in 2020.

== See also ==
- List of dog breeds
- Bull Terrier
- Miniature Bull Terrier
- Pit bull
- Luke the Dog
