= Hinkes =

Hinkes is a surname. Notable people with the surname include:

- Sidney Hinkes (1925–2005), British priest and pacifist
- Alan Hinkes (born 1954), British mountaineer

== See also ==
- Hinks
