= White English =

White English may refer to:

== Dogs ==
- American Bulldog, breed of utility dog
- White English Terrier, extinct breed of dog

== Other uses ==
- White British, an ethnicity classification used in the United Kingdom census
