= Willie (dog) =

George S. Patton's dog

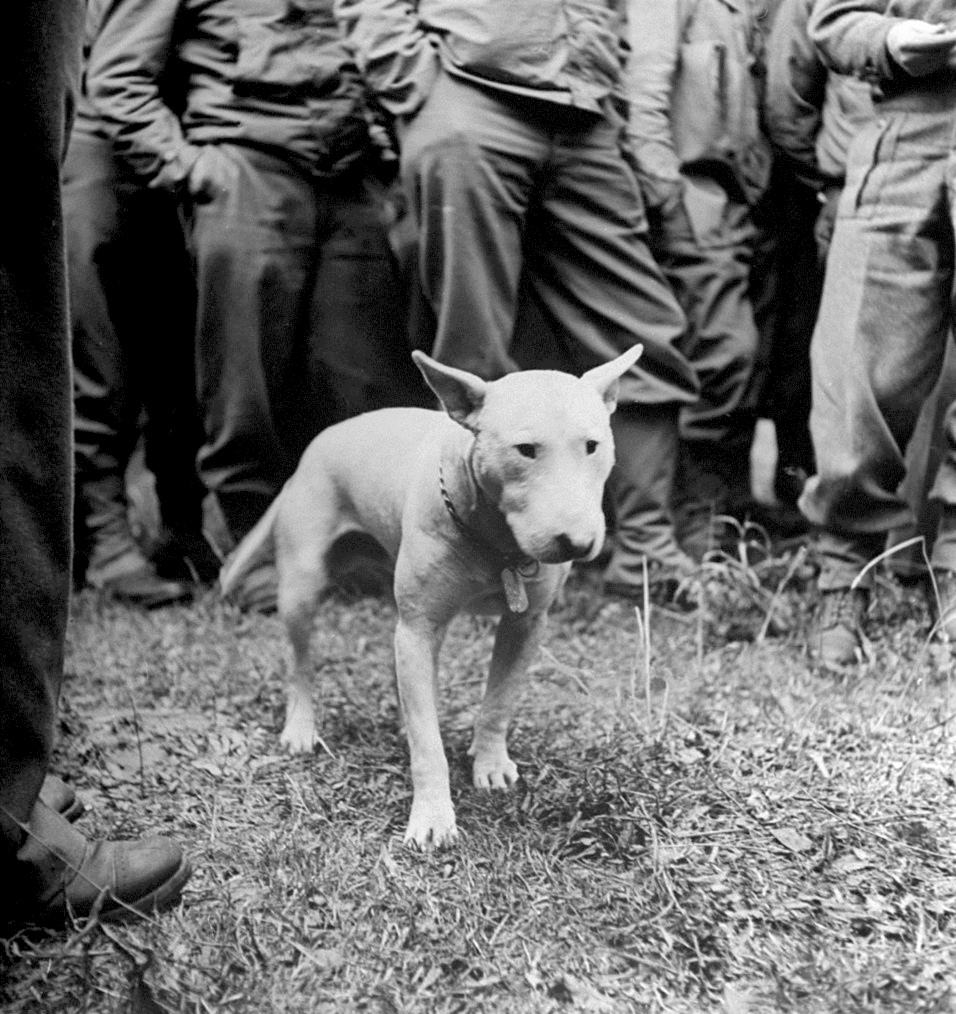
- Willie with Patton on August 28, 1944
- Species: Canis familiaris
- Breed: Bull Terrier
- Born: 1942; England
- Died: 1955; United States
- Known for: being the pet dog of General George S. Patton
- Owner: George S. Patton

William the Conqueror (1942–1955), also known as Willie, was a Bull Terrier owned by United States Army General George Patton during World War II.

== World War II and adoption by Patton ==
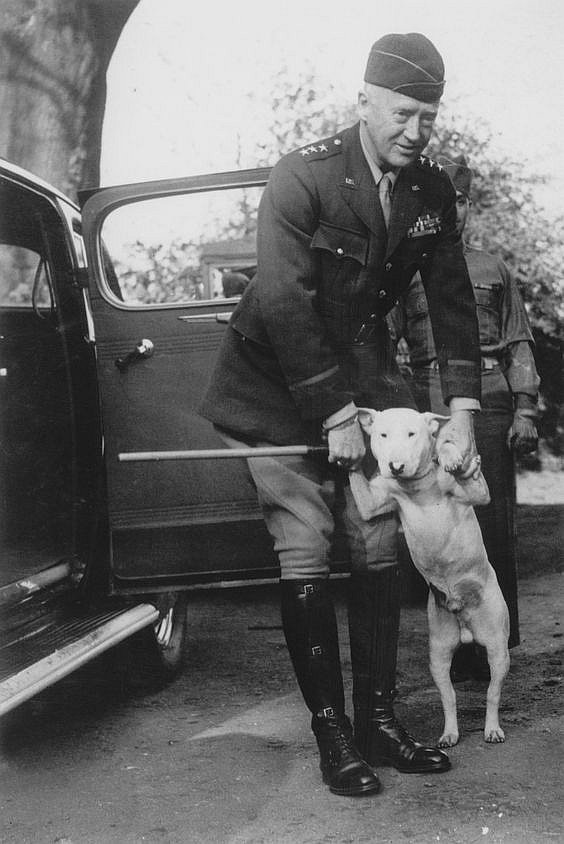
Patton playing with Willie

The dog was originally named Punch. He was the pet of an RAF pilot who sometimes took the dog on bombing missions. After the pilot was killed, the dog was bought from his wife by Patton's staff on March 4, 1944, in England. Contrary to popular belief, Patton named him Willie after a boy that he met during the Great Depression and not after William the Conqueror.

During the Second World War, Patton was always accompanied by Willie during his campaigns in Luxembourg, France and Belgium. This friendship was captured in various photos, with Willie always walking beside the General.

== Patton's accident ==
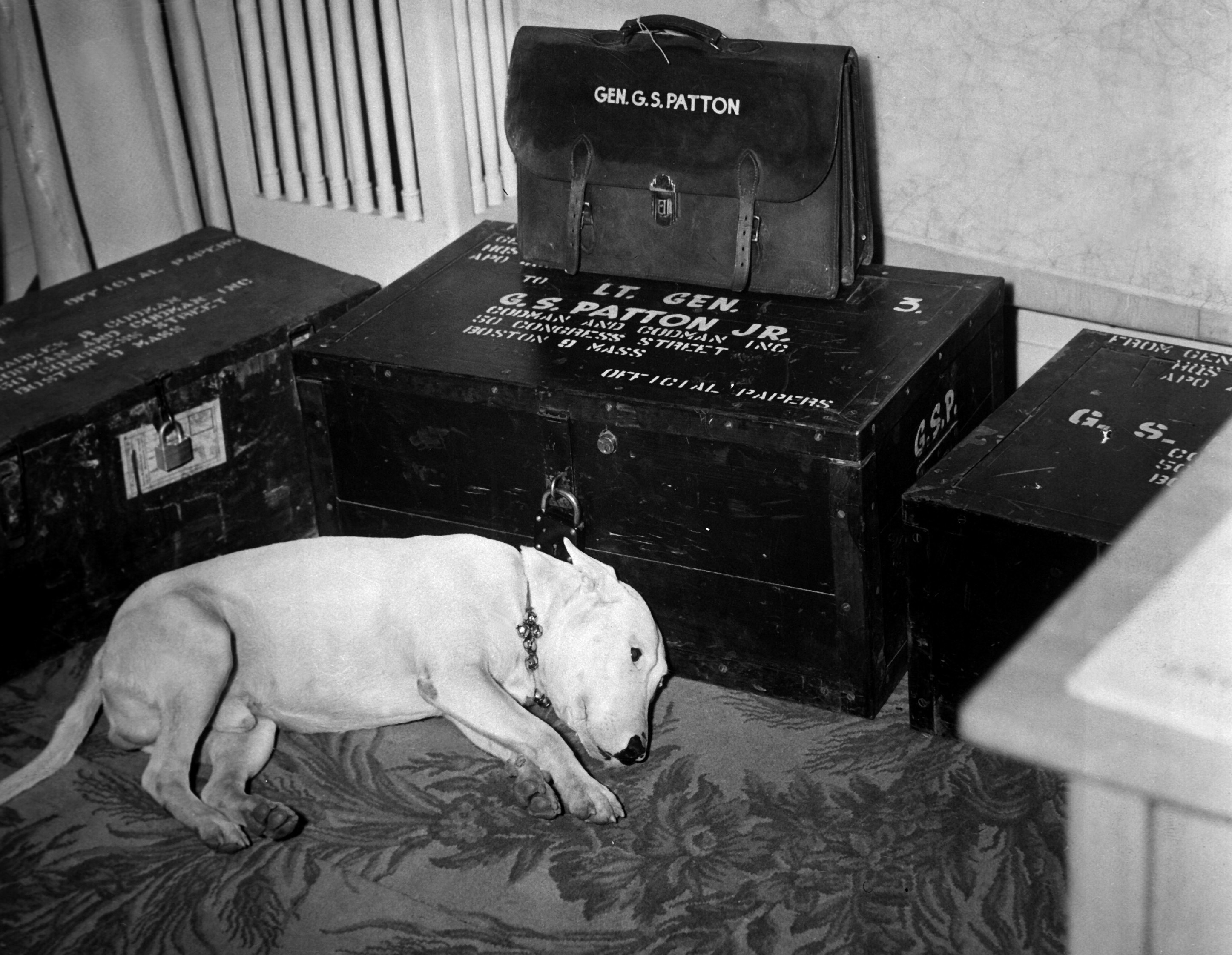
Willie mourning Patton's death, January 1946

On December 9, 1945, a limousine transporting Patton and his former chief of staff Hobart Gay to a hunting trip crashed into an American army truck near Speyer. Patton died on December 21 of injuries he sustained, leaving Willie's future uncertain.

Willie was sent to live with Patton's family as the beloved dog of a fallen warrior. He died in 1955, outliving both Patton and his wife. He is buried in an unmarked grave by a stone wall on Patton's property, which is still owned by the Patton family.

In 1970, Willie was portrayed in several scenes in Patton's biographical movie, Patton.

A 12-foot (3.7 m) high bronze statue of Patton and Willie stands at the General Patton Memorial Museum 30 miles (48 km) east of Indio, California.

== See also ==
- Bull Terrier
- List of individual dogs
- Media related to Willie (dog) at Wikimedia Commons
