= Hincks =

Hinck and Hincks are surnames, and may refer to:

== Hinck ==
- Jon Hinck (born 1954), American environmentalist

== Hincks ==
- Carroll C. Hincks (1889–1964), federal judge in the United States
- Sir Cecil Hincks (1894–1963), Australian politician
- Edward Hincks (1792–1866), Irish Assyriologist and clergyman
- Edward Winslow Hincks (1830-1894), career United States Army officer who served as a brigadier general during the American Civil War
- Francis Hincks (1807–1885), Irish born Canadian politician
- Thomas Hincks (naturalist) (1818–1899), British and Irish Unitarian minister and naturalist.
- Thomas Dix Hincks (1767–1857), Irish orientalist, naturalist and clergyman
- Walter Douglas Hincks (1906-1961), British entomologist

== See also ==
- Hicks (disambiguation)
- Hinks
