= Patsy Ann =

Bull terrier (1929–1942)

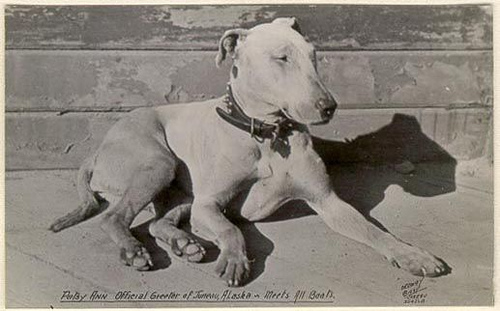
A 1930s postcard of Patsy Ann

Patsy Ann (October 1929 - March 1942) was a well-known bull terrier in Juneau, Alaska, celebrated for her unique role as the "Official Greeter of Juneau." Born in Portland, Oregon, Patsy Ann was brought to Juneau by her owners in the early 1930s. Soon after, she became emancipated, living freely and independently within the city for the remainder of her life.

Despite being born deaf, Patsy Ann was able to sense the arrival of ships at the port. Her reputation as a reliable predictor of incoming vessels quickly endeared her to the residents and visitors of Juneau alike. Locals reported seeing her commonly by the docks, awaiting the arrival of ships, and she slowly became a beloved figure in the local community.

In 1934, as the city of Juneau began enforcing regulations against unlicensed dogs, there was widespread concern for Patsy Ann's well-being. Kenneth Corliss was appointed as the city dogcatcher, and within a day of his appointment, the Alaska Daily Empire published an article titled "Is Patsy Ann in Danger?" This prompted a public outcry leading to a series of discussions among city officials about her status.

To safeguard Patsy Ann's future, the city government took steps to ensure her legal protection. On July 12, 1934, a dockside ceremony was held to officially recognize her unique position within the community. The event was timed to coincide with the anticipated arrival of the SS Prince George, to ensure Patsy Ann's attendance, as she was known to greet all arriving ships. During the ceremony, Patsy Ann was presented with a new collar and tag, and the mayor of Juneau formally bestowed upon her the title of "Official Greeter of Juneau."

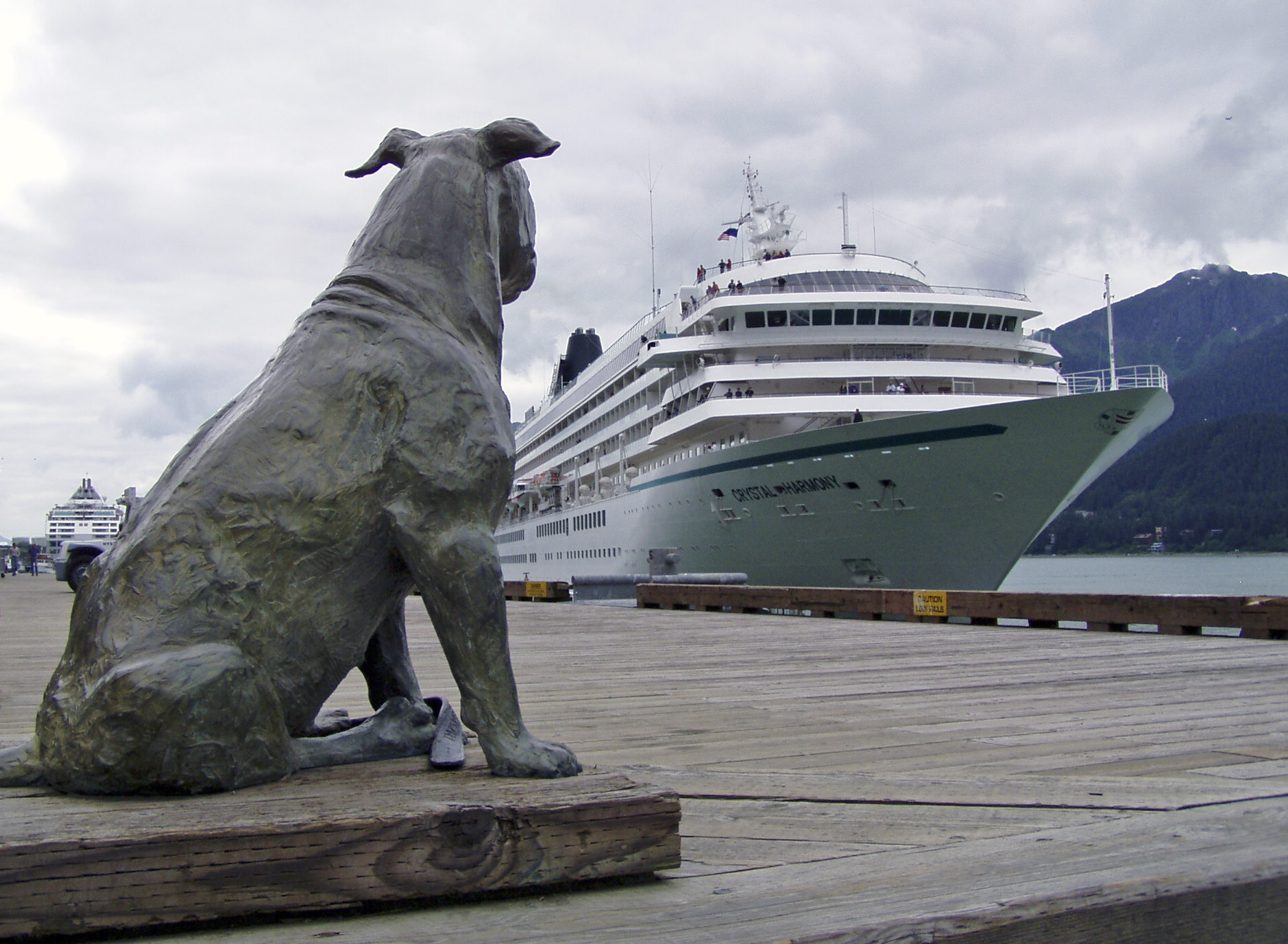
The statue of Patsy Ann in downtown Juneau

The publicity surrounding Patsy Ann's case had a notable impact on the community. Due to the widespread attention, more Juneau residents became aware of the city's new licensing ordinance. 42 additional dog owners sought licenses for their pets and by mid-year, 144 licenses had been issued, a significant increase compared to the 87 issued the previous year.

Patsy Ann died at the Longshoreman's Union Hall on March 30, 1942. The following morning, she was given a burial at sea, with her body placed in a casket and lowered into the Gastineau Channel from the dock where she had faithfully awaited incoming ships. In 1992, the "Friends of Patsy Ann" commissioned a bronze statue of the terrier for installation close to where she was laid to rest. The statue overlooks the cruise ships entering Juneau, symbolizing her eternal role as the "Official Greeter of Juneau," forever welcoming visitors to the city.

== In literature ==
Patsy Ann is featured in the YA time travel novel Dogstar, by Beverley Wood. https://www.goodreads.com/en/book/show/460051.DogStar

== See also ==
- List of individual dogs
