= James Hinks (manufacturer) =

James Hinks (c.1816 – 21 December 1905) was an oil lamp manufacturer in Birmingham, England, and the founder of the company James Hinks & Son.

== Early life and family background ==
James Hinks was born in about 1816 in Atherstone, Warwickshire, the son of Jonathan Hinks, a wool comber. He was the younger brother of John Hinks, a well-known and successful steel pen manufacturer.

== Career ==
James left home when he was 16 and tried his hand at a range of occupations, including wood turning and japanning, pub landlord, brush making, die sinking, medal making and cotton reel manufacture before turning his mind to perfecting the design of oil lamps. By 1858, in partnership with James Syson Nibbs, he was manufacturing an improved oil lamp from the Crystal Lamp Works on the corner of Great Hampton Street and Hockley Street, Birmingham. The partnership with Nibbs was dissolved in July 1858, although the lamps appear to have continued to be marketed by James under the Nibbs and Hinks name until December 1858.

James' son, Joseph, worked for his father from about the time he was 17 and by 1861 he was recorded as a manufacturer in the same terms as his father. By 1862 the business was called James Hinks and Son. A patent was granted to James Hinks in 1863 for "improvements in lamps", and there were subsequent design improvements. The Patent Duplex Lamp, marketed from about 1864, used two wicks instead of the usual one, and gave out twice the light. The great selling point of Hinks lamps was that they did not need frequent trimming or give off nasty smoke or smells.

The company was first incorporated in 1873 (and re-incorporated in 1896). Newspaper reports suggest that James retired as Managing Director and became Chairman in about 1897–98, when Joseph took over. The firm had bases in London and Birmingham. Important customers included railway companies, which used oil lamps to light stations, trains and signals. With an eye to the domestic market, Hinks' lamps were also decorative and borrowing from the designs of beautiful European china and porcelain table decorations their lamps were also a byword for domestic beauty, so much so that there is still a flourishing market for antique Hinks' lamps. They also developed specialist lamps and hurricane lanterns for India which was one of their most lucrative markets. Hinks' lamps were state-of-the-art until the early 20th century when electric lighting became the norm.

== Other interests ==
James had interests outside of business. For a time he was president of Aston Villa Football Club and he regularly attended matches at the Wellington Road ground at Perry Barr. He was a well known "courser" (someone who races greyhounds); some of his dogs were very well known in their time.

== Personal life ==
James married Elizabeth Benton (1816–1896) in Birmingham in 1839. They had six children, but three died in infancy; two daughters and a son, Joseph, survived. James retired in 1898 at the age of 83 and handed over the reins to Joseph.

== Death ==
James died in Edgbaston, aged 90, on 21 December 1905 and was buried in Key Hill Cemetery, Birmingham. When he died his estate was valued at over £80,000 [about £8m in today's money] and his will made generous bequests to local hospitals, charities and his servants (as well as his family).
