= Bull Terrier =

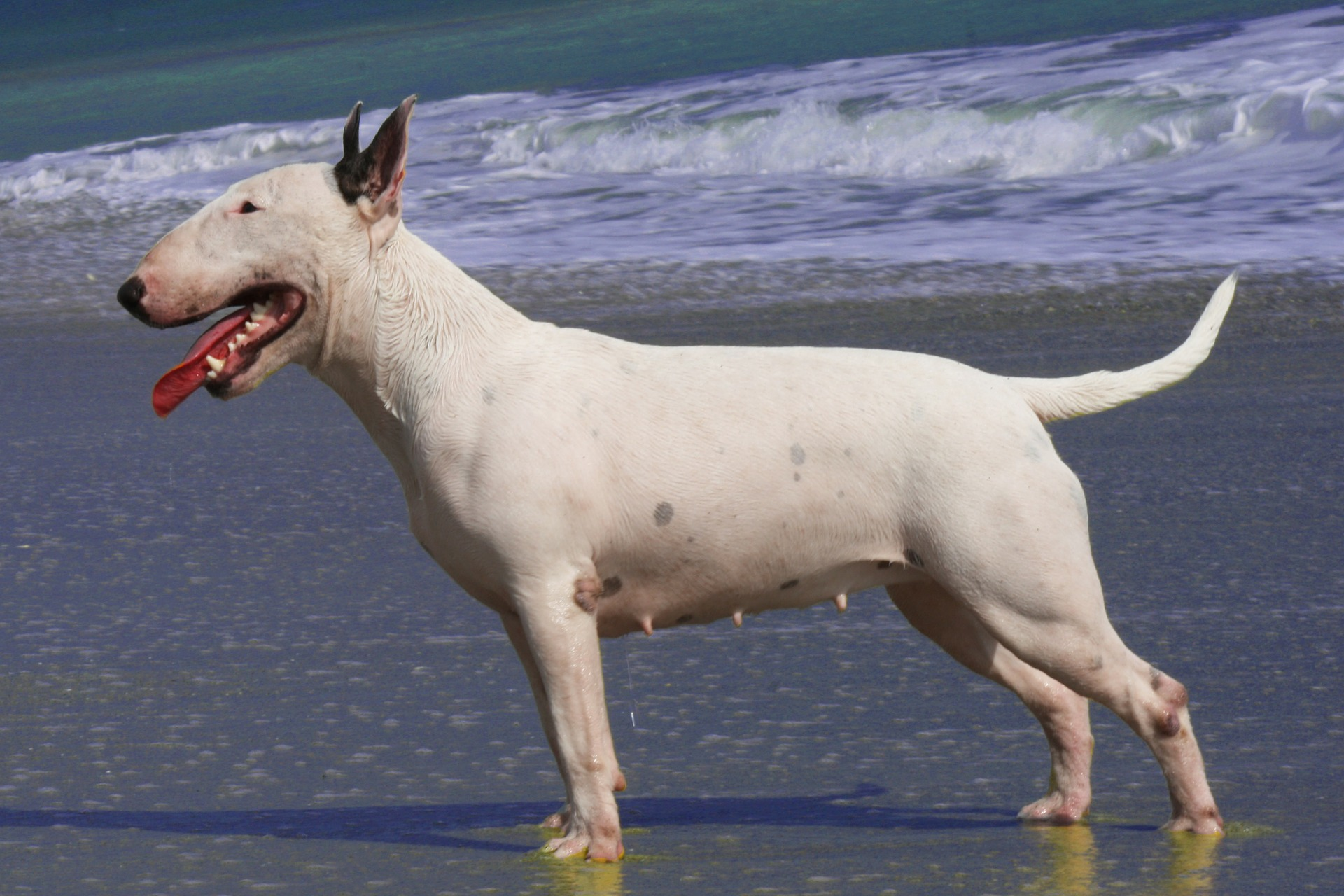
- Other names: English Bull Terrier; Bully
- Origin: England
Traits
Height	Males	No limits
	Females	No limits
Weight	Males	No limits
	Females	No limits
- Coat: Short, dense
- Colour: White, brindle, fawn, red, red smut, black, and tricolor (black, red, and white mixture).
Kennel club standards
- The Kennel Club: standard
- Fédération Cynologique Internationale: standard

The Bull Terrier is a breed of dog in the terrier family. There is also a miniature version of this breed, the Miniature Bull Terrier. This breed originates in England, where the bull and terrier breeds were originally bred for vermin control and bloodsports. In the mid-19th century, James Hinks began breeding the bull and terriers with English White Terriers, eventually resulting in the modern breed. The Bull Terrier has a distinctive 'egg-shaped' head, triangular eyes, and a robust body.

Bull Terriers have a slightly below average lifespan. White bull terriers have a strong tendency towards deafness, and may also inherit lethal acrodermatitis.

== Appearance ==
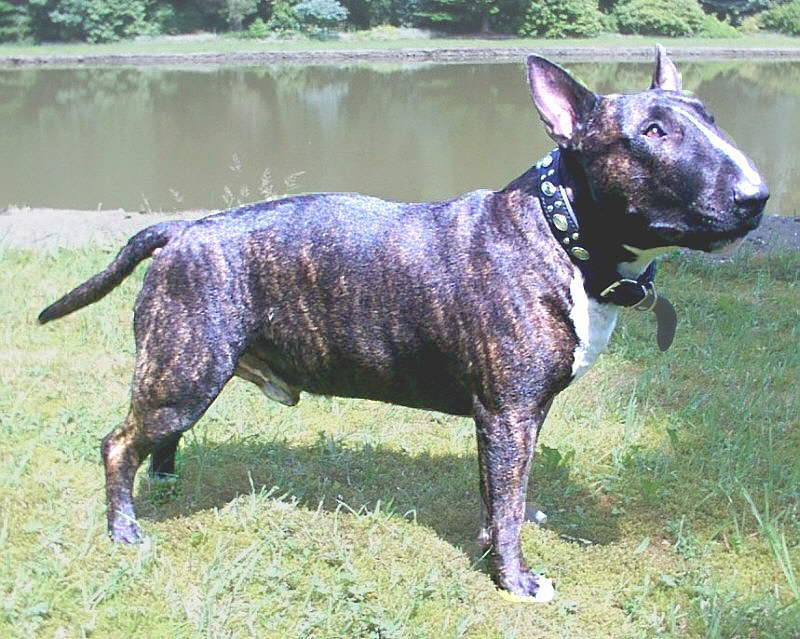
A brindle Bull Terrier showing head profile, triangular eyes, robust and very muscular body

The Bull Terrier's most recognizable feature is its head, described as 'egg-shaped', when viewed from the front; the top of the skull and face is almost flat. The profile curves gently downwards from the top of the skull to the tip of the nose, which is black and bent downwards at the tip, with well-developed nostrils. The lower jaw is deep and strong. The unique, triangular eyes are small, dark, and deep-set. Bull Terriers are one of the only dogs that have triangular eyes. The body is full and round, with strong, muscular shoulders. The tail is carried horizontally. They are either white, red, fawn, black, brindle, or a combination of these.

== Temperament ==
Bull Terriers have an even temperament, are open to discipline, and socialize well.

The breed is sometimes a target of breed-specific legislation, either by name or as a pitbull-type dog. A 2008 study in Germany did not find that Bull Terriers had any significant temperament difference from Golden Retrievers in overall temperament researches; despite this, the breed is banned from importation in Germany.

== Health ==
A 2024 UK study found a life expectancy of 12 years for the breed compared to an average of 12.7 for purebreeds and 12 for crossbreeds. An earlier UK breed survey puts their median lifespan at 10 years and their mean at 9 years (1 s.f., RSE = 13.87% 2 d. p.), with a good number of dogs living to 10–15 years.

Deafness occurs in 20.4% of pure white Bull Terriers and 1.3% of colored Bull Terriers. Many Bull Terriers have a tendency to develop skin allergies. Insect bites, such as those from fleas, and sometimes mosquitoes and mites, can produce a generalised allergic response of hives, rash, and itching.

Lethal acrodermatitis, also known as Acrodermatitis of the Bull Terrier, is a rare genodermatosis monogenic autosomal inherited disease found exclusively in white Bull Terriers (including the miniature Bull Terrier). The condition is usually fatal and is characterised by poor growth, decreased serum copper and zinc levels, immunodeficiency, bronchopneumonia, skin lesions, and erosions on the distal extremities. Other symptoms that occur later on include crusting, papules, pustules, erythema, hyperkeratosis, and colour dilution. The condition manifests within the first few weeks of life and most puppies affected die before the age of 2. Their size is roughly half of their unaffected litter mates at a year old. Unlike the human condition acrodermatitis enteropathica, zinc supplements do not improve symptoms.

A UK study found the Bull Terrier to have a predisposition to neutrophilic cholangitis, with the breed being 25.34 times more likely to acquire the condition. Other common genetic condition associated to the breed is Patellar Luxation, manifesting between the 4 month and their sixth year of life, which could permanently affect Bull Terriers life quality if left undiagnosed and untreated.

== History ==
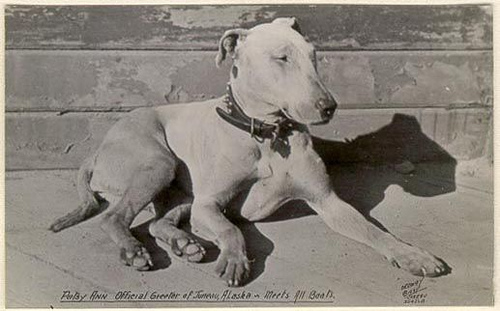
James Hinks Bull terrier

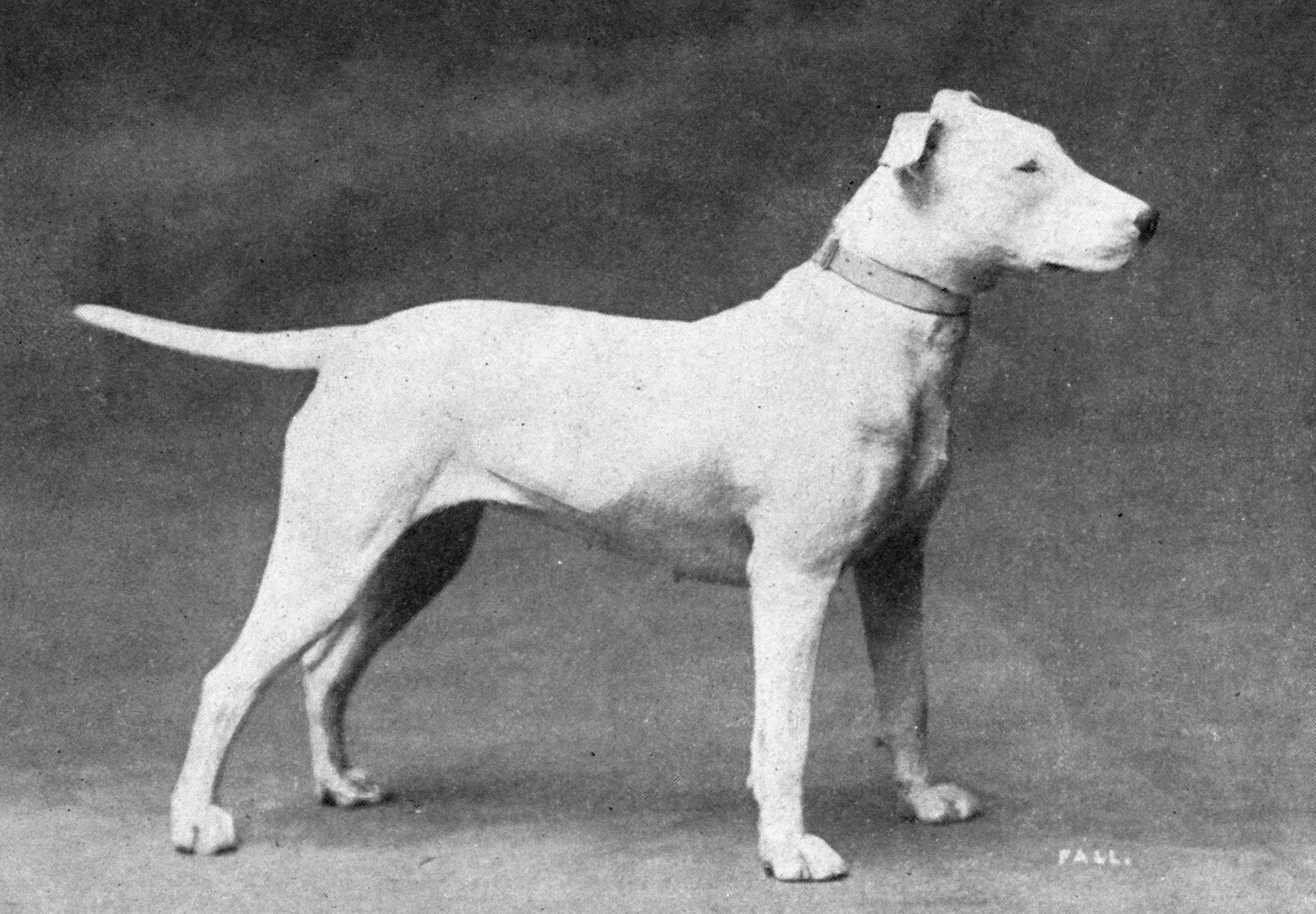
A Bull Terrier circa 1915

At the start of the 19th century, the "bull and terrier" breeds were developed to satisfy the needs for vermin control and animal-based blood sports. The bull and terriers were based on the Old English Bulldog (now extinct) and Old English Terriers with possible other terriers. This new breed combined the speed and dexterity of lightly built terriers with the dour tenacity of the Bulldog, which was a poor performer in most combat situations, having been bred almost exclusively for fighting bulls and bears tied to a post. Many breeders began to breed bulldogs with terriers, arguing that such a mixture enhances the quality of fighting. Despite the fact that a cross between a bulldog and a terrier was of high value, very little or nothing was done to preserve the breed in its original form. Due to the lack of breed standards—breeding was for performance, not appearance—the "bull and terrier" eventually divided into the ancestors of "Bull Terriers" and "Staffordshire Bull Terriers", both smaller and easier to handle than the progenitor.

In the mid-19th century, James Hinks started breeding bull and terriers with "English White Terriers" (now extinct), looking for a cleaner appearance with better legs and nicer head. In 1862, Hinks entered a dam called "Puss" sired by his white Bulldog called "Madman" into the Bull Terrier Class at the dog show held at the Cremorne Gardens in Chelsea, London. Originally, these dogs did not yet have the now-familiar "egg face", but kept the stop in the skull profile. The dog was immediately popular and breeding continued, using Dalmatian, Spanish Pointer, and Whippet to increase elegance and agility; and Borzoi and Rough Collie to reduce the stop. Hinks wanted his dogs white, and bred specifically for this. The first modern Bull Terrier is now recognized as "Lord Gladiator", from 1917, being the first dog with no stop at all.

Due to medical problems associated with all-white breeding, Ted Lyon among others began introducing colour, using Staffordshire Bull Terriers in the early 20th century. Colored Bull Terriers were recognized as a separate variety (at least by the AKC) in 1936. Brindle is the preferred colour, but other colors are welcome.

Bull Terrier

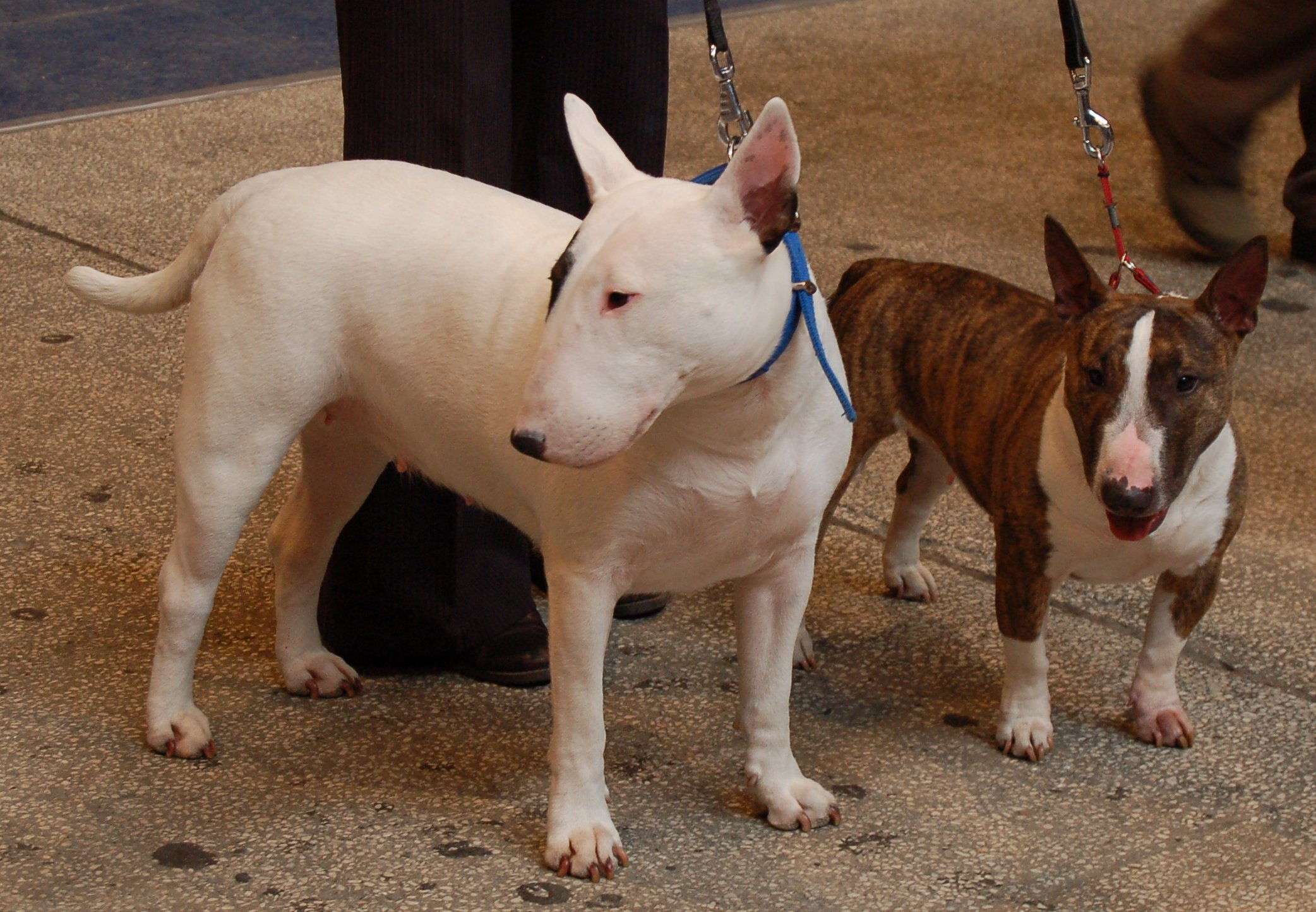
With a Miniature Bull Terrier

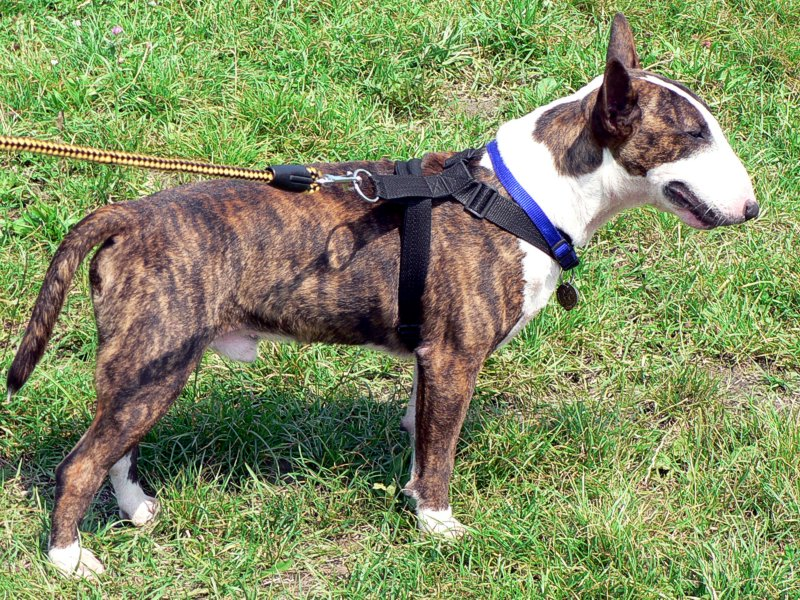
Brindle and white Bull Terrier

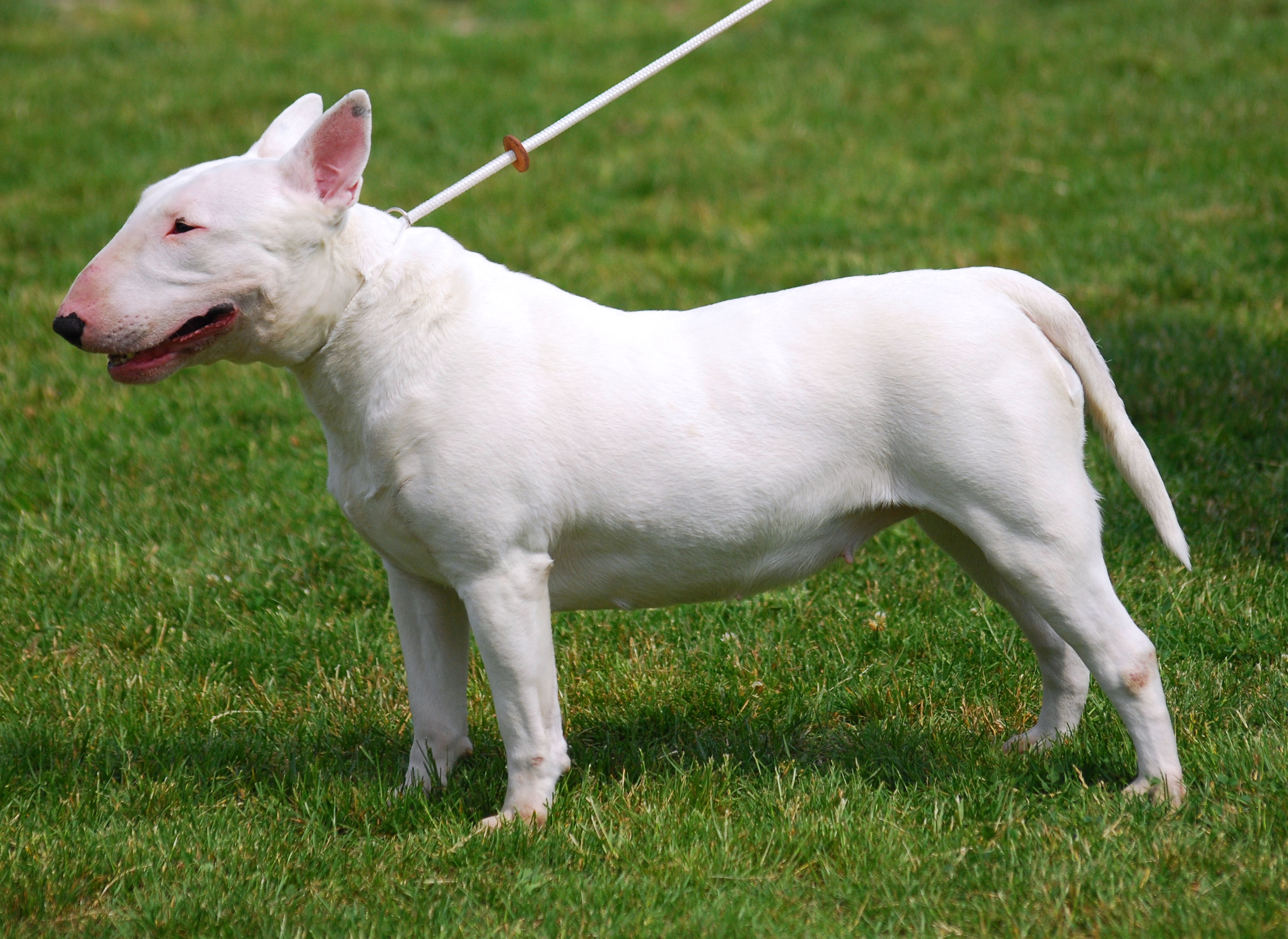
White Bull Terrier

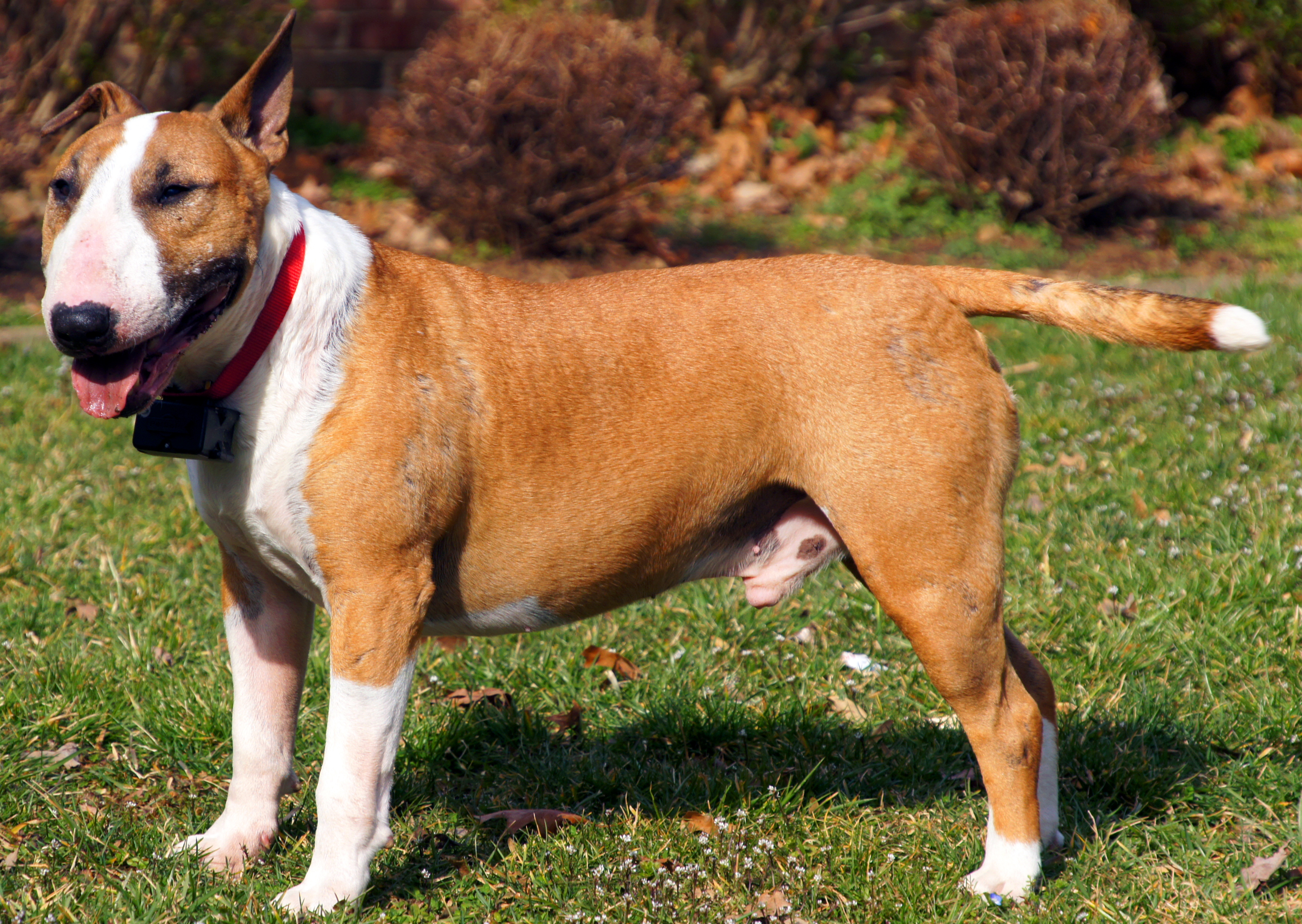
Red and white Bull Terrier

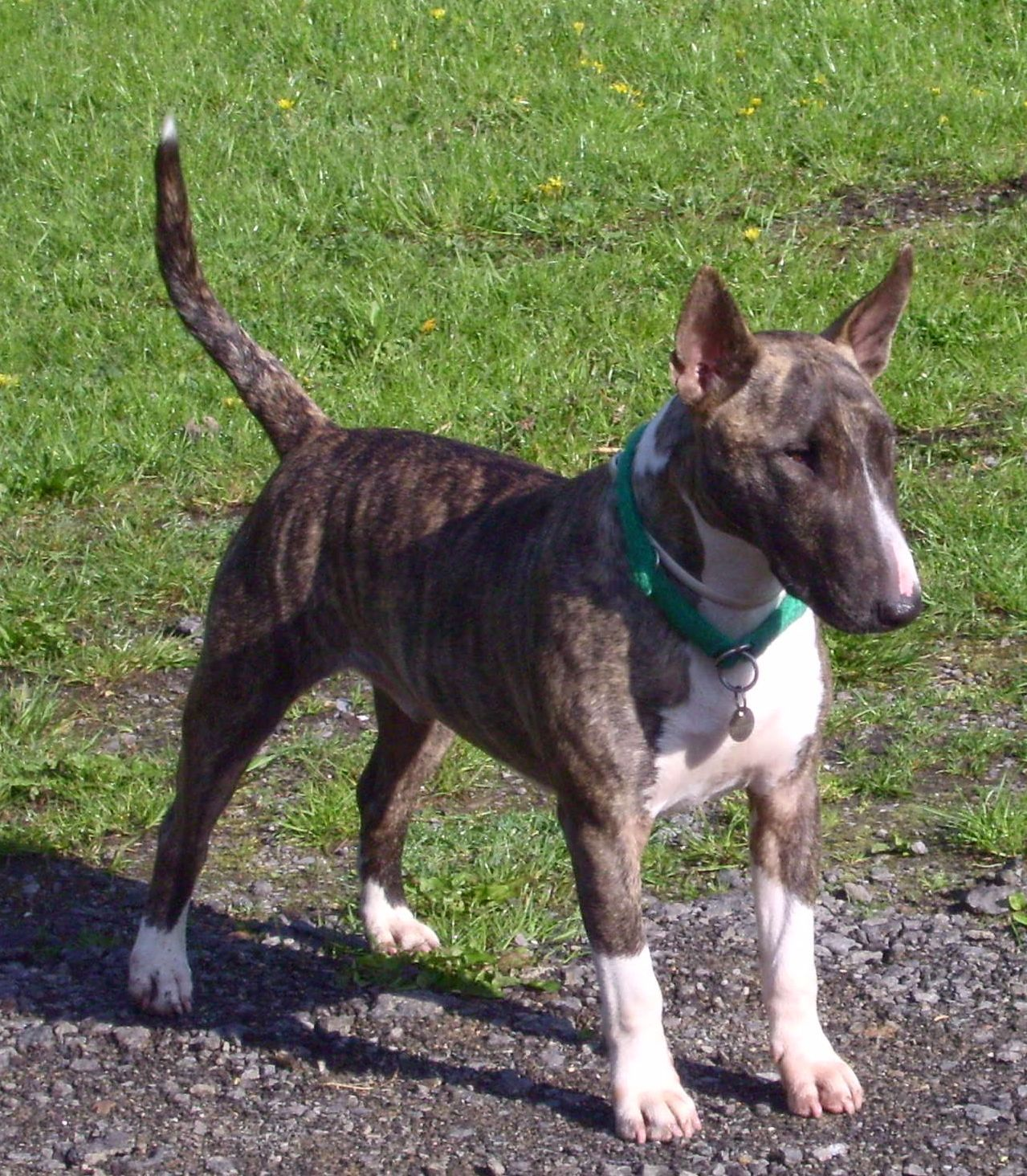
Modern-colored Bull Terrier

== Noted Bull Terriers ==
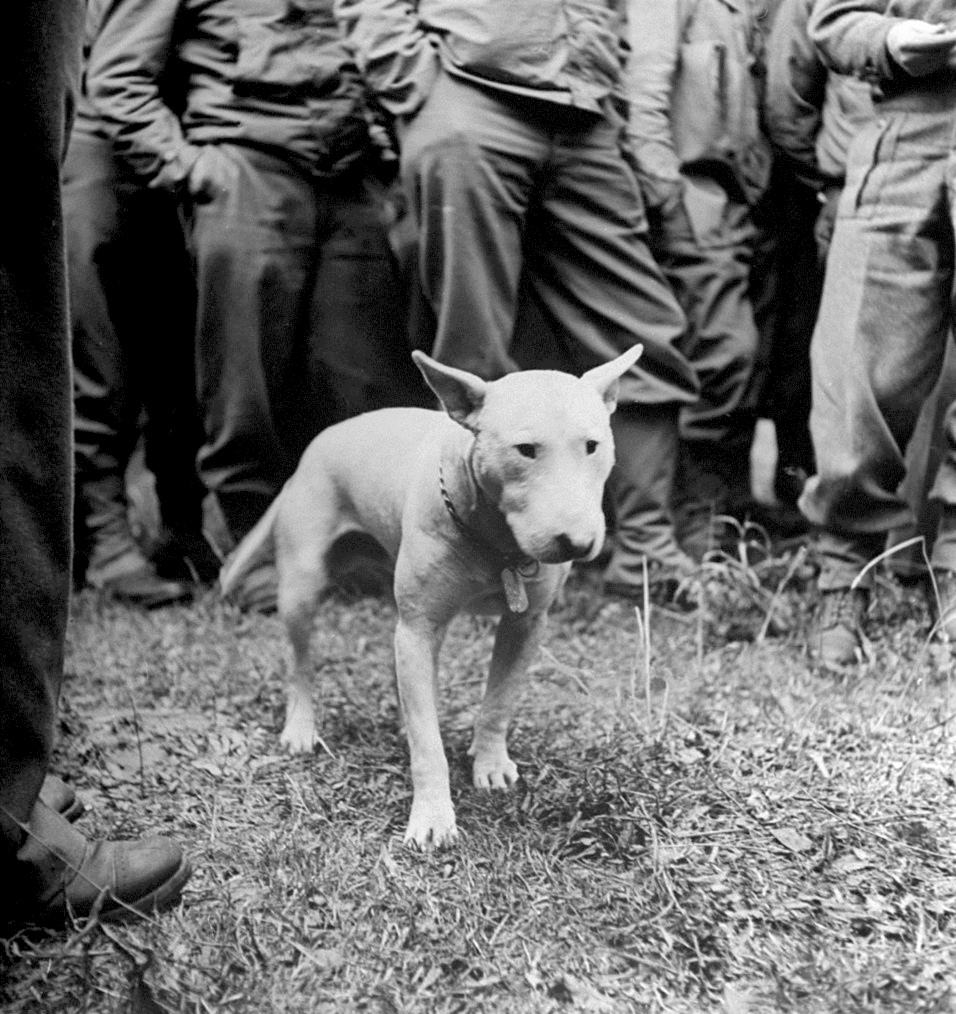
Willie, wearing his regulation Army dog tag, with General Patton and the U.S. Third Army on the drive to Paris (August 1944)

- General George S. Patton owned a Bull Terrier named Willie. The dog had belonged to a fallen RAF pilot, and Patton bought him in England in 1944. When Willie got into a fight with Dwight D. Eisenhower's Scottish Terrier dog Telek, Eisenhower said he would send Telek upstairs, but Patton apologized, saying that Telek outranked Willie, and therefore it was Willie who would be confined to quarters.
- Theodore Roosevelt owned several pets, including the Bull Terrier Pete. Pete received plenty of contemporary press, having bitten a naval clerk as well as chased and bitten the French ambassador.
- Patsy Ann (1929-1942) was a deaf Bull Terrier who lived in Juneau, Alaska, during the 1930s. She was known for predicting the arrival of ships to the harbor. A bronze statue of her stands at the harbor as a memorial to her role as the greeter of Juneau.
- In the 1963 film The Incredible Journey, based on Sheila Burnford's novel of the same name, a female Bull Terrier named Muffy played the part of Old Bodger, the eldest of the three animals.
- In the 1955 movie It's a Dog's Life, the main dog Wildfire is played by a white Bull Terrier of the same name voiced by Vic Morrow.
- Grim, the titular dog of Mother Goose and Grimm, a syndicated comic strip running since 1984, is a Bull Terrier.
- Spuds MacKenzie is a fictional character used for an extensive advertising campaign marketing Bud Light beer in the late 1980s, portrayed by a Bull Terrier named Honey Tree Evil Eye.
- Bullseye (formerly known as Spot) is a Miniature Bull Terrier and currently the official mascot of Target Corporation.
- Scud is the pet Bull Terrier of Sid Phillips, the main antagonist, in Toy Story.
- Jonah is a pet of the Binsford Family, the main character, in Family Dog.
- In the 1998 film as a bodyguard for Babe to express his gratitude for saving his life, in Babe: Pig in the City (though the film incorrectly refers to him as a Pit Bull).
- In the 2005 Clay-Animated film Philip is Victor Quartermaine's crazed pet, in Wallace and Gromit: The Curse of the Were-Rabbit.
- The 1977 novel Hell Hound by Ken Greenhall centers around a homicidal white Bull Terrier named Baxter. It was adapted as the French film Baxter (1989), in which the titular character was played by a Bull Terrier named Chimbot and voiced by Maxime Leroux.
- Gaspard and Lisa, a pair of anthropomorphised Bull Terriers who feature in a series of children's books.
- Sparky is a main character in Tim Burton's film Frankenweenie (1984), which later received an animated feature-length remake with the same title (2012).
- Spunky is the pet Bull Terrier of Rocko the Wallaby, the main protagonist in Rocko's Modern Life (1993-1996). He eats anything he sees, has a distinctive high-pitched bark, and is host to two parasites, Bloaty and Squirmy.
- In the movie Oliver Twist, Bullseye is a Bull Terrier owned by the criminal Bill Sikes. He is a loyal companion to Sikes and a reflection of his brutal nature, often seen at his side.
- Spudnick, a Bull Terrier, is a character in the American science fiction comedy film Space Buddies (2009).
- Floyd is a Bull Terrier who serves as both a pet and a sidekick to Hallmark Cards character Maxine, first appearing on greeting cards in 1986.
- Brian (Wee Bri) was an English Bull Terrier featured in many of the artworks of English artist Ray Richardson.

== See also ==
- List of dog breeds
- Miniature Bull Terrier
- Bulldog
