= Joseph Hinks =

British inventor

Joseph Hinks (1840 – 24 April 1931) was a British manufacturer, working in Birmingham. With his father, James Hinks, he patented improvements to oil lamps, marketing the resultant Duplex lamp.

Joseph was born in 1840 in Birmingham, the son of James Hinks, the lamp manufacturer. His father's career was very varied until he hit upon lamp making, and at the time of Joseph's baptism in 1844 was a licensed victualler.

Joseph worked for his father as a lamp manufacturer from about the time he was 17 (in about 1857) and by 1861 he was recorded as a manufacturer in the same terms as his father. By 1862 the business was called "James Hinks and Son". They operated from the Crystal Lamp Works on the corner of Great Hampton Street and Hockley Street, Birmingham. The great selling point of their lamps was that they did not need frequent trimming or give off nasty smoke or smells. In 1864 they developed the "Patent Duplex Lamp", which used two wicks instead of the usual one, and gave out twice the light.

The company was incorporated in 1873 (and re-incorporated in 1896). Newspaper reports suggest that James retired as managing director and became chairman in about 1897–98, when Joseph took over. The firm had bases in London and Birmingham. Important customers included railway companies, which used oil lamps to light stations, trains and signals. They also developed specialist lamps and hurricane lanterns for India which was one of their most lucrative markets. With an eye to the domestic market, Hinks' lamps were also decorative and borrowing from the designs of beautiful European china and porcelain table decorations their lamps were also a byword for domestic beauty, so much so that there is still a flourishing market for antique Hinks' lamps. Hinks lamps were state-of-the-art until the early 20th century when electric lighting became the norm.

Joseph married Frances Dain (1843–1928) in 1865 in Aston; they had eight children. The family moved to Leamington Spa in the 1870s, and Joseph served as mayor of Leamington in 1890 and 1892. He was also a borough magistrate and alderman. He took over the family business in 1898 when his father retired. Joseph's son, Harry, became managing director in 1901 when Joseph moved into the chairman role.

Joseph died on 24 April 1931 at Orkney Cottage, Taplow, Buckinghamshire. When he died his estate valued at about £111,000 [about £7m in today's money].

During his lifetime he was described as a "dapper little man with the bearing of a distinguished soldier rather than a quick-witted inventor or a successful man of business". During the First World War the firm made mess tins, hand grenades and shell components. After the war, competition from the US and an increase in the cost of raw materials led to a business decline. The factory closed after 1929 and the old factory was pulled down in the 1930s.

== Bibliography ==
- Hinks, James; Hinks, Joseph (28 December 1867). "Lamp For burning petroleum". Scientific American. 17 (26).
- Shill, Ray (2002). Birmingham's Industrial Heritage: 1900–2000. Stroud: Sutton. ISBN 0750925930.
