= Miniature Bull Terrier =

English Miniature Bull Terrier
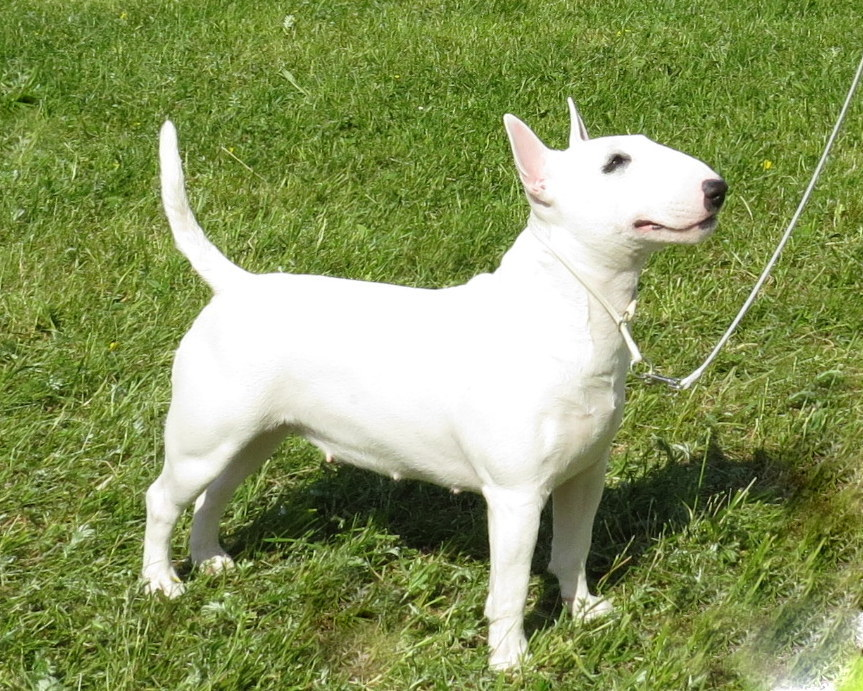
- English Miniature Bull Terrier
- Other names: Mini Bull
- Origin: England
Traits
- Height: Not to exceed 35.4 cm (14 in)
- Coat: Short, flat, even, and harsh to touch
- Colour: White, black, brindle, red, fawn and tricolour
Kennel club standards
- The Kennel Club: standard
- Fédération Cynologique Internationale: standard

The Miniature Bull Terrier is a breed with origins in the extinct English White Terrier, the Dalmatian and the Bulldog. The first existence is documented in 1872 in The Dogs of British Island.

== Description ==
=== Appearance ===
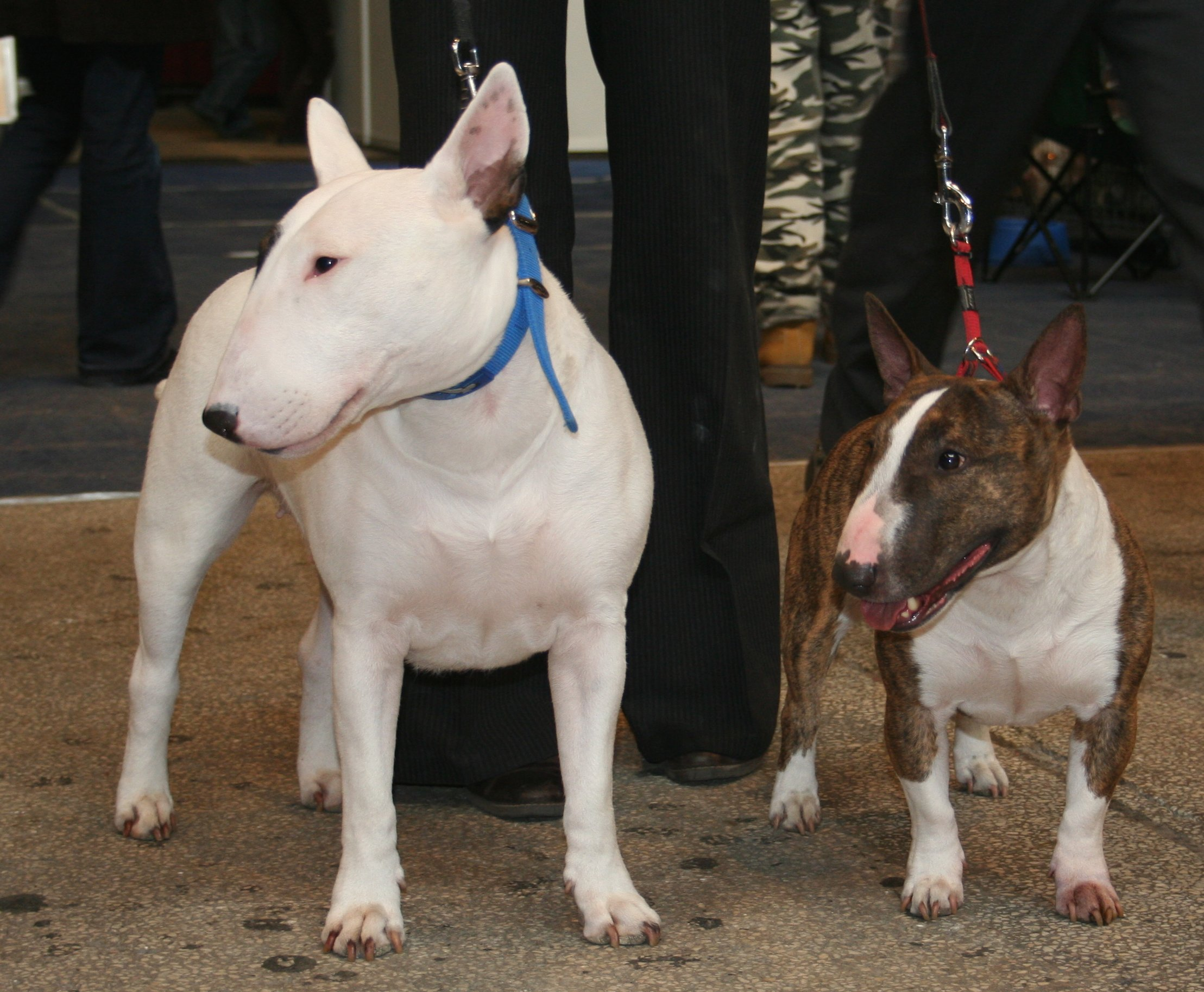
Standard Bull Terrier on the left, Mini Bull on the right

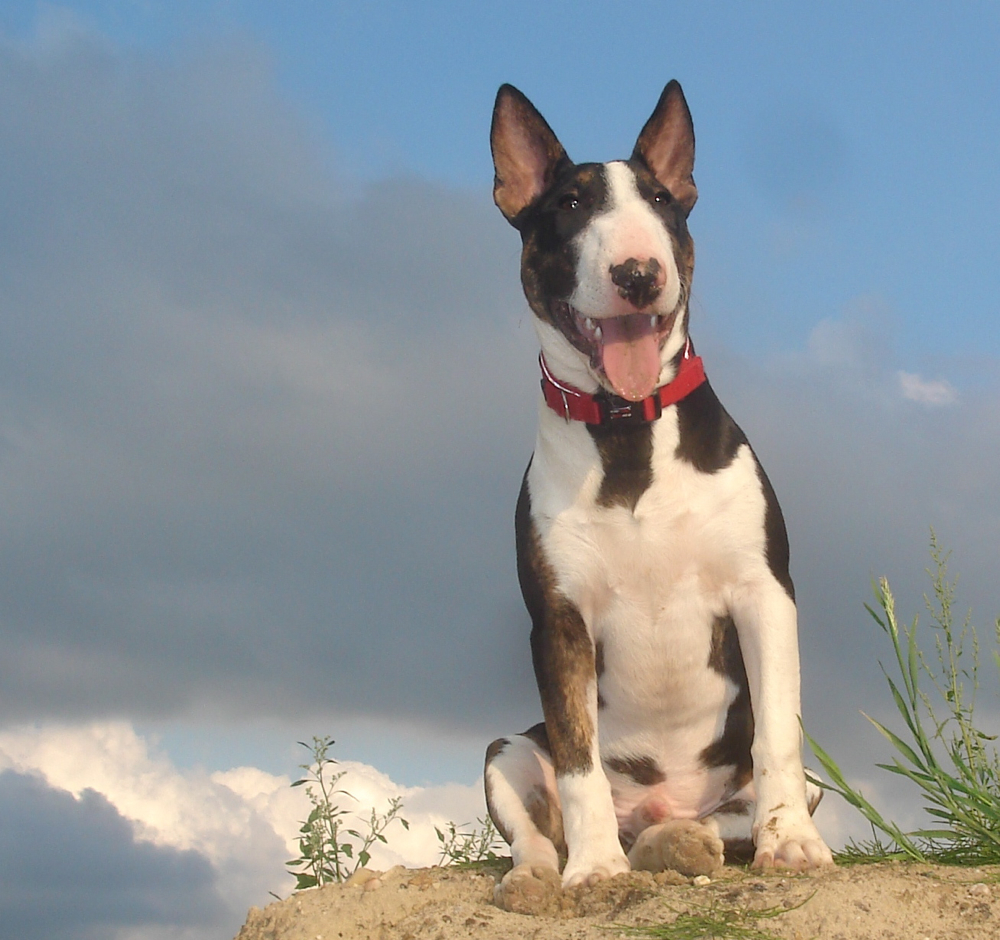
Miniature Bull Terrier in black, white and tan (tricolour)

Miniature Bull Terriers have short, fine, and glossy coats that are very close to the skin, like Bull Terriers. They are accepted in the ring to be white, white with another colour, or fully coloured. However, like the Bull Terriers, any blue or liver-coloured coats are undesirable. These dogs require minimal grooming.

In the early 1900s, the difference between the breeds was determined by the dog's weight. However, this led to Miniature Bull Terriers becoming so small and fine that they looked more like a Chihuahua than a Bull Terrier. So, in the 1970s, the weight limit was replaced with a height limit of under fourteen inches. They are usually no smaller than ten inches. According to the AKC, miniature bull terriers' weight must be proportionate to its height. However, they tend to range from 20 to 35 lbs.

The Miniature Bull Terriers have muscular shoulders and a full body. Similar to the Bull Terrier, they have a head described as "egg-shaped". It is flat on top with a large nose. The eyes are triangular and closely set. The ears are erect and typically not cropped or otherwise altered. Miniature Bull Terriers tend to carry their tails horizontally as opposed to vertically.

=== Temperament ===
Miniature Bull Terriers are commonly described as stubborn and courageous. Despite their diminutive stature, they tend to challenge larger dog breeds. However, as with any dog, owners can reduce the likelihood of confrontations by providing appropriate training. They are described as energetic and playful, but require care due to their unpredictable nature around other dogs.

== Health ==
A 2024 UK study found a life expectancy of 12.2 years for the breed compared to an average of 12.7 for purebreeds and 12 for crossbreeds.

Deafness occurs in both colored and white Miniature Bull Terriers. Puppies can be born unilaterally deaf (deaf in one ear) or bilaterally deaf (deaf in both ears). Deaf dogs should not be bred due to deafness being hereditary. BAEP (or BAER) testing is done on puppies prior to sale to discover which puppies have hearing problems.

Lethal acrodermatitis, also known as Acrodermatitis of the Bull Terrier, is a rare genodermatosis monogenic autosomal inherited disease found exclusively in white Bull Terriers (including the miniature Bull Terrier). The condition is usually fatal and is characterised by poor growth, decreased serum copper and zinc levels, immunodeficiency, bronchopneumonia, skin lesions, and erosions on the distal extremities. Other symptoms that occur later on include crusting, papules, pustules, erythema, hyperkeratosis, and colour dilution. The condition manifests within the first few weeks of life and most puppies affected die before the age of 2. Their size is roughly half of their unaffected litter mates at a year old. Unlike the human condition acrodermatitis enteropathica, zinc supplementation does not improve symptoms.

The Miniature Bull Terrier is one of the more commonly affected breeds for primary lens luxation which is caused by an autosomal recessive mutation of the ADAMTS17 gene.

== History ==
When the Bull Terrier breed was first created in 19th century England, it was about the same size as the Miniature Bull Terrier. Miniature Bull Terriers were granted membership in the American Kennel Club (AKC) on 14 May 1991 (effective 1 January 1992).

== See also ==
- List of dog breeds
- Bull Terrier
