= English White Terrier =

Extinct dog breed

White English terrier
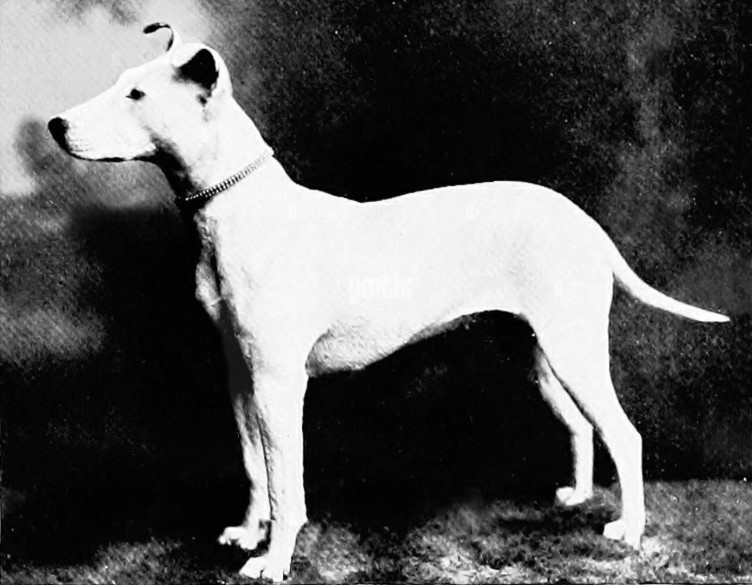
- The New Book of Dogs - Natural History of British Dogs and Their Foreign Relatives (1907)
- Other names: White English Terrier; Old English Terrier; British White Terrier
- Origin: Britain
- Breed status: Extinct

The English White Terrier (also known as the White English Terrier) is an extinct breed of dog. "English White Terrier" is the failed show ring name of a pricked-ear form of the white fox-working terriers that have existed in Great Britain since the late 18th century.

The name was invented and embraced in the early 1860s by a handful of breeders anxious to create a new breed from a prick-eared version of the small white working terriers that were later developed into the Fox Terrier, the Jack Russell Terrier, the Sealyham Terrier and later, in the United States, the Boston Terrier and the Rat Terrier. In the end, however, the Kennel Club hierarchy decided the "English White Terrier" was a distinction without a difference, while the dog's genetic problems made it unpopular with the public. Within 30 years of appearing on the Kennel Club scene, the English White Terrier had slipped into extinction. However, in Britain it was crossbred with the Old English Bulldog to give rise to the Boston Terrier and Bull and Terriers.

== Breed history ==
Small bred working terriers have existed in Great Britain since at least the late 18th century. These dogs have always been variable in size and shape, with dogs ranging in size from 10 to 15 inches, and with both drop ears and prick ears, smooth, broken, and rough coats.(Burns, 2005)

With the rise of dog shows in the 1860s, breed-fancy enthusiasts raced to name and "improve" every type of dog they could find, and terriers were at the very top of their list. From the long-extant white-bodied working terriers came the Fox terrier, the Jack Russell terrier, the Parson Russell terrier, and the Sealyham terrier.

In the rush to create and claim new breeds, competing groups of dog breeders sometimes came up with different names for the same dog, and it was common for entirely fictional breed histories to be cobbled up as part of a campaign to declare a new breed and create a bit of personal distinction for a dog's originator (to say nothing of sales).

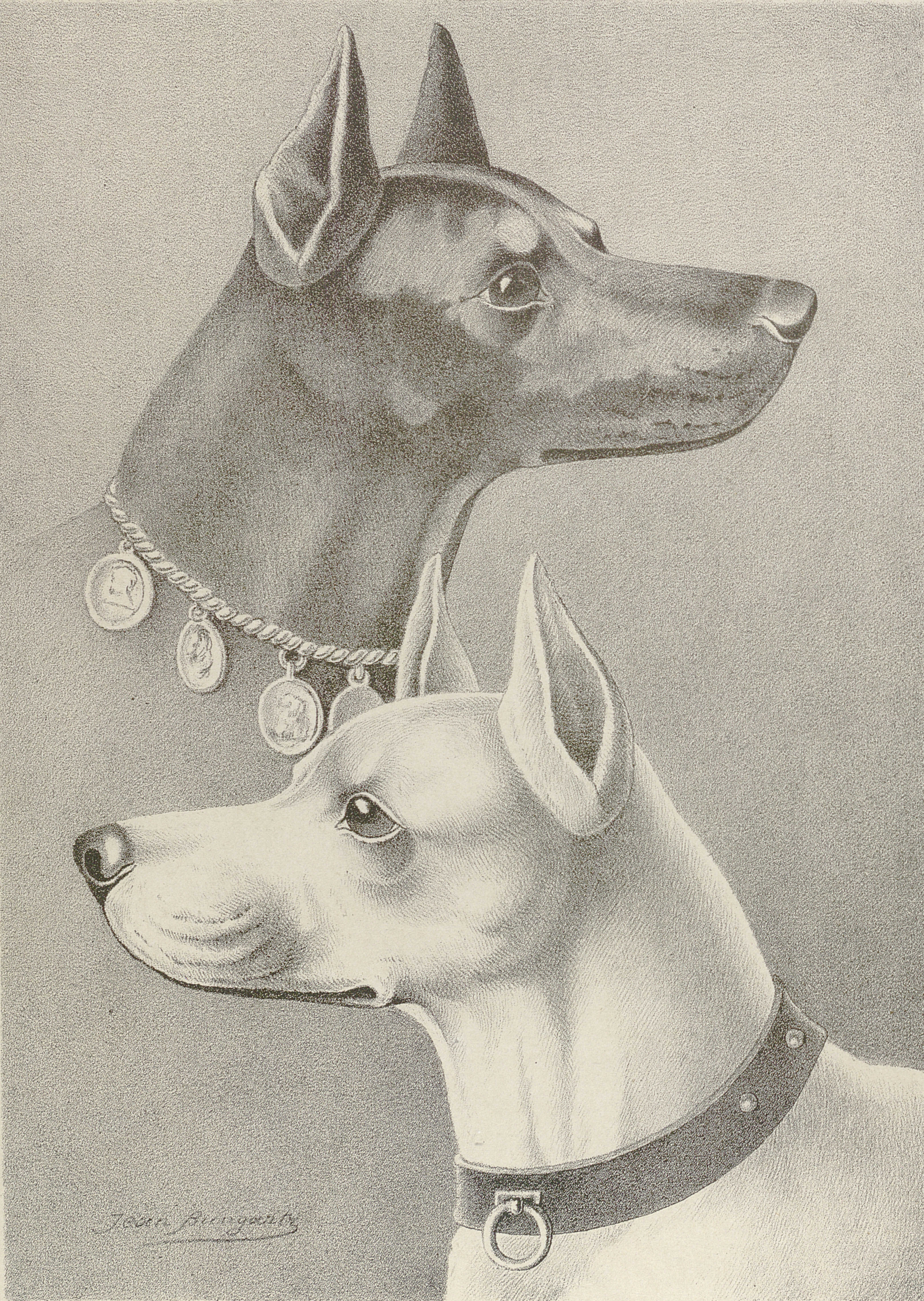
English White Terrier with Black and Tan Terrier on an 1890 illustration

In the 1860s and 1870s, a small group of dog show enthusiasts tried to claim that prick-eared versions of white working terriers were an entirely different breed from those same dogs with dropped ears. The problems with this claim were legion, however. For one thing, prick and drop-eared dogs were often found in the same litter, while entirely white dogs had a propensity for deafness and were therefore nearly useless in the field. (Briggs, 1894)

In 1894, Rawdon Briggs Lee wondered, in his book Modern Dogs, about the relatively recent origin of the "English White Terrier" and noted that, "It has been surmised that the original English White Terrier had been a fox terrier crossed with a white Italian greyhound" (i.e. a toy breed).

Lee noted that at the London dog shows where the breed first appeared in 1863–1864, the dogs were presented in two classes: "one being for dogs and bitches under six or seven pounds weight, as the case may be; the other for dogs and bitches over that standard."

In 1894, about the time that English White Terriers finally disappeared from the Kennel Club scene (it was always a pet and show dog, and never a working dog), Lee noted that "The most recent London-bred specimens I have seen have been comparative toys, under 10lb. in weight, and with a rounded skull, or so-called 'apple head," which so persists in making its appearance in lilliputian specimens of the dog – an effect of inbreeding."

Though Lee included a club description of the dog claiming the dog could be found as heavy as 20 lbs in weight, Lee (a noted Kennel Club judge and Kennel Editor of The Field sport hunting magazine) took the trouble to note that "As a matter of fact, I do not ever remember seeing a really so-called pure English White Terrier up to 20 lbs, the maximum allowed by the club."

Lee describes the English White Terrier as "the most fragile and delicate of all our terriers," noting that "he is not a sportsman's companion," but that he "makes a nice house dog" but "requires a considerable amount of cuddling and care."

Lee notes that at some of the early dog shows "some of the specimens were shaped more like an Italian greyhound than as a terrier" and that the dog "is particularly subject to total or partial deafness."

Though the dog still existed as a breed in 1894, Briggs could see the writing on the wall and did not bemoan the possible extinction of this show-ring failure: "While regretting extremely the decay of the White English Terrier, I am afraid they must bow to the inevitable, and give place to dogs better suited to the wants and conveniences of the present day than they unfortunately are."

== Appearance ==
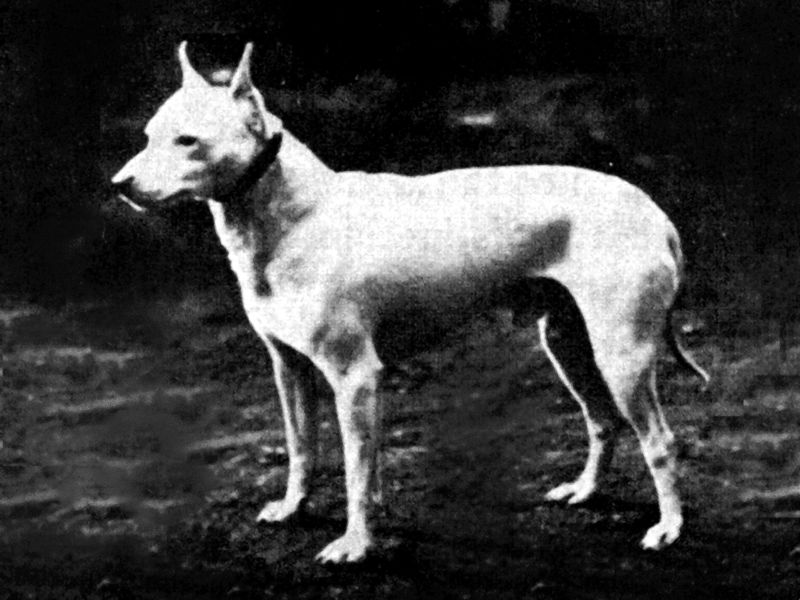
English White Terrier (1890)

From Modern Dogs by Rawdon Briggs Lee (1894):

The description of the white English terrier is drawn up by the club as follows; the table of points is not issued by the club, but the figures, in my opinion, indicate the numerical value of each point, and not carried higher than the back.

- COAT: Close, hard, short, and glossy.
- COLOUR: Pure white, coloured marking to disqualify.
- CONDITION: Flesh and muscles to be hard and firm.
- WEIGHT: From 12 lb. to 20 lb.

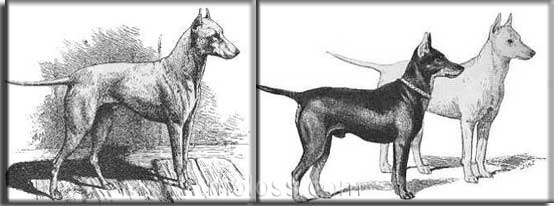
Old English terrier with Black and Tan terrier

=== Silvio ===
Alfred Benjamin owned a male Old English terrier, named 'Silvio' (born 1876). It was well-shown and considered a prime specimen of the breed. In 1877, Silvio won conformation shows at Bath, Royal Agricultural Hall, Darlington, Alexandra Palace and in 1878 at Wolverhampton. Silvio weighed nineteen pounds with the following measurements:

Silvios' Measurements
Area	Inches
Nose to stop	3
Stop to occiput	4.5
Length of back	15
Girth of muzzle	7
Girth of skull	12
Girth of brisket	19
Girth round shoulders	19.5
Girth of loin	16
Girth of forearm	3.75
Girth of pastern	3
Height at shoulders	18
Height at loin	18.5

=== Judging ===
Scale For Judging Old English terriers
Area	Value
Head, including jaws, nose, ears and eyes	10
Legs	5
Feet	5
Body	5
Colour	10
General appearance	10
Action	5
TOTAL	50
