= The Field (magazine) =

British field sports monthly magazine

- Cover of the August 2024 issue
- Editor: Alexandra Henton
- Categories: Field sports
- Frequency: Monthly
- Circulation: 28,294 (ABC Jan – Dec 2013); Print and digital editions.
- First issue: 1853; 173 years ago
- Company: Future plc
- Country: United Kingdom
- Language: English
- Website: thefield.co.uk

The Field is a British monthly magazine about country matters and field sports. It was started as a weekly magazine in 1853, and has remained in print since then; Robert Smith Surtees was among the founders. In the nineteenth century, it was known as Field: The Country Gentleman's Newspaper. The magazine is one of the earliest hobby magazines. It is published by Future plc.

== Editors of The Field ==
- 1853–1857: Mark Lemon
- 1857–1888: John Henry Walsh
- 1888–1899: Frederick Toms
- 1900–1910: William Senior
- 1910–1928: Sir Theodore Andrea Cook
- 1931–1937: Eric Parker
- 1938–1946: Brian Vesey-Fitzgerald
- 1947–1950: Leonard V. Dodds
- 1951–1977: Wilson Stephens
- 1977–1984: Derek Bingham
- 1984–1987: Simon Courtauld
- 1987–1991: Julie Spencer
- 1991–2020: Jonathan Young
- 2020–present: Alexandra Henton

== Hunting and racing editors ==
- 1928–1936: William Fawcett
