= John Henry Walsh =

English sports writer (1810–1888)

John Henry Walsh FRCS (21 October 1810 – 12 February 1888) was an English sports writer born in Hackney, London who wrote under the pseudonym "Stonehenge."

Walsh was educated in private schools and became a fellow of the Royal College of Surgeons in 1844. He worked as a surgeon for several years, but gradually changed his profession after his written works on rural sports became successful. He relocated from the country to London in 1852. The following year he published his first important book, The Greyhound (3rd ed. 1875), a collection of papers originally contributed to Bell's Life.

In November 1855, his comprehensive and illustrated Manual of British Rural Sports was published and was enthusiastically received. This was the first of many editions. In April 1856 the second edition was published which corrected minor errors. In the same year he joined the staff of The Field, and became its editor at the close of 1857. Among his numerous books published under the name of "Stonehenge" are:

- The Shot-Gun and Sporting Rifle (1859)
- The Dog in Health and Disease (1859; 4th ed. 1887)
- The Horse in the Stable and in the Field (1861; 13th ed. 1890)
- Dogs of the British Isles (1867; 3rd ed. 1885)
- The Modern Sportsman's Gun and Rifle (1882–1884)

He was editor of The Field, a magazine whose target audience was the upper class of English society, and those who loved to shoot, fish, and hunt. It was never a pure hunting magazine, but was always concerned with social status; its influence led to the creation of the Kennel Club. Walsh instituted a series of trials of guns, rifles, and sporting gunpowders. These extended over many years, and contributed to the development of sporting firearms. His influence upon all branches of sport was stimulating and beneficial.

== Biography ==
John Henry Walsh, son of Benjamin Walsh, was born in Hackney, London, on 21 October 1810. He was educated at a private school. In 1832, he passed as a member of the Royal College of Surgeons, and became a fellow of the college, by examination, in 1844. For some time, he was surgeon at the Ophthalmic Institution and lectured on surgery and descriptive anatomy at the Aldersgate School of Medicine. For several years he practiced medicine at Worcester, but returned to London in 1852.

He loved sports; he rode well to hounds, kept greyhounds and entered them at coursing meetings, and trained his own pointers and setters. He also trained hawks. He became adept in the management of dogs, and few veterinary practitioners could compare with him in the treatment of dogs' diseases. He was also fond of shooting, and lost a part of his left hand as a result of his gun bursting.

In 1853, under the pseudonym of "Stonehenge," he released his first work, entitled The Greyhound: On the art of breeding, rearing, and training greyhounds for public running, and their diseases and treatment (3rd ed. 1875). This treatise was based on articles he had written in Bell's Life, and it remains the standard textbook on the subject. Three years later, in 1856, his articles appeared in Manual of British Rural Sports which deals with the whole cycle of sports and the scientific breeding of horses. Sixteen editions of this work were published up to 1886, with later editions containing articles on special subjects furnished by other writers. In 1856, he originated the Coursing Calendar and conducted it through fifty half-yearly volumes.

Around 1856, he was connected with The Field and at the end of 1857 accepted its editorship. He wrote several books; The Shot-Gun and Sporting Rifle, and the Dogs, Ponies, Ferrets, &c., used with them in Shooting and Trapping and The Dog in Health and Disease (4th ed. 1887) in 1859; The Horse in the Stable and in the Field in 1861 (13th ed. 1890); and The Dogs of the British Islands in 1867 (3rd ed. 1886). In the last two books, he also had the assistance of other writers. In 1882–4 the Modern Sportsman's Gun and Rifle was published with its first volume devoted to shotguns, while volume two dealt with rifles.

He was a very ambitious person. His activity in conducting The Field, with the aid of many able coadjutors, was remarkable. He soon instituted the first Field trial of guns and rifles, in April 1858 in the Ashburnham grounds at Chelsea, adjacent to the famous Cremorne Gardens. This trial wound up the controversy about the rival merits of breech-loaders and muzzle-loaders, but before the final decision, two other trials were held, one at the old Hornsey Wood Tavern in July 1859, and the third at the Lillie Arms, Brompton, in 1866.

In 1875, the value of the choke-bore system received further elucidation in another trial at the All England Croquet Club grounds at Wimbledon, of which Walsh was an active promoter. The trial extended over six weeks, with the entire proceedings being carried out under the editor's personal supervision.

Again, in 1878, he endeavoured to make clear the respective merits of Schultze and black powder. Besides conducting the actual competition, he carried out numerous experiments himself. One of the consequences was that light pressure with Schultze was found to produce better shooting than tight ramming, while tight wads to prevent the escape of gas and the general system known as the 'Field' loading also resulted. Other experiments led to his invention of the 'Field' force gauge, which gave more reliable results than the paper pads previously in use.

In 1879, another gun trial was carried out to determine the merits of 12-bores, 16-bores, and 20-bores.

In 1883, he instituted the rifle trial at Putney to demonstrate the accuracy of shooting of Express rifles at a target, and to ascertain, by measurement, the height of the trajectories of weapons differing in bore and in the charge used. Subsequently, Walsh organised trials to ascertain the cause of so many breakages in guns, the testing of powders by the lead cylinder method, the various effects of nitro compounds, and the strain on the barrels of small bores. His comments on proof powder in The Field, where he stated that the powder used in testing gun-barrels was fifty per cent below the proof required, led to an action, the Birmingham Proof-house Guardians v. Walsh. On technical grounds, a verdict was decided against Walsh with damages of forty shillings (The Times, 3 July - 10 August 1885). As soon as the trial was over, he approached the Guardians with proposals for providing security for sportsmen, and ultimately succeeded in obtaining some useful changes.

Walsh was one of the founders of the National Coursing Club and of the All England Lawn Tennis Club. He was heavily involved with the early dog shows and field trials, and was on the committee of the Kennel Club. He was a good chess player, and served on the committees of several clubs.

Walsh died at 43 Montserrat Road, Putney, Surrey, on 12 February 1888, aged 77, and was buried on 16 February in Putney Vale Cemetery at Putney Common. He married three times : first, in August 1833, to Margaret, daughter of Thomas Stevenson of Claines, Worcestershire, who died nine months later; next, in 1835, to Susan Emily, daughter of Dr. Malden of Worcester, who died eight months later; and, finally, in 1852, to Louisa, the eldest of the Rev. William Parker, who survived her husband. He left two daughters.

== Works ==
In addition to the books already mentioned, Walsh wrote:

- The Economical Housewife, being Practical Advice for Brewing … to which are added Directions for the Management of the Dairy, 1857.
- A Manual of Domestic Economy suited to Families spending from 100l. to 1,000l. a year, 1857, 4th edit. 1890.
- A Manual of Domestic Medicine and Surgery, 1858.
- Riding and Driving, 1863.
- Pedestrianism, Health and General Training, 1866.
- The Modern Sportsman's Gun and Rifle, including Game and Wild Fowl Guns, Sporting and Match Rifles and Revolvers, 1882–4, 2 vols.
- A Table of Calculations for use with the Field Force Gauge for Testing Shot Guns, 1882.

Walsh edited:

- The English Cookery Book, containing many unpublished receipts in daily use by Private Families, collected by a Committee of Ladies, 1858;
- the second edition was entitled The British Cookery Book, 1883.

With William Harcourt Ranking Walsh, edited:

- The Provincial Medical and Surgical Journal, 1849–52;

With John George Wood Walsh, edited:

- Archery, Fencing, and Broadsword, 1863,
- Athletic Sports and Manly Exercises, 1864.
