= Pit bull =

Type of dog

Pit bull type
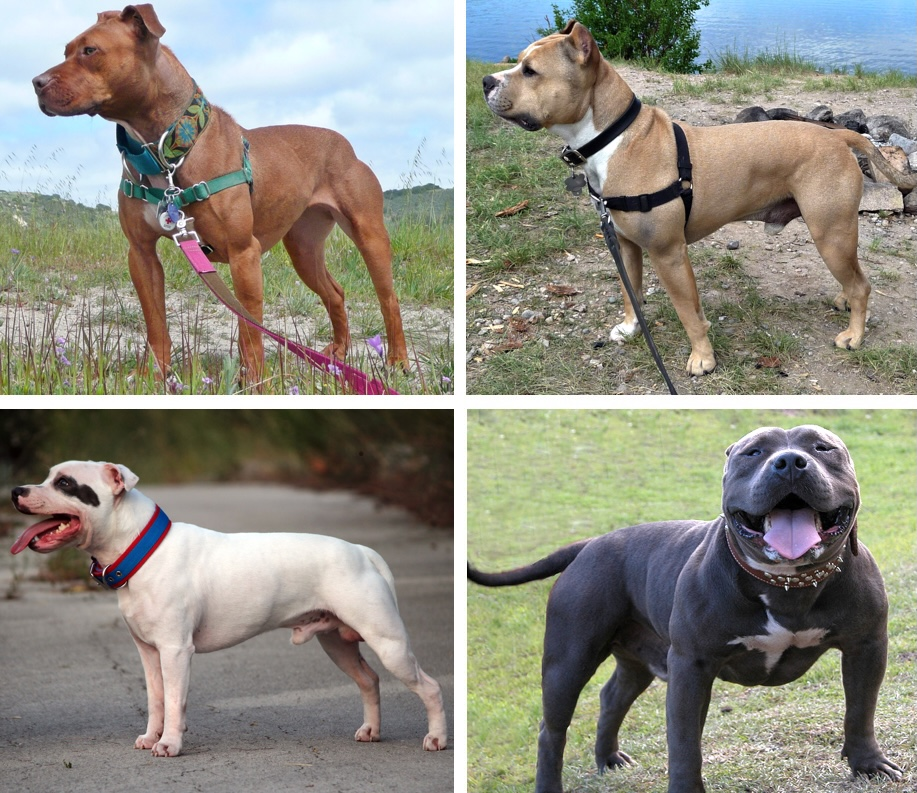
- A selection of dog breeds sometimes classified as pit bull types. Clockwise from top left: American Pit Bull Terrier, American Staffordshire Terrier, American Bully, Staffordshire Bull Terrier.
- Origin: United States, Great Britain

Pit bull is an umbrella term for several types of dog believed to have descended from bull and terriers. In the United States, the term is usually considered to include the American Pit Bull Terrier, American Staffordshire Terrier, Staffordshire Bull Terrier, American Bully, and sometimes the Bull Terrier, along with any crossbred dog that shares certain physical characteristics with these breeds. In other countries, including the United Kingdom, the term is used specifically for the American Pit Bull Terrier, excluding the Staffordshire Bull Terrier. Most pit bull–type dogs descend from the British bull and terrier, a 19th-century dog-fighting type developed from crosses between the Old English Bulldog and the Old English Terrier.

Pit bull–type dogs have a controversial reputation as pets internationally, due to their history in dog fighting, the number of high-profile attacks documented in the media over decades, and their proclivity to latch on while biting. Proponents of the type and advocates of regulation have engaged in a contentious nature-versus-nurture debate over whether aggressive tendencies in pit bulls may be appropriately attributed to owners' poor care for and competency to handle the dog or inherent qualities owing to their breeding for fighting purposes. While some studies have argued that pit bull–type dogs are not disproportionately dangerous, offering competing interpretations on dog bite statistics, independent North American organizations have published statistics from hospital records showing pit bulls are responsible for more than half of reported dog bite incidents among all breeds, despite comprising only 6% of pet dogs. Some insurance companies will not cover pit bulls (along with Rottweilers and wolf hybrids) because these particular dogs cause a disproportionate rate of bite incidents. Dog bite severity varies by the breed of dog, and studies have found that pit bull–type dogs have both a high rate of reported bites and a high rate of severe injuries, compared to other non–pit bull–type dogs.

Pit bull–type dogs are extensively used in the United States for dog fighting, a practice that has continued despite becoming illegal. Several nations and jurisdictions restrict the ownership of pit bull–type dogs through breed-specific legislation. A pro–pit bull lobby exists that promotes pit bulls as family pets, advocates for and funds pit bull research, and opposes laws that regulate their ownership.

== History ==
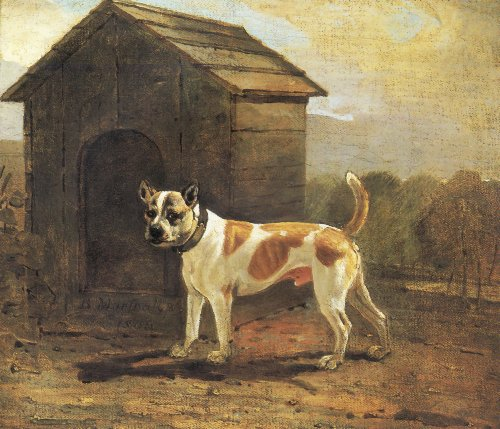
Early 19th century bull-and-terrier

The term has been used since at least the early 20th century. It is believed all dogs that are now classified as pit bulls descend from the British bull-and-terrier, which were first imported into North America in the 1870s. The bull-and-terrier was a breed of dog developed in the United Kingdom in the early 19th century for the blood sports of dog fighting and rat baiting. It was created by crossing the ferocious, thickly muscled Old English Bulldog with the agile, lithe, feisty Black and Tan Terrier. The aggressive Old English Bulldog, which was bred for bear and bull baiting, was often also pitted against its own kind in organized dog fights, but it was found that lighter, faster dogs were better suited to dogfighting than the heavier Bulldog. To produce a lighter, faster, more agile dog that retained the courage and tenacity of the Bulldog, outcrosses from local terriers were tried, and ultimately found to be successful.

As it was in the UK, dog fighting became a popular pastime in 19th century America and bull-and-terriers were imported to the New World to pursue the blood sport. In the United States, organized dog fights have been progressively outlawed in various states since 1874, culminating in federal legislation criminalizing animal fighting in 2007.

In the 1890s breeders of American pit bull–type dogs attempted to have their dogs recognized by the American Kennel Club, but because of the type's association with dogfighting, the club rejected these entreaties. Following this rejection, in 1898 breeders of American Pit Bull Terriers established a rival kennel club, the United Kennel Club. In addition to being a breed registry, the United Kennel Club also regulated dogfights. In the 1930s the American Kennel Club was faced with a dilemma: whilst not wishing to condone dogfighting, there was a desire to recognize a uniquely American dog breed for which over 30 years of breed records existed. The solution was to recognize Pit Bull Terriers under a different name and prohibit these dogs from being used in organized fights, and in 1935 the American Kennel Club recognized Pit Bull Terriers as Staffordshire Terriers.

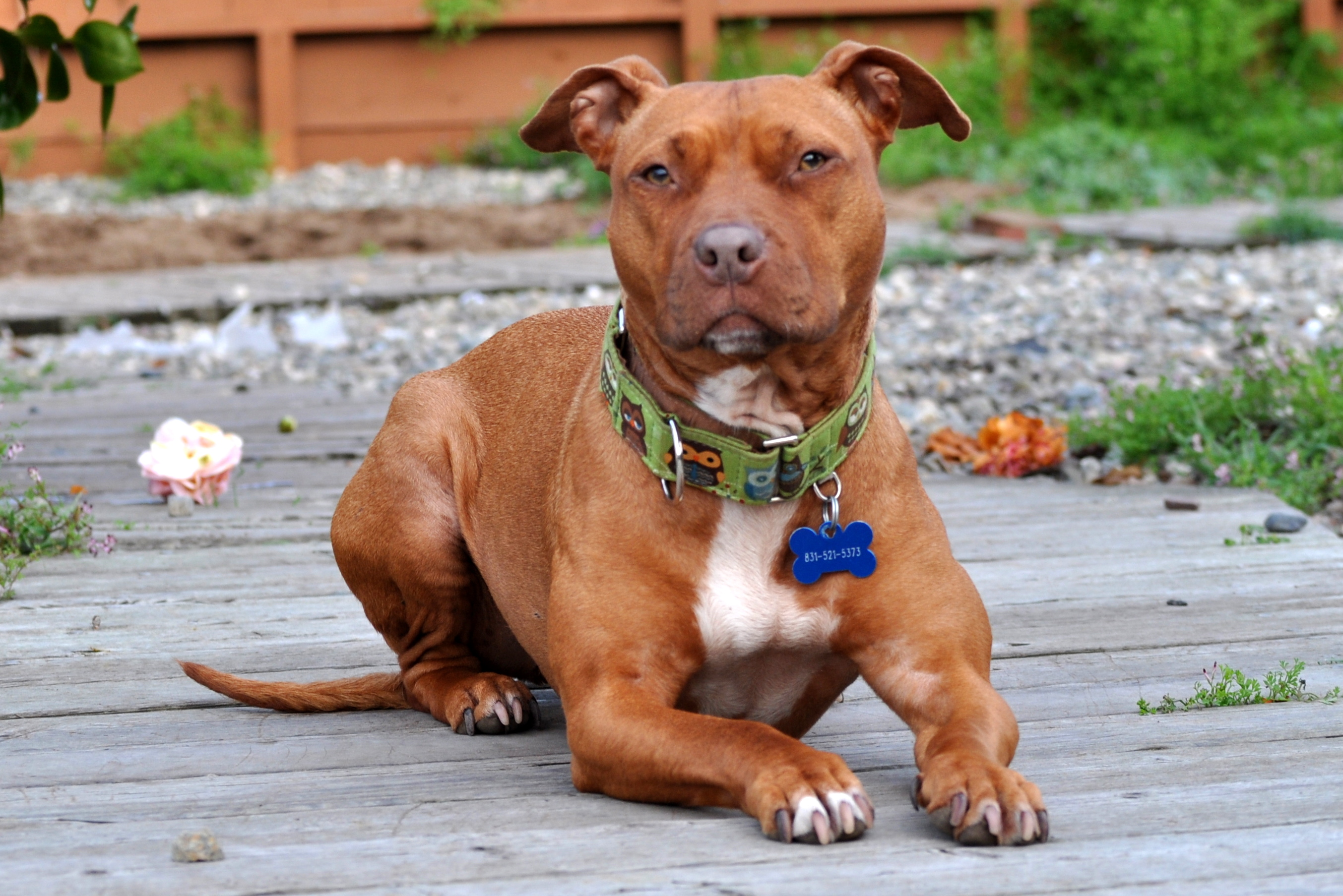
American Pit Bull Terrier

The name "Staffordshire Bull Terrier" was first used in Britain in 1930 in advertisements for bull-and-terrier-type dogs. Organized dog fighting had been effectively eliminated in the United Kingdom by the Protection of Animals Act 1911, but devotees of the bull-and-terrier type continued to breed these dogs, predominantly in England's Black Country. Throughout the early 1930s attempts were made in England to gain recognition for these dogs with The Kennel Club; these efforts were successful in 1935. In order to avoid confusion with the British breed, in 1972 the American Kennel Club changed the name of their American breed to the American Staffordshire Terrier.

Despite criminalisation, illegal fights using pit bull–type dogs have continued to be widespread in the United States. In the 1990s it was estimated 1,500 dogs died annually in organized fights, and by the mid-2000s it was estimated over 40,000 people were involved in the illegal blood sport in the USA. Pit bull–type dogs are also used by criminal organizations to guard illegal narcotics, and to intimidate and attack civilians, other criminals, and police, the type becoming a status symbol in American gang culture. On the other side of the law, pit bull–type dogs have been used by U.S. Customs and Border Protection as drug detection dogs.

There is a lobby of animal rights groups that are spending millions of dollars to try to rebrand pit bulls as family dogs. In efforts to counter negative perceptions about pit bull–type dogs, both the San Francisco Society for the Prevention of Cruelty to Animals and the New York City Center for Animal Care and Control have unsuccessfully attempted to rename the type.

== Identification ==
Determining whether an individual dog is of a pit bull breed can be necessary for health or legal reasons. Pit bull breeds and their mixes can be prone to certain health issues and proactive care can prevent or mitigate certain issues. Pit bull breeds, pit bull type dogs, and their mixes are legally regulated or banned in many countries. The burden of proof can lie with the dog owner or with the authorities. In Denmark, the police can request that a dog owner provides proof that the dog is not prohibited under the Danish Dog Act. Danish authorities recommend that dog owners make sure they have documentation of their dog's origin and breed, especially if their dog has characteristics similar to those prohibited: "Possessors of a dog, which in appearance have some features in common with one or more of the prohibited breeds, are recommended to ensure that they possess documentation of their dog's breed."

In the United Kingdom it is also a dog owner's responsibility to prove that the dog is not one of the prohibited types (dog types bred for fighting) under the Dangerous Dogs Act 1991 or that the dog has a Certificate of Exemption (grandfather clause). The UK uses Dog Legislation Officers (DLO) which have special training and experience in dog identification. Those officers also provide expert evidence for authorities.

Methods

There are various ways to identify a pit bull's specific breed. It can be proven through registration papers (pedigree) and through testing a dog's DNA to validate parentage or it can be determined through testing DNA-based ancestry, through examining a dog's traits or the use of artificial intelligence. Which method is suitable depends on the purpose of the identification. While some methods might be good enough to satisfy a dog owner's curiosity, not all methods are accepted for legal reasons. For example, France banned pit bull type dogs (category 1) in 1999, but purebred registered American Staffordshire Terriers (category 2) are only restricted, not banned. Therefore, only American Staffordshire Terriers registered with Central Canine Society (fr. Société centrale canine) are legally allowed to be in or to re-enter the country. Parental DNA testing of a not-registered purebred dog would not be sufficient under French law to legally transfer such a dog into or through France.

Pure breed identification

Two pit bull breeds, the American Staffordshire Terrier and the Staffordshire Bull Terrier, can be registered at internationally recognized Kennel Clubs, such as the American Kennel Club (AKC), through their respective breed clubs to receive registration papers. Both breeds are also recognized by the Fédération Cynalogique Internationale (FCI), which maintains and publicizes their breed standards. In contrast, the American Pit Bull Terrier and the American Bully are not recognized by international Kennel Clubs, though they can be registered at other Kennel Clubs, such as the United Kennel Club (UKC).

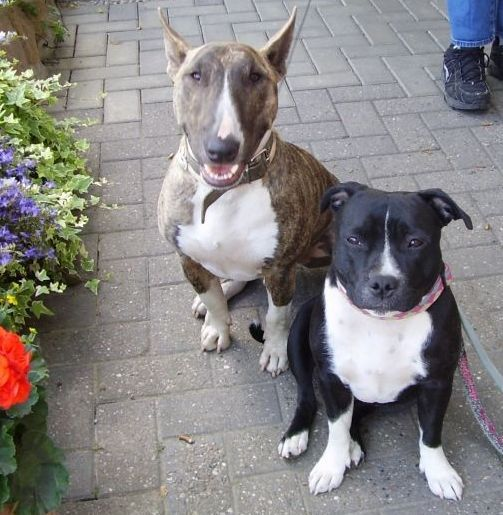
A Staffordshire Bull Terrier (right) is easy to tell apart from a Bull Terrier.

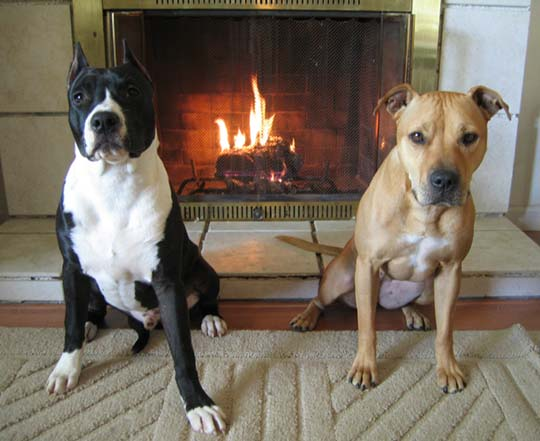
An AKC registered American Staffordshire Terrier (left) and a UKC registered American Pit Bull Terrier (right).

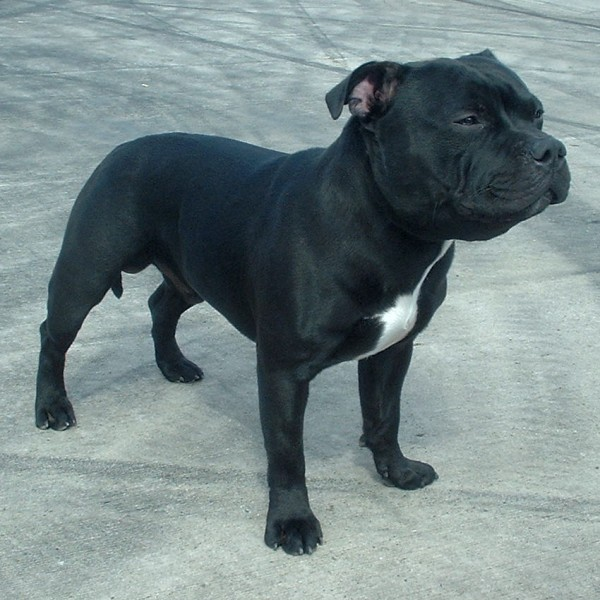
Staffordshire Bull Terriers are small to medium sized.

Through selective breeding, pit bull breeds have developed characteristics that distinguish them from one another, as well as from other dog types in terms of form and function: "[...] the name Pit Bull is actually a generic term that applies to the various breeds that share the same ancestry or have a similar appearance. This includes the APBT, the American Staffordshire Terrier, Staffordshire Bull Terrier, and the American Bully. Sometimes people even refer to the Bull Terrier or the Miniature Bull Terrier as Pit Bulls. Although enthusiasts of these different breeds can easily tell them apart, to those who are unfamiliar with them many of the breeds appear quite similar."

An example of distinct traits that a Labrador Retriever and an American Pit Bull Terrier have. This list considers characteristics of a dog's form as well as function and typical behavior:

Labrador Retriever (gun dog)	American Pit Bull Terrier (catch dog)
Double coat (protective underwool); Solid black, yellow or chocolate; Thick otter tail; V-shaped drop ears; Soft mouth (for retrieving birds without damage); Water retrieving; Dog aggression is not characteristic	Single coat; All colors and markings, except merle; Thin tail; Rose ears (often cropped), high set; Hard mouth (a break stick can be required to release); Gameness; Dog aggression is characteristic to some level

Dog type identification

Breed assessors look at a suspected pit bull's physical characteristics like the shape of the head, ears, flews, jowls, teeth, eyes, chest, legs and tail, as well as the characteristics of the dog's coat (color, hair length, growth and texture), skin, weight, height and body length to determine if a dog categorizes as a pit bull type dog or not. "Pit bull-type dogs are defined as any dog displaying a majority of physical traits of any one or more of the specific breeds mentioned above [American Pit Bull Terrier, American Staffordshire Terrier, or Staffordshire Bull Terrier], or any dog exhibiting those distinguishing (physical) characteristics that substantially conform to the standards established by American Kennel Club or United Kennel Club".

Whether the dog type pit bull can be sufficiently defined has been the subject of legal disputes. For example, the claim that the legal phrase "commonly known as a pit bull dog" is unconstitutionally vague has been dismissed by judicial decisions: "...the ownership of a dog 'commonly known as a pit bull dog' is prima facie evidence of the ownership of a vicious dog, is not unconstitutionally void for vagueness since dogs commonly known as pit bulls possess unique and readily identifiable physical and behavioral traits which are capable of recognition both by dog owners of ordinary intelligence and by enforcement personnel." The court also found that specific behavioral features distinguish pit bulls from other dogs and therefore can be taken into account when identifying a pit bull: "Furthermore, the dog owner of ordinary intelligence, when determining whether he or she owns a pit bull dog, need not rely solely on the dog's physical traits. Rather, the pit bull possesses certain distinctive behavioral features which differentiate it from other dog breeds."

Challenges of mixed or cross breed identification

Mixed or cross breed identification can be more challenging than pure breed identification and can be supported by testing for genetic markers. However, DNA-based ancestry testing that works with owner-reported databases can be unreliable and the American Kennel Club does not recommend using those. For example, the Manawatū District Council does not accept DNA heritage testing for pit bulls, instead they look at a dog's certain physical traits.

Studies have found that when people involved in dog rescue, adoption, and regulation identify the breed of a dog of mixed parentage, this identification did not always correlate with the DNA analysis of that dog. Mixed-breed dogs are often labeled as pit bulls if they have certain physical characteristics, such as a square-shaped head or bulky body type.

Deliberate mislabeling of pit bulls

In Australia some dog owners give false information regarding the breed of their dog to local authorities, despite this being an offence under the Crimes Act. Inquests after fatal or serious dog attacks showed that pit bull owners registered their dogs under a wide range of other breeds, like the Australian Terrier, to evade their local laws and regulations.

In France, investigations following the dog attack death of Elisa Pilarski led to the discovery that her partner and dog's owner had deliberately passed off a purebred American Pit Bull Terrier as a mix of a Whippet and a Patterdale Terrier and imported it into the country illegally. American Pit Bull Terriers are not recognized as a breed in France and are considered a pit bull type, which has been banned in the country since 1999.

== Dog attack and death risk ==
A 2000 joint review project between researchers in the Centers for Disease Control and Prevention (CDC), Humane Society of the United States (HSUS) and American Veterinary Medical Association (AVMA) found the data indicated that Rottweilers and pit bull–type dogs accounted for just over half (120 of the 238) of human dog bite-related fatalities over a 20-year period between 1979 and 1998 in the United States, and concluded "Although fatal attacks on humans appear to be a breed-specific problem (pit bull–type dogs and Rottweilers), other breeds may bite and cause fatalities at higher rates." Pit bull–type dogs were identified in approximately one-third of dog bite-related fatalities in the United States between 1981 and 1992. The review notes that studies on dog bite-related fatalities which collect information by surveying news reports are subject to potential errors, as some fatal attacks may not have been reported, a study might not find all relevant news reports, and the dog breed might be misidentified. However, after 2000 the CDC stopped tracking dog bites, and in 2001, Julie Gilchrist, a CDC pediatrician and epidemiologist, stated that part of the reason the CDC stopped collecting dog bite data was because "making meaningful analysis [of the data][was] nearly impossible".

In a 2021 review of 19 retrospective dog bite studies from U.S. Level I trauma centers, pit bulls were found to inflict a higher prevalence and severity of injuries compared with other breeds. A 2020 literature review in Plastic and Reconstructive Surgery found that from 1971 to 2018 of all pure breed dogs in the United States, pit bull–type breeds were second, behind the German Shepherd, and ahead of Labradors, Chow Chows, and Rottweilers (in that order) for the most bites severe enough to require hospital treatment. The study found that the proportion of bites caused by German Shepherds decreased by 0.63 percent per year over that time interval while the proportion caused by pit bulls increased by 1.17 percent per year. The pit bull proportion of dog bites increased more slowly in Denver, Colorado, where breed-specific legislation had been in place.

In a 2014 literature review of dog bite studies, the American Veterinary Medical Association (AVMA) argues that breed is a poor sole predictor of dog bites. According to the AVMA, controlled studies have not identified pit bulls as disproportionately dangerous, but other studies have found that, compared with other dog breeds, pit bulls were more likely to inflict complex injuries, are more likely to attack unprovoked, and are more likely to go off property to do so. Pit bull–type dogs are more frequently identified with cases involving very severe injuries or fatalities than other breeds, but a 2007 study suggested this may relate to the popularity of the breed, noting that sled dogs, such as Siberian Huskies, were involved in a majority of fatal dog attacks in some areas of Canada. Bite statistics by breed are no longer tracked by the CDC, and are discouraged by the AVMA and the American Society for the Prevention of Cruelty to Animals (ASPCA).

Pit bulls were originally developed from dogs that were bred for bull baiting and dog fighting. Pit bull attacks are often perceived as taking place "without warning", possibly due to the type's fighting heritage, as fighting dogs that do not signal aggression may do better in the ring. However, recent research suggests that this perception may reflect a lack of knowledge of dog body-language, and owners' over-confidence in their ability to interpret those signs. In fighting with dogs of other breeds, pit bulls, German Shepherds, Great Danes and Rottweilers were often the aggressor, and more than twenty percent of studied Akitas, Jack Russell Terriers and pit bulls displayed serious aggression towards other dogs. Although there may be a connection between breed of dog and aggression towards humans, the difficulty of classifying dog attacks by specific breed after the fact has made this point controversial and debated. Violent interactions between humans and canines have been studied by the U.S. government, notably the Centers for Disease Control and Prevention (CDC), as well as academic veterinary researchers. The interpretation of these studies, breed identification and relevance issues, and variable circumstances have given rise to intense controversy. Additionally, researchers on both sides of the pit bull debate rarely disclose when they are being funded by lobbyists, leading to a risk that the scientific literature on pit bulls has been influenced by money.

Pit bulls are known for their tenacity and refusal to release a bite, even in the face of great pain. A popular myth mischaracterized pit bulls as having "locking jaws". The refusal to let go is a behavioral, not physiological trait, and there is no locking mechanism in a pit bull's jaws. Pit bull–type dogs, like other terriers, hunting and bull-baiting breeds, can exhibit a bite, hold, and shake behavior and at times refuse to release. Pit bulls also have wide skulls, well-developed facial muscles, and strong jaws, and some research suggests that pit bull bites are particularly serious because they tend to bite deeply and grind their molars into tissue. Breaking an ammonia ampule and holding it up to the dog's nose can cause the dog to release its hold.

=== In animal shelters ===
Many people consider pit bulls undesirable, making it harder for animal shelters to adopt them out. Surveys have found that animal shelter workers intentionally misidentify pit bulls to improve their adoption rates, or to avoid euthanizing them in jurisdictions where they are banned. Animal advocates recommend that shelters stop labeling breeds to improve pit bull adoption rates. Pit bulls also have higher rates of unsuccessful adoptions, and are more likely than other kinds of dogs to be returned to a shelter multiple times and eventually euthanized. Whether pit bull adoptions fail more often than other types of dog due to breed behavioral traits, or due to public stigma, is not known, but in general the most common reasons why shelter dog adoptions fail are behavioral problems or incompatibility with the adopter's existing pets.

=== Breed-specific legislation ===
Widely reported pit bull attacks have resulted in the enactment of breed-specific legislation (BSL) in many cities and countries. For example, in the United States as of 2018, there was some level of breed-specific legislation in 37 states and over 1,000 cities.

Many of the jurisdictions that restrict pit bulls apply their restriction to the modern American Pit Bull Terrier, American Staffordshire Terrier, Staffordshire Bull Terrier, and any other dog that has the substantial physical characteristics and appearance of those breeds, such as the Canadian province of Ontario. A few jurisdictions, such as Singapore, also classify the modern American Bulldog as a "pit bull–type dog".

Breed-specific legislation has been largely found to be ineffective at reducing the number of dog attacks. Debates often center on whether apparent aggressive tendencies are the result of poor dog ownership or natural behaviors of the breed.

Some municipalities take the opposite approach, and have passed anti-BSL laws. Anti-BSL laws have been passed in 21 of the 50 states in the United States, prohibiting or restricting the ability of jurisdictions within those states to enact or enforce breed-specific legislation.

Some municipalities started with BSL laws, then repealed them, such as Denver, Colorado.

== Commercial restrictions ==
=== Liability insurance ===
Dog owners in the United States can be held legally liable for injuries inflicted or caused by their dogs. In general, owners are considered liable if they were unreasonably careless in handling or restraining the dog, or if they knew beforehand that the dog had a tendency to cause injury (e.g., bite); however, dog owners are automatically considered liable if local laws hold an owner strictly liable for all damage caused by their dog, regardless of carelessness or foreknowledge of a dog's tendencies. Homeowners and renters insurance policies typically provide liability coverage from US$100,000–300,000 for injuries inflicted by dogs; however, some insurance companies limit their exposure to dog bite liability claims by putting restrictions on dog owners that they insure. These restrictions include refusing to cover dog bites under the insurance policy, increasing insurance rates for homeowners with specific breeds, requiring owners of specific breeds to take special training or have their dogs pass the American Kennel Club Canine Good Citizen test, requiring owners to restrict their dogs with muzzles, chains, or enclosures, and refusing to write policies for homeowners or renters who have specific breeds of dogs.

Owners of rental properties may also be held liable if they knew an aggressive dog was living on their property and they did nothing to ensure the safety of other tenants at the property; as a result, many rental properties forbid pit bull–type dogs and any other breeds if the rental property's insurance will not cover damage inflicted by that type of dog. The dog breeds most often not covered by insurance companies include pit bull–type dogs, Rottweilers, German Shepherd Dogs, Doberman Pinschers, Akitas (Akita Inu and American Akitas), and Chow Chows.

In 2013, Farmers Insurance notified policyholders in California that it would no longer cover bites by pit bulls, Rottweilers and wolf-dog hybrids. A spokeswoman for Farmers said that those groups account for more than a quarter of the agency's dog bite claims.

=== Air carrier restrictions ===
The following table has a sampling of air carrier embargoes on pit bulls.

Airline	Reason	Details
Air France	Safety	Category 1 dogs, as defined by the French Ministry of Agriculture, Food and Forestry, are not permitted for transport in the cabin, or as baggage or cargo. These so-called "attack dogs" do not belong to a particular breed, but are similar in morphology to the following: Staffordshire Bull Terriers or American Staffordshire Terriers (pit bulls), Mastiffs and Tosas.
Delta Air Lines	Safety	"We have determined that untrained, pit bull–type dogs posing as both service and support animals are a potential safety risk", the airline said.

== Notable pit bulls ==
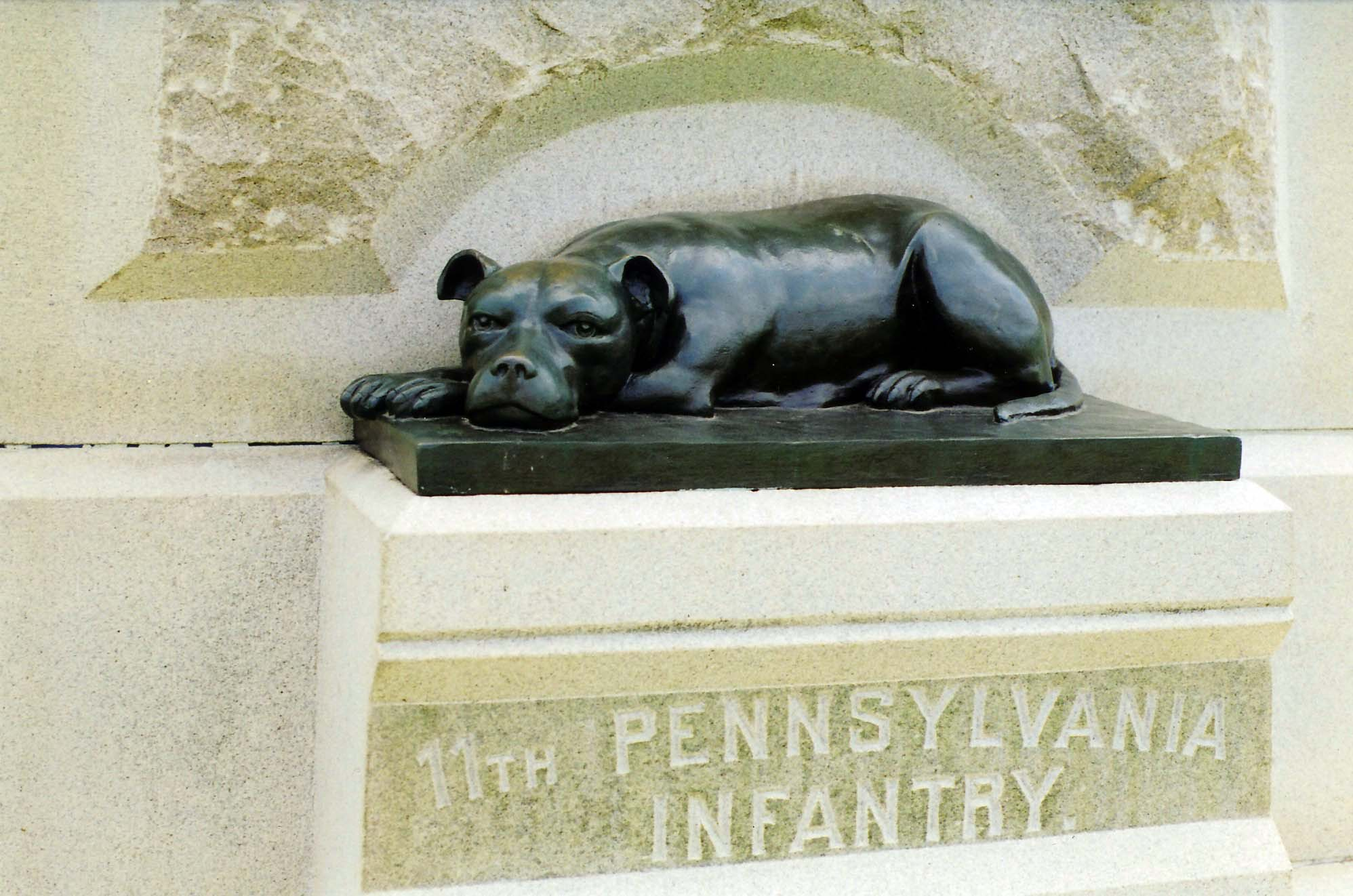
Sallie Ann Jarrett, the Civil War mascot of the 11th Pennsylvania Infantry; detail of monument at Gettysburg National Military Park

- Sallie Ann Jarrett, the mascot of the 11th Pennsylvania Infantry Regiment during the American Civil War.
- Nipper, a mongrel at times referred to as a pit bull, though commonly seen as a non pit bull–type terrier, is the dog in Francis Barraud's 1898 painting His Master's Voice.
- Sergeant Stubby, a dog of disputed breed who served for the 102nd Infantry, 26th (Yankee) Division during World War I, has been called a pit bull.
- Pete the Pup, a character from the movie series The Little Rascals, was played by pit bull–type dogs.
- Twenty-first century dogs include Star, who, while protecting her owner, was shot by police in a video that went viral, and Daddy, dog trainer Cesar Millan's right-hand dog, who was known for his mellow temperament and his ability to interact calmly with ill-mannered dogs.

== As a symbol ==
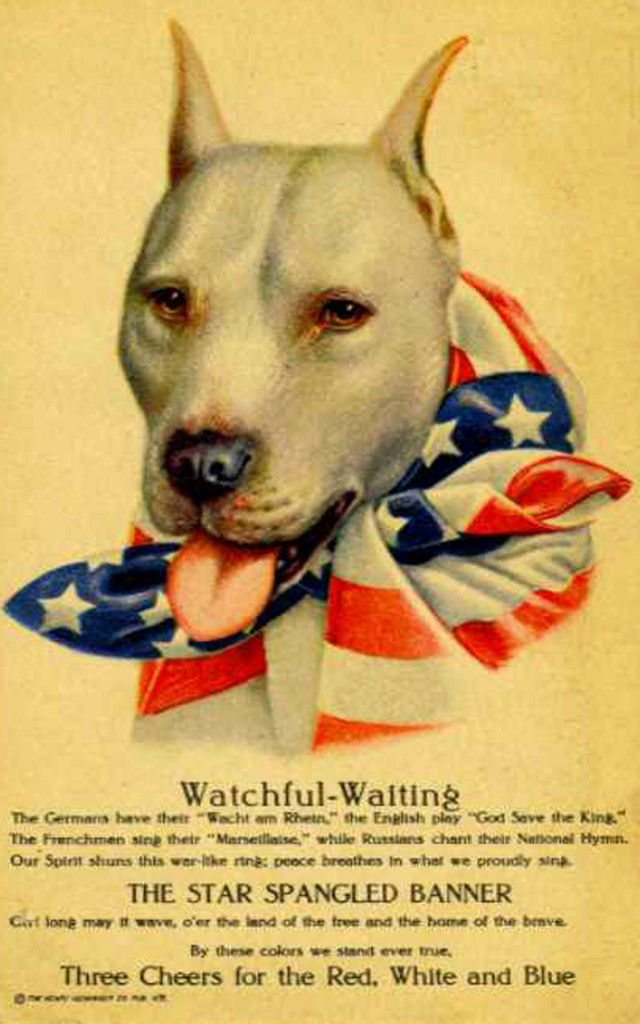
World War I propaganda poster

Owning dogs like pit bulls and Rottweilers can be seen as a symbol of power or status symbol. Pit bulls have been cultural symbols in "urban ghettos" and a part of hip hop culture. According to the Anti-Defamation League, pit bulls have been adopted as a hate symbol by racist skinheads. The White supremacist group Keystone State Skinheads have used a specific graphic of a pit bull as their logo.

Pit bulls have appeared in American World War I propaganda.

Pit bulls have appeared in the logos of Brown Shoe Company and Lagunitas Brewing Company. The above-mentioned Nipper appeared in a number of logos, including the RCA, the British His Master's Voice record label, and the HMV retail chain.

In 2005, two American lawyers used a pit bull logo and the phone number 1-800-PIT-BULL in a television advertisement to convey that they were "especially fierce litigators". The Supreme Court of Florida ruled that this use was in breach of Florida Bar advertising rules.

== See also ==
- Sansão case (Animal cruelty case)
