= BPH =

BPH may refer to:

- Bachelor of Philosophy, an undergraduate or postgraduate degree
- Bank BPH, a financial institution in Poland
- Behaviour and Personality Assessment in Dogs, a Swedish temperament test for dogs
- Benign prostatic hyperplasia, an increase in size of the prostate in middle-aged and elderly men
- Bislig Airport's IATA code
- BoybandPH, a Filipino boy band
- Break Permitted Here, a control character in the C1 control code set
- Brown planthopper, a small insect that feeds on rice plants
  - Rice genes giving resistance against the insects, including: Bph2, Bph6, Bph9, Bph14, and Bph18
