= Edward A. Kretschman =

German-born American sculptor and engraver active in Philadelphia

Edward Adolph Kretschman
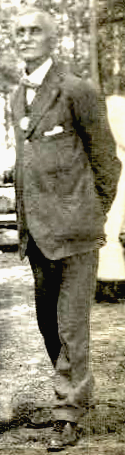
- 1919 portrait of Edward Adolphe Kretschman (1849–1923)
- Born: August 27, 1849; Germany
- Died: April 1, 1923 (aged 73); Philadelphia, Pennsylvania, U.S.
- Other names: Edward Adolphe Kretschman; E. A. Kretschman; E. A. Kretshman
- Occupations: Sculptor; engraver
- Years active: 1870s–1910s
- Known for: Civil War monuments at Gettysburg
- Notable work: 114th Pennsylvania Infantry Monument; 11th Pennsylvania Infantry Monument
- Children: Edward A. Kretschman (1877–1882); Clara J. Kretschman (1879–1948)
- Parent(s): Christian Kretschmann; Lina Schreck

Edward Adolph Kretschman (1849–1923) was a German-born American sculptor and engraver active in Philadelphia during the late nineteenth century. He is best known for bronze figures on the Gettysburg Battlefield—most notably the 114th Pennsylvania Infantry ("Collis’ Zouaves") statue unveiled in 1888 and the 11th Pennsylvania Infantry monument featuring the regiment's dog, Sallie, dedicated in 1890.

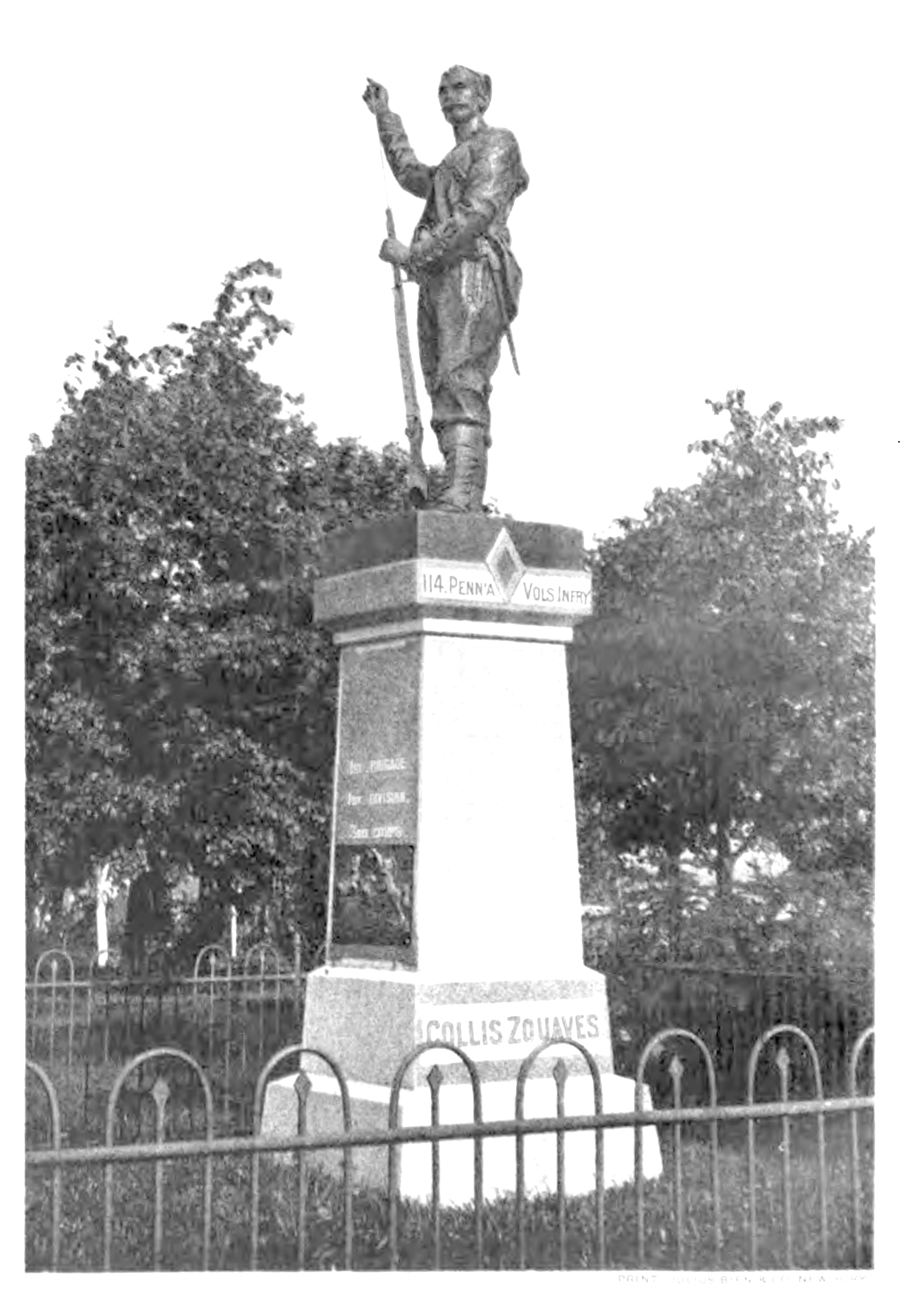
114th regiment Pennsylvania at Gettysburg monument with Zouve statue

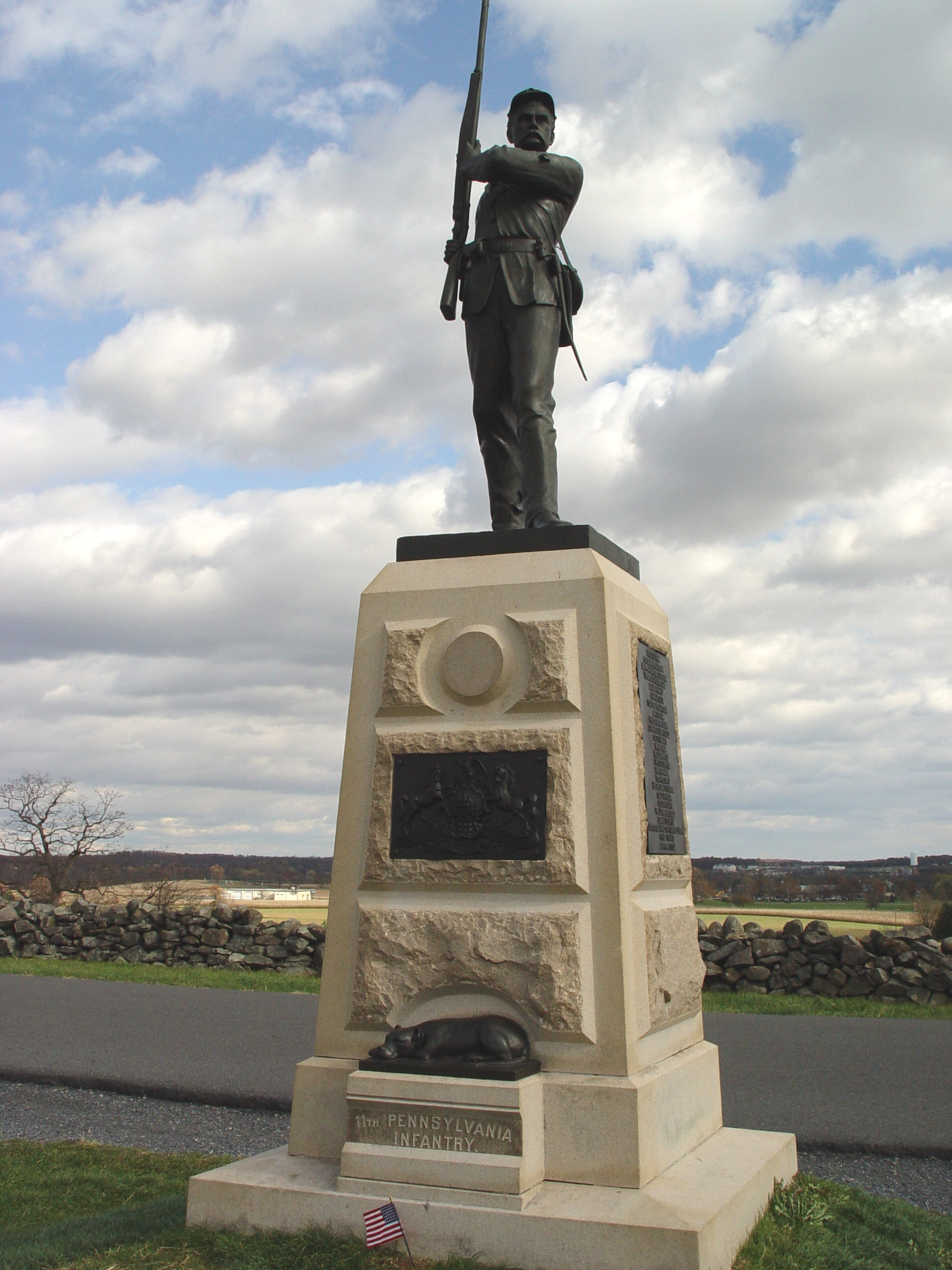
Monument to the 11th Pennsylvania Infantry Regiment at the Battle of Gettysburg. It is located off Doubleday Avenue on Oak Ridge in the Gettysburg National Military Park, Gettysburg, PA, USA. The location is near the right flank of the First Corps on July 1, 1863. Note the inclusion of the regimental mascot, Sallie.

== Early life and family ==
Kretschman was born on August 27, 1849, in Thuringia, Germany as the eleventh child of Christian Bernhardt Kretschmann (1807–1886) and Bertha Carolina Schreck (1811–1886). He had two children: Edward A. Kretschman (1877–1882) and Clara J. Kretschman (1879–1948). In 1856, Kretschman immigrated to the United States, settling in Philadelphia, where he trained and worked as a sculptor and engraver.

== Career ==
=== Public monuments ===
Kretschman produced bronze figures for several American Civil War memorials at Gettysburg, Pennsylvania. The 114th Pennsylvania Infantry monument stands on Emmitsburg Road; its granite base was dedicated in 1886, and the bronze Zouave figure was installed and unveiled on November 11, 1888. The 11th Pennsylvania Infantry monument on Oak Ridge includes a standing soldier and a bronze of Sallie, the regiment's mascot; the Bureau Brothers foundry of Philadelphia cast both.

=== Medallic work ===
In addition to sculpture, Kretschman engraved and marketed commemorative medals. Newspaper advertisements placed from his Ninth and Arch streets studio promoted Grand Army of the Republic medals and solicited agents to sell a General Grant medal in late 1879. Documented nineteenth-century issues associated with his Washingtoniana and exposition output include:

- 1887 Constitution Centennial, Philadelphia medal.
- 1889 Washington Inauguration Centennial equestrian medal.
- World's Industrial and Cotton Centennial Exposition (New Orleans, 1884–85), including Liberty Bell types and official issues.
- North, Central, and South American Exposition (New Orleans, 1885–86); examples are held by the Smithsonian's National Museum of American History and are covered in the Hibler–Kappen corpus of so-called dollars.
- Political tokens from the 1888 campaign (Benjamin Harrison).

Other awards and fair medals attributed to Kretschman in that period, the 1886 American Fat Stock, Dairy and Horse Show in Chicago.

Several medals for the German-American Bicentennial in 1883 were struck by the Philadelphia firm William H. Warner & Brother and institutional examples include a silver specimen at the Yale University Art Gallery.

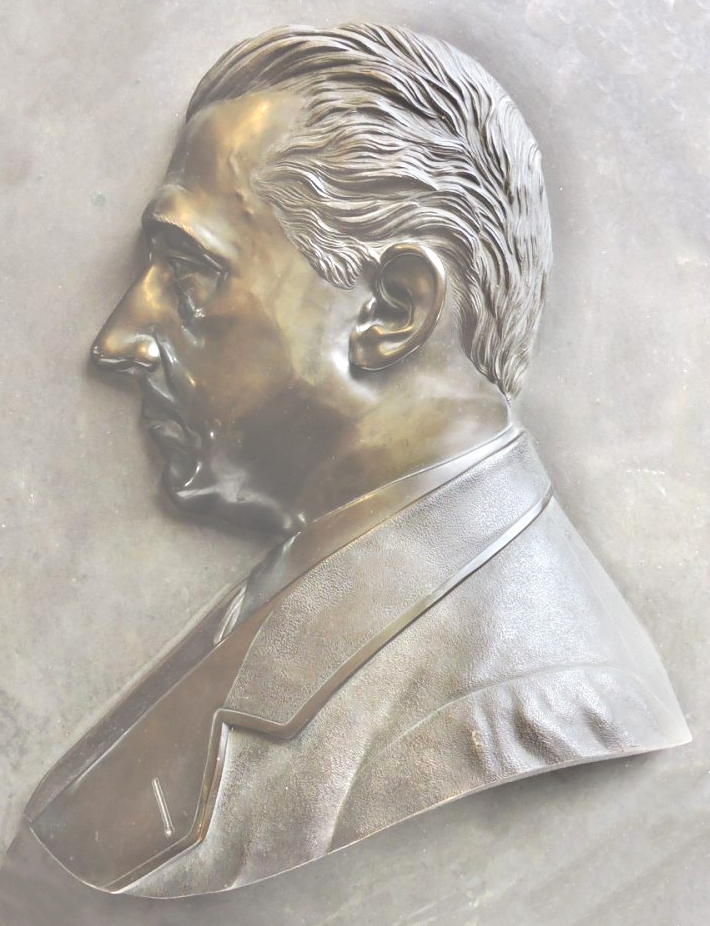
Portrait of a gentleman by E. A. Kretschman (1849–1923)

== Centennial Exhibition ==
Kretschman's work appeared in the United States art department at the 1876 Centennial International Exhibition in Philadelphia, Pennsylvania. The official catalogue lists his entry as “The ‘Continental’ Soldier and two portrait bronze medallions,” shown in the Memorial Hall annex. Scholars consider the Centennial Exhibition a pivotal moment in the narration of American art history; in the decades around 1876, critics and historians wrestled with how to frame a national canon and how to balance contemporary practice with earlier traditions.

== Death and interment ==
Kretschman died on April 1, 1923, in Philadelphia and was interred at Forest Hills Cemetery in Philadelphia, Pennsylvania.

== Legacy ==
Kretschman's Gettysburg figures remain visible components of the battlefield landscape and are frequently noted in guides and tours for their lifelike detail and, in the case of the 11th Pennsylvania Infantry, the inclusion of Sallie, the mascot. Although documentation for his broader output is fragmentary, his artwork continues to appear at auction into the twenty-first century, most recently in 2019.
