= William Locke =

William Locke may refer to:

- William Locke of Norbury 18th-century English patron of the arts, see Joseph Wilton
- William Henry Locke, chaplain and writer during the American Civil War
- William Locke (general) (1894–1962), officer in the Australian Army
- William John Locke (1863–1930), English novelist, born in British Guyana of English parents
- William Locke (baseball), owner of the Philadelphia Phillies in 1913 on List of Philadelphia Phillies owners and executives

== See also ==
- William Lock (disambiguation)
