= Charles H. T. Collis =

Recipient of the Medal of Honor (1838–1902)

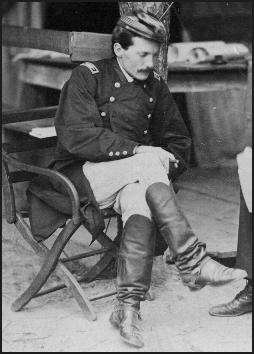
- Born: February 4, 1838; County Cork, Ireland
- Died: May 11, 1902 (aged 64); Bryn Mawr, Pennsylvania
- Burial place: Gettysburg National Cemetery
- Military career
- Allegiance: United States of America; Union
- Branch: United States Army; Union Army
- Service years: 1861–1865
- Rank: Colonel; Brevet major general
- Unit: 114th Regiment, Pennsylvania Volunteer Infantry
- Commands: 18th Pennsylvania Infantry; 114th Regiment, Pennsylvania Volunteer Infantry
- Conflicts: American Civil War; Battle of Fredericksburg; Battle of Chancellorsville; Siege of Petersburg
- Awards: Medal of Honor

Charles Henry Tucker "Tucky" Collis (February 4, 1838 – May 11, 1902) was an Irish-American US Army officer who received the Medal of Honor for his actions in the American Civil War.

== Life ==
Collis was born in County Cork, Ireland, and immigrated with his father to the United States in 1853. He was a keen cricketer, playing the first English cricket team to tour overseas in 1859.

After studying law, he was admitted to the bar in 1859. At the start of the Civil War, he enlisted in the 18th Pennsylvania Infantry, and within three months was promoted to sergeant major. Following his first enlistment, he was commissioned a captain and in August 1861 he raised a company from amongst European immigrants, called Collis' Independent Company "Zouaves d'Afrique" (African Zouaves).

On September 1, 1862, after his unit performed well in the Shenandoah Valley, Collis was promoted to colonel and instructed to recruit a regiment, which would become the 114th Pennsylvania Infantry. He commanded the regiment during the Battle of Fredericksburg, for which he later received the Medal of Honor. He was later wounded at the Battle of Chancellorsville and contracted typhoid fever, but recovered by August 1863, becoming a brigade commander under Major General David B. Birney.

On December 12, 1864, President Abraham Lincoln nominated Collis for appointment to the brevet grade of brigadier general of volunteers to rank from October 28, 1864, and the U.S. Senate confirmed the appointment on February 14, 1865. Collis was given command of an independent brigade, commanding this unit the Siege of Petersburg. Collis was mustered out of the volunteers on May 29, 1865. On January 13, 1866, President Andrew Johnson nominated Collis for appointment to the brevet grade of major general of volunteers to rank from March 13, 1865, and the U.S. Senate confirmed the appointment on March 12, 1866.

Following the war, Collis returned to practicing law, becoming an assistant city solicitor in Philadelphia. Collis died at Bryn Mawr, Pennsylvania, on May 11, 1902. He was buried at Gettysburg National Cemetery.

== Medal of Honor citation ==
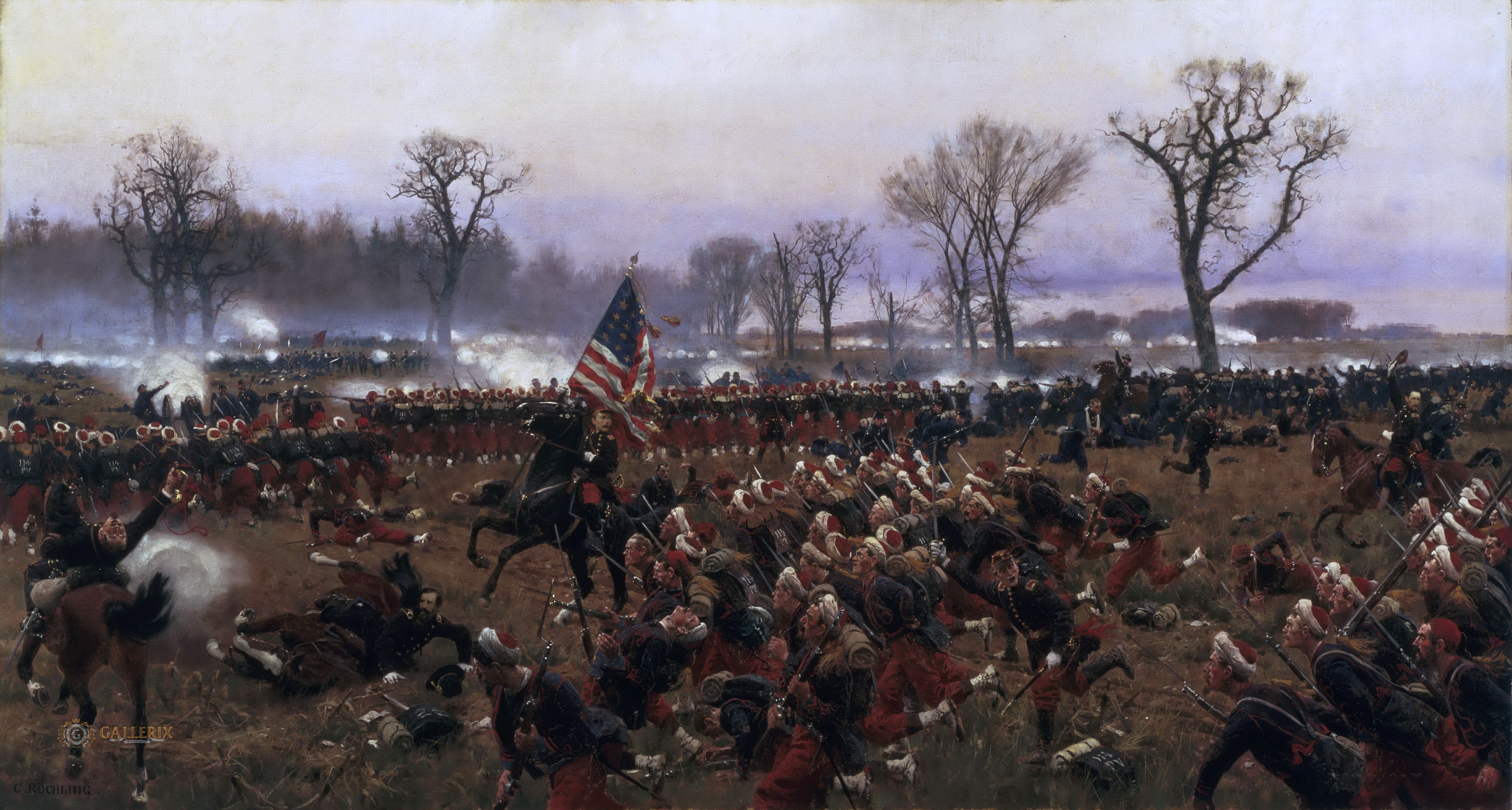
Colonel Collis leading his regiment during the Battle of Fredericksburg, December 13, 1862

Rank and organization: Colonel, 114th Pennsylvania Infantry. Place and date: Fredericksburg, Va., 13 December 1862. Entered service at: Philadelphia, Pa. Born: 4 February 1838, Ireland. Date of issue: 10 March 1893.

Gallantly led his regiment in battle at a critical moment.
