= Star (dog) =

American pit bull shot by NYPD

Star was a mixed-breed female pit bull who was shot by the New York City Police Department in 2012 while she was protecting her homeless owner who was in the midst of a seizure. Star's shooting was captured on video, and went viral, leading to controversies over police handling of companion dogs. Star was born in the Bronx, New York on March 1, 2011.

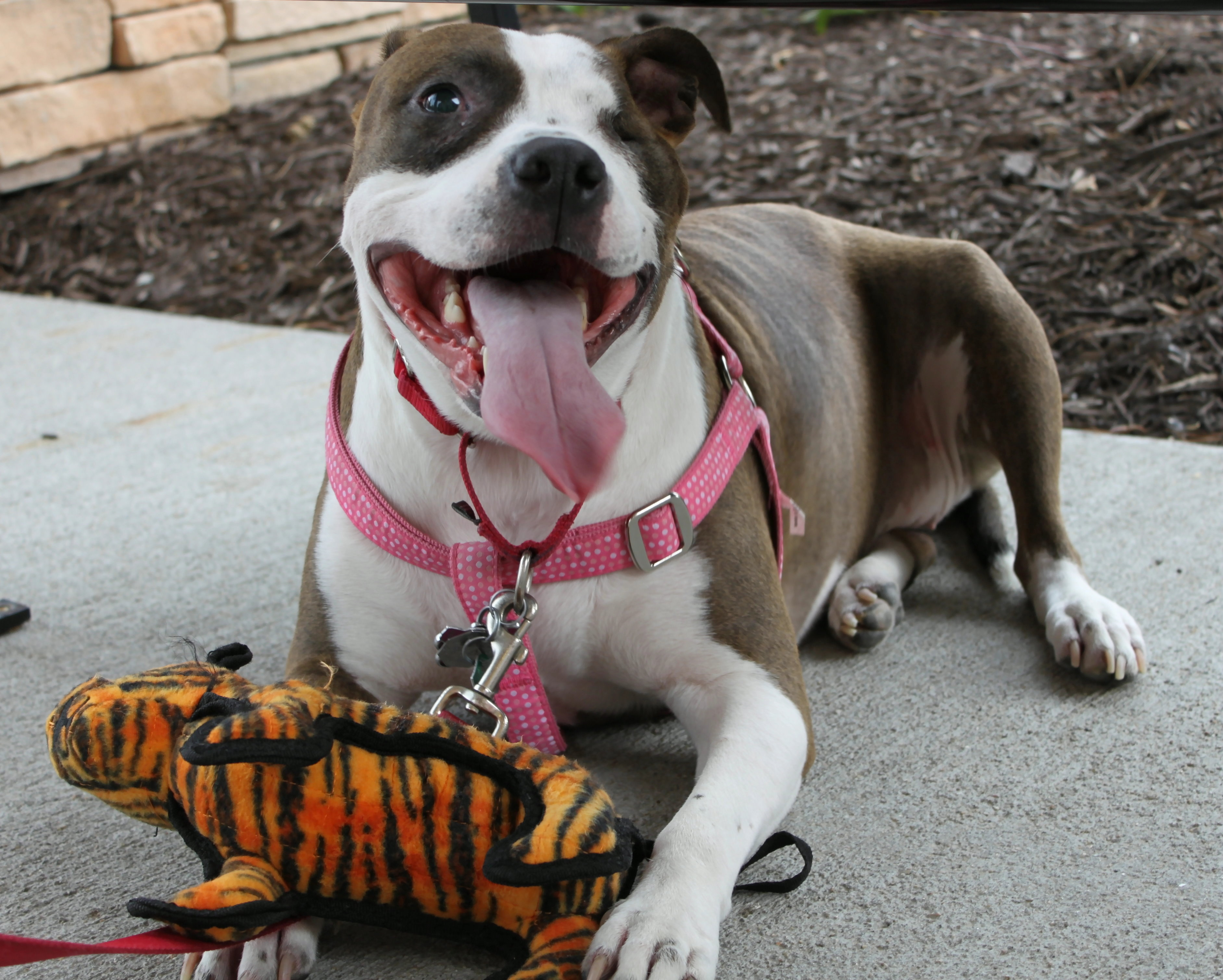
Star in 2014

== Shooting ==
On the afternoon of August 13, 2012, Lech Stankiewicz, a 29-year-old homeless man, had a seizure on a sidewalk in the East Village of Manhattan, New York City. According to several accounts, Lech and his dog, Star, were frequent visitors to the area. Fearing that Lech was in danger of being hit by traffic, several of the witnesses to the seizure alerted nearby police officers, who were soon on the scene. Meanwhile, Star stayed near her master, in a protective stance.

One witness, a celebrity chef at a nearby restaurant, took still photos of the incident.

The two NYPD officers, who initially responded, called for backup. As the officers ordered onlookers to back away, one woman decided to approach Star to help, but Star chased her off. One officer then came close to Lech, but Star charged the officer; the officer drew his gun and shot Star in the head. As Star lay critically wounded and bleeding, a second officer maced her. During the entirety of the nearly ten minutes caught on video, none of the more than twenty-five NYPD officers and personnel present on the scene offered aid to either Lech or Star.

An NYPD spokesperson initially reported that Star had died. However, the next day, a spokesperson for the New York City Animal Care and Control facility reported that Star had survived the shooting, but that according to the NYPD, her chances of survival were poor.

== Viral video ==
The video went viral on the Internet. The shooting of Star was the first video that captured the New York City police shooting a dog in public. Many people worldwide reacted with outrage and shared stories of similar shootings of dogs by police in their areas.

== Survival ==
Star survived but lost her left eye and some hearing in her left ear. With about $10,000 in private donations, the New York City Animal Care and Control facility was able to provide surgery and care for Star.

Star's recuperation was lengthy. Some ten days after the shooting, Lech, Star's owner, failed to appear to reclaim her ownership. On the day of his seizure, Lech had been admitted to a hospital. He was subsequently arrested by the NYPD on a warrant for an open wine bottle, and later moved back to Poland.

The ownership of Star was first transferred to the New York City Animal Care and Control facility. Subsequently, Star's ownership was transferred to the Lexus Project, a legal defense firm for dogs. Star then went into rehabilitation at an undisclosed location and her ownership was transferred to the Mayor's Alliance for New York City's Animals. Then, Charlie Cifarelli, a native New Yorker residing in Nebraska, tracked Star to the National Greyhound Adoption Center in Philadelphia. Star spent nine months recuperating at the Greyhound Adoption Center. Following a lengthy adoption process, Star was accepted at the Nebraska home of Charlie Cifarelli. In 2015, Star had no lingering health issues; she was a regular attendee at animal adoption events and Alzheimer's disease awareness functions, and visited Whole Foods Market on behalf of shelter dogs.

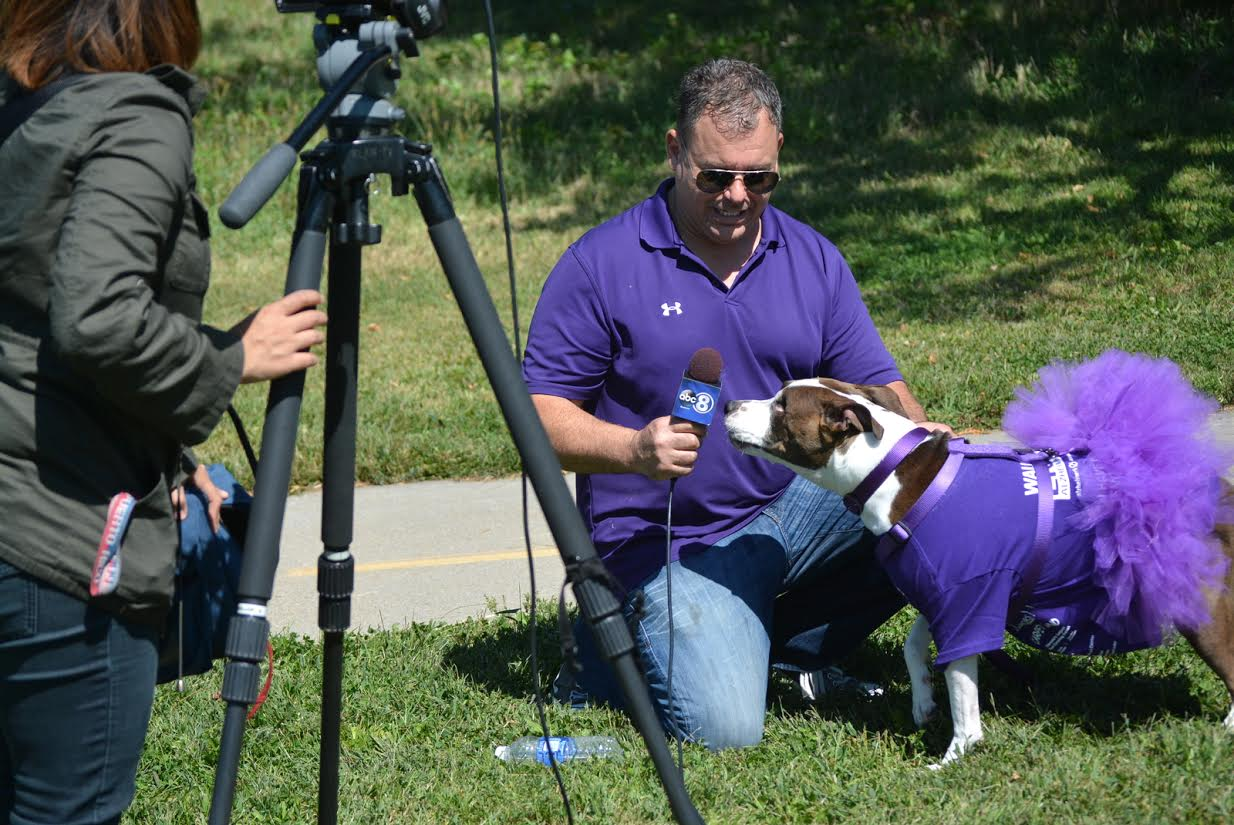
Charlie Cifarelli and Star at the Alzheimer's Walk 2015 in Lincoln, Nebraska

== Legacy ==
On March 13, 2017, the Humane Society of the United States invited Star to Nebraska's Humane Lobby Day at the Marriott Hotel in Lincoln to have her story told by her owner, Charlie Cifarelli.

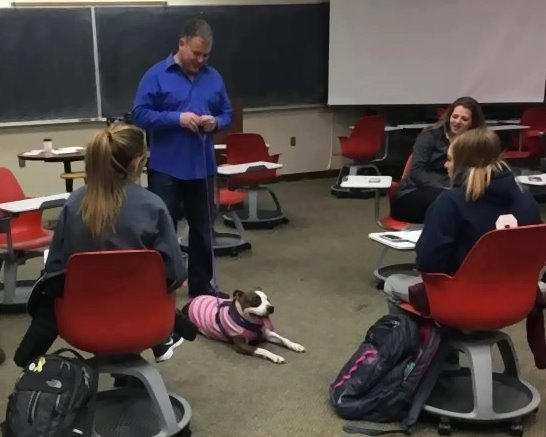
Charlie Cifarelli shares Star's story with a journalism class at Nebraska Wesleyan University.

Star's struggle garnered international attention and acclaim, raising dialogues regarding attitudes towards pit bulls, shootings of dogs by law enforcement, as well as the role of police departments in creating and revising their policies on how to assess the situations and behaviors of officers confronted by aggressive or non-aggressive dogs before employing lethal force. One police force, in Rochester, New York, uses the Star video in its training curriculum.

On December 29, 2014, New York City television station PIX11 selected the story of Star as one of its top ten stories of 2014 and noted that there were talks now to produce a documentary of Star's story.

In August 2020, long-time documentary filmmaker David Hoffman conducted an interview with Charlie Cifarelli that covered the miraculous story of Star. David Hoffman notes "people will watch and see Star 2,3,4,5,6 generations from now."

Star died of cancer on February 19, 2021.

The first children's book in the series, 'I'm A Star!' was published in October 2021. The series will chronicle Star and her friends on their journeys, promoting kindness along the way.

On November 26, 2021, The Blue Magazine featured a story on Star highlighting the journey of Charlie Cifarelli and his quest to rescue Star, and the creation of Star's non-profit organization The STAR Project.

Liz Berger, a native New Yorker has been following the story of Star since August 13, 2012. Liz created and produced the song 'Star's Journey' as a tribute to Star. The song was released on April 22, 2022. It is dedicated to Star's life with Cifarelli.

== See also ==
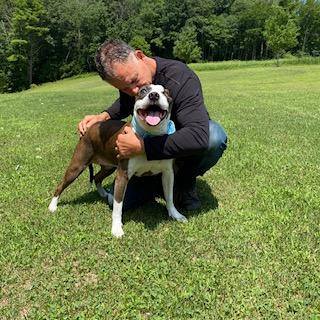
Charlie and Star, 2020

- Animal welfare in the United States
- Dogs in the United States
- List of individual dogs
