= 114th Pennsylvania Infantry Regiment =

Union Army infantry regiment

114th Regiment, Pennsylvania Volunteer Infantry
- Flag of the United States(Union) from 1863-1865
- Active: 1862–1865
- Disbanded: May 29, 1865
- Country: United States of America
- Allegiance: Union
- Branch: United States Army
- Type: Infantry Zouaves
- Part of: 1st Brigade, 1st Division, III Corps, Army of the Potomac (1862–1865); 1st Brigade, 2nd Division, 5th Army Corps (1865)
- Nickname: Zouaves d' Afrique Collis Zouaves
- Engagements: Battle of Fredericksburg; Chancellorsville; Gettysburg; Wilderness; Spottsylvania Court House; Cold Harbor; Petersburg

Commanders
- Commander: Col. Charles H. T. Collis

Insignia
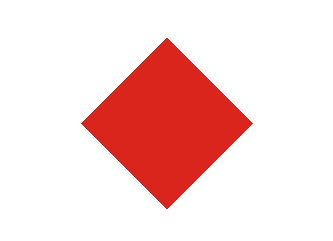
- III Corps (1st Division) badge

The 114th Regiment, Pennsylvania Volunteer Infantry was an infantry regiment that served in the Union Army during the American Civil War. They were notable for their colorful Americanized version of the Zouave uniform worn in emulation of certain French light-infantry units that became world-famous during France's colonization of North Africa, the Crimean War, and the Second War of Italian Independence fought in the years prior to the American Civil War.

== History ==
The 114th Pennsylvania was the brain-child of Charles H. T. Collis, an Irish immigrant who settled in Philadelphia and became a prominent young lawyer. Collis initially raised only a small company of men calling them the "Zouaves d'Afrique" which served while attached to other regiments. They saw action in the 1862 Shenandoah Valley Campaign, the Battle of Cedar Mountain, and the Battle of Antietam. The "Zouaves d'Afrique" were much admired for their military bearing and prowess in battle to the point that it was decided to raise a full-sized regiment which was given the numeric designation of 114th Volunteer Infantry.

Like other Zouave regiments raised in the larger cities of America, the 114th attracted some immigrants to its ranks who were veterans of European wars, but the rank and file consisted mostly of American-born citizens from Philadelphia and its surrounding counties.

In the winter of 1862 the regiment participated in the Battle of Fredericksburg. There they took part in a counterattack by Robinson's brigade of the III Corps to relieve General George G. Meade's division from potential disaster. When the Zouaves began to falter in their charge against the Confederate line, Colonel Collis seized the regiment's national colors and urged the men on. Their counterattack stalled, then they pushed back, the Confederate advance thereby saving a Federal artillery battery from capture. For his actions in this battle Colonel Collis would belatedly receive the Medal of Honor in 1893.

The regiment would also take a prominent role in the Battle of Chancellorsville the following spring where they would endure their greatest number of casualties during any battle of the war. During the fighting, Colonel Collis, suffering from the effects of malaria, was observed being removed from the field on a stretcher by some officers who were personal enemies. After the battle they falsely accused Collis of cowardice in the face of the enemy although he had managed to command the regiment through most of the battle even while gravely ill. He was later brought to Court-martial to face these accusations but he successfully defended himself, introducing witnesses who could attest that he had served faithfully under fire during most of the battle until he collapsed from exhaustion due to his reoccurring problems with malaria. Collis was fully exonerated and allowed to return to duty, however his lingering illness would prevent him from participating with his regiment at the Battle of Gettysburg. There the 114th would lose 155 men out of the 312 involved while defending the Peach Orchard salient.

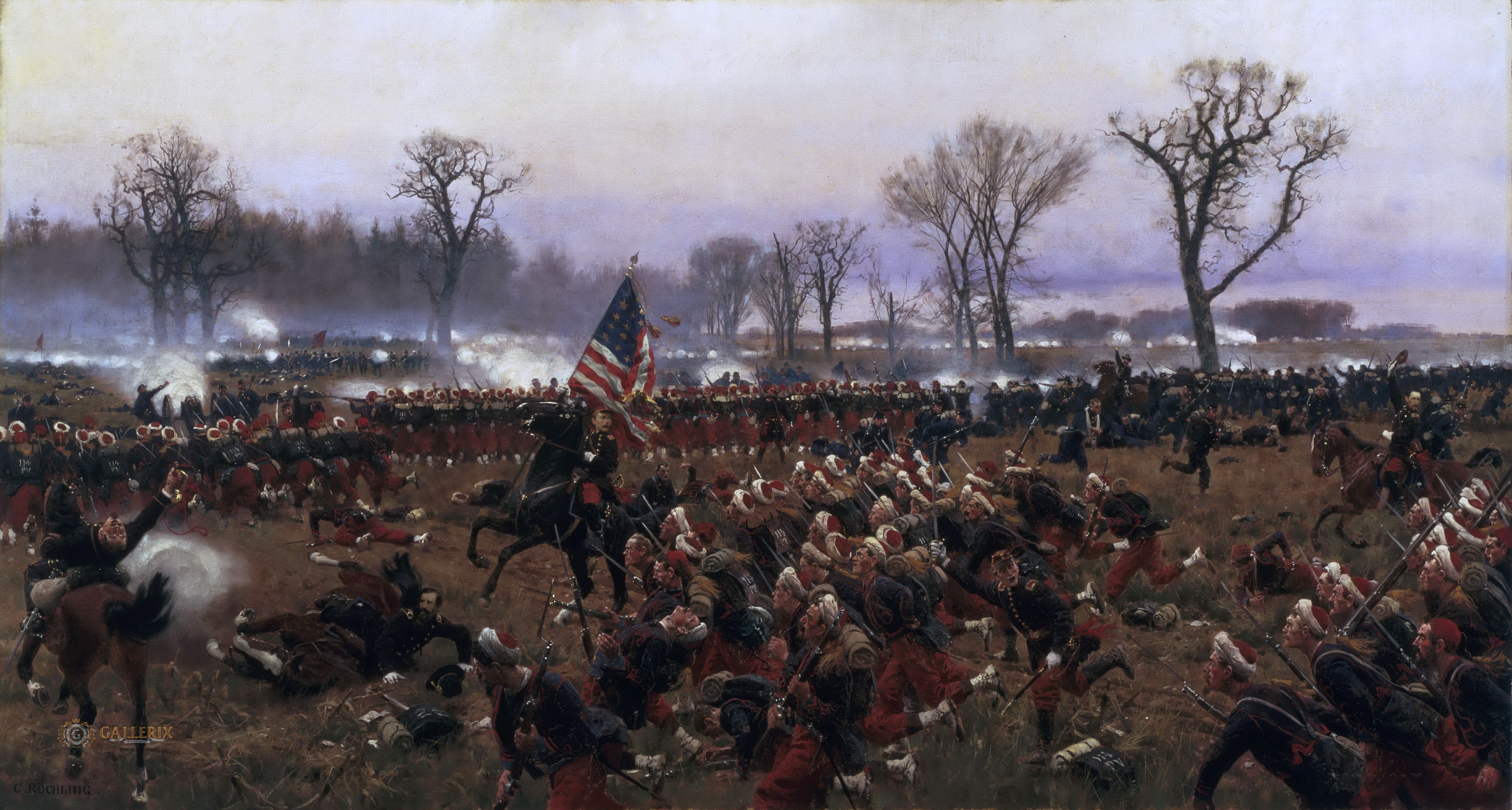
The 114th Pennsylvania Infantry during the assault on Prospect Hill at the Battle of Fredericksburg, December 13th 1862

Significantly reduced in size, the regiment became part of an independent brigade after the III Corps was dissolved. During the remaining two years of the war the unit would often provide provost and guard duties at General Meade's headquarters in the field. This was due in part to the unit's colorful uniform and military bearing, but more so because General Meade, himself a Philadelphia native, was particularly fond of the 114th's regimental band which was considered one of the best in the Army of the Potomac. During the army's winter encampment of 1863–64 at Brandy Station, Virginia, and later during the 1864–65 Siege of Petersburg, companies of the regiment would be frequently called away to serve as headquarters guards. As a result, they attracted the attention of several of the wartime photographers who would make them the most photographed Zouave unit in the field during the war.

At the conclusion of hostilities in the Eastern Theater the 114th Pennsylvania was transferred into the famed Zouave Brigade of the Army of the Potomac's V Corps. They would lead the brightly clad brigade which consisted of several Zouave regiments, each wearing a different style and color of Zouave uniform, in the Grand Review of the Armies on May 23, 1865, held in Washington, D.C. They were then sent home to Philadelphia where they mustered out of service.

== Uniform ==
The 114th Pennsylvania's uniform from top to bottom began with a red Moroccan style fez with a yellow-gold tassel worn crushed downward on the back of the head like a skull cap. Some men were issued fezzes that were too large so they compensated by turning up the brim giving the fez the appearance of a beanie. For dress parade and guard mount duty, the fez was augmented with a white turban which was wound around the head in Arabic style. Although the turban was not worn on the march or in battle it has often been erroneously portrayed as such in post-war art.

The collarless jacket was dark blue with sky blue cuffs and red trim. Arabesque designs on the jacket breasts were called tombeaux and gave the appearance of large false pockets trimmed in red.

A sky blue sash was worn wrapped tightly around the waist with Chasseur style madder red trousers, white leggings (gaiters), and leather jambières rounding out the ensemble.

The material for the uniforms was imported from France by Colonel Collis himself.

== Legacy ==
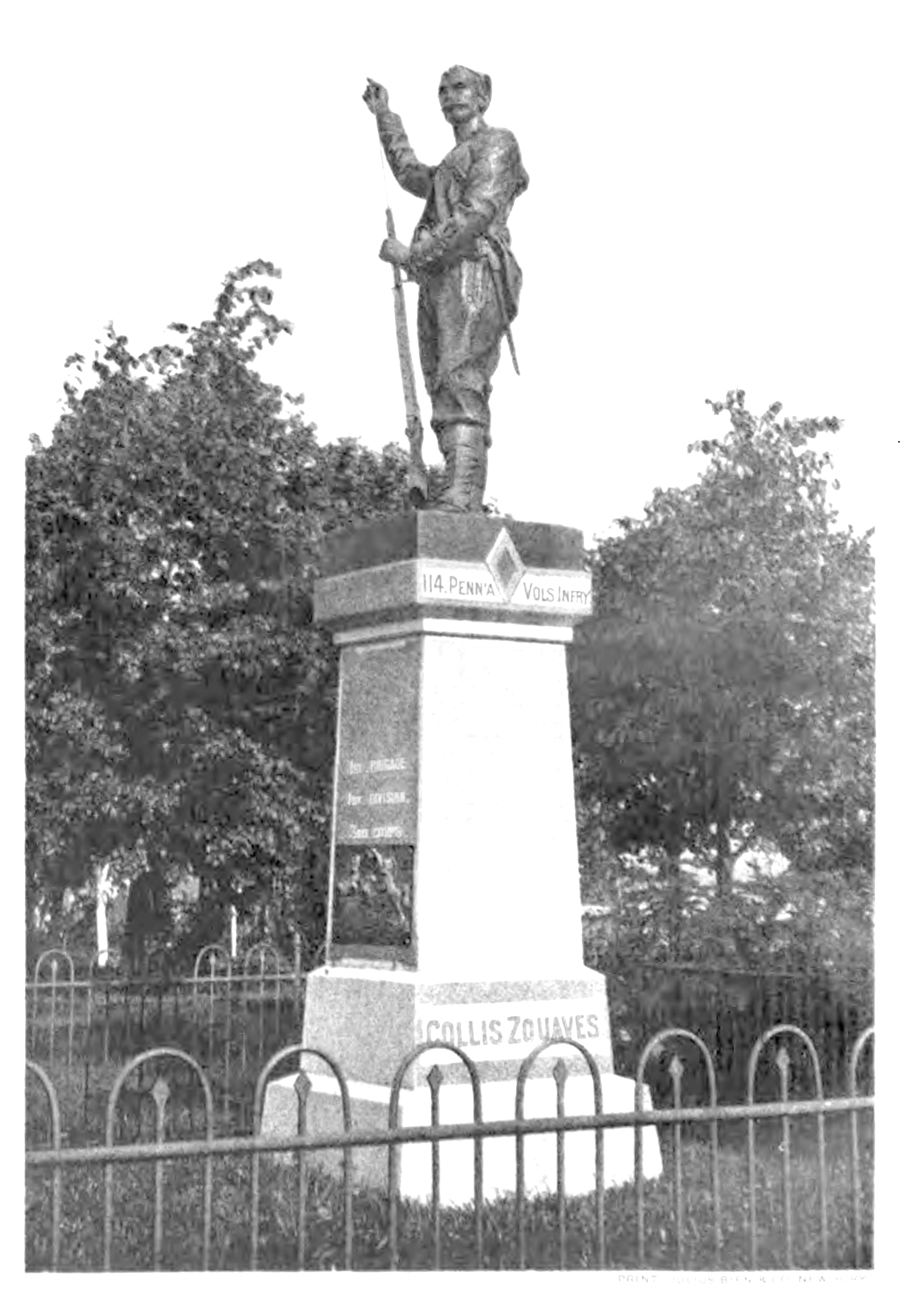
114th regiment Pennsylvania at Gettysburg monument with Zouve statue by Edward A. Kretschman (1849-1923)

.

Ultimately, the 114th Pennsylvania Infantry would leave its mark on the American landscape, with its veterans erecting three monuments in memory of comrades lost in battle. The regimental monument by sculptor Edward A. Kretschman (1849-1923) was erected in 1886 under the auspices of the Commonwealth of Pennsylvania at Gettysburg and is located at 39°48.209′N 77°14.926′W.

In early 2006, Kretschman's bronze statue of the Zouave, atop a granite pedestal, was toppled to the ground by vandals in an unprecedented attack that also heavily damaged two other monuments on the field. Due in part to donations from private citizens, the damage was quickly repaired and the statue returned to its place.

The veterans placed another smaller marker at Gettysburg in 1886 to mark the place on Cemetery Ridge that the regiment occupied on the final day of the battle.

A final monument was placed on the Chancellorsville battlefield by the 114th veterans in 1898 to mark one of several locations the unit fought during that engagement.

== See also ==
- List of Pennsylvania Civil War regiments
