= William Lock (disambiguation) =

William Lock may refer to:

- William Lock (1858–1940), Mayor of Nelson, New Zealand.
- William Lock (MP) (?1687–1761), MP for Great Grimsby (UK Parliament constituency)

== See also ==
- William Locke (disambiguation)
