= Hiram H. De Lavie =

U.S Soldier

Hiram H. Delavie
- Born: 1824; Stark County, Ohio
- Died: 1902 (aged 77–78); Pittsburgh, Pennsylvania
- Burial place: Saint Peters Cemetery
- Military career
- Allegiance: United States of America
- Branch: United States Army
- Rank: Sergeant
- Unit: 11th Pennsylvania Volunteer Infantry Regiment - Company I
- Conflicts: Battle of Five Forks
- Awards: Medal of Honor

Sergeant Hiram H. De Lavie (also known as Hiram Adam Delavie or Adam Delavie) (1824 – 1902) was an American soldier who fought in the American Civil War. De Lavie received the country's highest award for bravery during combat, the Medal of Honor, for his action during the Battle of Five Forks in Virginia on 1 April 1865. He was honored with the award on 10 May 1865.

== Biography ==
De Lavie was born in Stark County, Ohio in 1824. He enlisted into the 11th Pennsylvania Infantry. He died in 1902 and his remains are interred at the Saint Peters Cemetery in Pittsburgh, Pennsylvania.

== Medal of Honor citation ==
Capture of flag.

== See also ==
- List of American Civil War Medal of Honor recipients: A–F
