= Richard Coulter (general) =

American Army general (1827–1908)

Richard Coulter Sr.
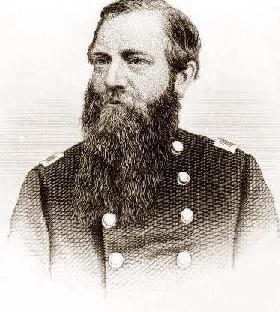
- Born: October 1, 1827; Greensburg, Pennsylvania
- Died: October 14, 1908 (aged 81)
- Burial place: St. Clair Cemetery near Greensburg
- Military career
- Allegiance: United States
- Branch: United States Army; Union Army
- Service years: 1847–1848, 1861–1865
- Rank: Colonel; Brevet Major General
- Unit: 2nd Pennsylvania Volunteers
- Commands: 11th Pennsylvania Infantry; 3rd Brigade, 2nd Division, I Corps; 2nd Brigade, 2nd Division, I Corps; 2nd Brigade, 2nd Division, V Corps; 2nd Division, V Corps; 2nd Brigade, 3rd Division, V Corps; 3rd Brigade, 3rd Division, V Corps
- Conflicts: Mexican–American War; American Civil War

Richard Coulter Sr. (October 1, 1827 – October 14, 1908) was an American Civil War Colonel and brevet brigadier general of volunteers in the Union Army, a businessman, and banker. During the Civil War, he was colonel of the 11th Pennsylvania Infantry, often rising to brigade command upon the wounding of superior officers. In 1866, he was nominated and confirmed as a brevet major general of volunteers to rank from April 1, 1865.

== Early life and career ==
Richard Coulter, Sr. was born in Greensburg, Pennsylvania, a son of Eli Coulter Jr. (1791–1830) and Rebecca Alexander. Eli Coulter was a prominent businessman and managed a steam mill in Greensburg. Richard attended Jefferson College in Washington, Pennsylvania. After leaving college in 1845 at the age of 19, he worked in the law office of his uncle, Richard Coulter (1788–1852) in Greensburg, where he remained until the beginning of the Mexican–American War.

Coulter enrolled in the Westmoreland Guards, a local militia company that was mustered into the United States Army as Company E of the Second Pennsylvania Volunteer Infantry Regiment. It was one of only two regiments sent from Pennsylvania to serve in Mexico. Coulter saw action under General Winfield Scott in the Siege of Vera Cruz and the subsequent battles of Cerro Gordo, Contreras, Churubusco, and Chapultepec, and the capture and occupation of Mexico City in 1847. He served directly under future Civil War general John W. Geary, a man he had little respect for due to his vanity.

After the Mexican War, the regiment returned to Pennsylvania in June 1848. Coulter then resumed his study of law and was admitted to the bar in 1849. His uncle had become a Pennsylvania Supreme Court judge in 1846, and Coulter took over his uncle's law practice in Greensburg. He practiced law until the beginning of the Civil War in 1861. Throughout the 1850s, he remained active in the local militia.

== Civil War ==
With the outbreak of the war and the subsequent calls to arms by President Abraham Lincoln and then by the Governor of Pennsylvania, Andrew Curtin, Coulter raised a company of soldiers and was elected as their first captain. The company soon was made part of the 11th Pennsylvania Volunteers, in which Coulter was promoted to lieutenant colonel on April 26, 1861. When the regiment was reorganized as a three-year regiment on November 27, 1861, Coulter became the regimental commander until the end of the war in 1865. Coulter's regiment fought at Cedar Mountain, Thoroughfare Gap, and Second Bull Run. At the Battle of Antietam, Coulter assumed command of the 3rd Brigade, 2nd Division, I Corps when Brig. Gen. George L. Hartsuff was wounded. Returning to regimental command Coulter fought at Fredericksburg and Chancellorsville, being wounded in the former. At the battle of Gettysburg Coulter assumed command of the 1st Brigade, 2nd Division, I Corps when Brig. Gen. Gabriel R. Paul and all other ranking officers were wounded on July 1 near Oak Ridge. Coulter himself was wounded but retained brigade commanded until July 3 when he briefly turned over command before resuming command the same day.

At the start of the 1864 Overland Campaign, Coulter was in command of his regiment but once again assumed brigade command (2nd Brigade, 2nd Division, V Corps) at the Wilderness when Brig. Gen. Henry Baxter was wounded on the second day of the battle. At Spotsylvania he assumed command of the 2nd Division, V Corps when Brig. Gen. John C. Robinson was wounded and led the division for two days before returning to brigade command. On May 18, 1864, Coulter received a wound that incapacitated him for the next several months. On December 12, 1864, President Abraham Lincoln nominated Coulter for appointment to the grade of brevet brigadier general of volunteers, to rank from August 1, 1864, and the United States Senate confirmed the appointment on February 20, 1865. During the siege of Petersburg Coulter briefly returned to the front in command of the 2nd Brigade, 3rd Division, V Corps at the battle of Globe Tavern. His final command appointment was the 3rd Brigade, 3rd Division, V Corps during the Appomattox Campaign. He was mustered out of the volunteer services on July 1, 1865. On May 31, 1866, President Andrew Johnson nominated Coulter for appointment to the grade of brevet major general of volunteers, to rank from April 1, 1865, for his service at the Battle of Five Forks and the United States Senate confirmed the appointment on July 23, 1866.

== Postwar career ==
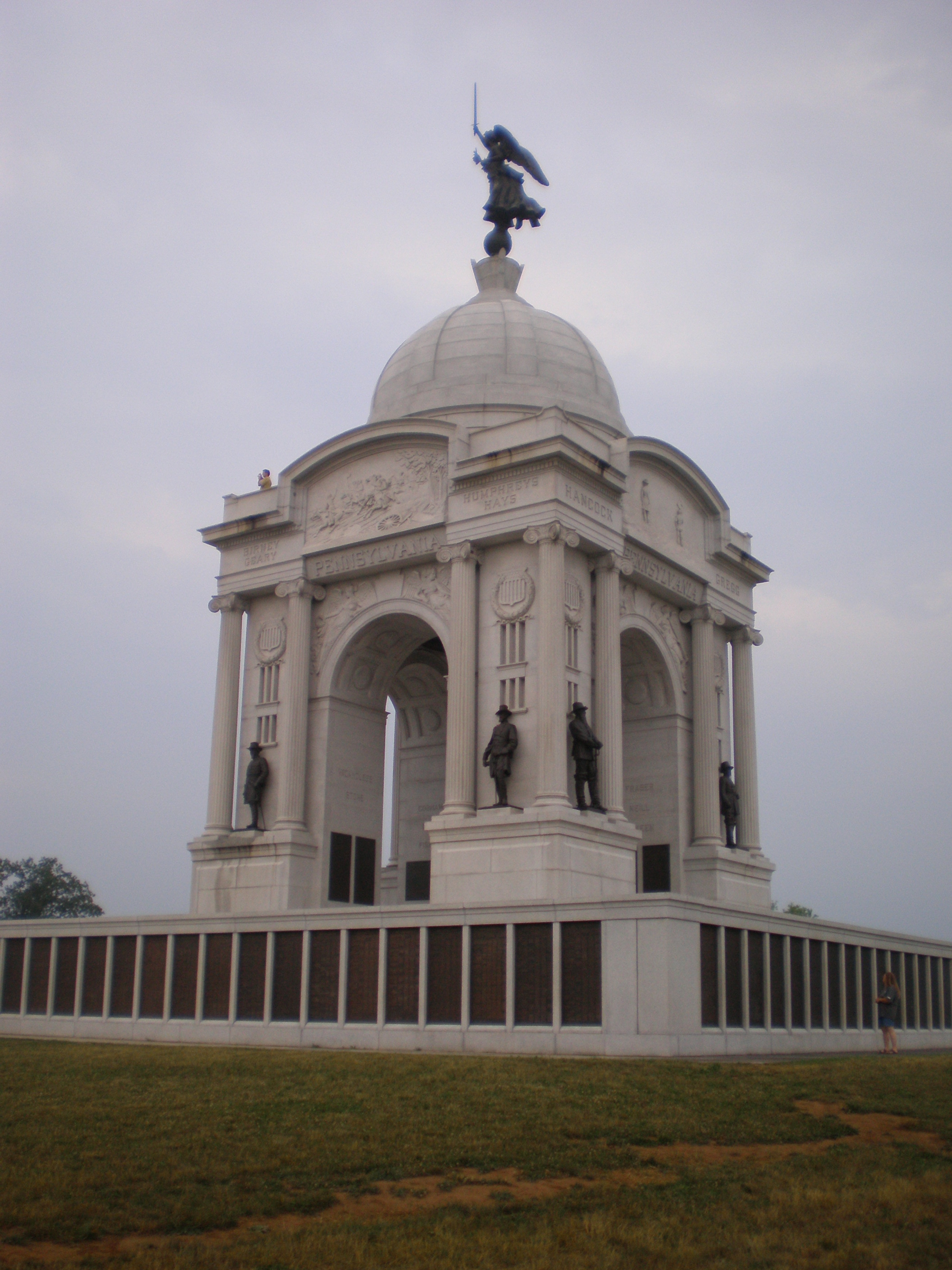
Pennsylvania Monument at the Gettysburg National Military Park

After the Civil War, Coulter returned to Greensburg, where he became active in business. He joined with several other local financiers to invest in various industries, businesses, and residential areas in and around Greensburg. Coulter began a partnership with George Franklin Huff, a local businessman and financier who later became a state senator and a U.S. congressman. Coulter and Huff collaborated on several of the largest and most significant companies in Westmoreland County in the 1880s, including the Keystone Coal and Coke Company, the Greensburg-Hempfield Electric Street Railway, and the First National Bank of Greensburg (now the First Commonwealth Bank). Coulter served at the bank's president until his death in 1908. His son, Richard Coulter Jr. (1870–1955) took over as president and held that position for more than 40 years.

Greensburg was located on a large vein of bituminous coal about 30 miles east of Pittsburgh. Coal and coke were needed for steel mills that were built in and near Pittsburgh in the 1860s and 1870s. Coulter and Huff prospered with the rising steel industry by developing and mining the coalfields in Westmoreland County.

General Coulter married Emmy Welty (1841–1929) and had six children—Richard Coulter Jr., Rebecca, Henry, Alexander, William, and Margaret.

== Memorial ==
Coulter is memorialized on the Pennsylvania State Monument at Gettysburg National Military Park.

As the "most famous Civil War veteran" from Westmoreland County, Pennsylvania, Coulter's grave was featured by the Westmoreland County Historical Society's celebration of the 150th Anniversary of the Civil War.

== See also ==
- List of American Civil War brevet generals (Union)
