= Canine Good Citizen =

American Kennel Club program

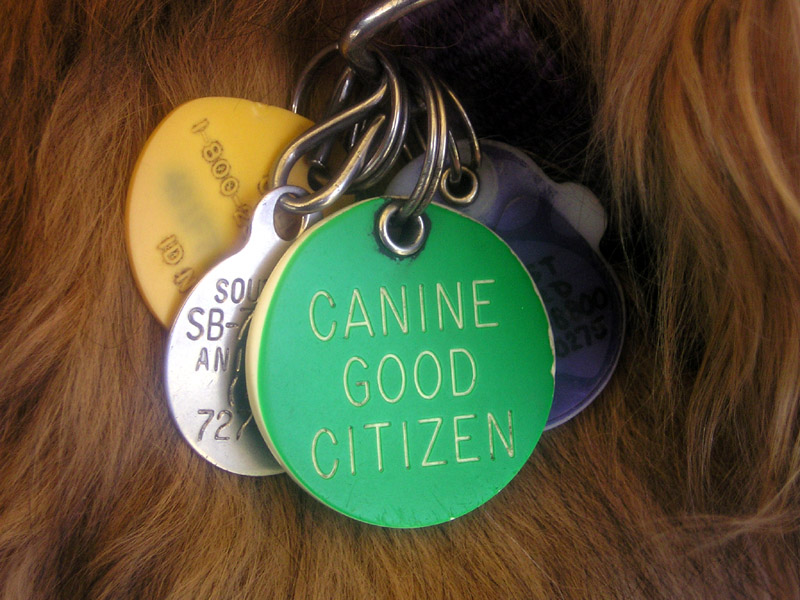
- Canine Good Citizen dogtag
- Acronym: CGC
- Purpose: Determining dog aggression
- Year started: 1989; 37 years ago
- Restrictions on attempts: Must pass all 10 exercises in a single attempt. Can retry test as desired.
- Regions: United States
- Fee: Nominal fee varies by tester

The Canine Good Citizen (CGC) program, established in 1989, is an American Kennel Club program to promote responsible dog ownership and to encourage the training of well-mannered dogs. A dog and handler team must take a short behavioral evaluation of less than half an hour; dogs who pass the evaluation earn the Canine Good Citizen certificate, which many people represent after the dog's name, abbreviating it as CGC; for example, "Fido, CGC".

The evaluation consists of ten objectives. All items must be completed satisfactorily or the team fails. Test items include:

- Accepting a friendly stranger.
- Sitting politely for petting.
- Allowing basic grooming procedures.
- Walking on a loose lead.
- Walking through a crowd.
- Sitting and lying down on command and staying in place.
- Coming when called.
- Reacting appropriately to walking by a dog and person.
- Reacting appropriately to distractions.
- Calmly enduring supervised separation from the owner.

Evaluators sometimes combine elements during the actual test. If a dog fails the test initially, owners can continue training with their dog and retake for the test in the future.

If all ten objectives are met, the handler can apply for a certificate and special dog pet tag from the AKC stating that the dog has earned the CGC.

Dogs do not have to be registered with the AKC to earn a CGC, nor do they have to be purebred or, in fact, registered with any canine organization. The goal is to promote responsible dog ownership for all dogs.

Since its inception, the CGC program has become the model for similar programs around the world, is the base for other exams, such as those given for therapy dogs, and is used as a starting point for more advanced dog training.

== See also ==
- Behaviour and Personality Assessment in Dogs
