= 11th Pennsylvania Infantry Regiment =

Union Army infantry regiment

- Active: April 26, 1861 - July 1, 1865
- Country: United States
- Allegiance: Union
- Branch: United States Army/Union Army
- Type: Infantry
- Part of: Army of the Potomac
- Nickname: "The Bloody Eleventh"
- Mascot: Sallie (dog)
- Engagements: Battle of Hoke's Run; Battle of Bunker Hill (1861); Battle of Cedar Mountain; Battle of Thoroughfare Gap; Second Battle of Bull Run; Battle of Antietam; Battle of Fredericksburg; Battle of Chancellorsville; Battle of Gettysburg; Battle of the Wilderness; Battle of Spotsylvania Court House; Battle of North Anna; Battle of Cold Harbor; Battle of Hatcher's Run; Siege of Petersburg; Battle of Five Forks; Appomattox Campaign

Commanders
- Notable commanders: Richard Coulter

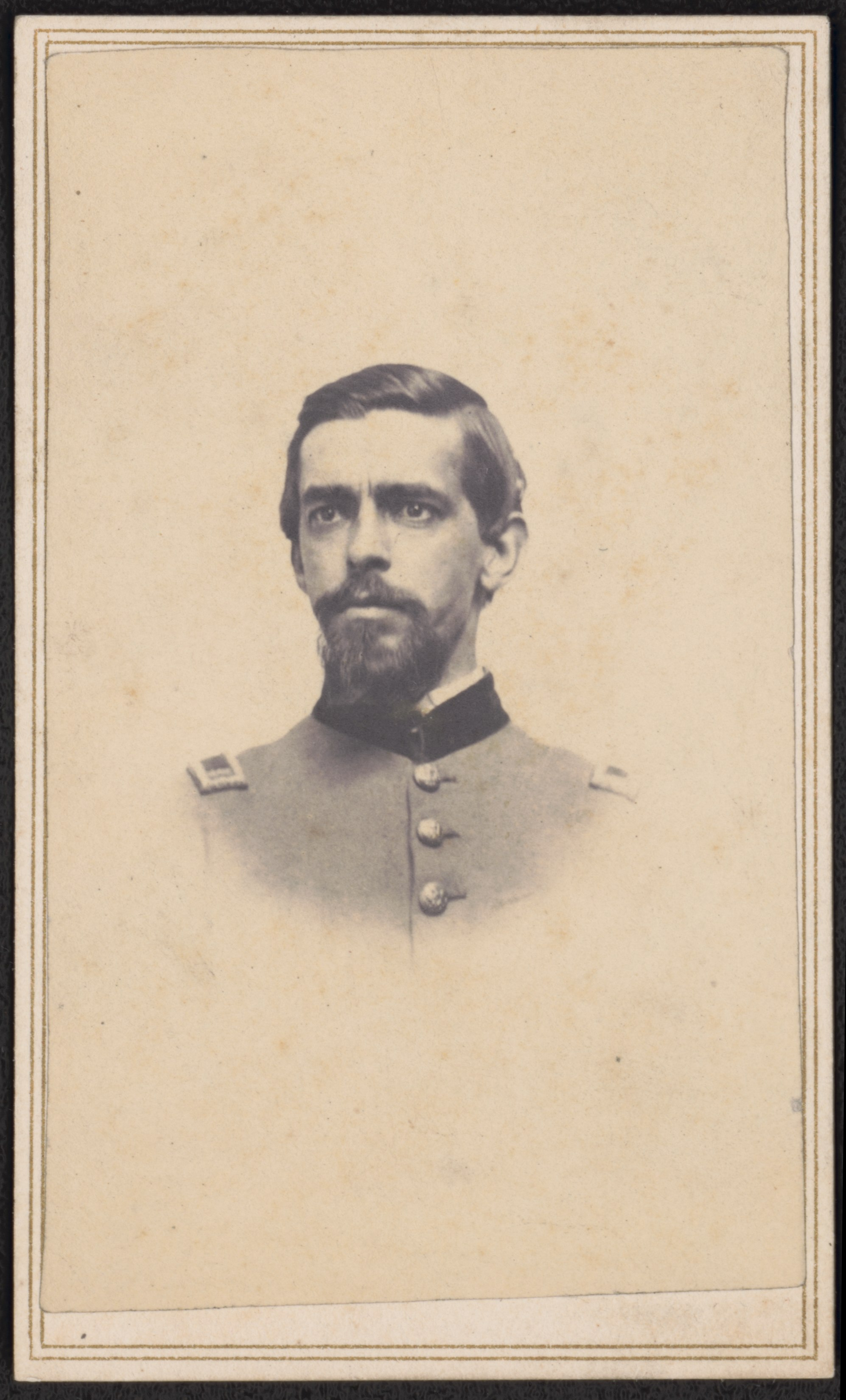
Lieutenant Colonel John B. Johnson of Co. E, 11th Pennsylvania Infantry Regiment. From the Liljenquist Family Collection of Civil War Photographs, Prints and Photographs Division, Library of Congress

The 11th Pennsylvania Infantry Regiment was a Union army regiment that participated in the American Civil War. It had the distinction of being the oldest unit in continuous service from Pennsylvania.

== History ==
The 11th Pennsylvania was recruited from several counties in Pennsylvania as a three-month regiment on April 26, 1861, and sent to Camp Curtin, Harrisburg for training and organization. Phaon Jarrett served as its first colonel, with Richard Coulter as lieutenant colonel and William D. Earnest as major. It was assigned to Robert Patterson's Army of the Shenandoah. The regiment received the nickname "The Bloody Eleventh" at the Battle of Hoke's Run, Virginia, July 2, 1861.

The 11th was reorganized as a three-year regiment in the August of the same year at Camp Curtin in Harrisburg. After a few weeks of drill, the regiment was given garrison duty at Annapolis, Maryland. In April, it was moved to Mannassas Junction, where it guarded the railroad. It was again transferred, this time to the Shenandoah Valley, in late May as part of Irvin McDowell's Corps. They fought in the Battles of Cedar Mountain and Second Bull Run.

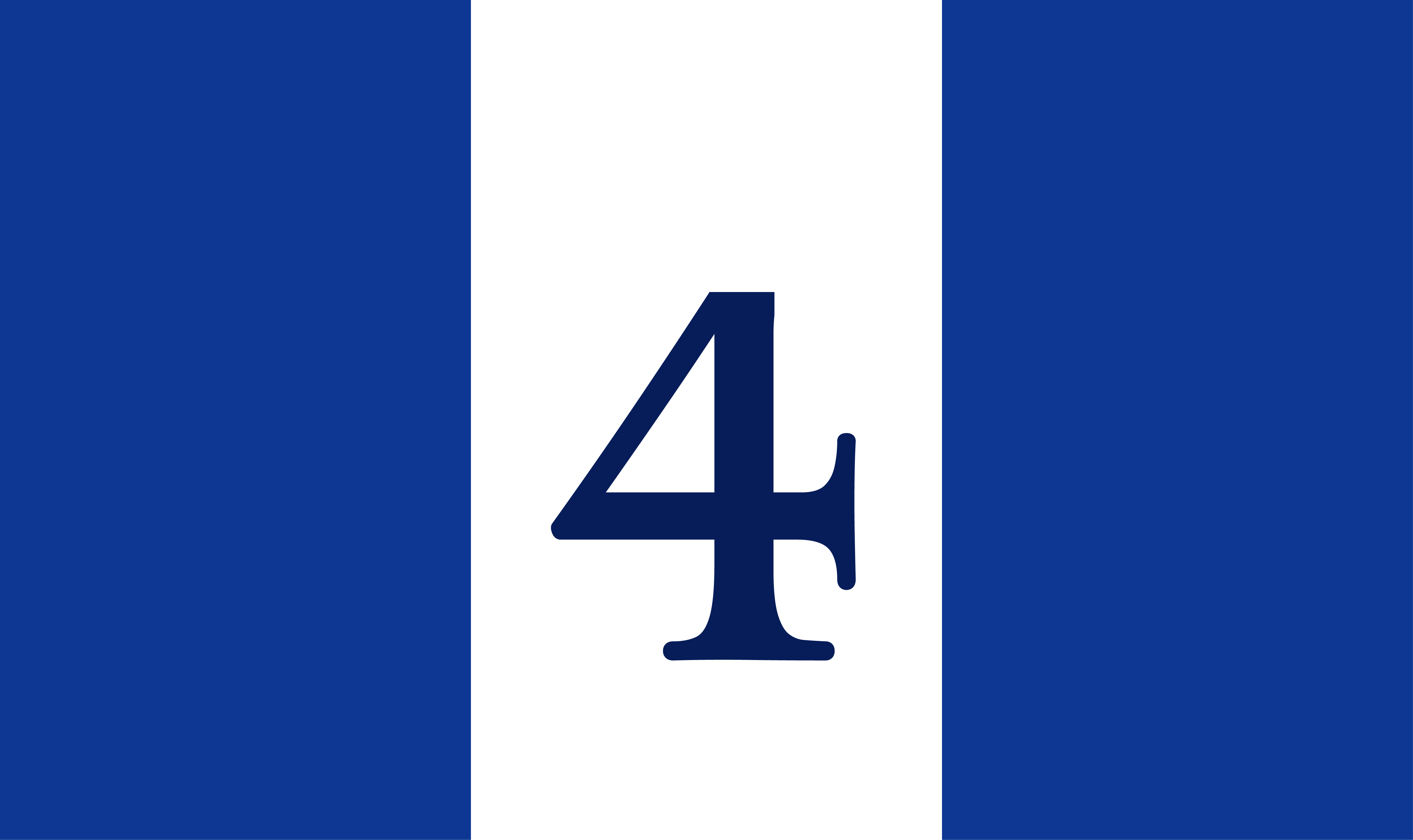
Digital remake of the flag Carried by Private William H. West during the Second Battle of Run. It stands for the 4th Regiment, 3rd Brigade, 2nd Division

After the Army of Virginia was merged into the Army of the Potomac, the reconstituted regiment became part of the I Corps. At Turner's Gap at the Battle of South Mountain, the 11th came under light fire only, losing two men wounded. At the Battle of Antietam three days later, it was heavily engaged on the Union right around the West Woods. In this battle, it lost 27 killed, 89 wounded, and two captured.

When the original three-year enlistment period expired in January 1864, many of the men re-enrolled in the regiment at the influence of Brig. Gen. Richard Coulter, a former colonel of the regiment. Because of this, the unit was designated "veteran volunteers." During the reorganization of the Army in the spring of 1864, the 11th became part of the V Corps, as the old I Corps had been disbanded, and surviving units transferred to the V Corps.

The 11th fought in multiple battles in the Eastern Theater, including Second Bull Run, Antietam, Chancellorsville, Gettysburg, Grant's Overland Campaign, the Siege of Petersburg, and the Appomattox Campaign. It was mustered out on July 1, 1865.

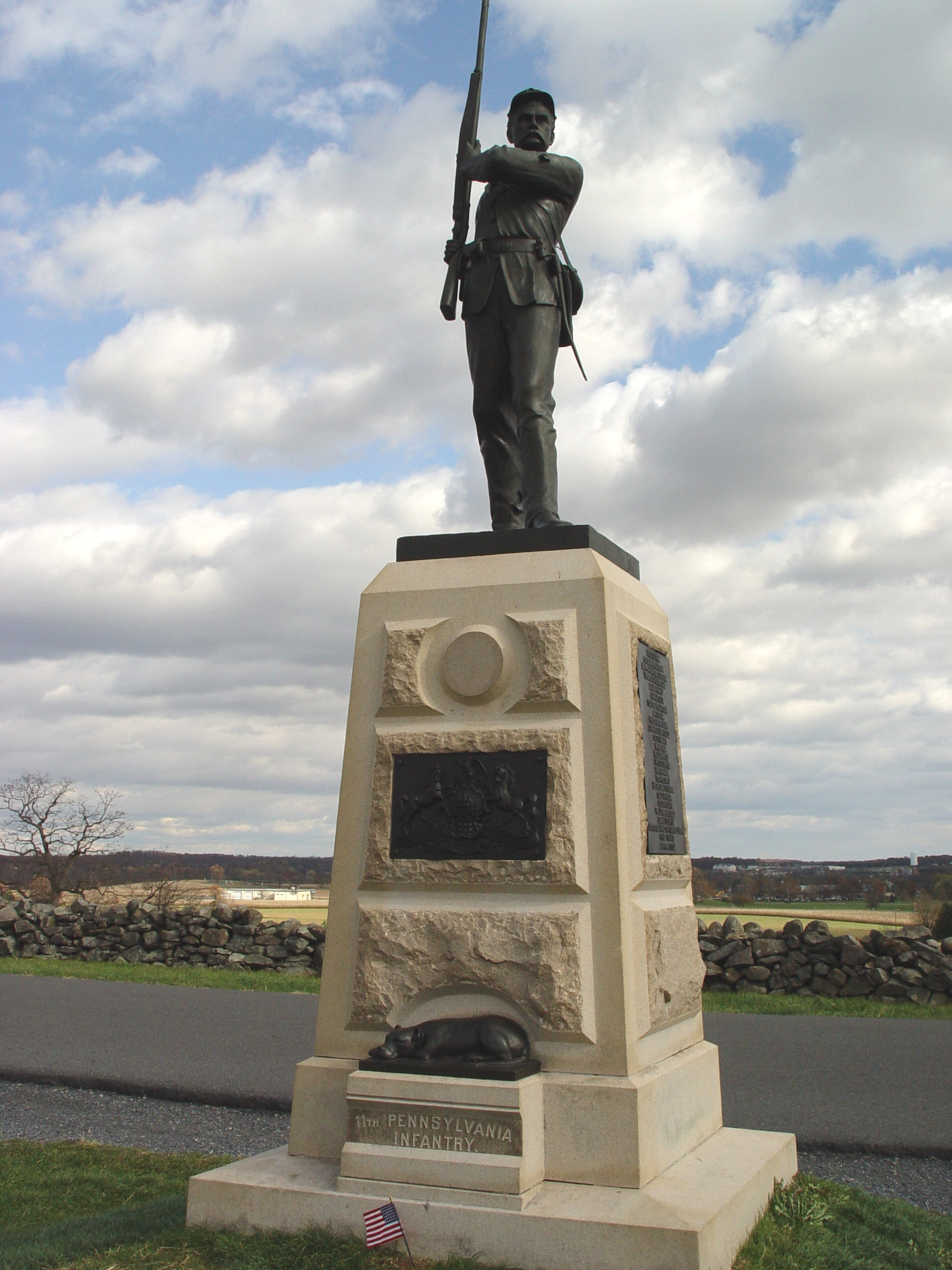
Monument to the 11th Pennsylvania Infantry Regiment by Edward A. Kretschman (1849-1923) at the Battle of Gettysburg. It is located off Doubleday Avenue on Oak Ridge in the Gettysburg National Military Park, Gettysburg, PA, USA. The location is near the right flank of the First Corps on July 1, 1863. Note the inclusion of the regimental mascot, Sallie (see info at left).

A total of 1,890 men served in the regiment during the war, and only 340 men were discharged at war's end.

Among the numerous casualties was one that would stand out as an undying remembrance of the unit and its loyalty to the cause. The regiment's beloved mascot, Sallie Ann Jarrett, "a brindle, bull-terrier" similar to today's American Staffordshire Terrier, traveled everywhere with the unit. "Sallie" was said to have hated three things — Rebels, Democrats, and Women. Her loyalty was undying, for at Gettysburg, after the battle on the First Day was over, Sallie, tired and hungry, ambled out to where her brave comrades had fought and died. She lay down with the dead until she was found, weak and close to death herself, on July 4, 1863. Her friends nursed her back to health, and she fought with the unit in every battle until she was mortally wounded at Hatcher's Run in February 1865. Although under a "murderous fire", several of the men gave her a proper burial where she fell. Never forgetting the most devoted member of their regiment, in 1890, the veterans of the 11th forever memorialized her by her bronze likeness being a part of their monument on Oak Ridge in the Gettysburg National Military Park created by Edward A. Kretschman (1849-1923), located off Doubleday Avenue on Oak Ridge in the Gettysburg National Military Park, Gettysburg, PA, USA. The location is near the right flank of the First Corps on July 1, 1863.

Casualties:

- Killed and mortally wounded: 12 officers, 224 enlisted men, 1 dog
- Wounded: ? officers, ? enlisted men
- Died of disease: 4 officers, 177 enlisted men
- Captured or missing: ? officers, ? enlisted men
- Total casualties: ? officers, ? enlisted men

== Notable members ==
The 11th Pennsylvania was commanded for most of its service by Colonel Richard Coulter.

Two of the regiment's men were awarded the Medal of Honor, both for capturing battle flags. Private George W. Reed (Note: George W. Reed (1831 – December 21, 1906) was captured during the Battle of Globe Tavern by a group of soldiers, including a color bearer, from the 24th North Carolina Infantry. When it became clear that the Confederates were lost, Reed convinced them to give him back his weapon and surrender themselves to him. They agreed, and he led them to the Union lines as his prisoners.) earned his at the Battle of Globe Tavern on August 21, 1864, and Sergeant Hiram H. De Lavie (Note: Hiram H. De Lavie (1824 – 1902) captured some Confederate colors during the Battle of Five Forks.) at the Battle of Five Forks on April 1, 1865.

William Henry Locke, the regimental chaplain, later wrote a history of the 11th Pennsylvania.

== Reenactors ==
Company A, 11th Pennsylvania Volunteer Infantry, is based in central Pennsylvania. A family oriented authentic progressive unit and part of 4th Regiment, Federal Volunteer Brigade.

Blue and Gray Brigade: Westmoreland County based organization; Currently portraying companies C and I of the 11th PVI; they are an authentic geared unit with The Third Regiment.

== See also ==
- List of Pennsylvania Civil War Units
