= William Henry Locke =

William Henry Locke was a chaplain for the Union during the American Civil War. In his book, The Story of the Regiment, he told the story of the 11th Pennsylvania Infantry Regiment.
