= Sallie Ann Jarrett =

American canine military mascot

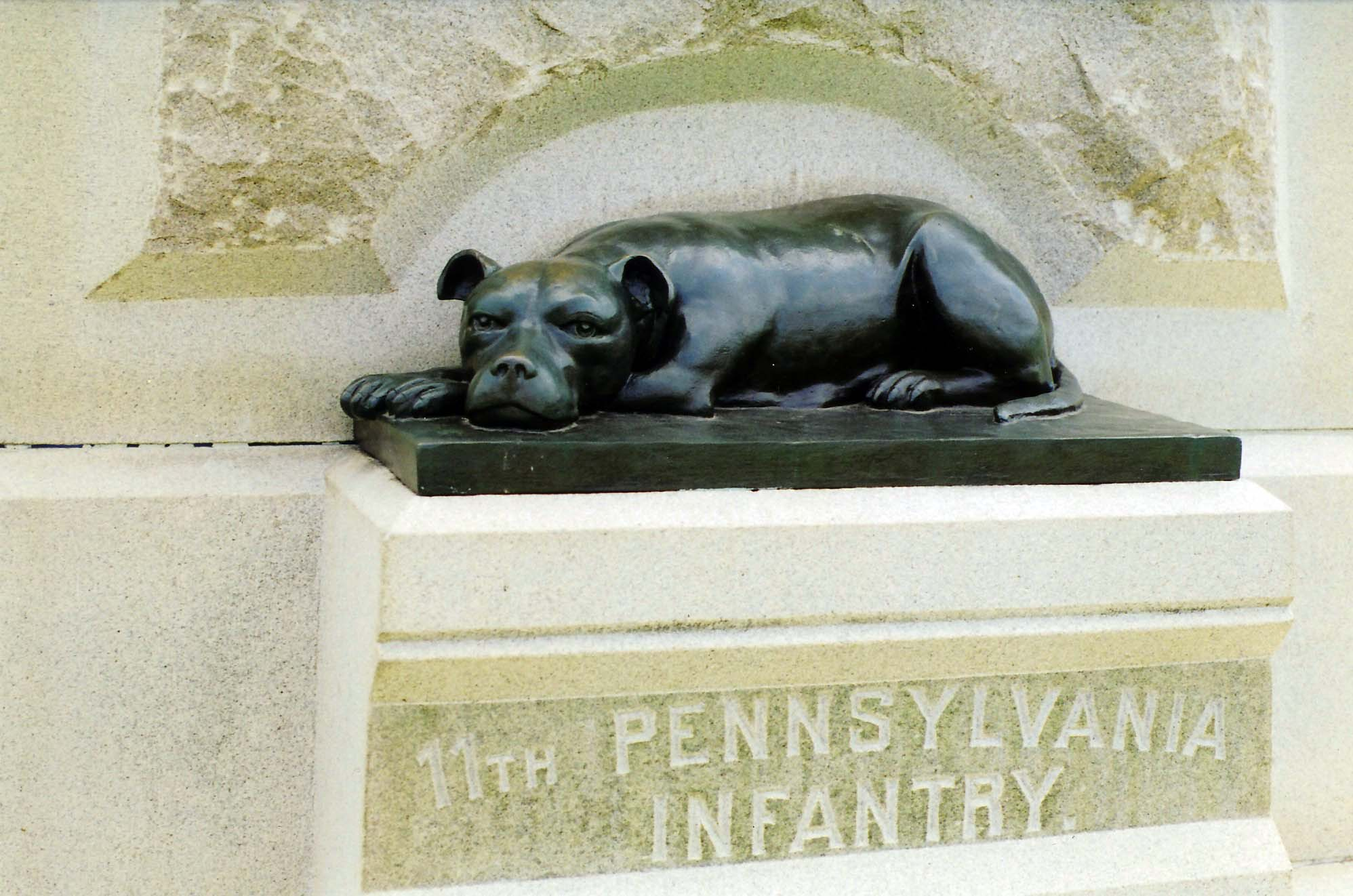
Sallie Ann Jarrett, Civil War mascot.

Sallie Ann Jarrett was the canine mascot of the 11th Pennsylvania Infantry, accompanying the soldiers throughout nearly the entire American Civil War, until she was killed in action in February 1865. Sallie, as the men would come to call her, was born in the spring of 1861 and was described by Colonel Richard Coulter as "a brindle, bull-terrier, of a fine breed," who "showed marks of blood." She was given to Capt. William R. Terry of Company I in May of that year by a resident of West Chester, Pennsylvania, where the regiment was training at Camp Wayne, on the town's former fairgrounds. The men named the pup in honor of two people, a young lady whom they admired and their original commanding officer, Colonel Phaon Jarrett.

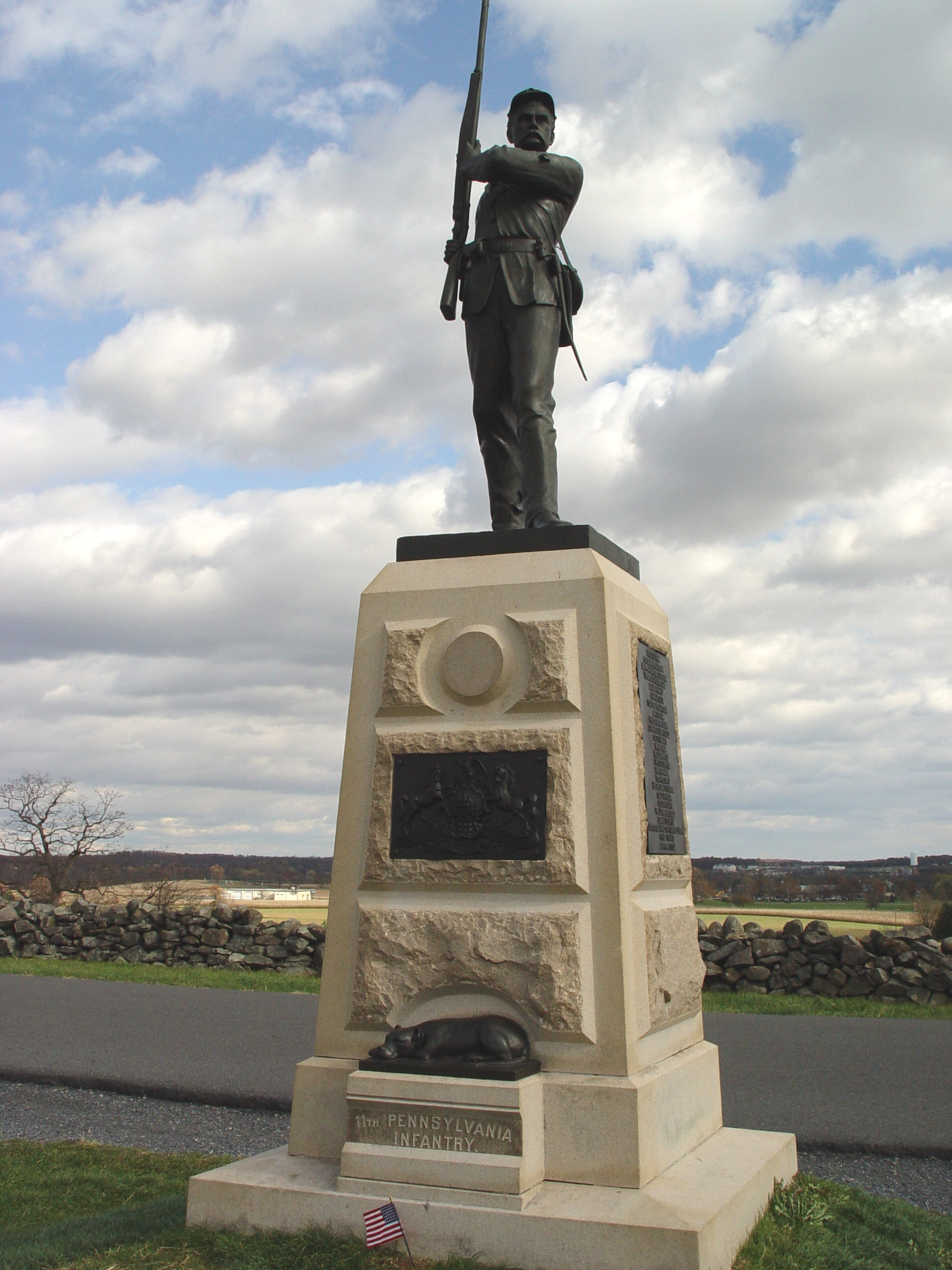
11th Pennsylvania Volunteer Infantry Monument, Gettysburg National Military Park

Sallie adapted quickly to army life, joining the soldiers at their drills and establishing her place beside the color guard for dress parade. Whenever the regiment left camp, her chosen position was at the head of the march with the horse ridden by Coulter, the regiment's colonel. Sallie quickly became known to other regiments brigaded with the 11th Pennsylvania as "Dick Coulter's dog." On two occasions, she marched with the regiment in review before President Abraham Lincoln.

With the soldiers, Sallie learned to endure the hardships of campaigning. She did not shrink from battle but accompanied the regiment into the fighting, taking a position at the front lines and barking furiously at the enemy. She saw action in each of her regiment's engagements, among them Cedar Mountain, Second Bull Run, Antietam, Fredericksburg, Chancellorsville, Gettysburg, the Wilderness, and Petersburg.

While with the regiment, Sallie also had a litter of pups five different times.

On July 1, 1863, the first day of fighting at Gettysburg, Sallie became separated from the regiment during the Union retreat to Cemetery Hill, and the soldiers feared she had been killed. But she had remained behind on Oak Ridge, where the 11th had fought on the first day, and it was there that she was found days later, still guarding her wounded and dead companions. Sallie was returned to her regiment and soldiered on until a few weeks before the war's end.

During the Battle of Spotsylvania Court House, Sallie was hit in the neck and treated by the surgeon. The ball could not be removed but Sallie survived and eventually the ball worked its way out.

On February 6, 1865, during the Union advance at Hatcher's Run, Virginia, she was struck by a bullet and killed. Despite being under heavy fire, several soldiers put aside their arms to bury her on the spot.

When the veterans of the 11th erected their monument on the Gettysburg Battlefield in 1890, a bronze statue of Sallie was included on a granite pedestal in a place of honor at the front of the monument. Her statue lies below the towering bronze figure of a skirmisher, recalling the soldiers who fought beside her and whom she guarded on Gettysburg's fields.

== See also ==
- List of individual dogs
