= Congenital cartilaginous rest of the neck =

- Other names: Cervical accessory tragus, wattle, cervical tab, cervical auricle
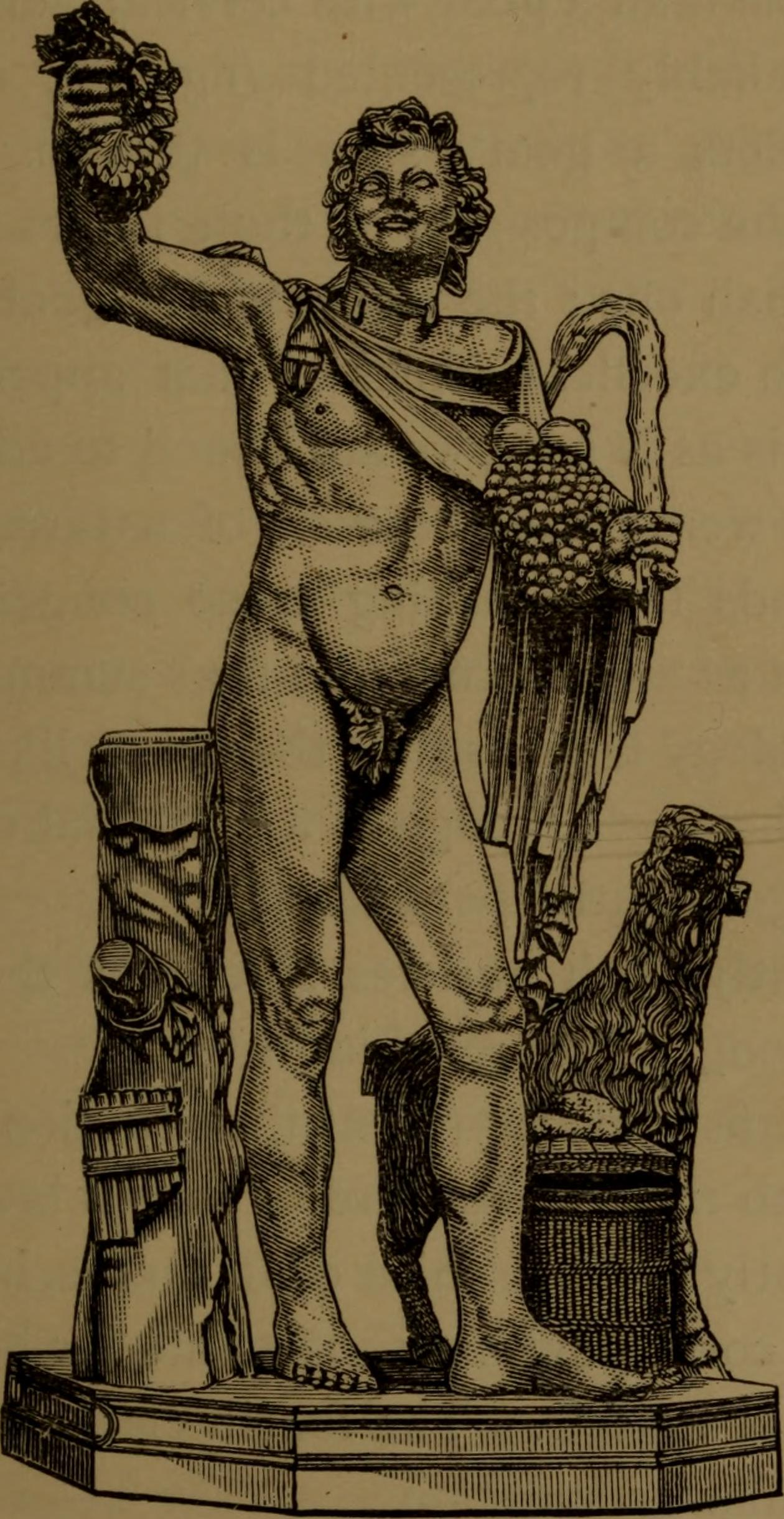
- Drawing of a man with two cervical auricles (from the book "Evolution and disease", 1890, page 91)
- Specialty: Dermatology

Congenital cartilaginous rest of the neck (CCRN) is a minor and very rare congenital cutaneous condition characterized by branchial arch remnants that are considered to be the cervical variant of accessory tragus. It resembles a rudimentary pinna that in most cases is located in the lower anterior part of the neck.

== Diagnosis ==
CCRN histopathology indicates the presence of elastic cartilage enclosed by various skin structures such as eccrine glands, adipose tissue, and pilosebaceous units. To assess the extent of the lesion as well as look for any underlying sinus tracts, ultrasonography alongside computed tomography (CT) scans can be used.

Alternative diagnoses for CCRN consist of thyroglossal duct cyst, hair follicle naevus, fibroepithelial polyp, and branchial cleft cyst. Thyroglossal duct cysts are typically found in the midline of the neck, near the hyoid bone, and move with tongue protrusion or swallowing. Hair follicle naevus appears as a single, skin-colored papule and can be associated with hypertrichosis. Fibroepithelial polyps are soft, fleshy growths of collagen fibers and blood vessels that hang off the skin. Branchial cleft cysts can manifest as cysts, fistulas, sinus tracts, or cartilaginous remnants on the front of the neck and upper chest.

== See also ==
- Congenital smooth muscle hamartoma
- List of cutaneous conditions
