= Visible spectrum =

Portion of the electromagnetic spectrum that is visible to the human eye

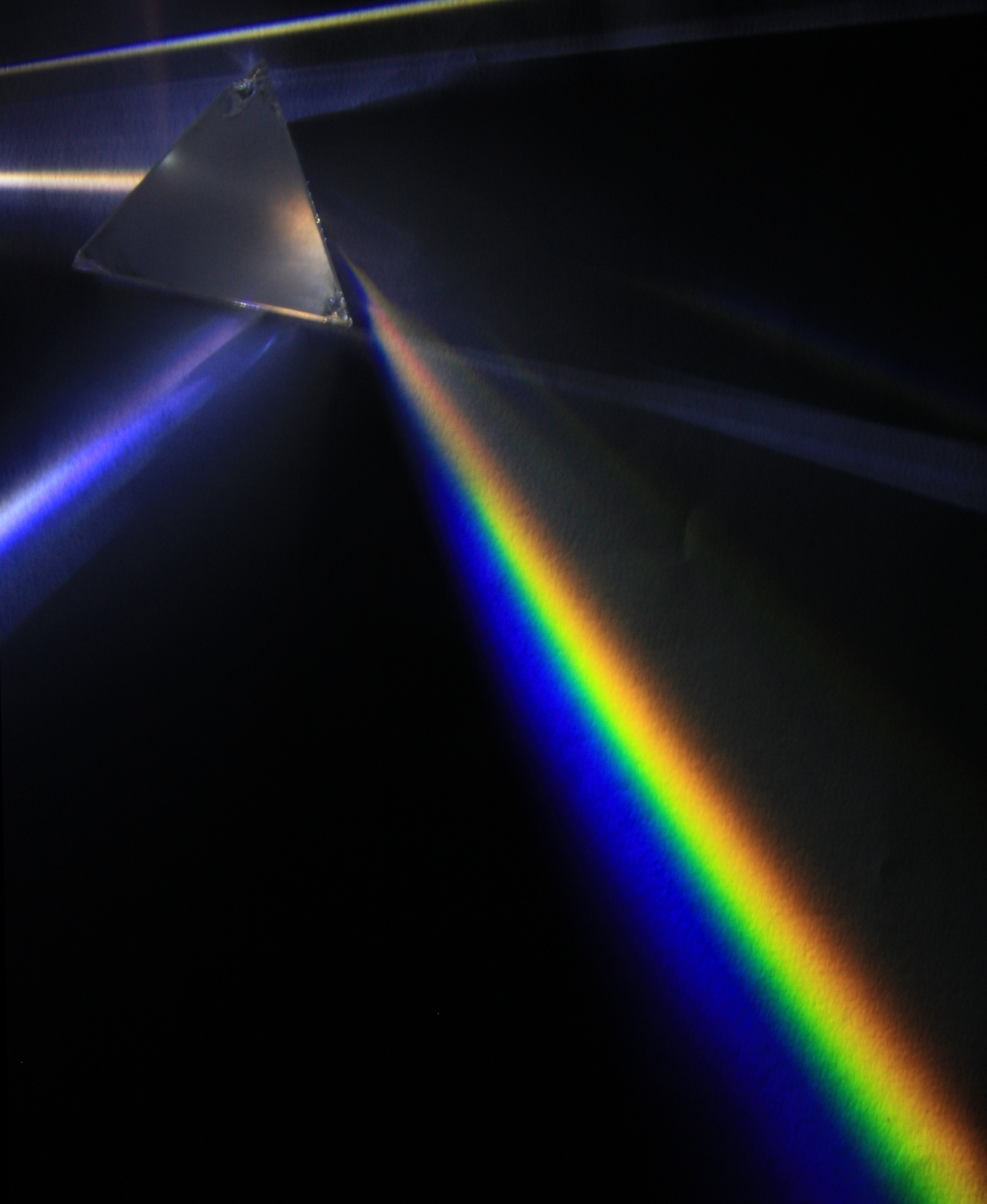
White light is dispersed by a glass prism into the colors of the visible spectrum.

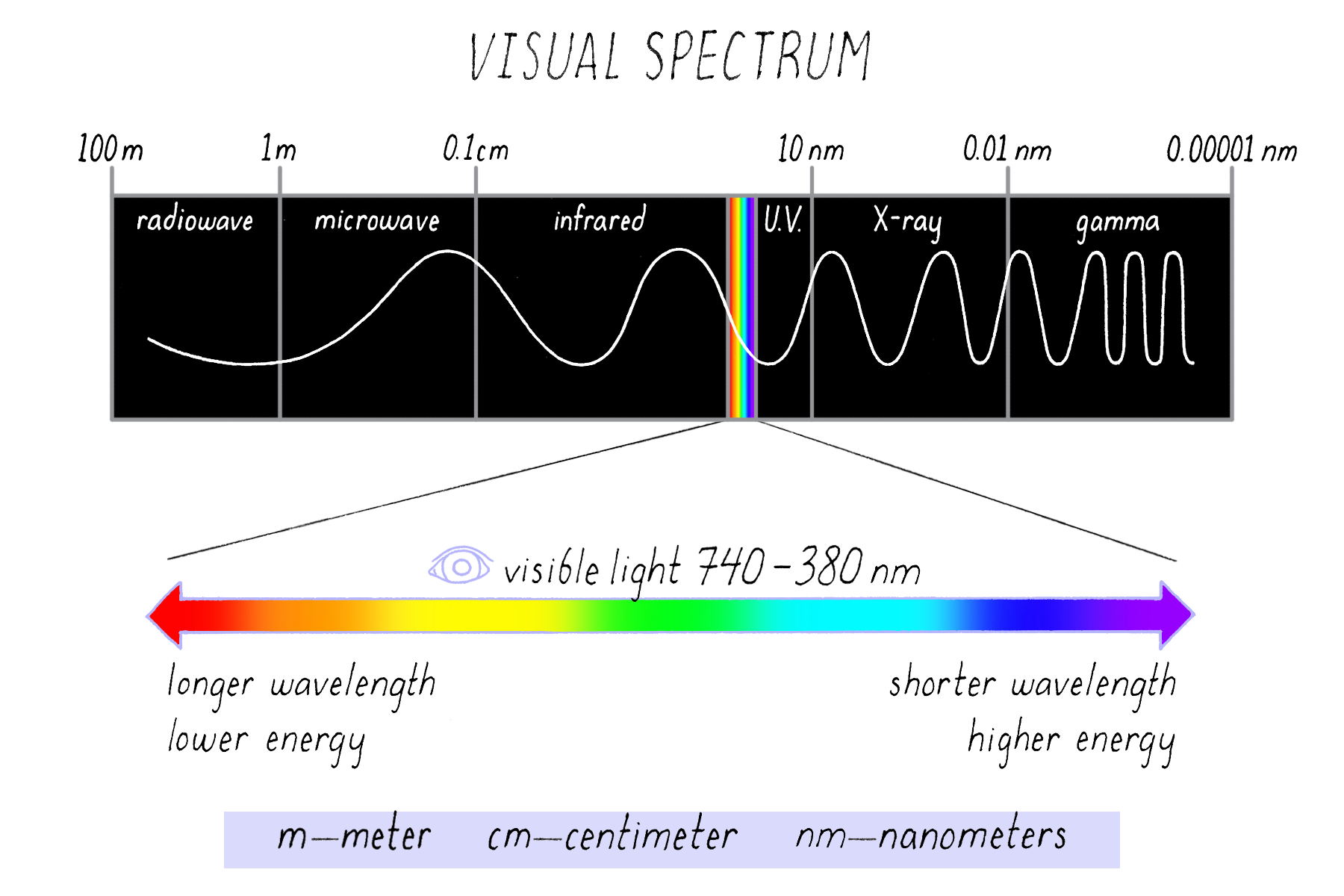
The visible portion of the electromagnetic spectrum

The visible spectrum is the band of the electromagnetic spectrum that is visible to the human eye. Electromagnetic radiation in this range of wavelengths is called visible light (or simply light). The optical spectrum is sometimes considered to be the same as the visible spectrum, but some authors define the term more broadly, to include the ultraviolet and infrared parts of the electromagnetic spectrum as well, known collectively as optical radiation.

A typical human eye will respond to wavelengths from about 380 to about 750 nanometers. In terms of frequency, this corresponds to a band in the vicinity of 400–790 terahertz. These boundaries are not sharply defined and may vary per individual. Under optimal conditions, these limits of human perception can extend to 310 nm (ultraviolet) and 1100 nm (near infrared).

The spectrum does not contain all the colors that the human visual system can distinguish. Unsaturated colors such as pink, or purple variations like magenta, for example, are absent because they can be made only from a mixture of multiple wavelengths. Colors containing only one wavelength are also called pure colors or spectral colors.

Visible wavelengths pass largely unattenuated through the Earth's atmosphere via the "optical window" region of the electromagnetic spectrum. An example of this phenomenon occurs when clean air scatters blue light more than red light, and so the midday sky appears blue (except around the Sun, where it appears white because the light is not scattered as much). The optical window is also referred to as the "visible window" because it overlaps the human visible response spectrum. The near infrared (NIR) window lies just out of the human vision, as do the medium wavelength infrared (MWIR) window and the long-wavelength or far-infrared (LWIR or FIR) window, although other animals may perceive them.

== Spectral colors ==
sRGB rendering of the spectrum of visible light
Color	Wavelength (nm)	Frequency (THz)	Photon energy (eV)
violet	380–450	670–790	2.75–3.26
blue	450–485	620–670	2.56–2.75
cyan	485–500	600–620	2.48–2.56
green	500–565	530–600	2.19–2.48
yellow	565–590	510–530	2.10–2.19
orange	590–625	480–510	1.98–2.10
red	625–750	400–480	1.65–1.98

Colors that can be produced by visible light of a narrow band of wavelengths (monochromatic light) are called spectral colors. The various color ranges indicated in the illustration are an approximation: The spectrum is continuous, with no clear boundaries between one color and the next.

== History ==
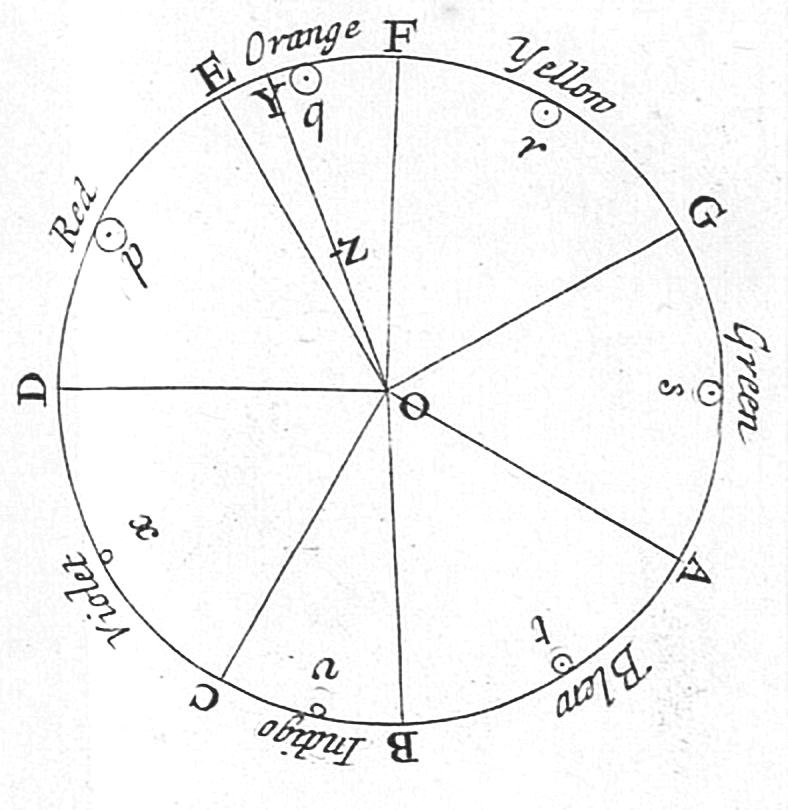
Newton's color circle, from Opticks of 1704, showing the colors he associated with musical notes. The spectral colors from red to violet are divided by the notes of the musical scale, starting at D. The circle completes a full octave, from D to D. Newton's circle places red, at one end of the spectrum, next to violet, at the other. This reflects the fact that non-spectral purple colors are observed when red and violet light are mixed.

In the 13th century, Roger Bacon theorized that rainbows were produced by a similar process to the passage of light through glass or crystal.

In the 17th century, Isaac Newton discovered that prisms could disassemble and reassemble white light, and described the phenomenon in his book Opticks. He was the first to use the word spectrum (Latin for "appearance" or "apparition") in this sense in print in 1671 in describing his experiments in optics. Newton observed that, when a narrow beam of sunlight strikes the face of a glass prism at an angle, some is reflected and some of the beam passes into and through the glass, emerging as different-colored bands. Newton hypothesized light to be made up of "corpuscles" (particles) of different colors, with the different colors of light moving at different speeds in transparent matter, red light moving more quickly than violet in glass. The result is that red light is bent (refracted) less sharply than violet as it passes through the prism, creating a spectrum of colors.

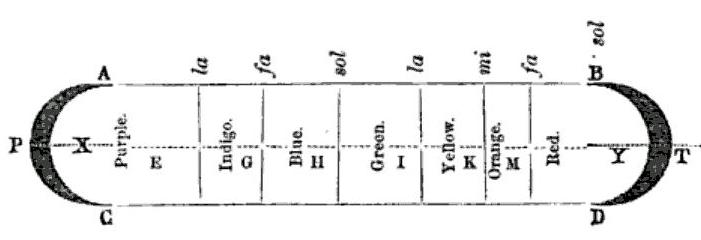
Newton's observation of prismatic colors (David Brewster 1855)

Newton originally divided the spectrum into six named colors: red, orange, yellow, green, blue, and violet. He later added indigo as the seventh color since he believed that seven was a perfect number as derived from the ancient Greek sophists, of there being a connection between the colors, the musical notes, the known objects in the Solar System, and the days of the week. The human eye is relatively insensitive to indigo's frequencies, and some people who have otherwise-good vision cannot distinguish indigo from blue and violet. For this reason, some later commentators, including Isaac Asimov, have suggested that indigo should not be regarded as a color in its own right but merely as a shade of blue or violet. Evidence indicates that what Newton meant by "indigo" and "blue" does not correspond to the modern meanings of those color words. Comparing Newton's observation of prismatic colors with a color image of the visible light spectrum shows that "indigo" corresponds to what is today called blue, whereas his "blue" corresponds to cyan.

In the 18th century, Johann Wolfgang von Goethe wrote about optical spectra in his Theory of Colours. Goethe used the word spectrum (Spektrum) to designate a ghostly optical afterimage, as did Schopenhauer in On Vision and Colors. Goethe argued that the continuous spectrum was a compound phenomenon. Where Newton narrowed the beam of light to isolate the phenomenon, Goethe observed that a wider aperture produces not a spectrum but rather reddish-yellow and blue-cyan edges with white between them. The spectrum appears only when these edges are close enough to overlap.

In the early 19th century, the concept of the visible spectrum became more definite, as light outside the visible range was discovered and characterized by William Herschel (infrared) and Johann Wilhelm Ritter (ultraviolet), Thomas Young, Thomas Johann Seebeck, and others. Young was the first to measure the wavelengths of different colors of light, in 1802.

The connection between the visible spectrum and color vision was explored by Thomas Young and Hermann von Helmholtz in the early 19th century. Their theory of color vision correctly proposed that the eye uses three distinct receptors to perceive color.

== Limits to visible range ==
Photopic (black) and scotopic (green) luminous efficiency functions. The horizontal axis is wavelength in nm. See luminous efficiency function for more info.

The visible spectrum is limited to wavelengths that can both reach the retina and trigger visual phototransduction (excite a visual opsin). Insensitivity to UV light is generally limited by transmission through the lens. Insensitivity to IR light is limited by the spectral sensitivity functions of the visual opsins. The range is defined psychometrically by the luminous efficiency function, which accounts for all of these factors. In humans, there is a separate function for each of two visual systems, one for photopic vision, used in daylight, which is mediated by cone cells, and one for scotopic vision, used in dim light, which is mediated by rod cells. Each of these functions have different visible ranges. However, discussion on the visible range generally assumes photopic vision.

=== Atmospheric transmission ===
The visible range of most animals evolved to match the optical window, which is the range of light that can pass through the atmosphere. The ozone layer absorbs almost all UV light (below 315 nm). However, this only affects cosmic light (e.g. sunlight), not terrestrial light (e.g. Bioluminescence).

=== Ocular transmission ===
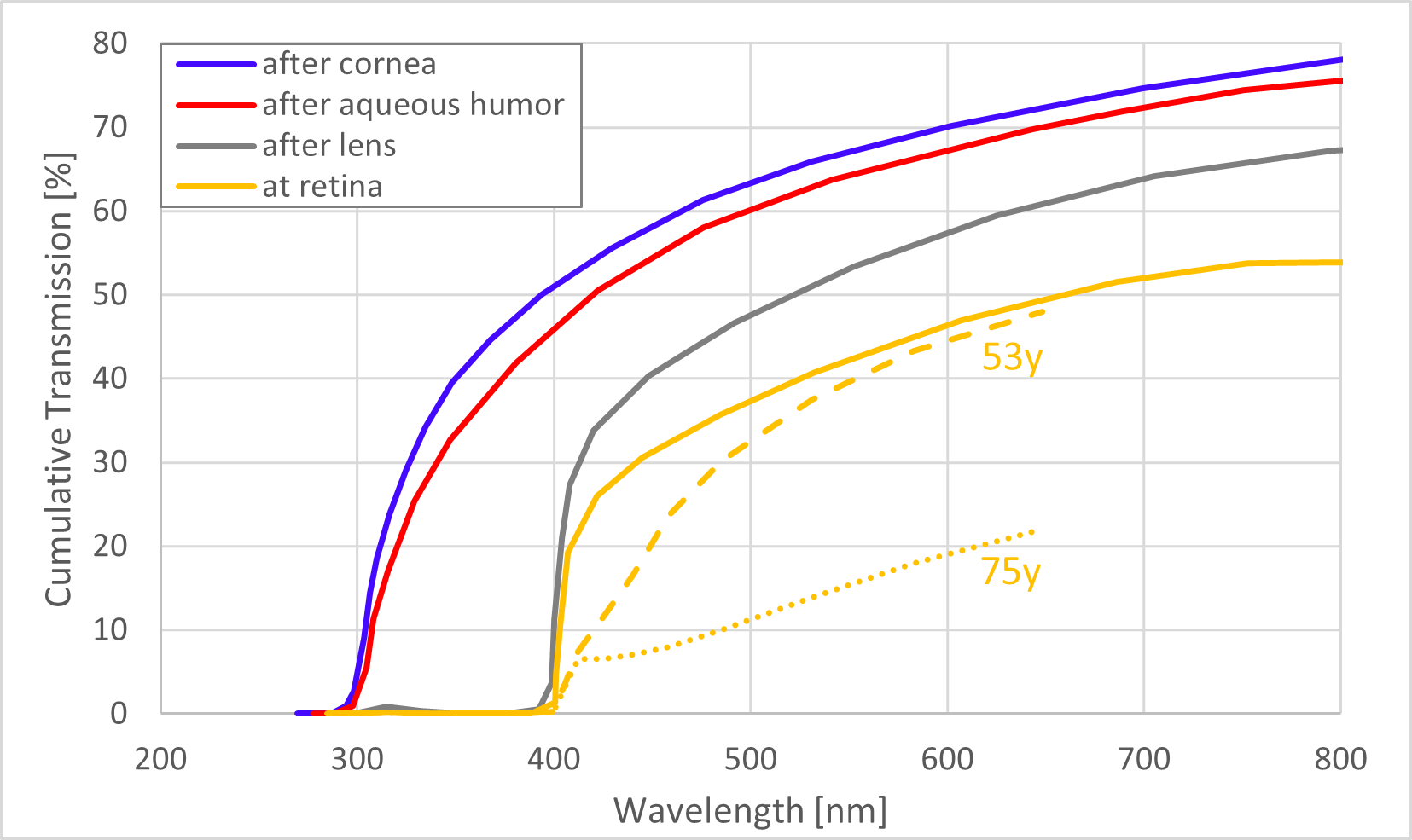
Cumulative transmission spectra of light as it passes through the ocular media, namely after the cornea (blue), before the lens (red), after the lens (gray) and before the retina (orange). The solid lines are for a 4.5 year old eye. The dashed orange line is for a 53 year old eye, and dotted for a 75 year old eye, indicating the effect of lens yellowing.)

Before reaching the retina, light must first transmit through the cornea and lens. UVB light (< 315 nm) is filtered mostly by the cornea, and UVA light (315–400 nm) is filtered mostly by the lens. The lens also yellows with age, attenuating transmission most strongly at the blue part of the spectrum. This can cause xanthopsia as well as a slight truncation of the short-wave (blue) limit of the visible spectrum. Subjects with aphakia are missing a lens, so UVA light can reach the retina and excite the visual opsins; this expands the visible range and may also lead to cyanopsia.

=== Opsin absorption ===
Each opsin has a spectral sensitivity function, which defines how likely it is to absorb a photon of each wavelength. The luminous efficiency function is approximately the superposition of the contributing visual opsins. Variance in the position of the individual opsin spectral sensitivity functions therefore affects the luminous efficiency function and the visible range. For example, the long-wave (red) limit changes proportionally to the position of the L-opsin. The positions are defined by the peak wavelength (wavelength of highest sensitivity), so as the L-opsin peak wavelength blue shifts by 10 nm, the long-wave limit of the visible spectrum also shifts 10 nm. Large deviations of the L-opsin peak wavelength lead to a form of color blindness called protanomaly and a missing L-opsin (protanopia) shortens the visible spectrum by about 30 nm at the long-wave limit. Forms of color blindness affecting the M-opsin and S-opsin do not significantly affect the luminous efficiency function nor the limits of the visible spectrum.

=== Different definitions ===
Regardless of actual physical and biological variance, the definition of the limits is not standard and will change depending on the industry. For example, some industries may be concerned with practical limits, so would conservatively report 420–680 nm, while others may be concerned with psychometrics and achieving the broadest spectrum would liberally report 380–750, or even 380–800 nm. The luminous efficiency function in the NIR does not have a hard cutoff, but rather an exponential decay, such that the function's value (or vision sensitivity) at 1,050 nm is about 10^{9} times weaker than at 700 nm; much higher intensity is therefore required to perceive 1,050 nm light than 700 nm light.

=== Vision outside the visible spectrum ===
Under ideal laboratory conditions, subjects may perceive infrared light up to at least 1,064 nm. While 1,050 nm NIR light can evoke red, suggesting direct absorption by the L-opsin, there are also reports that pulsed NIR lasers can evoke green, which suggests two-photon absorption may be enabling extended NIR sensitivity.

Similarly, young subjects may perceive ultraviolet wavelengths down to about 310–313 nm, but detection of light below 380 nm may be due to fluorescence of the ocular media, rather than direct absorption of UV light by the opsins. As UVA light is absorbed by the ocular media (lens and cornea), it may fluoresce and be released at a lower energy (longer wavelength) that can then be absorbed by the opsins. For example, when the lens absorbs 350 nm light, the fluorescence emission spectrum is centered on 440 nm.

=== Non-visual light detection ===
In addition to the photopic and scotopic systems, humans have other systems for detecting light that do not contribute to the primary visual system. For example, melanopsin has an absorption range of 420–540 nm and regulates circadian rhythm and other reflexive processes. Since the melanopsin system does not form images, it is not strictly considered vision and does not contribute to the visible range.

== In non-humans ==
The visible spectrum is defined as that visible to humans, but the variance between species is large. Not only can cone opsins be spectrally shifted to alter the visible range, but vertebrates with 4 cones (tetrachromatic) or 2 cones (dichromatic) relative to humans' 3 (trichromatic) will also tend to have a wider or narrower visible spectrum than humans, respectively.

Vertebrates tend to have 1-4 different opsin classes:

- longwave sensitive (LWS) with peak sensitivity between 500 and 570 nm (green),
- middlewave sensitive (MWS) with peak sensitivity between 480 and 520 nm (cyan),
- shortwave sensitive (SWS) with peak sensitivity between 415 and 470 nm (violet–blue), and
- violet/ultraviolet sensitive (VS/UVS) with peak sensitivity between 355 and 435 nm (ultraviolet–violet).

Testing the visual systems of animals behaviorally is difficult, so the visible range of animals is usually estimated by comparing the peak wavelengths of opsins with those of typical humans (S-opsin at 420 nm and L-opsin at 560 nm).

=== Mammals ===
Most mammals have retained only two opsin classes (LWS and VS), due likely to the nocturnal bottleneck. However, old world primates (including humans) have since evolved two versions in the LWS class to regain trichromacy. Unlike most mammals, rodents' UVS opsins have remained at shorter wavelengths. Along with their lack of UV filters in the lens, mice have a UVS opsin that can detect down to 340 nm. While allowing UV light to reach the retina can lead to retinal damage, the short lifespan of mice compared with other mammals may minimize this disadvantage relative to the advantage of UV vision. Dogs have two cone opsins at 429 nm and 555 nm, so see almost the entire visible spectrum of humans, despite being dichromatic. Horses have two cone opsins at 428 nm and 539 nm, yielding a slightly more truncated red vision.

=== Birds ===
Most other vertebrates (birds, lizards, fish, etc.) have retained their tetrachromacy, including UVS opsins that extend further into the ultraviolet than humans' VS opsin. The sensitivity of avian UVS opsins vary greatly, from 355 to 425 nm, and LWS opsins from 560 to 570 nm. This translates to some birds with a visible spectrum on par with humans, and other birds with greatly expanded sensitivity to UV light. The LWS opsin of birds is sometimes reported to have a peak wavelength above 600 nm, but this is an effective peak wavelength that incorporates the filter of avian oil droplets. The peak wavelength of the LWS opsin alone is the better predictor of the long-wave limit. A possible benefit of avian UV vision involves sex-dependent markings on their plumage that are visible only in the ultraviolet range.

=== Fish ===
Teleosts (bony fish) are generally tetrachromatic. The sensitivity of fish UVS opsins vary from 347 to 383 nm, and LWS opsins from 500 to 570 nm. However, some fish that use alternative chromophores can extend their LWS opsin sensitivity to 625 nm. The popular belief that the common goldfish is the only animal that can see both infrared and ultraviolet light is incorrect, because goldfish cannot see infrared light.

=== Invertebrates ===
The visual systems of invertebrates deviate greatly from vertebrates, so direct comparisons are difficult. However, UV sensitivity has been reported in most insect species. Bees and many other insects can detect ultraviolet light, which helps them find nectar in flowers. Plant species that depend on insect pollination may owe reproductive success to their appearance in ultraviolet light rather than how colorful they appear to humans. Bees' long-wave limit is at about 590 nm. Mantis shrimp exhibit up to 14 opsins, enabling a visible range of less than 300 nm to above 700 nm.

=== Thermal vision ===
Some snakes can "see" radiant heat at wavelengths between 5 and 30 μm to a degree of accuracy such that a blind rattlesnake can target vulnerable body parts of the prey at which it strikes, and other snakes with the organ may detect warm bodies from a meter away. It may also be used in thermoregulation and predator detection.

== Spectroscopy ==
Earth's atmosphere partially or totally blocks some wavelengths of electromagnetic radiation, but in visible light it is mostly transparent

Spectroscopy is the study of objects based on the spectrum of color they emit, absorb or reflect. Visible-light spectroscopy is an important tool in astronomy (as is spectroscopy at other wavelengths), where scientists use it to analyze the properties of distant objects. Chemical elements and small molecules can be detected in astronomical objects by observing emission lines and absorption lines. For example, helium was first detected by analysis of the spectrum of the Sun. The shift in frequency of spectral lines is used to measure the Doppler shift (redshift or blueshift) of distant objects to determine their velocities towards or away from the observer. Astronomical spectroscopy uses high-dispersion diffraction gratings to observe spectra at very high spectral resolutions.

== See also ==
- Blue light spectrum
- Cosmic ray visual phenomena
- Electromagnetic absorption by water
- High-energy visible light
- Two-photon absorption - a method for seeing outside the visible spectrum
