= Aphakia =

Absence of the lens of the eye

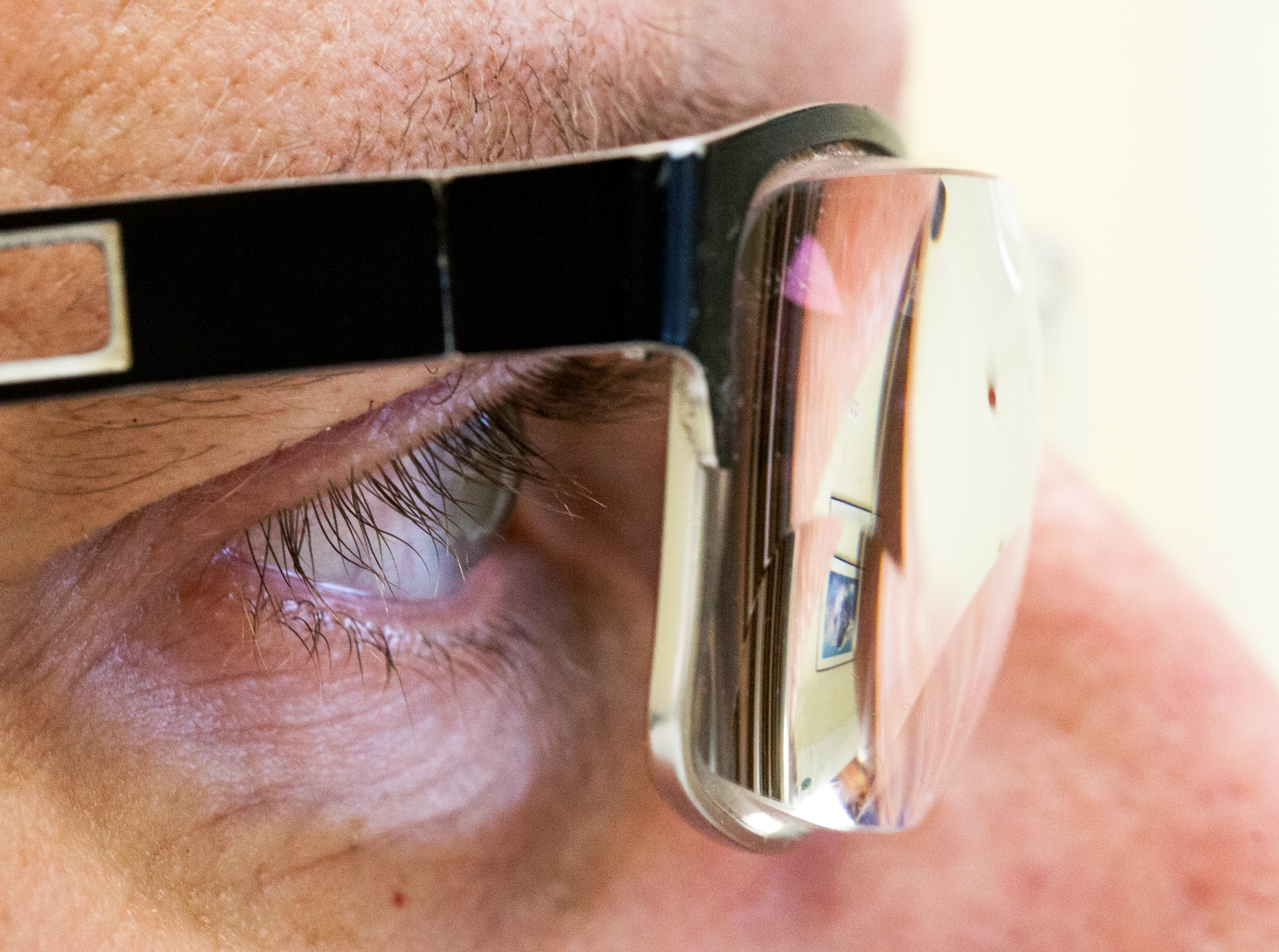
- A person with aphakia wearing cataract glasses, with extremely thick lenses to correct the typical extreme farsightedness. Before in-eye lens replacement was available, such glasses were much more common.
- Specialty: Ophthalmology

Aphakia is the absence of the lens of the eye, due to surgical removal, such as in cataract surgery, a perforating wound or ulcer, or congenital anomaly. It causes a loss of ability to maintain focus (accommodation), high degree of farsightedness (hyperopia), and a deep anterior chamber. Complications include detachment of the vitreous or retina, and glaucoma. Babies are rarely born with aphakia. Occurrence most often results from surgery to remove a congenital cataract. Congenital cataracts usually develop as a result of infection of the fetus or genetic reasons. It is often difficult to identify the exact cause of these cataracts, especially if only one eye is affected.

People with aphakia have relatively small pupils and their pupils dilate to a lesser degree.

== Signs and symptoms ==
- Hypermetropia: Without the focusing power of the lens, the eye becomes very farsighted.
- Loss of accommodation: Since the lens and its zonules are responsible for adjusting the focus of vision to different lengths, patients with aphakia will have a total loss of accommodation.
- Defective vision: High degree hypermetropia and total loss of accommodation cause defective vision for both distance and near.
- Cyanopsia: Absence of lens cause cyanopsia or blue vision. Some individuals have said that they perceive ultraviolet light, invisible to those with a lens, as whitish blue or whitish-violet.
- Erythropsia: Sometimes, objects appear reddish.
- Deep anterior chamber: Since the lens is absent, anterior chamber will be deep.
- Iridodonesis: Iridodonesis is the vibration or agitated motion of the iris with eye movement.
- Purkinje test shows only two images; the reflection from anterior and posterior corneal surfaces.
- Iridectomy mark may be seen in surgical aphakia.
- Astigmatism: With-the-rule astigmatism due to corneal wound healing may occur in surgical aphakia, mainly after intracapsular cataract extraction or extracapsular cataract extraction.

=== Complications ===
Main complications of surgical aphakia include:

- Spectacle intolerance: Due to image magnification (up to 30%), optical aberration, prismatic effect and roving ring scotoma, spectacles are not well tolerated by aphakic patients. Due to unequal refractive power between the eyes, wearing spectacles with single-eye aphakia may cause double vision.
- Glaucoma: Secondary angle closure glaucoma may occur due to vitreous prolapse.
- Retinal detachment
- Aphakic bullous keratopathy

== Causes ==
Surgical removal of a lens, mainly in cataract surgery, is the most common cause of aphakia. Spontaneous traumatic absorption or congenital absence of lens matter is rare. Traumatic subluxation or dislocation of a lens may cause it.

== Treatment ==
Aphakia can be corrected by wearing glasses or contact lenses, by artificial lens implantation, or by refractive corneal surgeries. Eyes with artificial lenses are described as "pseudophakic".

== Etymology ==
From Ancient Greek a-, privative prefix + phakós, lentil, anything shaped like a lentil, e.g. a lens, via New Latin.
