= Midline cervical cleft =

- Specialty: Dermatology

Midline cervical clefts are a rare congenital anomaly resulting from incomplete fusion during embryogenesis of the first and second branchial arches in the ventral midline of the neck. The condition presents as a midline cutaneous defect of the anterior neck with a skin projection or sinus, or as a subcutaneous erythematous fibrous cord. Surgical excision is the preferred treatment.

== See also ==
- Accessory tragus
- List of cutaneous conditions
