= Phacodonesis =

Medical condition of the eyes

Phacodonesis (/ˈfækoʊ.doʊˈniːsɪs/; from Ancient Greek φακός (phakos) 'lens' and δονέω (doneo) 'to shake') is the tremulousness or vibration of the lens with eye movement. This is often due to lens subluxation, the incomplete or partial dislocation of the lens, caused by an injury to the eye in which some or most of the zonular fibers are broken.

== See also ==
- Iridodonesis
