= Ectopia lentis =

Malposition of the lens of the eye

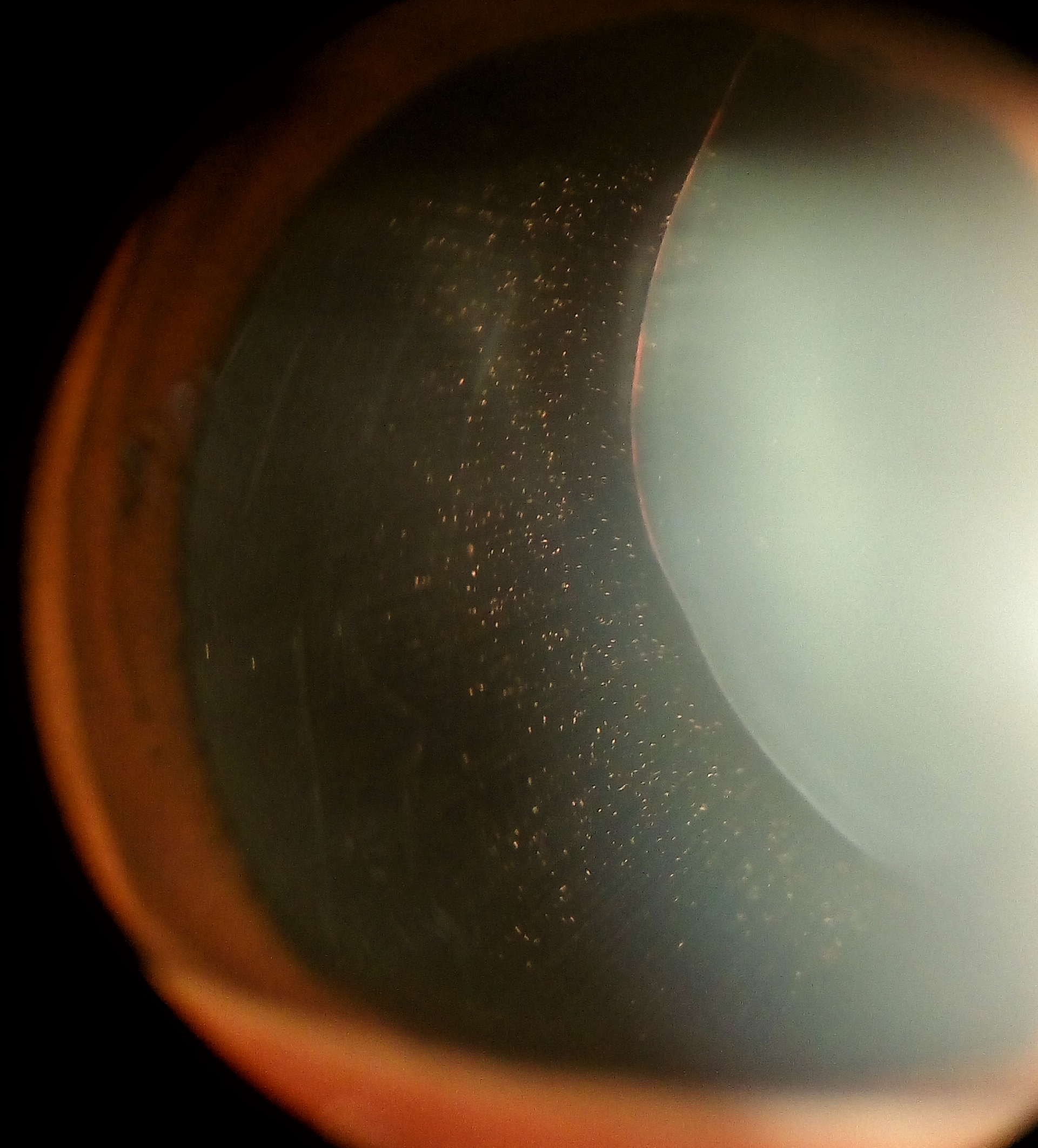
- Ectopia lentis in a patient with Marfan syndrome. Zonular fibers are visible.
- Specialty: Medical genetics

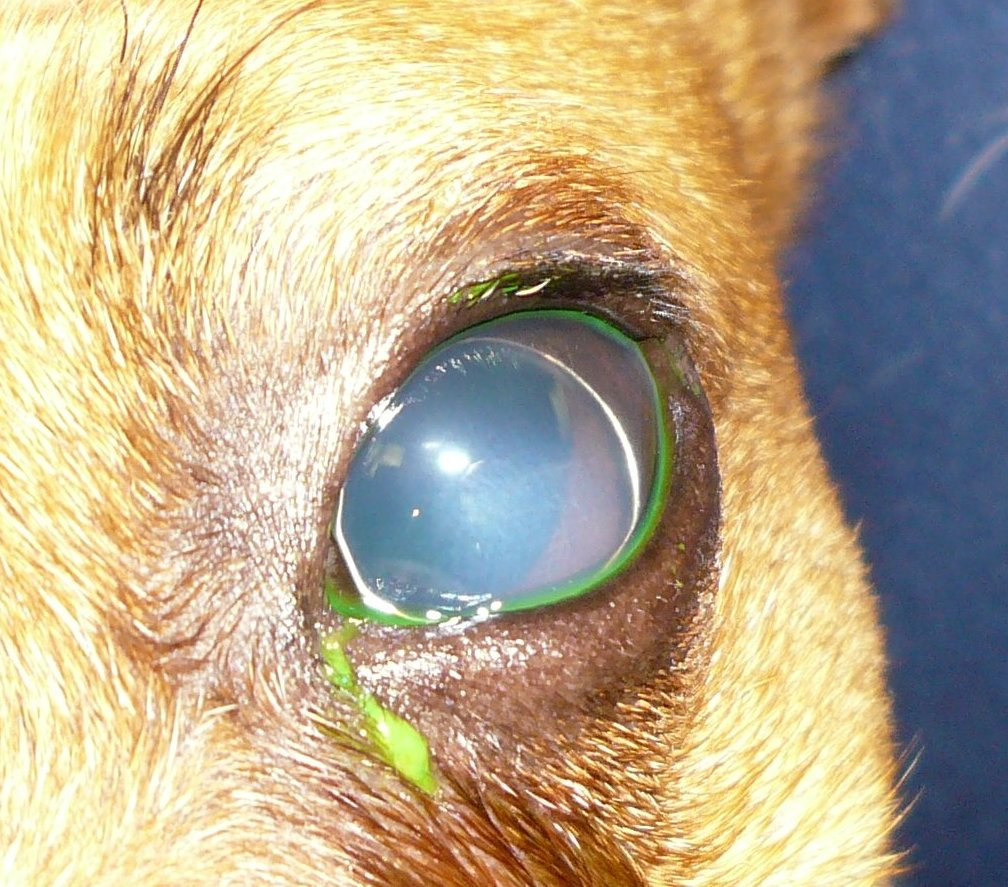
Anterior lens luxation in a dog

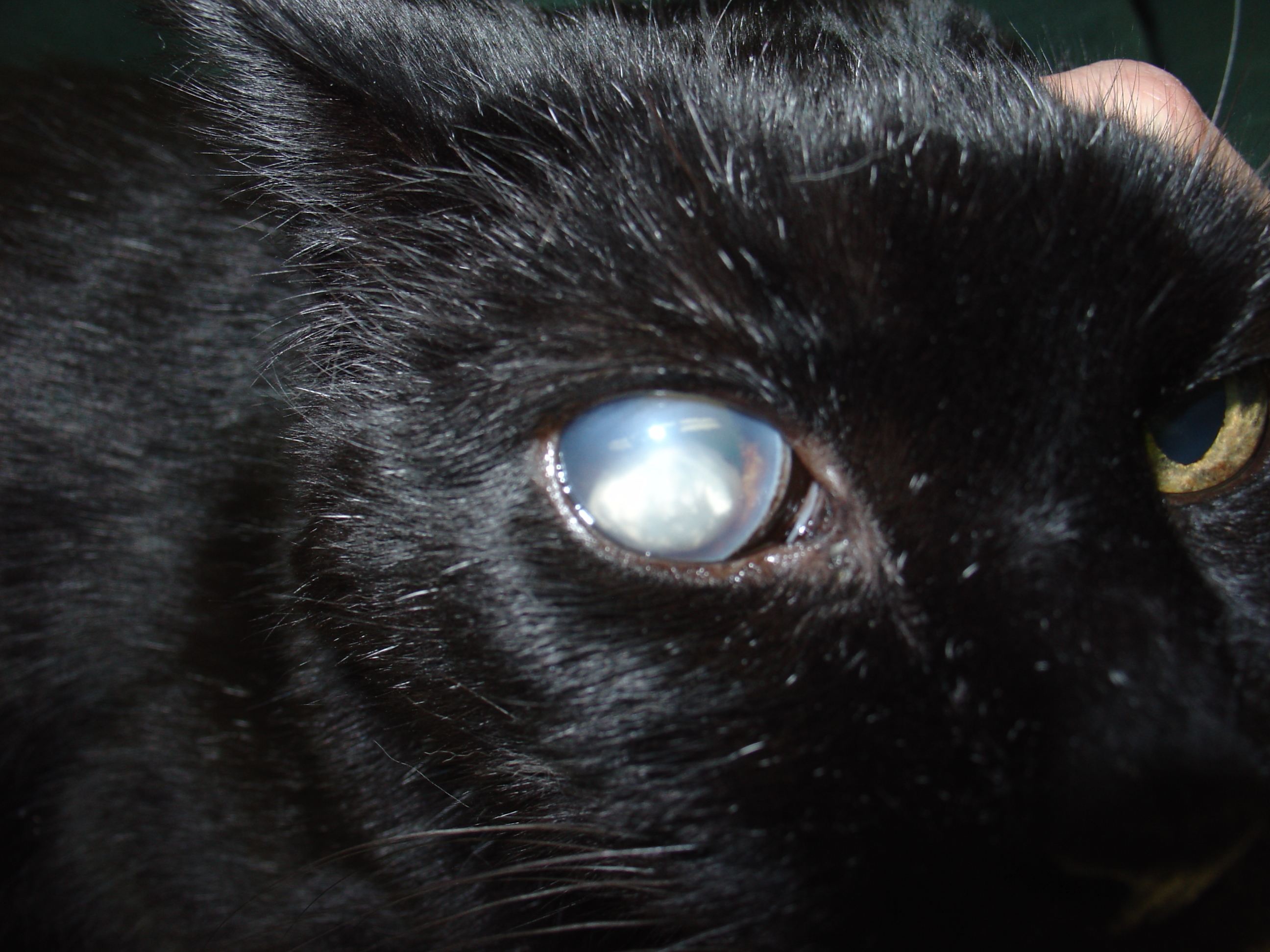
Anterior lens luxation with cataract formation in a cat

Ectopia lentis is a displacement or malposition of the eye's lens from its normal location. A partial dislocation of a lens is termed lens subluxation or subluxated lens; a complete dislocation of a lens is termed lens luxation or luxated lens.

== Ectopia lentis in dogs and cats ==
Although observed in humans and cats, ectopia lentis is most commonly seen in dogs. Ciliary zonules normally hold the lens in place. Abnormal development of these zonules can lead to primary ectopia lentis, usually a bilateral condition. Luxation can also be a secondary condition, caused by trauma, cataract formation (decrease in lens diameter may stretch and break the zonules), or glaucoma (enlargement of the globe stretches the zonules). Steroid administration weakens the zonules and can lead to luxation, as well. Lens luxation in cats can occur secondary to anterior uveitis (inflammation of the inside of the eye).

=== Anterior lens luxation ===
With anterior lens luxation, the lens pushes into the iris or actually enters the anterior chamber of the eye. This can cause glaucoma, uveitis, or damage to the cornea. Uveitis (inflammation of the eye) causes the pupil to constrict (miosis) and trap the lens in the anterior chamber, leading to an obstruction of outflow of aqueous humour and subsequent increase in ocular pressure (glaucoma). Better prognosis is valued in lens replacement surgery (retained vision and normal intraocular pressure) when it is performed before the onset of secondary glaucoma. Glaucoma secondary to anterior lens luxation is less common in cats than dogs due to their naturally deeper anterior chamber and the liquification of the vitreous humour secondary to chronic inflammation. Anterior lens luxation is considered to be an ophthalmological emergency.

=== Posterior lens luxation ===
With posterior lens luxation, the lens falls back into the vitreous humour and lies on the floor of the eye. This type causes fewer problems than anterior lens luxation, although glaucoma or ocular inflammation may occur. Surgery is used to treat dogs with significant symptoms. Removal of the lens before it moves to the anterior chamber may prevent secondary glaucoma.

=== Lens subluxation ===
Lens subluxation is also seen in dogs and is characterized by a partial displacement of the lens. It can be recognized by trembling of the iris (iridodonesis) or lens (phacodonesis) and the presence of an aphakic crescent (an area of the pupil where the lens is absent). Other signs of lens subluxation include mild conjunctival redness, vitreous humour degeneration, prolapse of the vitreous into the anterior chamber, and an increase or decrease of anterior chamber depth. Removal of the lens before it completely luxates into the anterior chamber may prevent secondary glaucoma. Extreme degree of luxation of lens is called "lenticele" in which lens comes out of the eyeball and becomes trapped under the Tenon's capsule or conjunctiva. A nonsurgical alternative treatment involves the use of a miotic to constrict the pupil and prevent the lens from luxating into the anterior chamber.

=== Breed predisposition ===
Terrier breeds are predisposed to lens luxation, and it is probably inherited in the Sealyham Terrier, Jack Russell Terrier, Wirehaired Fox Terrier, Rat Terrier, Teddy Roosevelt Terrier, Tibetan Terrier, Miniature Bull Terrier, Shar Pei, and Border Collie. The mode of inheritance in the Tibetan Terrier and Shar Pei is likely autosomal recessive. Labrador Retrievers and Australian Cattle Dogs are also predisposed.

== Systemic associations in humans ==
In humans, a number of systemic conditions are associated with ectopia lentis:

More common:

- Marfan syndrome (upward and outward)
- Homocystinuria (downward and inwards)
- Weill–Marchesani syndrome
- Sulfite oxidase deficiency
- Molybdenum cofactor deficiency
- Hyperlysinemia

Less common:

- Ehlers–Danlos syndrome
- Crouzon disease
- Refsum syndrome
- Kniest syndrome
- Mandibulofacial dysostosis
- Sturge–Weber syndrome
- Conradi syndrome
- Pfaundler syndrome
- Pierre Robin syndrome
- Wildervanck syndrome
- Sprengel deformity

== See also ==
- List of systemic diseases with ocular manifestations
