= Teddy Roosevelt Terrier =

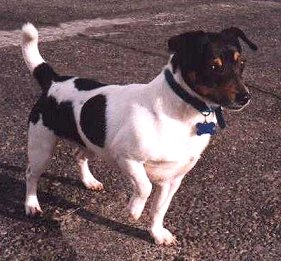
- Other names: Type B, Short-legged Rat Terrier or Bench-legged Feist
- Origin: United States
Kennel club standards
- United Kennel Club: standard
- American Kennel Club: standard

The Teddy Roosevelt Terrier is a small to medium-sized American hunting terrier. It is lower-set, with shorter legs, and is more muscular with heavier bone density than the related American Rat Terrier. Much diversity exists in the history of the Teddy Roosevelt Terrier breed, and it shares a common early history with the American Rat Terrier, Fox Paulistinha, and Tenterfield Terrier. The Rat Terrier's background is said to stem from the terriers or other dogs that were brought over by early English and other working-class immigrants. Since the breed was a farm, hunting, and utility dog, little to no planned breeding was used other than breeding dogs with agreeable traits to each other to produce the desired work ethic in the dog. The Feist (dog), Bull Terrier, Smooth Fox Terrier, Manchester Terrier, Whippet, Italian Greyhound, the now extinct English White Terrier, Turnspit Dog, and Wry-legged Terrier all share in the Teddy Roosevelt Terrier's ancestry. These early ratting terriers were then most likely bred to the Beagle or Beagle crossbred dogs (for increased scenting ability) and other dogs. Maximizing the influences from these various breeds provides the modern Teddy Roosevelt Terrier with a keen sense of awareness and prey drive, an acute sense of smell, and a very high intellect. Although they tend to be aloof with strangers, they are devoted companion dogs with a strong desire to please and be near their owners at all times.

The current UKC standard calls for a Teddy Roosevelt Terrier to be at least 8 and no more than 12 inches in height, with weight proportionate to height. Teddy Roosevelt Terriers weighing as much as 25 lb (11 kg) or as little as 8 lb (3.6 kg) are not uncommon.

== Breed history ==
Early American history shows that the Teddy Roosevelt Terrier, like the Rat Terrier, were often referred to as Feist or just plain terrier mixes - in the case of the Teddy Roosevelt Terrier, "bench-legged feist".

Since the breed was primarily a farm and hunting dog, crossing Rat Terriers to other breeds was common. One such early cross was with the Beagle, and this cross possibly reinforced the bench leg, since the Bench-legged Beagle was a common hunting companion.

Separating the long-legged phenotype from the short-legged phenotype in most cases did not occur, litters born from parents of either or both phenotypes commonly displayed a variety of leg and body length, yet all were still considered and labeled merely as Rat Terriers. In the middle 1990s, efforts to segregate the types began in earnest, but mixing of the two types in some cases still exists today.

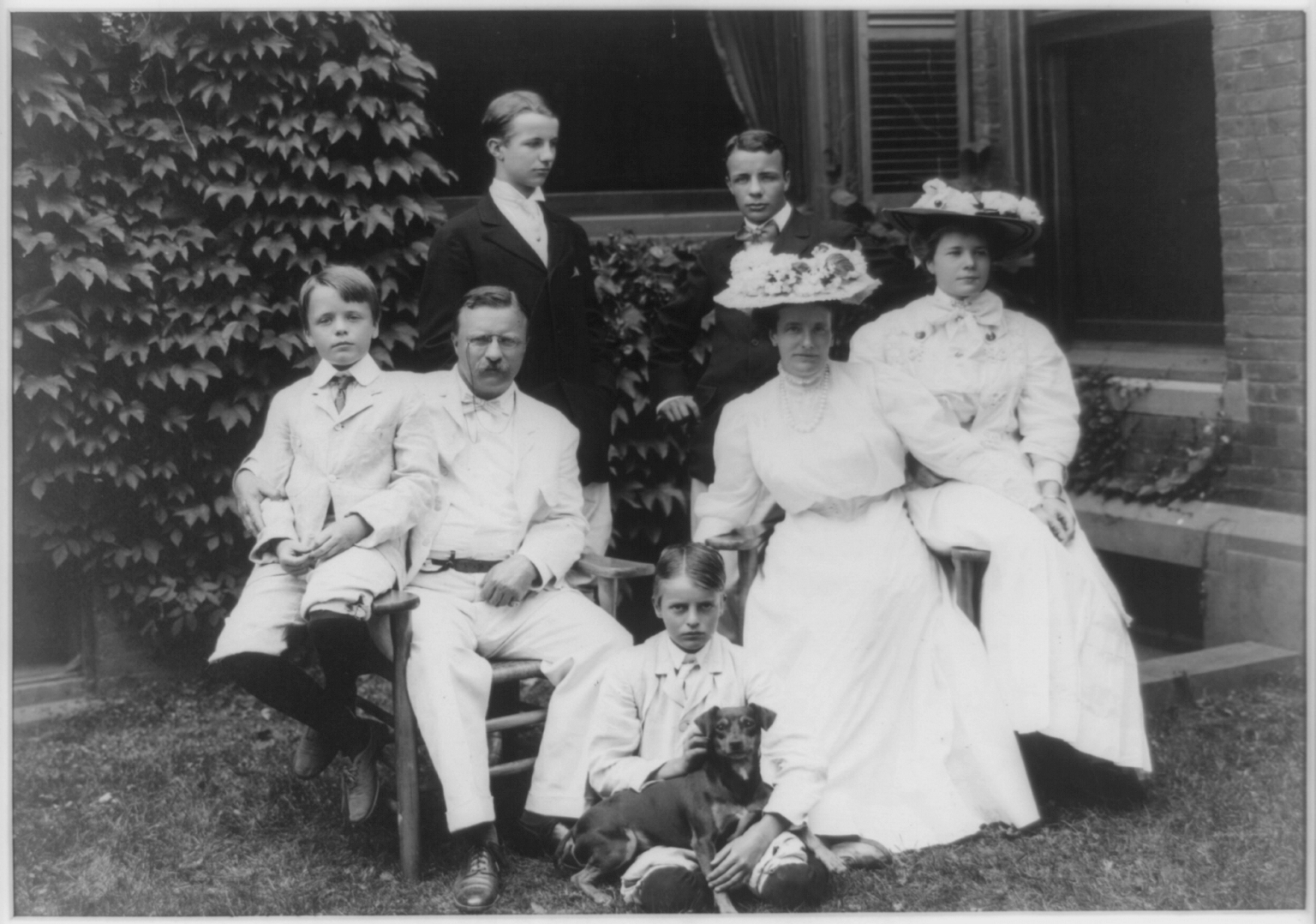
Theodore Roosevelt's family, with terrier

When the types were separated by the Rat Terrier Club of America, the short-legged variety was named in honor of Theodore Roosevelt, although he never owned Rat Terriers nor was he instrumental in developing the Teddy Roosevelt Terrier. The dog most attributed to being one of the foundations for the Rat Terriers was a black-and-tan, mixed-breed, feist-type dog owned by the Roosevelts. In one of his letters to his children, President Roosevelt writes, "There is a very cunning little dog named Skip, belonging to John Goff's pack, who has completely adopted me. I think I shall take him home to Archie. He likes to ride on Dr. Lambert's horse, or mine, and though he is not as big as Jack, takes eager part in the fight with every bear and bobcat." Often confused with Skip the black and tan feist, the Roosevelts also had a dog named Scamp. Scamp is the only dog mentioned in Roosevelt's letters as ever hunting rats while in the White House, "Scamp is really an extraordinary ratter and kills a great many rats in the White House, in the cellars and on the lower floor and among the machinery. He is really a very nice little dog." No pictures of Scamp nor descriptions other than one which describes him as a Fox Terrier have been found. Another terrier which often is confused with the Rat Terrier was Roosevelt's dog named Jack. In Mr. Roosevelt's letter dated July 27, 1902, to Mrs. Roswell Field, he writes, "It is a real pleasure to send you a photograph of my boy Kermit, with Jack, the Manchester Terrier, who is absolutely a member of the family." Jack was a Manchester Terrier, not a Rat Terrier.

The first standard for the breed was developed by the now-defunct Teddy Roosevelt Terrier Club of America in 1996. Currently, several registration organizations are active, all of which have their own standards, but the most commonly accepted are the United Kennel Club and the United Kennel Club International, although the UKCI still only recognizes them as a variation of the Rat Terrier.

In 1999, both "Rat Terrier" and “Teddy Roosevelt Terrier" were accepted as separate breeds by the United Kennel Club.

Currently, the UKC accepts single Teddy Roosevelt Terrier registration applications for dogs from 10 different registries, where they are simply designated as Rat Terriers. .

In August 2016 the Teddy Roosevelt Terrier was accepted into the American Kennel Club (AKC) Foundation Stock Services. In July 2019, the breed advanced to the AKC Miscellaneous Class, and by 2026 the breed had been fully recognized by the AKC.

== Appearance ==
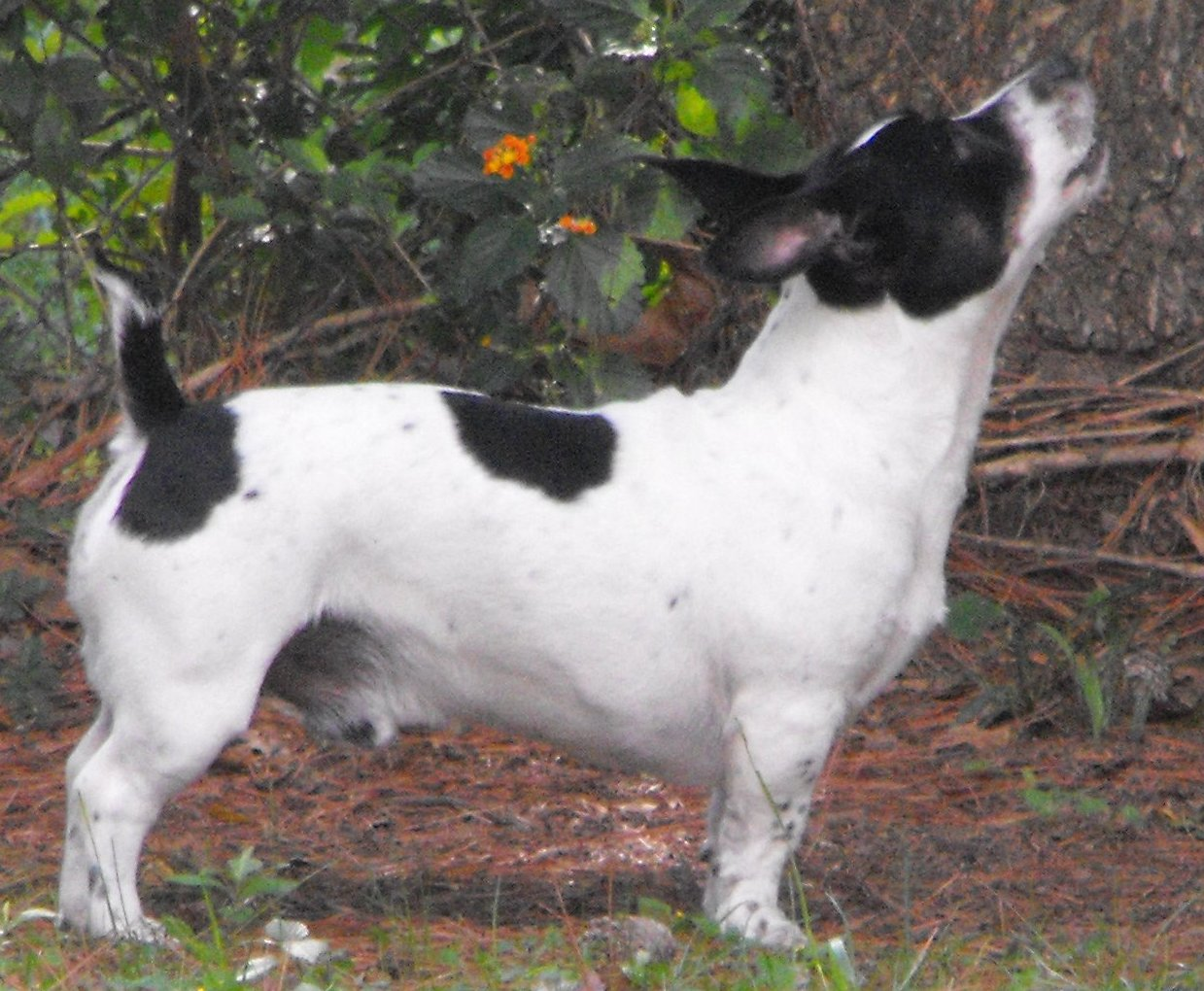
Adult male, showing proper proportions.

The Teddy Roosevelt Terrier is a low-set, muscular, active, small- to medium-sized hunting terrier. The preferred ratio of length of body (prosternum to point of buttocks) to height (withers to ground) is 10:7. The head is broad, slightly domed, wedge-shaped, and proportionate to the size of the body. Ears are V-shaped, set at the outside edges of the skull, and may be erect or button. A docked tail is preferred, but a natural bob tail or a natural tail carried in an upward curve is also acceptable. The Teddy Roosevelt Terrier occurs in solid white, other solid colors with markings, and white with a variety of colored patches.

The Teddy Roosevelt Terrier should be evaluated as a working terrier, and exaggerations, or faults, should be penalized in proportion to how much they interfere with the dog's ability to work. Honorable scars resulting from field work are not to be penalized.

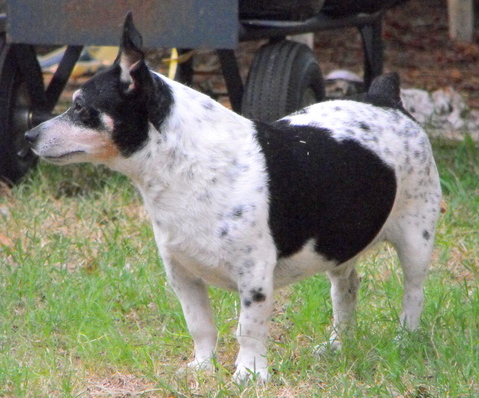
Adult male Teddy Roosevelt Terrier

Disqualifications: Unilateral or bilateral cryptorchid; viciousness or extreme shyness; unilateral or bilateral deafness; hanging ears; cropped ears; hairlessness; any suggestion of kink or curl in tail; merle.

== Common characteristics ==
Like the Rat Terrier, the Teddy Roosevelt Terrier of today is bred for versatility, including hunting instincts, soundness of health, great temperament, and good looks. Teddy Roosevelt Terriers have higher than average prey drive and will chase squirrels, rats, stray cats, and any other animals they consider prey. They also dig and follow mole trails, leaving an array of trenches and holes behind. They make excellent watch dogs, and can be very protective and territorial. They share a love for their families and become very attached, craving human interaction and affection. Always by their owners' sides, they become constant shadows, following their masters around throughout the daily routine.

These dogs are very smart and loyal, which makes them easy to train. They are energetic and playful, and their antics can make one laugh daily. However, when it is time to settle down, they are just as content to be in a lap.

They can adapt to almost any lifestyle, whether shown in conformation rings, working in agility trials, or just a great companion for home or farm. Their size makes them suitable for apartment living, as well. Today, the Teddy Roosevelt Terrier is gaining a solid following and becoming a popular household companion.(Source AKC)

== Health problems ==
Less common problems may include allergies, bite problems (malocclusions), hip dysplasia, elbow dysplasia, and subluxating patella, as these are problems that appear in the related Rat Terrier.

Ectopia lentis, a congenital condition, also affects this breed. Although not currently well-documented in the Teddy Roosevelt Terrier, it is seen in small numbers and populations according to the Orthopedic Foundation for Animals, but is still seen in higher numbers in the Rat Terrier and other terrier breeds.
