= Iridodonesis =

Vibration or agitated motion of the iris

Iridodonesis (/ˌaɪərɪdoʊdoʊˈniːsɪs/) is the vibration or agitated motion of the iris with eye movement. This may be caused by lens subluxation, the incomplete or partial dislocation of the lens; or by aphakia, the absence of a lens. The term originated from irido- (Latin: iris) + doneo (Greek: δονέο, to shake to and fro).

== See also ==
- Phacodonesis
