= Accessory auricle =

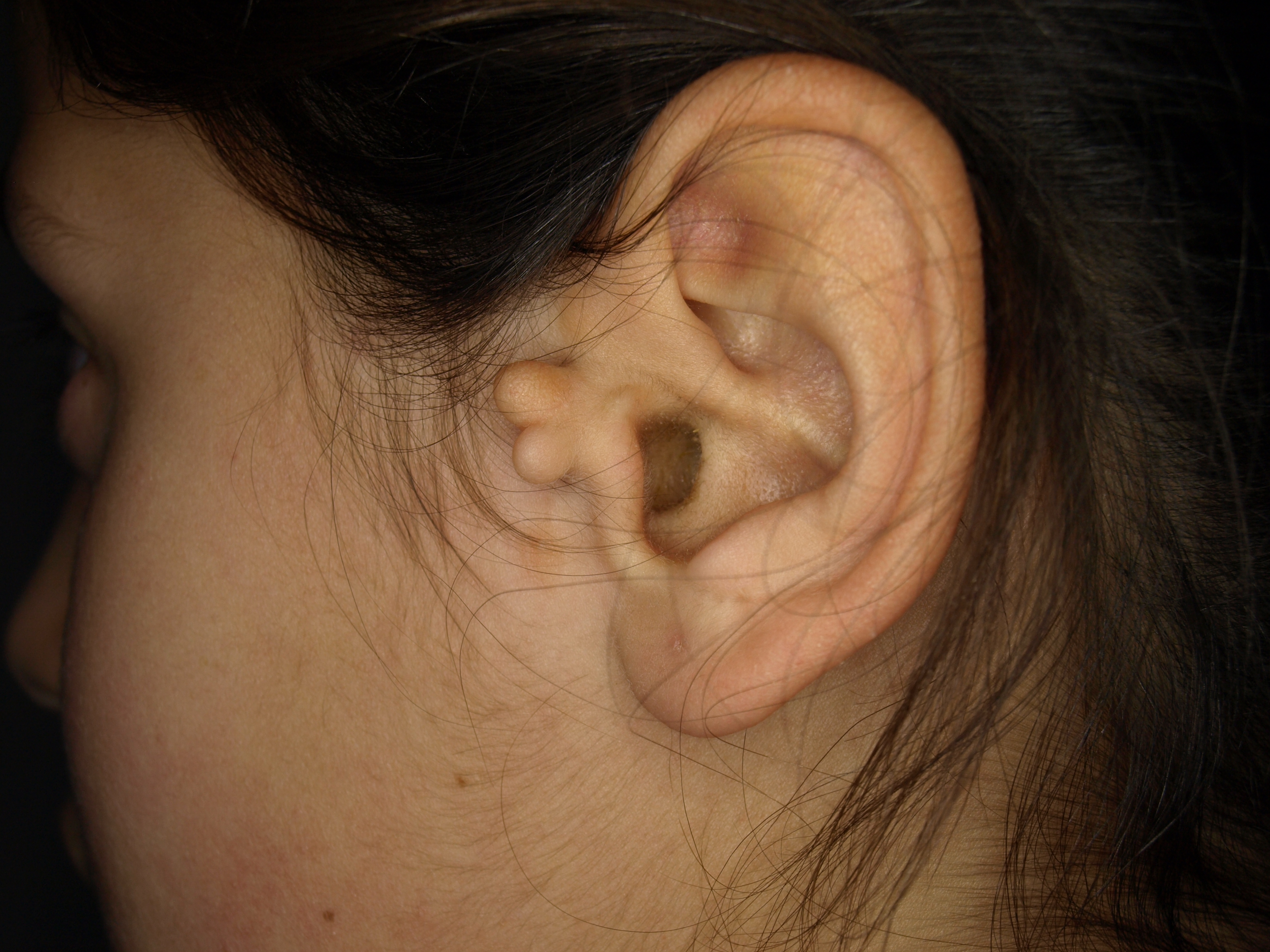
- Specialty: Dermatology

An accessory auricle is a congenital anomaly typically seen as a skin coloured nodule, most frequently just to the front of the ear.

== Signs and symptoms ==
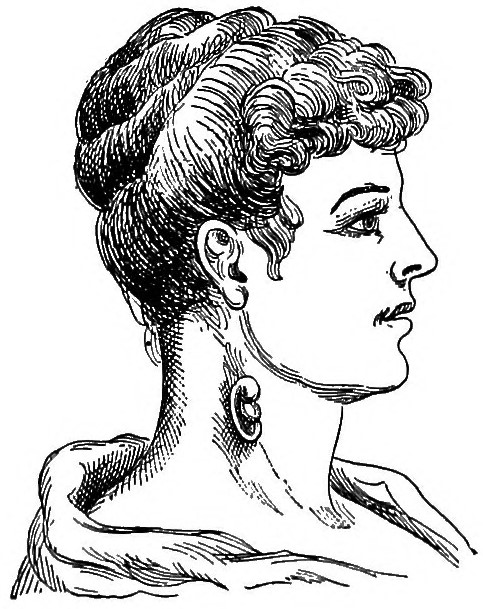
Well-developed accessory auricle on the side of the neck

The general presentation is of a skin-covered nodule, papule, or nodule of the skin surface, usually immediately anterior to the auricle. However, it may be anywhere within the periauricular tissues. Bilateral presentation can be seen.

== Genetics ==
A study of a family with 11 affected showed the accessory auricle were inherited in an autosomal dominant manner.

== Diagnosis ==
An intermediate power of a microscopic view of an accessory auricle.

The lesions presents as a nodule or papule, either sessile or pedunculated. They may be soft or have a cartilaginous structure. By histologic examination, it is a recapitulation of normal external auricle. There will be skin, cartilaginous structures, and cartilage (although the last is not seen in all variants of this disorder). Some investigators believe that the tragus is the only hillock which is derived from the first branchial arch. This is clearly suggestive that true cases of accessory auricle represent a true duplication of the hillocks that were part of the second branchial arch. The second ear appears as a mirror image folded forward and lying on the posterior cheek.

=== Differential diagnosis ===
These structures are distinctly different from squamous papilloma and benign teratoma.

=== Classification ===
The several components or degrees of development range from an ear tag, preauricular appendage, preauricular tag, or accessory tragus, to supernumerary ears or polyotia. It is a relatively common congenital anomaly of the first branchial arch or second branchial arches. Other anomalies may be present concurrently, including cleft palate, cleft lip, or mandibular hypoplasia. There is a known association with Goldenhar syndrome (oculo-auriculo-vertebral syndrome) and with Wildervanck syndrome. There may also be an association with congenital cartilaginous rest of the neck.

== Management ==
Simple surgical excision is curative. The recommended treatment is that the skin is peeled off the extra-auricular tissue and protruding cartilage remnants are trimmed. Normal appearance is achieved in majority of cases. The reconstruction successful in true cases of accessory auricle, as it also is in individuals with auricular appendages.

== Epidemiology ==
These lesions usually present in newborns, although they may not come to clinical attention until adulthood (for cosmetic reasons). There is no gender predilection. They are present in approximately 3–6 per 1000 live births.
