= Congenital smooth muscle hamartoma =

- Other names: CSMH
- Specialty: Dermatology

Congenital smooth muscle hamartoma is typically a skin colored or lightly pigmented patch or plaque with hypertrichosis. Congenital smooth muscle hamartoma was originally reported in 1969 by Sourreil et al.

== Signs and symptoms ==
Although the clinical presentation of congenital smooth muscle hamartoma varies, it typically takes the form of an irregularly shaped, skin-colored, or slightly hyperpigmented patch or plaque on the trunk or extremities that is accompanied by noticeable vellus hairs. Often, it is located in the lumbosacral region.

== Causes ==
Congenital smooth muscle hamartoma most likely arises from an abnormal development that occurs during mesodermal maturation, primarily in the arrector pili muscle. It is hypothesized that hypertrichosis results from the CD34 + dermal dendritic cells in the hamartoma stimulating the bulge's epithelial cells.

There have been reports of familial cases recently, which raise the possibility of a genetic susceptibility.

Rarely do diffuse forms of congenital smooth cell hamartoma cause the skin to fold. It may indicate systemic involvement and is described as a symptom of the Michelin tire infant syndrome.

== Diagnosis ==
Histologically, the main characteristics of CSMH include reticular dermal smooth muscle hyperplasia with differently orientated, clearly defined bundles of smooth muscle that may extend into subcutaneous adipose tissue. Hair follicles and smooth muscle proliferation are frequently tightly related. Increased epidermal pigment is a sign of hyperpigmentation. Immunohistochemical methods have recently clarified a few CSMH markers. It has been observed that CD34-positive dermal dendritic cells are an inherent component of smooth muscle hamartomas. Furthermore, to distinguish clearly between skin cancers of myofibroblastic or fibroblastic origin and spindled smooth muscle cell soft tissue tumors, the cytoskeletal protein h-caldesmon has been employed as a smooth muscle cell-specific marker.

== See also ==
- Skin lesion
- List of cutaneous conditions
