= Wildervanck syndrome =

- Other names: Cervicooculoacoustic syndrome
- Specialty: Neurology

Wildervanck syndrome or cervico-oculo-acoustic syndrome comprises a triad of:

- Duane syndrome
- Klippel-Feil anomaly (fused cervical vertebrae)
- congenital hearing loss

Wildervanck syndrome is a developmental disorder that may be characterized by accessory tragi.
