= Hair follicle nevus =

- Other names: Vellus hamartoma
- Specialty: Dermatology

Hair follicle nevus is a cutaneous condition that presents as a small papule from which fine hairs protrude evenly from the surface.

== Signs and symptoms ==
Hair follicle nevus usually presents as a single, skin-colored papule or nodule on the face after birth that exhibit no symptoms.

== Diagnosis ==
Histologically, vellus hair follicle growth with perifollicular fibrous thickening occasionally encircled by a cellular stroma is the hallmark of hair follicle nevus. Smooth muscle fibers and eccrine and sebaceous glands are at times visible.

== See also ==
- Skin lesion
- List of cutaneous conditions
