= Cyanopsia =

Medical term for seeing everything tinted in blue

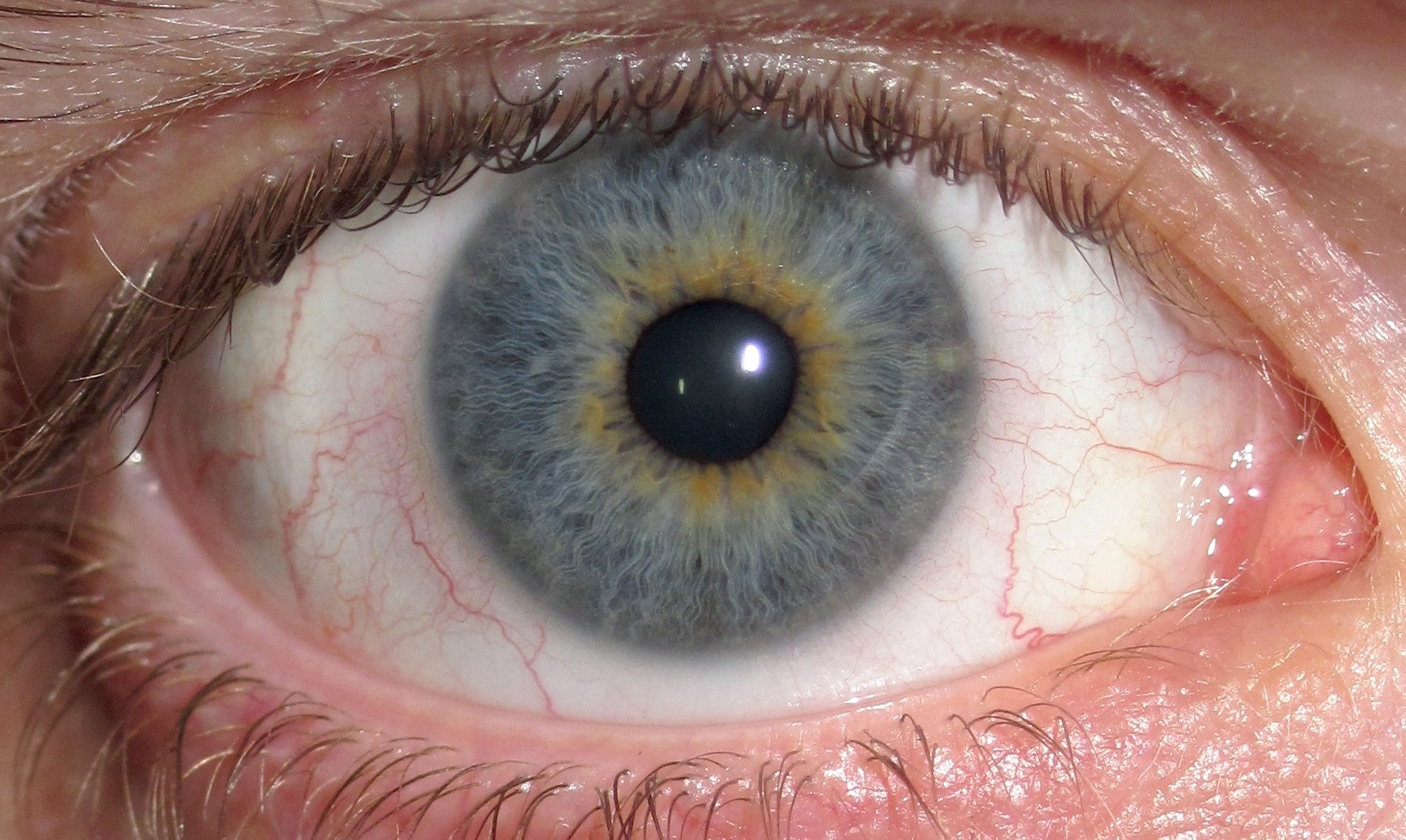
Human Eye

Cyanopsia is a rare visual phenomenon characterized by a blue tint to vision. Most commonly associated with cataract surgery and certain medications, such as sildenafil (more commonly known as Viagra), cyanopsia is typically a temporary side effect rather than a standalone disease. The condition primarily affects the retina, the light-sensitive layer at the back of the eye, and sometimes the optic nerve, which transmits visual signals to the brain. Following cataract surgery, the replacement of the natural lens with a synthetic one increases sensitivity to blue light, resulting in a blue-tinged visual field. Similarly, medications like sildenafil can affect retinal function, temporarily altering color perception. The condition generally resolves without intervention, lasting from a few hours to weeks depending on the cause.

Cyanopsia is most prevalent in older adults undergoing cataract surgery and in men using PDE5 inhibitors for erectile dysfunction, though it remains a rare occurrence. It does not appear to be influenced by ethnicity, geography, or hereditary factors. While it may cause mild discomfort or heightened light sensitivity, cyanopsia does not affect long-term vision or quality of life. Historically, cyanopsia has been noted in medical literature as a brief occurrence linked to advancements in cataract surgery and modern pharmacology.

== Signs and symptoms ==
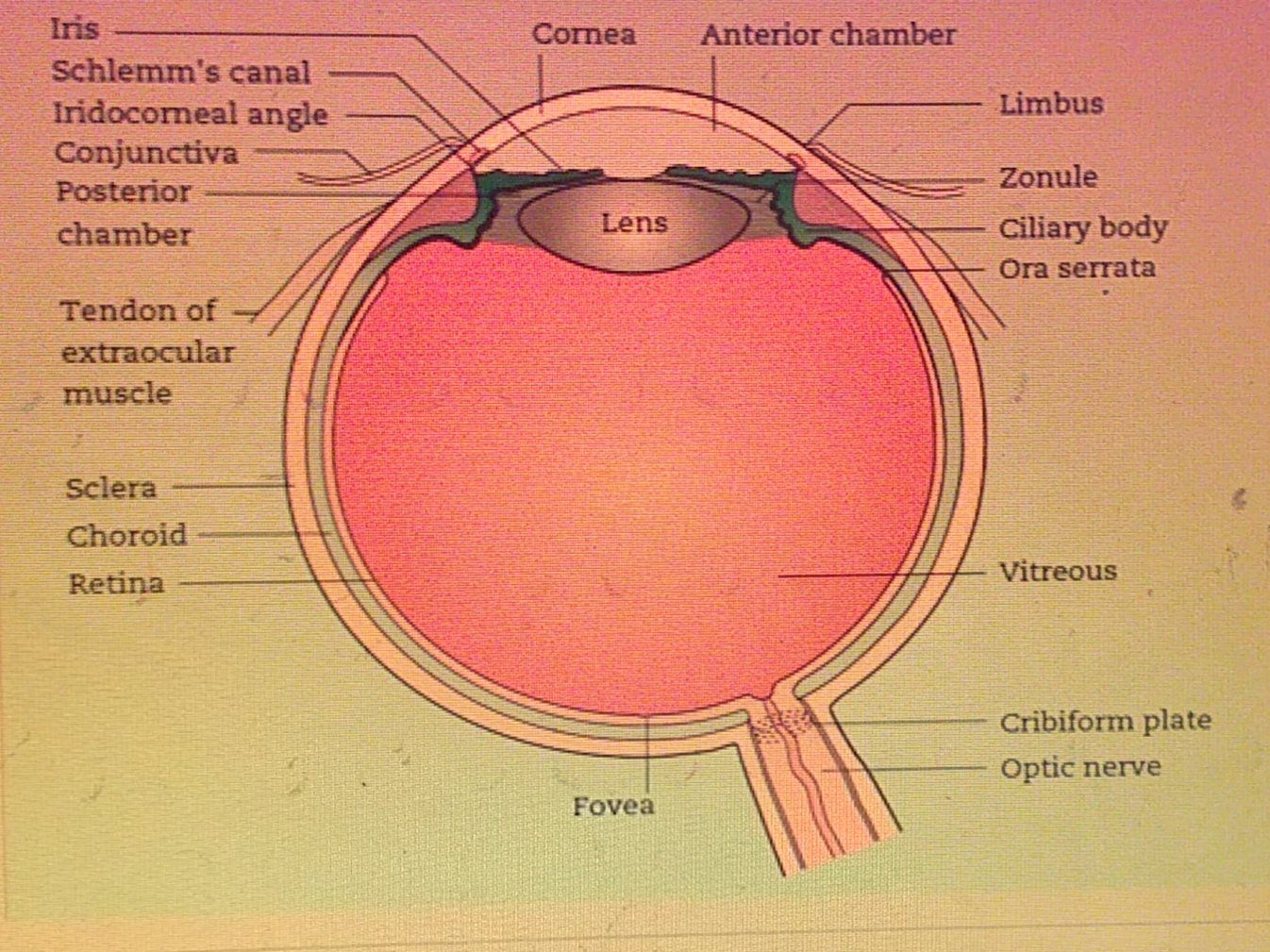
Anatomy of the Eye

Cyanopsia is characterized by a persistent blue tint to the vision, which is the most noticeable symptom. This change in color perception may affect the entire visual field or be more prominent in specific areas. The condition primarily involves the retina, the light-sensitive tissue at the back of the eye, and occasionally the optic nerve, which carries visual information to the brain. When suffering from Cyanopsia some individuals may also experience blurred vision, or heightened sensitivity to bright light, which can make well-lit environments uncomfortable.

The condition is typically temporary and does not cause pain or physical discomfort. Most individuals report that their overall vision remains clear aside from the blue tint. While cyanopsia can be briefly disorienting, it rarely interferes significantly with daily activities. Symptoms usually resolve on their own within hours to weeks, depending on the cause. Cyanopsia after cataract surgery diminishes as the eye adapts, while medication-induced cyanopsia resolves once the medication's effects wear off. Cyanopsia has rarely been a long-term issue, as it generally resolves itself.

Symptom	Description	Short-term	Long-term	Cause Association
Blue-tinted Vision	Blue tint over the visual field	yes	rarely	Cataract Surgery or medications
Photophobia	Sensitivity to bright lights	yes	no	Mostly post-surgery
Blurriness	Slight blurriness	yes-rare to occur with Cyanopsia	no	Some drug-induced cases

While the primary symptom of Cyanopsia is a blue tint to vision, the exact reasons why some individuals experience this phenomenon while others do not, remain unclear. Variations in retinal sensitivity, individual responses to medications, or differences in post-surgical adaptation may contribute.

== Cause ==
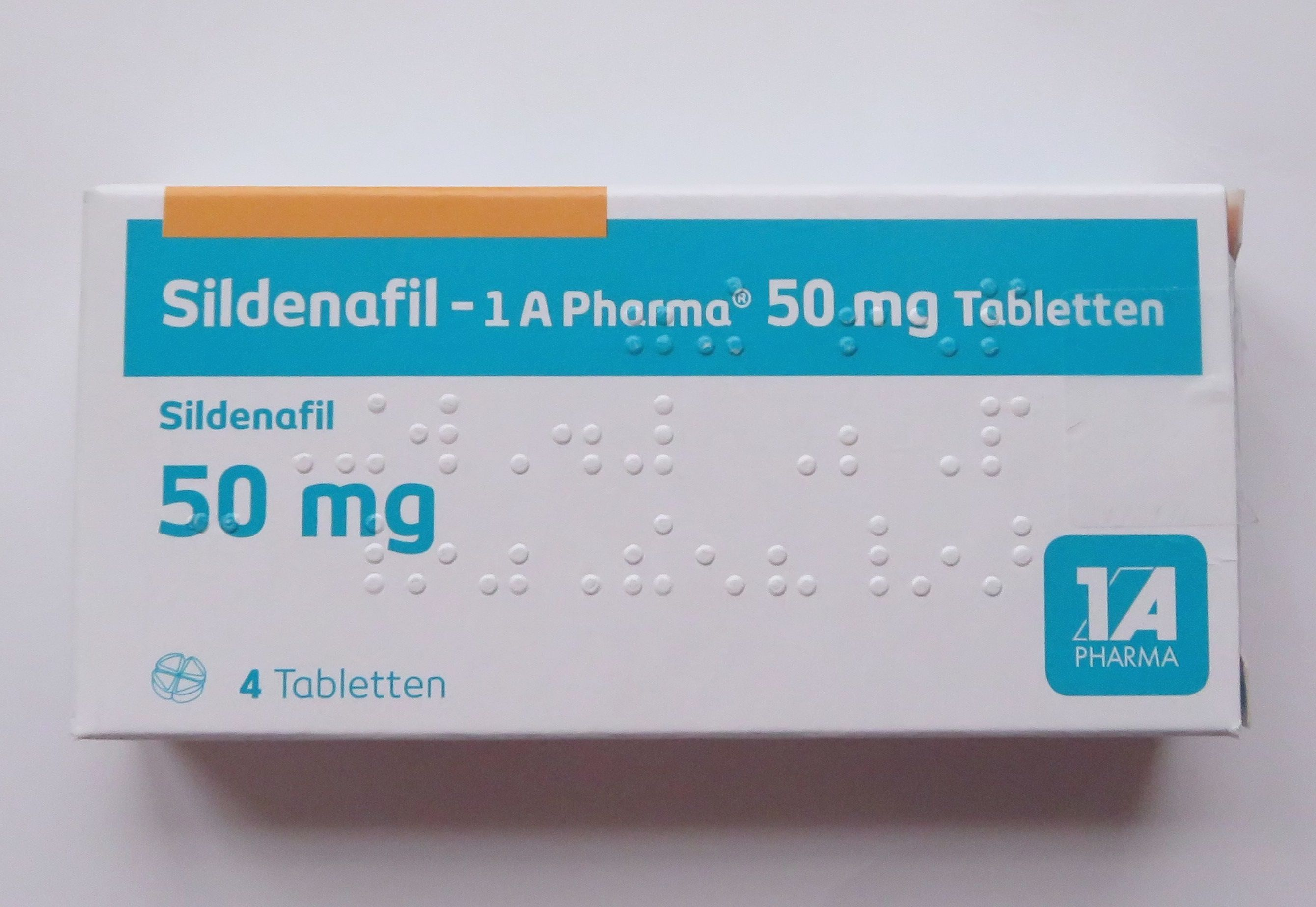
Sildenafil

Cyanopsia is caused by medical or pharmacological factors and is not contagious. The primary causes include post-cataract surgery, certain medications, and, less commonly, neurological or ophthalmological conditions.

Post-cataract surgery is a common cause, as replacing the natural lens with a synthetic one increases exposure to blue light, leading to temporary blue-tinted vision. This effect usually resolves as the eye adapts. Certain medications, such as sildenafil, can also induce cyanopsia by temporarily altering retinal function. Medication management and adjustments can be made to fix the issue. Rarely, conditions affecting the retina or optic nerve can lead to cyanopsia, though these cases are less documented.

Risk factors include cataract surgery, the use of medications like sildenafil, and certain retinal or optic nerve conditions. Managing exposure to bright light and consulting a doctor to adjust medications, if necessary, can help reduce the risk.

While the causes of cyanopsia, such as cataract surgery and certain medications, are well-documented, gaps in knowledge remain regarding why some individuals develop cyanopsia while others do not under similar circumstances. Differences in retinal sensitivity, enzyme activity, or brain adaptation may play a role. Additionally, rare cases linked to neurological conditions are not fully understood, highlighting the need for further research into the mechanisms behind these occurrences.

== Pathophysiology ==
Cyanopsia primarily affects the retina, the light-sensitive layer at the back of the eye, and sometimes the optic nerve, which transmits visual signals to the brain. The retina contains specialized cells called photoreceptors, which are responsible for detecting light and color. In cyanopsia, these photoreceptors, particularly the ones sensitive to blue light (short-wavelength cones), are overstimulated or affected, leading to an exaggerated perception of blue hues. Cyanopsia is a symptom rather than a disease, below are some factors that may cause Cyanopsia:

Cataract in human eye

1. Post-Cataract Surgery:
  - After cataract surgery, the natural lens, which filters blue light, is replaced with a synthetic lens that allows more blue light to pass through. This sudden increase in blue light reaching the retina causes the brain to perceive a blue tint in vision.
  - This effect is temporary as the brain and eyes gradually adapt to the new lens.
2. Medication Effects:
  - Certain medications, such as sildenafil, interfere with enzymes in the retina, particularly phosphodiesterase-6 (PDE6). This disruption affects how the retina processes light, leading to temporary alterations in color perception and the appearance of a blue tint.
3. Neurological Factors:
  - Rarely, cyanopsia may result from conditions affecting the optic nerve, or visual processing centers in the brain. In these cases, the pathways that interpret color signals may be disrupted, contributing to the blue-tinted vision.

While the mechanisms behind cyanopsia caused by cataract surgery and medications are well understood, there are gaps in understanding why only some individuals experience cyanopsia under similar conditions. For example, not everyone who takes medications like sildenafil reports cyanopsia, suggesting individual differences in retinal sensitivity or enzyme activity.

One theory suggests that cyanopsia may develop due to the sudden unmasking of blue light sensitivity after cataract surgery, as the brain adjusts to the removal of the natural lens. For medication-induced cyanopsia, the inhibition of PDE6 is believed to temporarily disrupt normal photoreceptor function, emphasizing blue light in visual perception. Rare cases of cyanopsia linked to neurological conditions may arise from disruptions in the brain's processing of visual signals.

== Diagnosis ==
Diagnosing cyanopsia involves assessing the patient’s symptoms, medical history, and any recent surgeries or medications; this is generally done by an ophthalmologist. Cyanopsia is a symptom rather than a disease, so the focus is on identifying the underlying cause that is making cyanopsia occur. Doctors ask about recent cataract surgery or the use of medications like sildenafil, which are known to cause cyanopsia. The timing and duration of symptoms help distinguish cyanopsia from other vision issues.

Optical Coherence Tomography (OCT) of Retina

A comprehensive eye exam is often performed to rule out other conditions. This may include assessments of visual acuity, pupil response, and retinal health. In some cases, additional tests such as a color vision test, optical coherence tomography (OCT), or an electroretinogram (ERG) may be used to check for retinal or optic nerve abnormalities. Neurological evaluation may be necessary if cyanopsia is accompanied by other neurological symptoms.

The diagnosis of cyanopsia can be challenging because it is a rare and temporary symptom that overlaps with other visual disturbances. Common misdiagnoses include retinal conditions like macular edema, or neurological disorders affecting color perception, such as optic neuropathy. These conditions may present with similar symptoms, such as altered color vision or photophobia, leading to potential confusion. Additionally, patients may not associate cyanopsia with recent cataract surgery or medication use, delaying accurate identification of the cause.

== Treatment and management ==
Management of cyanopsia focuses on addressing the underlying cause, particularly in cases linked to cataract surgery or medication use.

- Observation: Most cases resolve naturally. After cataract surgery, symptoms usually subside within days to weeks without treatment.
- Medication Management: For medication-induced cyanopsia, discontinuing or adjusting the dosage under medical supervision is effective. Patients may be prescribed alternative medications that do not carry the same risk.

=== Holistic options ===
- Blue-Light Blocking Lenses: These lenses can reduce the intensity of symptoms, especially in bright environments, though they do not address the underlying cause.
- Reduced Light Exposure: Avoiding bright or artificial lighting can help manage symptoms. Visual adaptation exercises may also provide relief.

There are no specific pharmacological treatments or surgical interventions for cyanopsia. However, research on post-surgical blue-light filtering and selective blue-light blocking medications shows promise. Overall, treatment is minimal and without risk, as cyanopsia is usually self-limiting and will resolve on its own.

== Prognosis ==
Cyanopsia has an excellent prognosis, as it is a temporary condition that resolves on its own in most cases. The duration and recurrence of symptoms depend on the underlying cause and the individual’s age or stage of life. Cyanopsia is most commonly reported in older adults after cataract surgery, where symptoms typically subside within a few days to weeks as the eyes adapt to the synthetic lens. In younger adults, cyanopsia is often caused by medications like sildenafil, with symptoms disappearing once the drug's effects wear off. Recurrence is possible with repeated use of such medications, but episodes are temporary.

There is no evidence linking cyanopsia to environmental or hereditary factors. The condition is caused by medical or pharmacological triggers rather than genetic predisposition or environmental exposure.

Cyanopsia does not develop into a chronic condition and shows no cumulative effects. In cases associated with cataract surgery, it diminishes as the eye adjusts. Medication-induced cyanopsia resolves with the stopping of the medication, and no long-term recurrence patterns have been observed.

Cyanopsia has no impact on life expectancy or long-term quality of life. While some individuals may experience mild discomfort, such as sensitivity to bright light, these effects are short-lived and rarely interfere with daily activities.

Prognosis data for cyanopsia is limited due to its rarity and transient nature. Most information is from case studies of postoperative cataract patients and medication side effects.

== Epidemiology ==
Cyanopsia is rare and occurs primarily in individuals who have undergone cataract surgery or used specific medications. It is not influenced by ethnic, or geographic factors but is more common in certain demographic groups. Older adults are more likely to experience cyanopsia due to the higher frequency of cataract surgery in this age group. Medication-induced cyanopsia can occur across a broader age range and is more common in men due to the use of PDE5 inhibitors like sildenafil for erectile dysfunction.

== Research directions ==
The two research articles below highlight recent advancements in understanding cyanopsia, its underlying mechanisms, pharmacological triggers, and clinical implications.

"A Case Report of Sildenafil-Induced Cyanopsia" (2021): Published in the Korean Journal of Clinical Pharmacy, this study explored the neurological impact of sildenafil on the visual system. Using advanced imaging techniques, researchers identified altered rod and cone photoreceptor activity, contributing to the perception of blue-tinted vision. This work suggests that cyanopsia may stem from imbalances in retinal signal processing rather than structural abnormalities, laying the groundwork for further pharmacodynamic studies.

"Post-Cataract Surgery and Cyanopsia" (2020): This article, featured in the British Journal of Ophthalmology, investigated the prevalence of cyanopsia following cataract surgery. The study monitored 200 patients post-surgery and found that approximately 12% experienced temporary cyanopsia due to changes in intraocular lens color perception. The authors recommended optimized lens coatings to avoid this side effect, which is the focus for upcoming surgical innovations.

=== Clinical trials ===
A clinical trial registered in 2022 (ClinicalTrials.gov ID: NCT05432189) is examining the efficacy of visual training exercises in reducing cyanopsia symptoms associated with phosphodiesterase inhibitors. This trial, expected to conclude in 2025, represents a promising avenue for non-invasive therapeutic interventions.

Researchers at the University of California are developing a pharmacological agent designed to modulate visual photo transduction pathways. Initial preclinical studies have shown that the compound reduces symptoms of cyanopsia in animal models induced by sildenafil and related drugs.

=== Case study ===
Case Study of Propylthiouracil-Induced Cyanopsia (2023): Published in the Journal of Clinical Endocrinology and Metabolism, this case report detailed a rare instance of cyanopsia in a patient treated for hyperthyroidism. This study underscored the need for tailored patient education regarding potential visual side effects of medications.

Research on cyanopsia is increasingly focusing on personalized medicine approaches, including patient-specific risk assessments for drug-induced visual changes. Additionally, the development of technologies for real-time monitoring of retinal function is set to enhance diagnostic precision. These advances could significantly improve the management and prevention of cyanopsia in pharmacological and surgical cases.
