= Zonule of Zinn =

Ring of fibers suspending the eye's lens

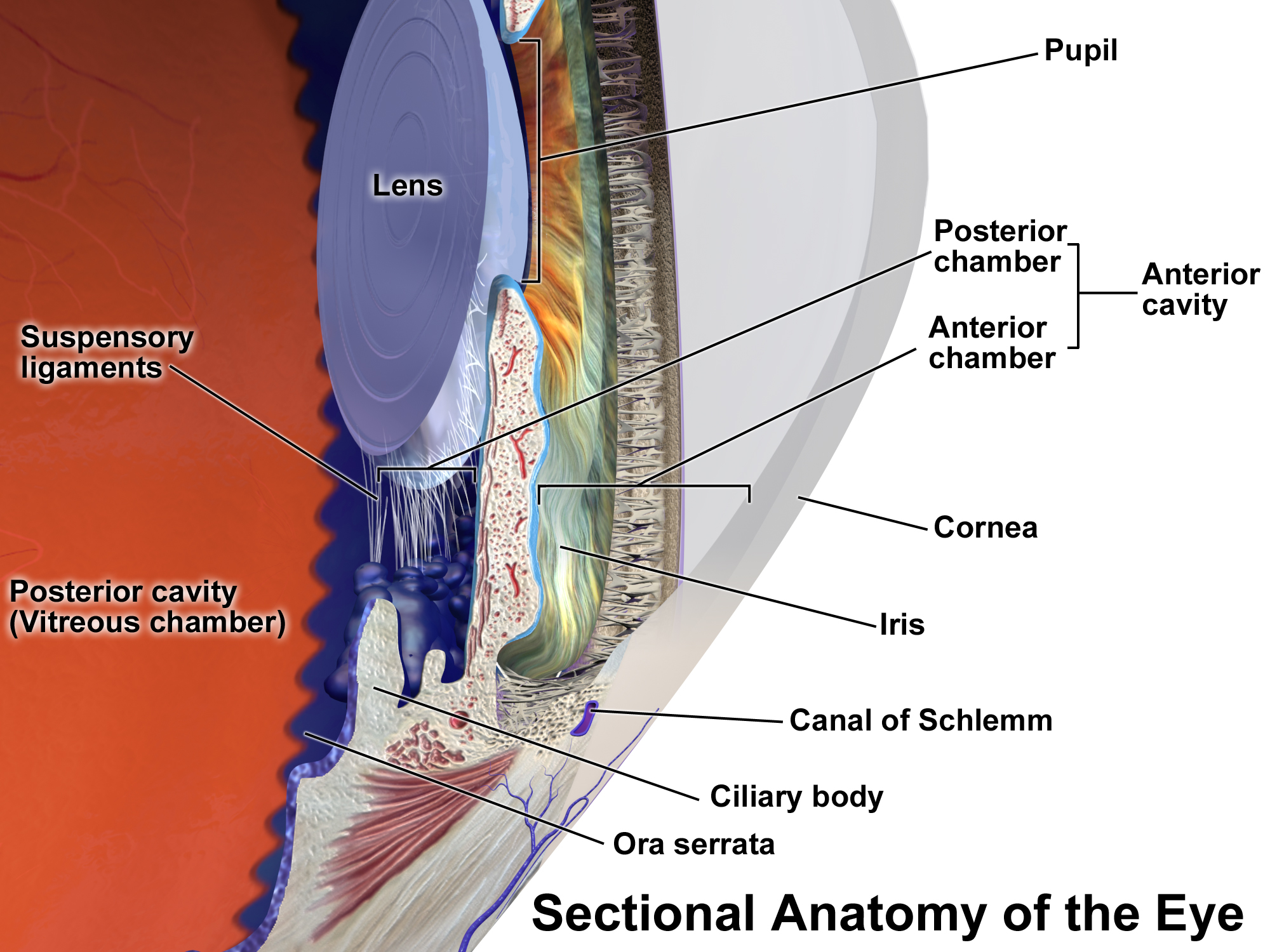
- Anatomy of the anterior part of the human eye. "Suspensory ligaments" are labeled at left.

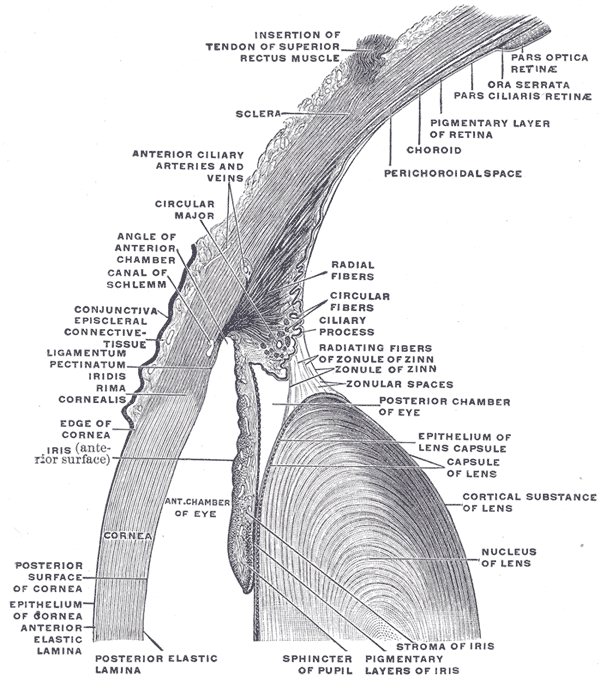
- The upper half of a sagittal section through the front of the eyeball. (Zonule of Zinn visible near center.)

Details

Identifiers
- Latin: zonula ciliaris
- TA98: A15.2.05.015
- TA2: 6795
- FMA: 58838

In human anatomy, the zonule of Zinn (/ˈtsɪn/; also called the ciliary zonule or Zinn's membrane after Johann Gottfried Zinn) is a ring of fibrous strands forming a zonule (little band) that connects the ciliary body with the crystalline lens of the eye. The Zonular fibers are viscoelastic cables, although their component microfibrils are stiff structures. These fibers are sometimes collectively referred to as the suspensory ligaments of the lens, as they act like suspensory ligaments.

== Development ==
The non-pigmented ciliary epithelial cells of the eye synthesize portions of the zonules.

== Anatomy ==
The zonule of Zinn is split into two layers: a thin layer, which lies near the hyaloid fossa, and a thicker layer, which is a collection of zonular fibers. Together, the fibers are known as the suspensory ligament of the lens. The zonules are about 1–2 μm in diameter.

The zonules attach to the lens capsule 2 mm anterior and 1 mm posterior to the equator, and arise of the ciliary epithelium from the pars plana region as well as from the valleys between the ciliary processes in the pars plicata.

When colour granules are displaced from the zonules of Zinn (by friction against the lens), the irises slowly fade. In some cases those colour granules clog the channels and lead to pigmentary glaucoma.

The zonules are primarily made of fibrillin, a connective tissue protein. Mutations in the fibrillin gene lead to the condition Marfan syndrome, and consequences include an increased risk of lens dislocation.

== Clinical appearance ==
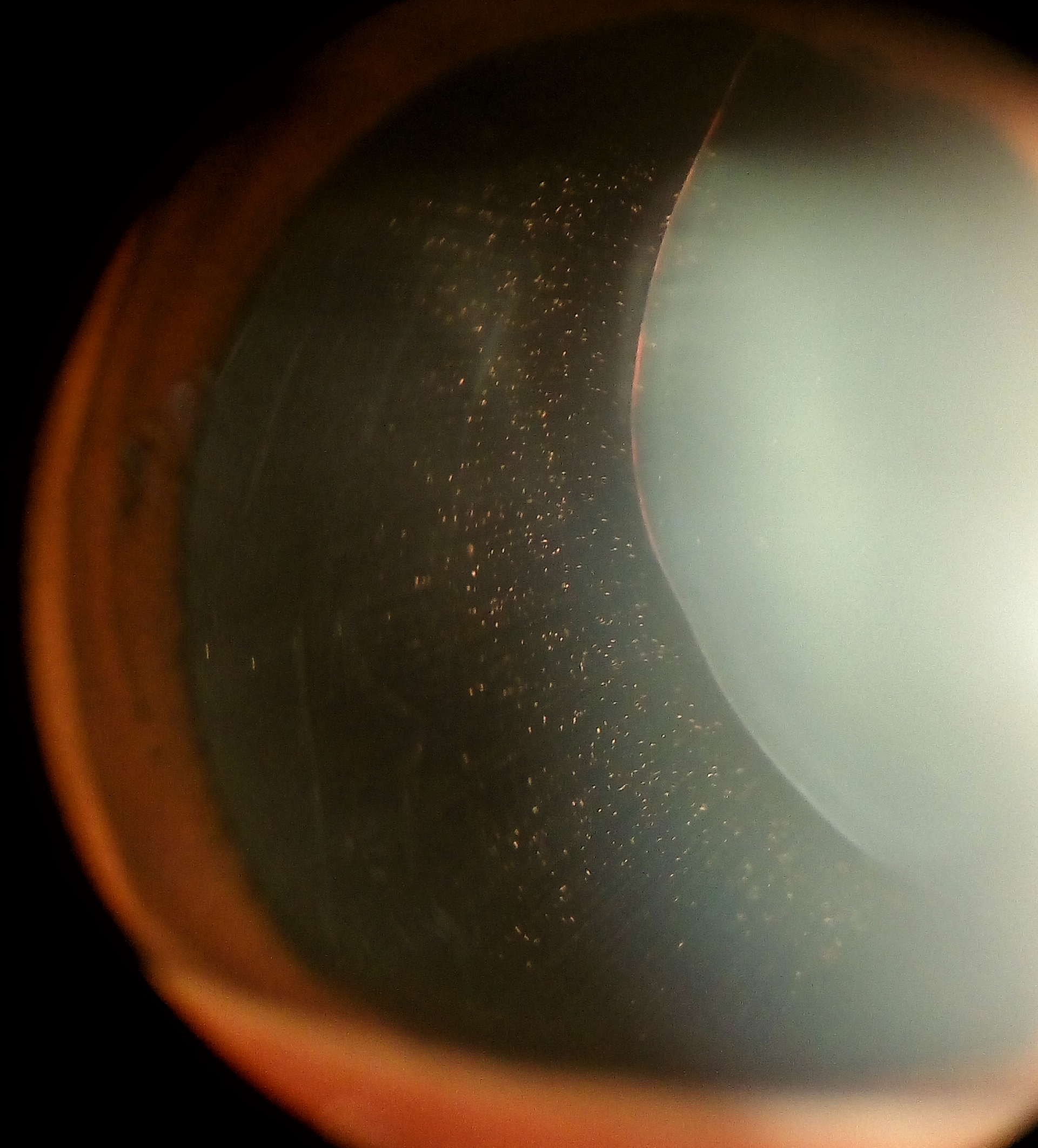
Zonules of Zinn exposed due to exceptional mydriasis in a case of ectopia lentis associated with Marfan syndrome

The zonules of Zinn are difficult to visualize using a slit lamp, but may be seen with exceptional dilation of the pupil, or if a coloboma of the iris or a subluxation of the lens is present. The number of zonules present in a person appears to decrease with age. The zonules insert around the outer margin of the lens (equator), both anteriorly and posteriorly.

== Function ==
Securing the lens to the optical axis and transferring forces from the ciliary muscle in accommodation. When colour granules are displaced from the zonules of Zinn, caused by friction of the lens, the iris can slowly fade. These colour granules can clog the channels and lead to pigmentary glaucoma.

== Additional images ==
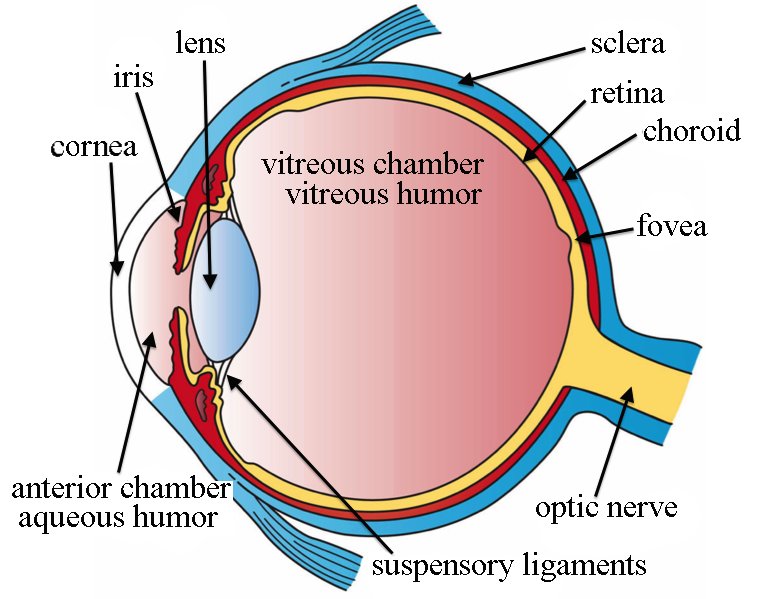
Structures of the eye labeled

Another labeled view of the structures of the eye
