= List of Philadelphia Phillies owners and executives =

The Philadelphia Phillies are a Major League Baseball (MLB) team based in Philadelphia, Pennsylvania. The Phillies compete in MLB as a member club of the National League (NL) East division. In the franchise's history, the owners and ownership syndicates of the team have employed 11 general managers (GMs) and appointed 15 team presidents. The GM controls player transactions, hiring and firing of the coaching staff, and negotiates with players and agents regarding contracts. The team president is the representative for the owner or the ownership group within the front office and is responsible for overseeing the team's staff, minor league farm system, and scouting.

The longest-tenured general manager is Paul Owens, with 11 years of service to the team in that role, from 1972 to 1983. Owens also served as the team manager in 1972, and from 1983 to 1984. After this time, he served as a team executive until 2003, and was inducted into the Philadelphia Baseball Wall of Fame in recognition of his services. The longest-tenured owner is Bob Carpenter, Jr., who was the team's primary shareholder from 1943 to 1972. He appointed the team's first general manager, Herb Pennock, during his tenure. In combination with his son, Ruly, the Carpenter family owned the Phillies for nearly 50 years (until 1981) until it was sold to Bill Giles, son of former league president Warren Giles. The Phillies are currently overseen by team president, Dave Dombrowski.

== Presidents and owners ==
The Phillies have employed 15 team presidents since their founding in 1883, beginning with sporting goods salesman Al Reach. The longest-tenured president is Bob Carpenter, Jr., who oversaw the club for 30 years. Currently, the office of team president is held by David Dombrowski, who assumed the mantle in 2020. Ownership groups have often included the team president, but at other times, such as the tenure of Charles Phelps Taft, others were appointed to fill the president's role.

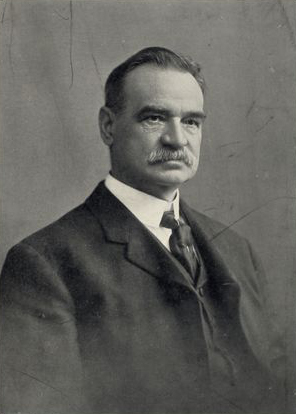
Al Reach was the Phillies' first president.

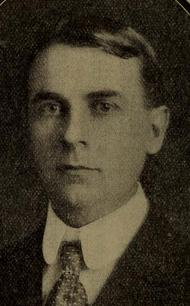
William Baker, former president and owner from 1913 to 1930

All-time team presidents and owners
Name	Position	Tenure	Ref
Alfred J. Reach	President and owner	1883–1902	
John I. Rogers	Owner	1883–1902	
James Potter	President and owner	1903–1909	
William J. Shettsline	President	1905–1908	
Israel W. Durham	President and owner	1909	
Charles P. Taft	Owner	1909–1913	
Horace S. Fogel	President	1909–1912	
Alfred D. Wiler	Interim president	1912–1913	
William H. Locke	President and owner	1913	
William F. Baker	President and owner	1913–1930	
Lewis C. Ruch	President	1931–1932	
Gerald P. Nugent	President	1932–1943	
William D. Cox	President and owner	1943	
Robert R. M. Carpenter, Jr.	President and owner	1943–1972	
Robert R. M. Carpenter III	President and owner	1972–1981	
William Y. Giles	President and owner	1981–1997	
David P. Montgomery	President and owner	1997–2014	
L. Patrick D. Gillick	President	2015	
John Middleton	Owner	2015–present	
Andrew B. MacPhail	President	2016–2020	
David Dombrowski	President of Baseball Operations	2020-present	

== General managers ==
Key to symbols in tables below
†	Elected to the National Baseball Hall of Fame and Museum
§	Member of the Philadelphia Baseball Wall of Fame

The Phillies' first GM was Herb Pennock, selected by owner Bob Carpenter, Jr. to oversee the team when he went into the army; before this time, GM duties were handled primarily by the team owner, and this would continue after Pennock's tenure when a GM was not present. On September 10, 2015, the Phillies announced they would not extend GM Rubén Amaro, Jr.'s contract. Amaro had led the team since 2008.

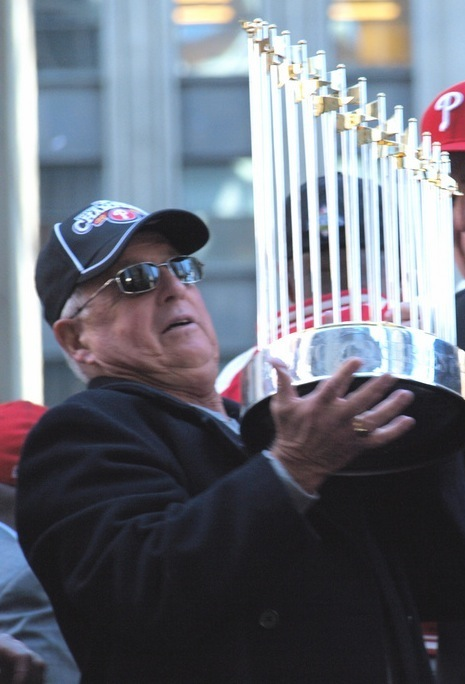
Pat Gillick was the tenth GM and sixth president in franchise history who led the Phillies to the World Championship in 2008.

All-time general managers
Name	Tenure	Ref
Herbert J. Pennock^{†}	1944–1948	
Robert R. M. Carpenter, Jr.^{[a]}	1950–1953	
H. Roy Hamey	1954–1958	
John J. Quinn	1959–1972	
Paul F. Owens^{§}	1972–1983	
William Y. Giles^{[b]}	1984–1987	
William F. Woodward	1987–1988	
J. Leroy Thomas	1988–1997	
Ed Wade	1998–2005	
L. Patrick D. Gillick^{†}	2006–2008	
Rubén Amaro, Jr.	2008–2015	
Matthew Klentak	2015–2020	
Sam Fuld	2020–2024	
Preston Mattingly	2024–present	

=== Footnotes ===
- ^{a} Carpenter, as the owner, assumed GM duties after Pennock's death in 1948.
- ^{b} Giles, as team president, assumed GM duties after Owens' resignation in 1983.

== See also ==
Other executives

- Jim Baumer (director of scouting)
- Howie Bedell (director of farm system)
- Dallas Green (director of scouting; special assistant to the GM)
- Jay Hankins (director of scouting)
- Chuck LaMar (assistant GM)
- Gene Martin (director of farm system)
- Sean Walker (Chief Technology Officer)

Related lists

- List of Philadelphia Phillies managers
