= History of the Philadelphia Phillies =

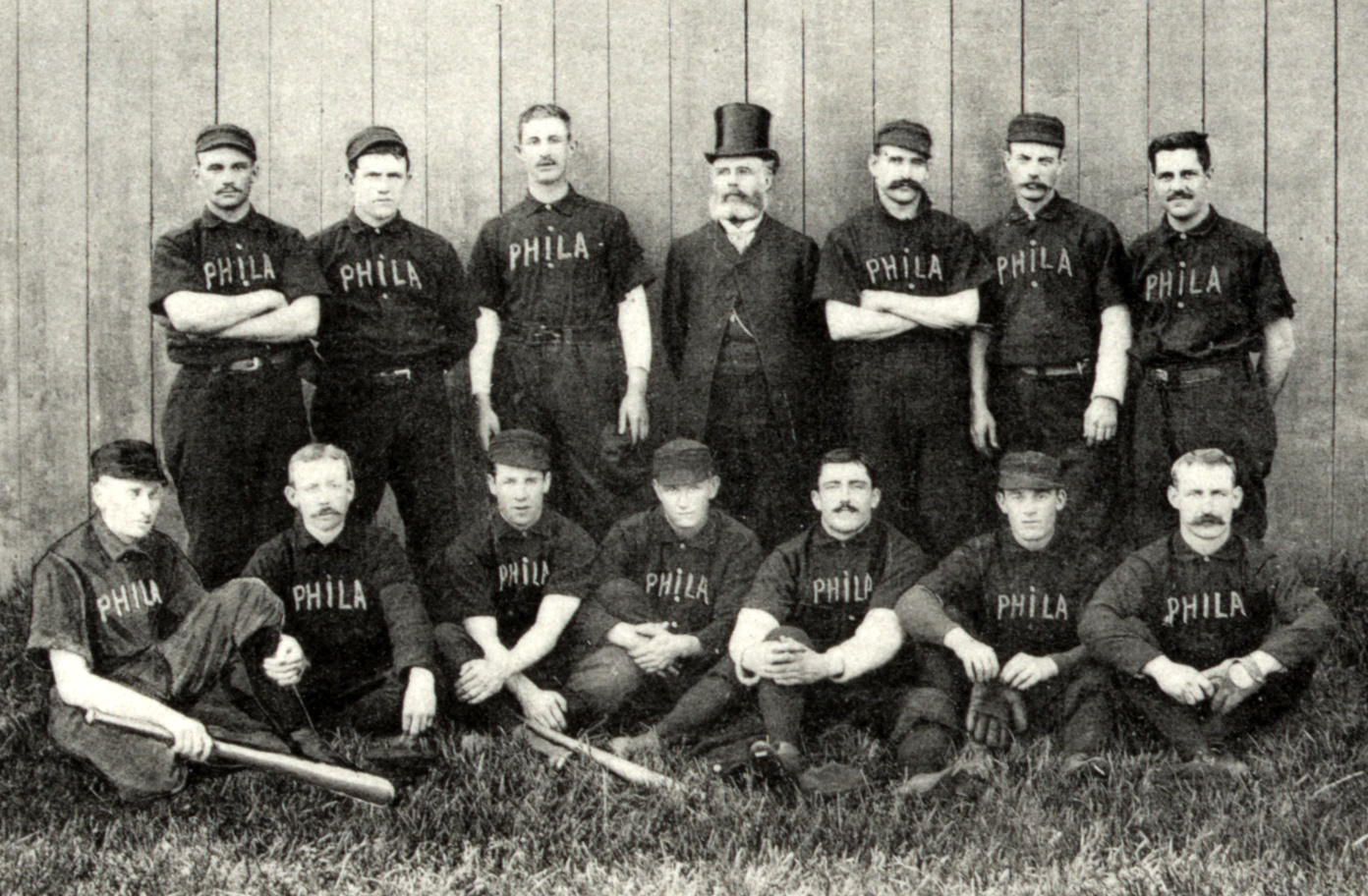
1888 Philadelphia Phillies

The history of the Philadelphia Phillies of Major League Baseball's National League began on November 1, 1882, with the organization of the Philadelphia Ball Club Limited. In 1883, this organization won the franchise rights to Philadelphia when the city was selected to replace the Massachusetts-based Worcesters, who had folded after the 1882 season.

The franchise made its first post-season appearance in 1915, losing to the Boston Red Sox in the World Series. The Phillies franchise also has the second-longest streak of consecutive losing seasons in American professional sports, 16 straight from 1933 to 1948; the record stood until 2009, when it was broken by the Pittsburgh Pirates. After another National League pennant in 1950, the Phillies did not return to the postseason until 1976, beginning a period of extended success for the franchise. From 1975 to 1983, they won five East Division championships as well as the first-half championship in the strike-shortened 1981 season. The team made the playoffs five straight seasons from 2007 through 2011.

The Phillies currently compete in the National League East division. Since 2004, the team's home has been Citizens Bank Park in the South Philadelphia section of the city. The franchise has won two World Series championships (against Kansas City in 1980, Tampa Bay in 2008), and eight National League pennants.

In its 144-season history, the franchise has employed 51 managers and 10 general managers (GMs). Dallas Green and Charlie Manuel are the only Phillies managers to win a World Series: Green in 1980, and Manuel in 2008. Manuel is also the only Phillies manager to win two pennants, and on the last day of the 2011 regular season, surpassed Gene Mauch's 644-win record as the winningest manager in franchise history, taking two fewer seasons than Mauch to accomplish that feat. The longest-tenured general manager is Paul Owens, with 11 years of service to the team as the general manager, from 1972 to 1983. Owens also served as the team manager in 1972, and from 1983 to 1984. After this time, he served as a team executive until 2003, and was inducted into the Philadelphia Baseball Wall of Fame in recognition of his services. The manager with the highest winning percentage over a full season or more was Arthur Irwin, whose .575 winning percentage is fourth on the all-time wins list for Phillies managers.

== Origins ==
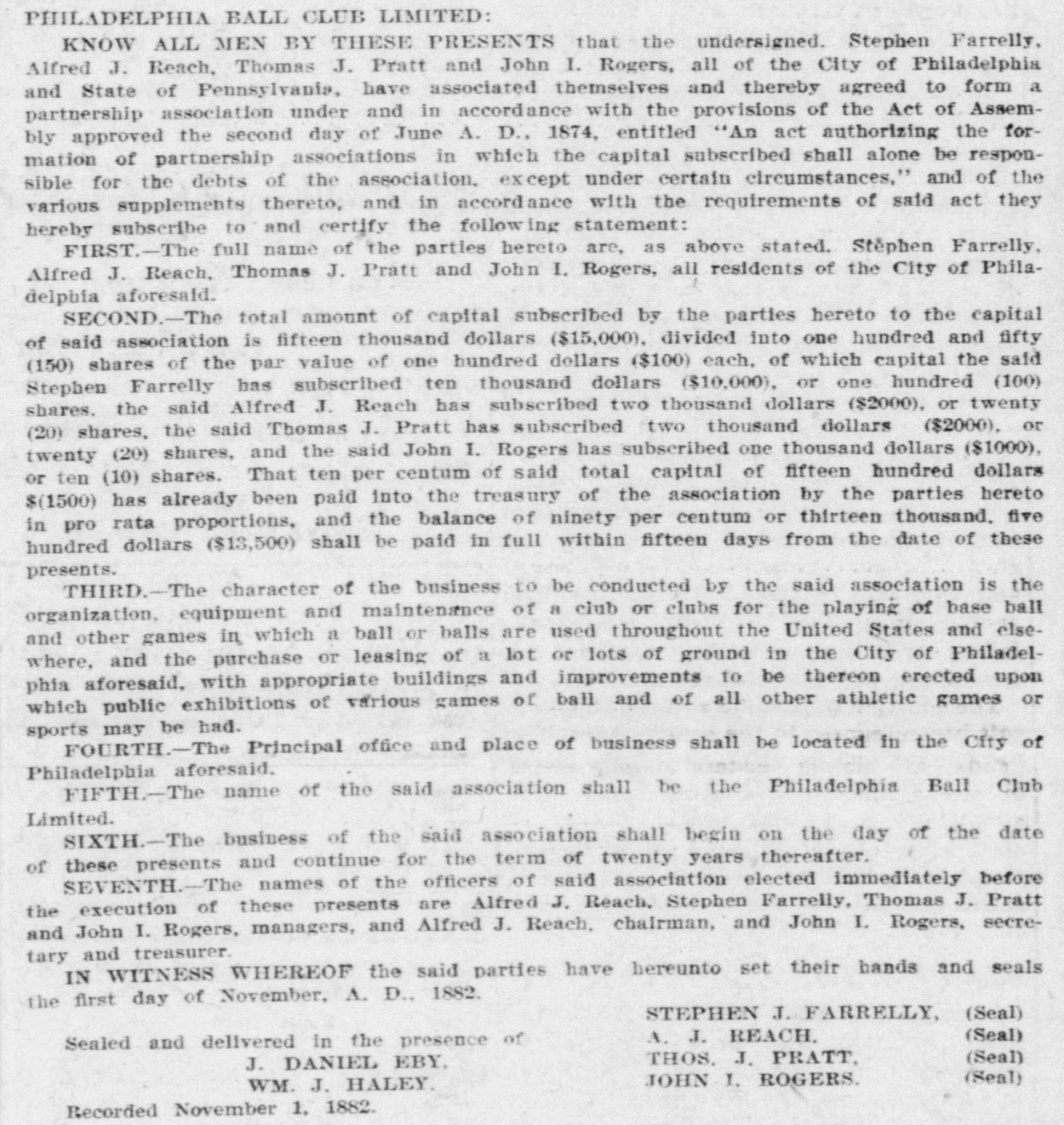
Article of co-partnership of the Philadelphia Ball Club Limited (November 1, 1882) establishing the Philadelphia Phillies

The Philadelphia Phillies were organized and founded on November 1, 1882, as the Philadelphia Ball Club Limited and capitalized with $15,000 by a group led by sporting goods manufacturer Al Reach (a pioneering professional baseball player) and attorney John Rogers. The purpose of the organization was "for the playing of base ball ... in the City of Philadelphia."

Reach and Rogers took the place in the League vacated by the Worcester Worcesters, a franchise that had folded in 1882. Some sources, including the Phillies themselves, have claimed that Reach and Rogers bought the Worcester club and moved them to Philadelphia. However, contemporary references document that there is no direct link between the two teams. Most notably, no players from the 1882 Worcesters came to the 1883 Phillies.

The Eastern Championship Association Philadelphia Phillies had played exhibition and league games in 1881 and 1882 and held its games at Recreation Park, and its owners included those who would own the National League Phillies. When the National League rights to Philadelphia were acquired late in 1882, and with the Philadelphia Athletics still operating, the new team assumed the Phillies nickname.

The Phillies played their first game on April 2, 1883, when they defeated the amateur Manayunk Ashlands by the score of 11–0 at Recreation Park. The Philadelphia Inquirer referred to the team as the Phillies from the first game.

In 1884, Harry Wright, the former manager of baseball's first openly professional team, the Cincinnati Red Stockings, was recruited as manager in hopes of reversing the team's fortunes. Wright brought immediate credibility to the franchise. His death in 1895 would be mourned by the Phillies and its supporters.

In 1887, they began play at 15th Street and Huntingdon Avenue at the Philadelphia Ball Park, which after 1923 came to be known as Baker Bowl. The team was competitive in the 1890s. The standout players of the franchise in the era were Billy Hamilton, Sam Thompson, and Ed Delahanty, who in 1896 set the major-league record (since tied by several others) with 4 home runs in a single game.

Due to growing disagreements about the direction of the team and the National League, Reach sold his interest to Rogers in 1899.

== Early 20th century ==
The Phillies' had suppressed the wages of their best players Ed Delahanty and Nap Lajoie in the late 1890s. The American League was launched in 1901 to break the National League's monopoly and offer higher wages to its players. After fighting their best players, the Phillies saw them sign with the American League including a number of players who ended up playing for their crosstown rivals, the Athletics, owned by former Phillies minority owner Benjamin Shibe.

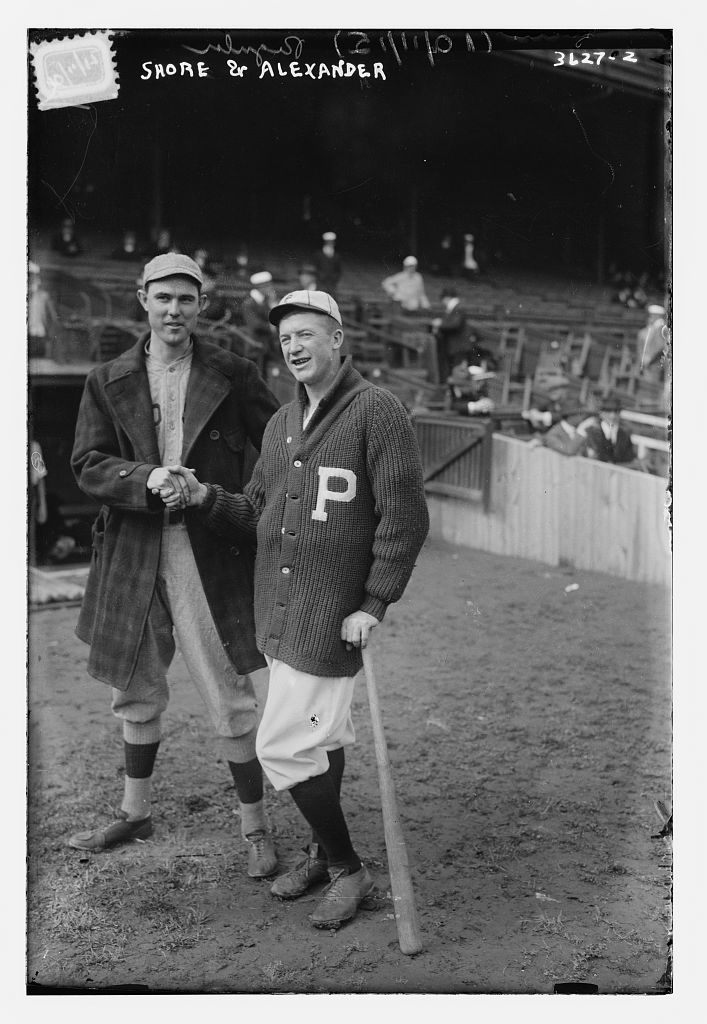
Starting pitchers Ernie Shore and Grover Cleveland Alexander shake hands during the 1915 World Series.

Unwilling to compete for players, and while their former teammates throve (the AL's first five batting champions were former Phillies), the remaining squad fared dismally, finishing 46 games out of first place in 1902—the first of three straight years finishing either seventh or eighth. To add tragedy, a balcony collapsed during a game at the Philadelphia Ball Park in 1903, killing 12 and injuring hundreds. Rogers was forced to sell the Phillies to avoid being ruined by an avalanche of lawsuits.

The Phillies won their first pennant in 1915 thanks to the pitching of Grover Cleveland Alexander and the batting prowess of Gavvy Cravath, who set the major-league single-season record for home runs with 24. However, by 1917 Alexander had been traded away when owner William Baker refused to increase his salary. Baker was known for running the Phillies very cheaply; for instance, during much of his tenure there was only one scout in the entire organization.

The effect of the Alexander trade was immediate. In 1918, only three years after winning the pennant, the Phillies finished sixth, thirteen games under .500. It was the start of one of the longest streaks of futility in baseball history. From 1918 to 1948, the Phillies had only one winning record (78–76 in 1932), only finished higher than sixth twice, and were never a serious factor past June. During this stretch, they finished last a total of 17 times and next to last seven times. This saddled the franchise with a reputation for failure that dogged it for many years. For instance, a 1962 cartoon in a baseball magazine depicted a ballplayer arriving at a French Foreign Legion outpost, explaining, "I was released by the Phillies!"

The team's primary stars during the 1920s and 1930s were outfielders Cy Williams, Lefty O'Doul, and Chuck Klein, who captured the vaunted Triple Crown in 1933. Unfortunately, Philadelphia's cozy Baker Bowl proved to be a fertile hitting ground for Phillies opponents as well, and in 1930, the team surrendered 1199 runs, a major-league record still standing today.

== 1930s–1940s ==
Baker died in 1930 and was succeeded by Charlie Ruch, who had been one of Baker's partners in the syndicate that bought the team in 1913. After only two years, however, Ruch retired on the advice of his doctor. With the support of Baker's widow, team business manager Gerald Nugent was chosen as team president. Nugent had married longtime team secretary Mae Mallon in 1925, and Mallon had inherited 500 shares of Phillies stock upon Baker's death. Baker's widow died in 1934, leaving her 700 shares in the team to Mae Mallon Nugent and her son, Gerald Nugent Jr. Combined with his own shares, this effectively gave Gerald Sr. controlling interest.

On May 1, 1933, the Phillies celebrated the franchise's fiftieth anniversary. The Phillies welcomed back former players to be introduced and cheered by the crowd, and play a five inning exhibition game prior to their regularly scheduled game against the Pittsburgh Pirates. Present were former Phillies players of the late 19th century and first decades of the 20th century including John Titus, Roy Thomas, Otto Knabe, Hans Lobert, Kitty Bransfield, Dick Hartley, Mickey Doolan, Red Dooin, Harry Coveleski, Al Maul, Jerry Donovan, George Andrews, Jack Clements, Monte Cross, Jess Pernell, Stan Baumgartner, and Charles Fulmer, who was 82-years old and had played for the 1875 Philadelphia White Stockings in the National Association.

Unlike Baker, Nugent badly wanted to build a winning team. For example, under his watch the Phillies began building a rudimentary farm system for the first time in their history. He also had an eye for spotting obscure talent. However, he did not have the financial means to get the Phillies out of the second division. He was forced to trade what little talent the team had to make ends meet, and often had to use some creative financial methods to even field a team at all.

One problem was the Phillies' National League Park. Once considered one of the finest parks in baseball, it was not well maintained from the 1910s onward. For instance, until 1925 the Phillies used a flock of sheep to trim the grass. Fans were often showered with rust whenever one of Klein's home runs hit girders. The entire right field grandstand collapsed in 1926, forcing the Phillies to move to the A's Shibe Park (five blocks west on Lehigh Avenue from Baker Bowl) for 1927.

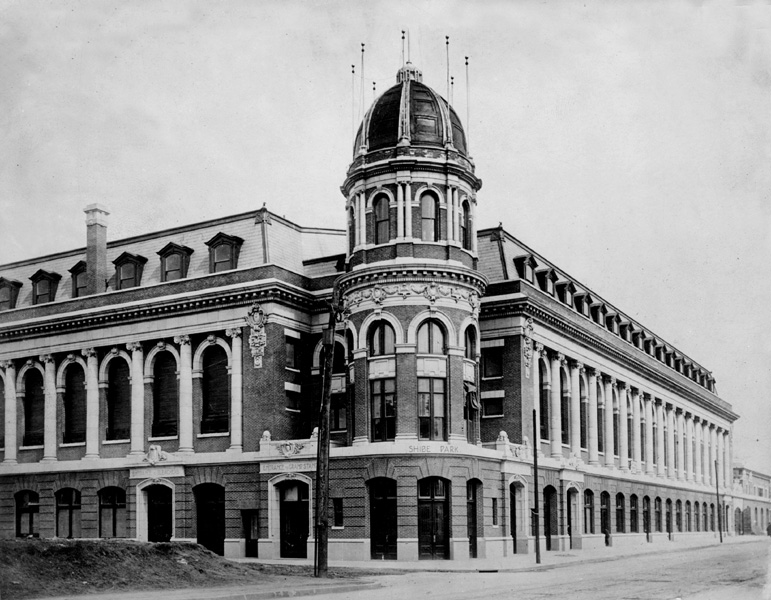
Shibe Park / Connie Mack Stadium, home of the Phillies from 1938 to 1970

For several years—particularly after Nugent took control of the team—the Phillies tried to move to Shibe Park on a permanent basis as tenants of the A's. However, the park was owned by the estate of former Cubs owner Charles Webb Murphy, who refused to let the Phillies out of their lease at first. Finally, when Nugent threatened to sue, the Murphy estate agreed to "suspend" the lease for five years in return for yearly payments, clearing the way for the Phillies to move to Shibe Park.

The nadir came in 1941, when the Phillies finished with a ghastly 43–111 record, setting a franchise record for losses in a season. A year later, they needed an advance from the league just to go to spring training. Nugent realized he did not have enough money to operate the team in 1943, and put it up for sale. He found a willing buyer in minor-league executive Bill Veeck, who had the intention of stocking it with Negro league stars. Unfortunately for Veeck, when Baseball Commissioner Kenesaw Mountain Landis, an ardent segregationist, found out about it, he pressured National League president Ford Frick to have the league take over the Phillies. The story was initially challenged by a 1998 article in the Society for American Baseball Research's The National Pastime, arguing that Philadelphia's black press made no mention of a sale to Veeck. However, in 2006, Jules Tygiel published an article in the 2006 edition of Baseball Research Journal which proved Veeck indeed planned to buy the Phillies. He expanded on it in an appendix, entitled "Did Bill Veeck Lie About His Plan to Purchase the '43 Phillies?", published in Paul Dickson's biography, Bill Veeck: Baseball's Greatest Maverick. Joseph Thomas Moore wrote in his biography of Doby, "Bill Veeck planned to buy the Philadelphia Phillies with the as yet unannounced intention of breaking that color line."

A week later, the league sold the Phillies to William D. Cox. Nugent had begun phasing out "Phillies" in favor of "Phils" during the 1942 season, but Cox almost immediately restored "Phillies" to the team's jerseys. For the first time in decades, the Phillies had an owner who was not only committed to building a winner, but had the financial resources to do so. He immediately poured some of his wealth into the team payroll. He also devoted significant resources to player development, including the farm system, for the first time in the history of the franchise. His efforts had an immediate impact. By July, they had won only four fewer games than they had in the previous season, and ultimately managed to get out of the National League cellar for the first time in five years. Although they were still a long way from contention, the Phillies' long-suffering fans appreciated what Cox was trying to do; attendance rose for the first time in nearly 30 years.

However, Cox was a very hands-on owner. When manager Bucky Harris objected to Cox's interference, Cox fired him. Harris was still simmering the next day, and dropped a bombshell to the Philadelphia press in his hotel room: he had evidence that Cox was placing bets on his own team. Cox initially claimed that the bets were made by his business associates. However, he eventually admitted to placing several small bets, not knowing it was against the rules. This made no difference to Landis, who banned Cox from baseball for life. Author Rich Westcott was quoted by Sports Illustrated as saying Cox knew "next to nothing about baseball. Otherwise, why would he have bet on the Phillies?" Soon afterward, Cox sold controlling interest in the Phillies to DuPont heir Robert R.M. Carpenter, who turned control over to his son, Bob Jr.

Carpenter's first act was to try to change the team's name (and more importantly, its image as a chronic loser) to the "Blue Jays" after a citywide vote on a new nickname. In announcing the change, Carpenter said "he had always admired the blue jay and its scrappy qualities." However, "Phillies" continued to appear on the team's jerseys, with a blue jay appearing on the sleeves. The student council of Johns Hopkins University, whose varsity teams are also known as the Blue Jays, vehemently protested Carpenter's decision, claiming that the change dishonored their school due to the Phillies' losing history. The nickname was officially dropped on January 10, 1950.

== 1950s ==
=== In general ===
On May 16, 1953, Curt Simmons pitched an almost-perfect game, when he retired 27 consecutive batters, after the Milwaukee Braves' leadoff batter reached base in the first inning on a single. A year later, on May 13, 1954, Robin Roberts likewise pitched an almost-perfect game, when he retired 27 consecutive batters, after the Cincinnati Reds' leadoff batter hit a home run in the first inning.

=== The Whiz Kids ===
Like Cox, Bob Carpenter Jr. was not afraid to spend the money it took to build a contender. He immediately started signing young players and invested even more money in the farm system. The Phillies quickly developed a solid core of young players, known as the "Whiz Kids", that included future Hall of Famers Richie Ashburn and Robin Roberts. This coincided with the final collapse of the A's. Philadelphia had been an "A's town" for most of the first half of the 20th century. Even though the A's had fielded teams as bad or worse than the Phillies for most of the time since the 1930s, the A's continued to trounce the Phillies at the gate. However, a series of poor baseball and business decisions on the A's part allowed the Phillies to win the hearts of Philadelphia's long-suffering fans.

Things started coming together for the Phillies in 1949, when they rocketed up the standings to third place with an 81–73 record. Although the season had essentially been a two-team race between Brooklyn and St. Louis, it was still the Phillies' first appearance in the first division in 31 years. It was also a fitting tribute to Bob Carpenter Sr., who had died in June and left Bob Jr. in full control of the team.

Although the Phillies led the National League standings for most of the 1950 season, a late-season tailspin (triggered by the loss of starting pitcher Curt Simmons to National Guard service) caused the team to lose the next eight of ten games. On the last day of the season, the Phillies hung onto a one-game lead when Dick Sisler's dramatic tenth-inning, three-run home run against the Dodgers clinched the team's first pennant in 35 years. That same year, the A's finished with the worst record in baseball. In the World Series, exhausted from their late-season plunge and recipients of poor luck, the Phillies were swept by the New York Yankees in four straight games. Nonetheless, this appearance cemented the Phillies' status as the city's favorite team. In 1954, the Athletics moved to Kansas City, and sold Shibe Park (renamed Connie Mack Stadium in 1953) to the Phillies. Carpenter did not want to buy it, believing it would cost the Phillies more in the long run to own the park than it would renting it from the Athletics. For the past 16 and a half years, the Phillies had paid the A's ten cents' rent for every person that came through the turnstiles at their games. However, no other facility in the Delaware Valley was suitable even for temporary use, so Carpenter reluctantly bought the park.

Many thought that the Whiz Kids, with a young core of talented players, would be a force in the league for years to come. However, the team finished with a 73–81 record in 1951, and except for a 2nd-place tie in 1964, did not finish higher than third place in any format until 1975. Their lack of success was partly blamed on Carpenter's unwillingness to integrate his team after winning a pennant with an all-white team. The Phillies were the last National League team to sign a black player, a full 10 years after Jackie Robinson made his debut for the Brooklyn Dodgers. Their competitive futility was highlighted by a record that still stands: in 1961, the Phillies lost 23 games in a row, the worst losing streak in the majors since 1900.

In 1947, when Robinson was signed to the Brooklyn Dodgers, Phillies general manager Herb Pennock called Dodgers team president Branch Rickey and told him not to "bring that nigger here with the rest of the team." When the Dodgers arrived with Robinson in the lineup, Philadelphia players stood on the top step of the dugout and pointed bats at him while making shooting noises. Earlier in the season, when the Phillies had visited Ebbets Field, the Phillies players, led by their manager, Ben Chapman, directed so much verbal abuse at Robinson that it served to rally the Dodgers around their teammate and defend him against further attacks.

== "Phold" of 1964 ==
Between 1953 and 1962, the Phillies finished at least 18 games out of first place every year, hitting a low point in 1961 when they lost 107 games and finished 46 games out of first. During the 1963 season, the Phillies began to climb back to respectability. Throughout the 1964 season, they seemed destined to make it to the World Series, with excellent performances from players such as rookie third baseman Dick Allen (who won the Rookie of the Year award), starters Jim Bunning (obtained from the Detroit Tigers at the start of the season to shore up the pitching staff) and Chris Short, and star right fielder Johnny Callison. On Father's Day, Bunning pitched a perfect game against the New York Mets, the first in Phillies history.

TV Guide went to press with a World Series preview that featured a photo of Connie Mack Stadium. However, with a 6 1/2-game lead on the Cincinnati Reds with 12 games remaining in the season, Philadelphia collapsed in a 10-game losing streak (the first seven played at home). The crucial series came when the now second-place Phillies traveled to St. Louis to play the Cardinals after their losing home stand. They dropped the first game of the series to Bob Gibson by a 5–1 score, their eighth loss in a row, dropping them to third place. The Cardinals would sweep the three-game set and assume first place for good. The Phillies still had a chance to force an unprecedented three-way tie for first after the Cardinals dropped the first two games of their last season series to the New York Mets. However, the Cardinals won their last game of the season, leaving the Phillies tied with the Reds for second place—just one game out of first. The "Phold of '64" is frequently mentioned as the worst collapse in sports history.

== 1970s ==
By the late 1950s, Carpenter decided that the Phillies needed a new home. He never wanted to buy Connie Mack Stadium in the first place, and was now convinced there was no way he could make money playing there. The stadium did not have nearly enough parking; indeed, it had never been well suited to automobile traffic, having been built before the Model T was introduced. It could not be expanded, and the neighborhood around it had already gone to seed. In 1961, as a first step to finding a new park, he sold Connie Mack Stadium to a consortium of New York investors, taking a million-dollar loss on his purchase of just seven years earlier. Those investors then flipped the park to another consortium, who began preparing to replace it with a bowling alley and discount store once the Phillies' lease ran out in 1967. Finally, Philadelphia Eagles owner Jerry Wolman bought the park in 1964. The Phillies remained at the old stadium until 1970. In the last game played there, the Phillies avoided last place by beating the Expos 2–1. The Phillies opened the new Veterans Stadium in 1971, with hopes of a new beginning. In their first season there, pitcher Rick Wise hurled a no-hitter. On September 18, 1971, Wise pitched another near-perfect game, in which he gave up a home run to the Chicago Cubs' leadoff batter in the second inning, but then did not allow another baserunner until the 12th inning, with two outs. He had been perfect for 10 2/3 retiring 32 consecutive batters—the record for most consecutive outs in a game by a winning pitcher. That same season, Harry Kalas joined the Phillies broadcasting team. In 1972, the Phillies were the worst team in baseball, but newly acquired Steve Carlton won nearly half their games (27 of 59 team wins). In that same year, Bob Carpenter retired and passed the team ownership to his son Ruly.

By 1974, the Phillies began their quest for a championship that would be theirs 6 years later. That year second baseman Dave Cash coined the phrase "Yes We Can" for the Phils. Indeed, for a while, it looked as if they could. They led the division for 51 days; however, in August and September, the Phillies went 25–32 and it was "No They Couldn't".

The Phillies achieved some success in the mid-1970s. With such players as Carlton, third baseman Mike Schmidt, shortstop Larry Bowa, and outfielder Greg Luzinski, the Phillies won three straight division titles (1976–78). However, they fell short in the NLCS, against the Reds in 1976 and the Dodgers in 1977 and 1978. In 1979, the Phillies acquired Pete Rose, the spark that would put them over the top.

== 1980: First World Series championship ==
The Phils won the NL East in 1980, but to win the league championship, they would have to defeat the Houston Astros. In a memorable NLCS, with 4 of the 5 games needing extra innings, they fell behind 2–1 but battled back to squeeze past the Astros on a tenth-inning game-winning hit by center fielder Garry Maddox, and the city celebrated its first pennant in 30 years. The entire series saw only one home run, a game-winning two-run blast by Phillies slugger Greg Luzinski in the Phillies' opening 3–1 win in Game 1 at Philadelphia.

Facing Kansas City in the 1980 World Series, the Phillies won their first world championship in 6 games, thanks to the timely hitting of Mike Schmidt and Pete Rose. Schmidt, who was the NL MVP for the 1980 season, also won the World Series MVP finals award on the strength of his 8 for 21 hitting (.381 average), including game-winning hits in Game 2 and the clinching Game 6. Thus, the Phillies became the last of the 16 teams that made up the major leagues from 1903 to 1960 to win a World Series, doing so 14 years after the Baltimore Orioles (formerly the St. Louis Browns) became the last original American League team to win a World Series. By comparison, the other 15 teams had each appeared in at least three World Series and won it at least once.

== 1981–1992 ==
During the early 1980s, when baseball was becoming more drug-conscious, several Philadelphia players admitted to having used amphetamines from time to time. A memorable Philadelphia Daily News headline dubbed the team "The Pillies".

The team made the playoffs in the strike-shortened 1981 season losing to Montreal in the special pre-LCS playoff series. After the 1981 season Ruly Carpenter, dissatisfied with changes in baseball's labor environment, sold the team to a group of investors led by team executives Bill Giles and David Montgomery for $32.5 million—a handsome return on his grandfather's $400,000 investment 38 years earlier.

In 1983, the "Wheeze Kids" won their fourth pennant, but lost the 1983 World Series to Baltimore in 5 games.

The 1983 season was the Phillies' centennial year. On September 28, they defeated the Chicago Cubs, 13–6, at Wrigley Field. This victory gave the Phillies the National League East Division championship. It was also the 7,000th win in team history.

The Phillies struggled for most of the rest of the 1980s and early 1990s. Aside from a distant second-place finish in 1986 (21 1/2 games behind the Mets), they were not a serious factor in a pennant race for the rest of the decade. During this stretch, the 1984 team was the only other one that even managed to get to the .500 mark. During this time, the Phillies often struggled to attract more than 25,000 people to Veterans Stadium, the biggest in the National League at the time (at over 62,000 people). Even crowds of 40,000 were swallowed up by the cavernous environment.

One factor in the Phillies' decline was the acquisition of Iván DeJesús from the Cubs in return for Bowa and a young prospect named Ryne Sandberg. Although the trade is now reckoned as one of the most lopsided trades in baseball history, it may have made some sense at the time from the Phillies' perspective. Although Sandberg had clearly earned a spot in the majors (he had hit .290 in the minors for two years in a row), the Phillies did not think they had a position for him. He had seen time in the minors at shortstop, second base, third base and center field—spots held by Bowa, Manny Trillo, Schmidt and Maddox, respectively. Nonetheless, the Phillies did not get nearly enough in return. DeJesus only batted .249 in three years with the Phillies, and was out of baseball by 1988. Meanwhile, Sandberg went on to a Hall of Fame career.

On August 15, 1990, Terry Mulholland lost a perfect game in the seventh inning when a San Francisco Giants' batter reached base on a throwing error. The next batter grounded into a double play. Thus, Mulholland faced the perfect-game maximum of 27 batters, but did not qualify for a perfect game. He was credited, however, with a no-hitter.

The 1992 season would end with the Phillies at the bottom of the barrel, at last place in the National League East. However, their fortunes were about to change.

== 1993: Fifth National League championship: Worst to First ==
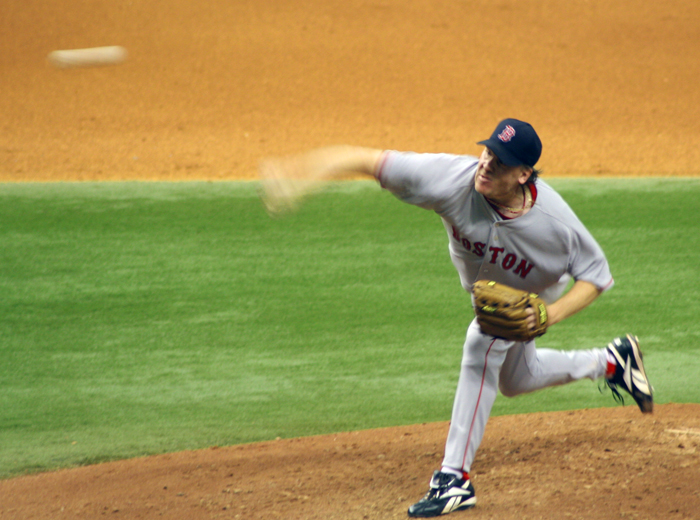
Curt Schilling, pictured here with Boston, was an instrumental cog in the Phillies' 1993 National League pennant win.

The 1993 Phillies were led by stars such as Darren Daulton, John Kruk, Lenny Dykstra, and Curt Schilling. The team was often described as "shaggy", "unkempt", and "dirty". This team was known as a bunch of throw back, whatever it takes kind of players. The previous year, noting the presence of the clean-cut Dale Murphy, Kruk himself described the team as "24 morons and one Mormon" or a bunch of idiots and Murph. Their character endeared them to fans, and attendance reached a record high the following season. As a play on the legendary 1927 New York Yankees' Murderers' Row, the team's dirty, mullet-wearing look was dubbed "Macho Row". To the surprise of their city and the nation, the Phillies powered their way to a 97–65 record and an East division title, all thanks to a big April in which the Fightin's went 17–5. Each game brought a new hero, and the season was filled with odd and extraordinary games. The 1993 Phillies team was also noted for the close bond between the players and coaching staff.

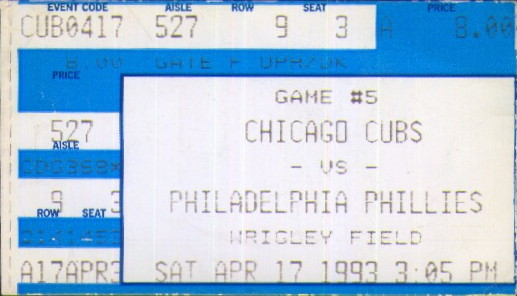
A ticket for a 1993 game between the Phillies and the Chicago Cubs

The Phillies' major contributors on offense were OF Lenny Dykstra, 1B John Kruk, SS Kevin Stocker (a rookie who led the team in batting average, hitting .324), and OF Jim Eisenreich, all of whom hit over .300 for the season. Their pitching staff was led by 16-game winners Curt Schilling and Tommy Greene. Each member of the rotation posted at least 10 wins, while the bullpen was led by elder statesman Larry Andersen and closer Mitch "Wild Thing" Williams, who notched 43 saves and a 3.34 ERA.

The Phillies beat the Atlanta Braves (the two-time defending National League champions) in the 1993 National League Championship Series, four games to two, to earn the fifth pennant in franchise history. They faced the defending world champion Toronto Blue Jays in the 1993 World Series. Philadelphia lost the Series in six games, with Toronto's Joe Carter hitting a walk-off three-run home run off of Mitch Williams in Game 6, to win a second consecutive championship for the Blue Jays. Following that loss, Williams was the subject of death threats and other hostile reaction from some irate Phillies' fans; he left for the Astros.

== 1994–2005 ==
With the 1994 players' strike, most of the Phillies' fan base was greatly offended, and afterward, the team had little success either on the field or at the gate for a decade. Both were negatively affected by the realignment of the Atlanta Braves into the National League East in 1994, as the Braves won the division every year until 2006, often by wide margins. In addition, the nucleus of the 2008 World Series-winning club (Chase Utley, Ryan Howard, Jimmy Rollins, Brett Myers, and Cole Hamels) was developed during this era.

Former Phillie Larry Bowa was hired as manager for the 2001 season, and led the Phillies to an 86–76 record, their first winning season since the 1993 World Series year. They spent most of the first half of the season in first place, and traded first place with the Braves for most of the second half. In the end, they finished two games out of first, the Braves' tightest division race in years. Bowa was named National League Manager of the Year. The Phillies continued to contend for the next few years under Bowa, with the only blemish being an 80–81 season in 2002.

This marker in the Citizens Bank Park parking lot commemorates Veterans Stadium, the Phillies' home for many years.

The following year, in their last season at Veterans Stadium, the Phillies were expected to contend for the World Series after adding such players as Jim Thome, Kevin Millwood, and David Bell to go along with the emerging nucleus of Rollins, Burrell, Wolf, and Vicente Padilla. However, Burrell and Bell slumped miserably at the plate, and the Phillies' inconsistent bullpen led to the team finishing 86–76 and in third place behind the Braves and eventual World Series-winning Florida Marlins.

The opening of the new Citizens Bank Park brought fans new hope, and the team was expected to win the NL East. However, they finished a distant second, and Bowa was fired with two games to go in the season.

Charlie Manuel took over as manager for 2005, and kept the Phillies in contention throughout the season; they were only eliminated from wild card contention on the next-to-last day. However, it was not enough to save the job of general manager Ed Wade; he was fired after his eighth season. Soon after, the Phillies hired Pat Gillick, who, ironically, was the general manager of the 1992 and 1993 Toronto Blue Jays' Championship teams. Despite another late-season disappointment, 2005 saw the Phillies core shift away from veterans such as Thome, Polanco, Abreu, and Wolf to younger home-grown stars such as Rollins, Utley, Brett Myers and Ryan Howard.

== 2006 ==
Continuing what he had begun in the off-season, Gillick engaged in a flurry of trades in an effort to transform the character of the team and to obtain financial flexibility for what he termed "retooling". On July 26, 2006, the Phillies traded backup catcher Sal Fasano to the New York Yankees for minor league infielder Hector Made. Two days later, the Phillies traded third baseman David Bell, who was due to become a free agent during the off-season, to the Milwaukee Brewers for minor league pitcher Wilfredo Laureano. Gillick did not stop there, making a deadline deal that sent outfielder Bobby Abreu and pitcher Cory Lidle to the Yankees in exchange for Matt Smith, C.J. Henry, Carlos Monastrios, and Jesus Sanchez.

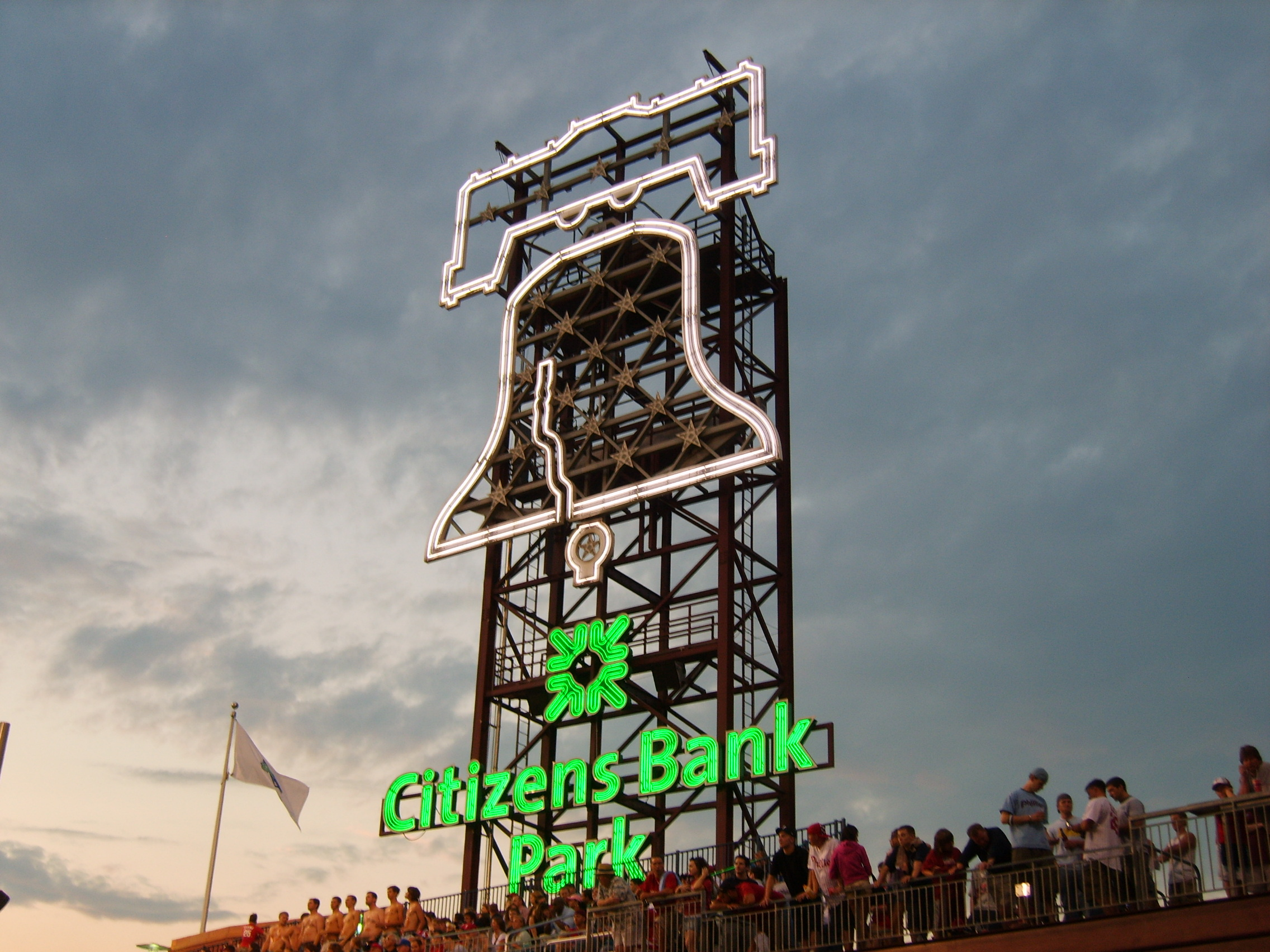
The Liberty Bell replica at Citizens Bank Park rings for every Phillies home run and victory.

The team responded well to the changes. All-Star second baseman Chase Utley was free to bat third, and Ryan Howard batted cleanup; more importantly, they assumed a team leadership role along with shortstop Jimmy Rollins. On August 18, Gillick acquired veteran left-hander Jamie Moyer, a native of the Philadelphia suburb of Souderton, Pennsylvania, for the starting rotation. Immediately afterwards, and following a win over the Washington Nationals on August 29, the Phillies' record stood at 66–65, trailing the San Diego Padres by a mere half game in the wild-card race. By September 24, the Phillies had captured and lost the wild-card lead and were tied with the Los Angeles Dodgers. With identical 82–74 records, both teams took to the road for the final six games, the Phillies to Washington and Florida, the Dodgers to Colorado and San Francisco. On September 30, both the Dodgers and Padres won their respective games and as a result, the Phillies were eliminated from playoff contention while two games behind with only one left to play.

Ryan Howard was named the National League's Most Valuable Player, narrowly edging the St. Louis Cardinals' Albert Pujols to claim the top honor in the National League.

== 2007–2011: NL East dominance ==
=== 2007: 10,000 losses and an incredible regular-season finish ===
The special assistant to the general manager and long-time Phillies coach, John Vukovich, died of brain cancer on March 8, 2007, and was honored on August 10, 2007, by the Phillies organization, which installed a plaque bearing Vukovich's name and accomplishments on the "Wall of Fame" in the Ashburn Alley outfield concourse at Citizens Bank Park. For the 2007 season, the Phillies wore a black circular patch on their right uniform sleeves bearing the letters "VUK" in white.

The Phillies began the 2007 season with a 5–3 home loss on April 2 to the Atlanta Braves after 10 innings. After the first 15 games, the Phillies limped to a 4–11 record, but then found a five-game winning streak to put them back into contention in the National League East. After 40 games, the Phillies finally reached the .500 mark at 20–20.

Heading into the All-Star break, the Phillies split their win–loss record at 44–44, hampered by the loss of starting pitchers Freddy García and Jon Lieber due to injuries that sidelined them for the remainder of the season. They found a bright spot in young pitcher Kyle Kendrick, who rose from the Phillies' AA team in Reading, Pennsylvania to the Phillies starting rotation in 2007.

Three Phillies were named to the 2007 Major League Baseball All-Star Game in San Francisco. Chase Utley was the starting second baseman for the National League squad and center fielder Aaron Rowand was named as a backup (his first All-Star appearance). Starting pitcher Cole Hamels also appeared in his first All-Star Game.

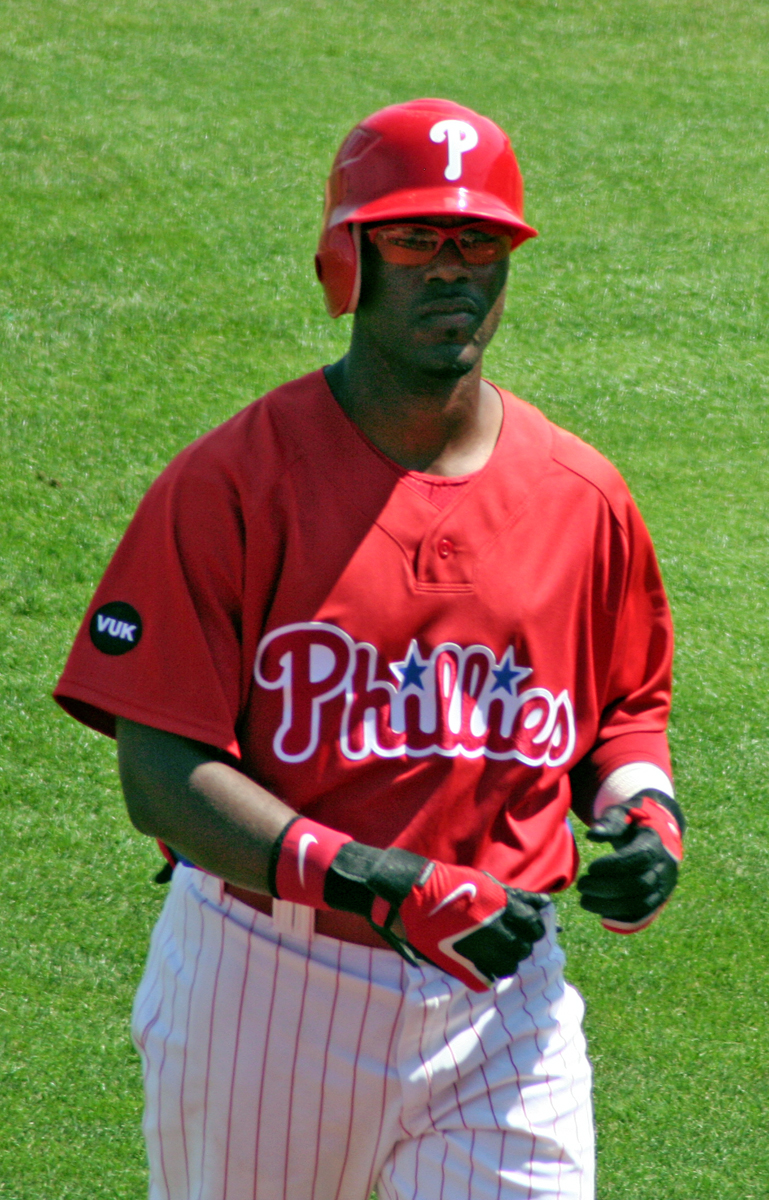
2007 MVP Jimmy Rollins recorded the fourth 20–20–20–20 season in MLB history.

On July 15, 2007, the Phillies lost their 10,000th game, 10–2 to the St. Louis Cardinals on a nationally televised ESPN game. The Phillies became the first North American professional sports franchise to lose 10,000 games.

On September 21, Jimmy Rollins became the first player in major league history to collect 200 hits, 15 triples, 25 home runs, and 25 stolen bases in the same season. Rollins also became the 4th player to have at least 20 home runs, 20 triples, 20 doubles, and 20 stolen bases in a season on September 30, securing the feat on the last day of the season with a sixth-inning RBI triple.

On September 12, the Phillies were seven games behind the New York Mets in the National League East, and it appeared as if their division hopes were dashed. However, the Mets suffered an epic collapse on the likes of the "Phold of 1964", going 4–11 over the next 15 games while the Phillies parried with a strong 12–3 record. The Phillies had defeated the Mets in eight consecutive encounters (between July 1, 2007, and September 16, 2007) and ultimately overtook the Mets by one game on September 28. The Phillies fell back into a first-place tie the following day with a Mets win and a Phillies loss, with only one game remaining in the regular season to decide the champion of the National League Eastern Division.

The Mets would lose their final game of the season. Only minutes later, the Phillies defeated the Washington Nationals, clinching the division for the Phillies for the first time in 14 years. The Phillies won the final game behind 44-year-old Jamie Moyer, who in 1980 had skipped a day of high school to attend that year's Phillies championship parade down Philadelphia's Broad Street.

After their historic comeback, they were swept in three games by the Colorado Rockies after losing 2–1 in Game 3 on October 6, 2007. It was the first time since 1976 that the Phillies were swept in a postseason series.

On November 20, 2007, Jimmy Rollins was named National League MVP, edging out Colorado Rockies left fielder Matt Holliday by 17 votes, making it one of the closest contests since the voting format was adopted in 1938. Along with Ryan Howard's 2006 win, they became the first baseball club with back-to-back MVP winners since the San Francisco Giants's Jeff Kent and Barry Bonds in 2000 and 2001, respectively.

==== 2007–08 offseason: Philly favorites ====
Even though their sweep from the playoffs was a disappointment, the Phillies started on their quest for October baseball in 2008 by trading outfielder Michael Bourn, right-handed pitcher Geoff Geary, and third baseman Michael Costanzo (since traded to the Baltimore Orioles) to the Houston Astros for right-handed pitcher Brad Lidge and infielder Eric Bruntlett. They also re-signed left-handed pitcher J. C. Romero to a three-year deal, in addition to bringing back manager Charlie Manuel and the rest of the coaching staff.

The Phillies signed outfielder Geoff Jenkins to a two-year deal, to be the left-handed part of a platoon with right-handed outfielder Jayson Werth. They also signed outfielder So Taguchi to a one-year deal, as a pinch hitter/backup outfielder. With these new outfielders coming into town, the Phillies sold outfielder Chris Roberson to the Baltimore Orioles. Most recently, the Phillies acquired free-agent third baseman Pedro Feliz, formerly of the San Francisco Giants, inking him to a two-year contract worth $8.5 million. These additions relegated infielder/outfielder Greg Dobbs to a utility role, where he excelled in the previous season as the team's primary left-handed pinch hitter. On February 21, 2008, an arbitrator ruled in Ryan Howard's favor, giving him a $10 million salary for the 2008 season.

Major League Baseball's website also named the Phillies as the favorites for the National League East championship for 2008. Meanwhile, in the wake of the 2007 season and Carlos Beltrán's calling out of the 2008 Phillies' team, the Mets–Phillies rivalry now stood as one of the most intense in baseball.

=== 2008: A second World Series championship ===
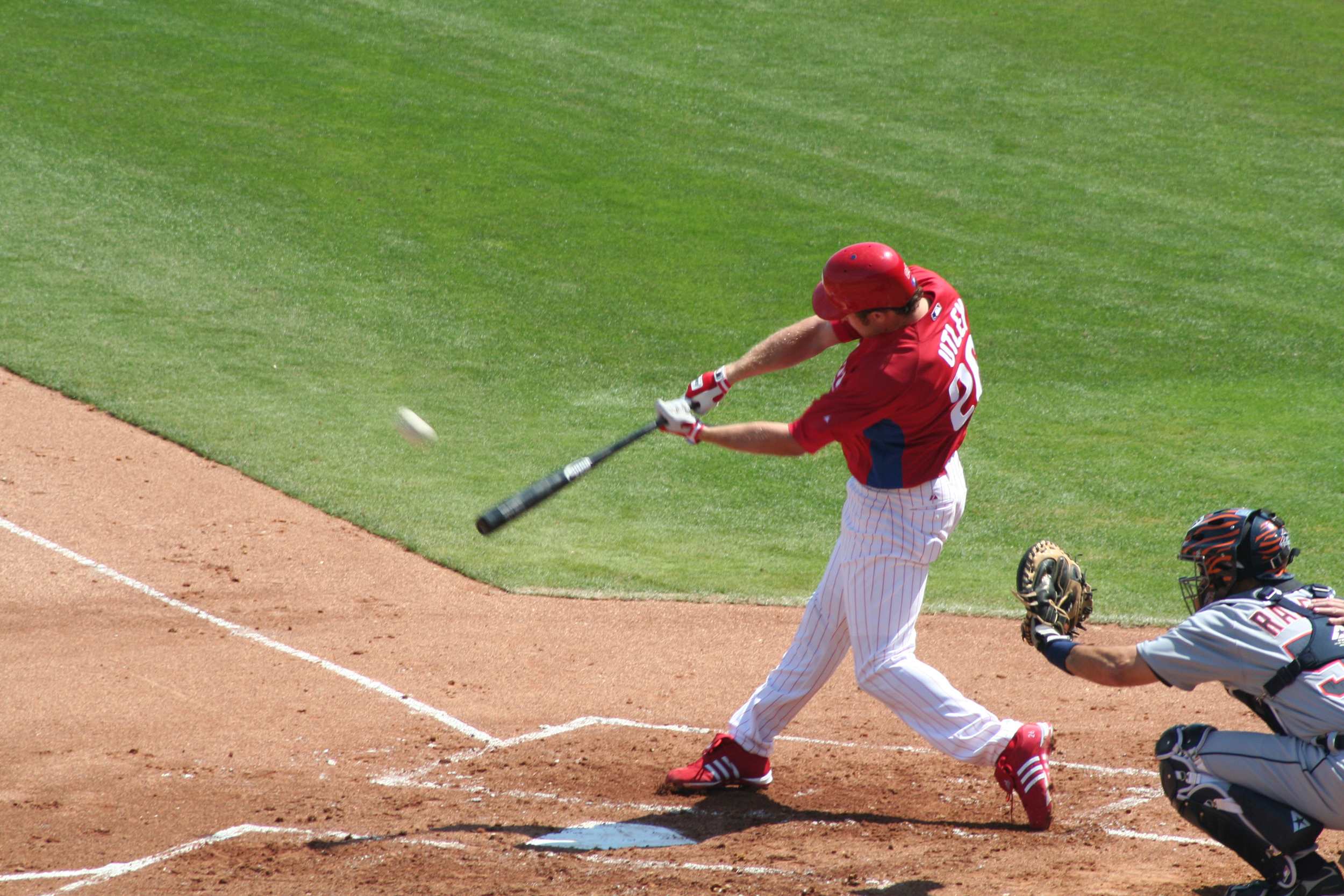
Chase Utley's hot bat powered the Phillies to their first winning April in five years.

Though the Phillies were named in some sources as the favorites to repeat as division champions, they did not get off to the blazing April start that many had hoped for. Still, they managed their first winning opening month since 2003, and only their fourth since their last World Series appearance. With a batting average of .360 and his MLB-leading 11 home runs, Chase Utley paced the team's offense, followed closely by a resurgent Pat Burrell and his 25 runs batted in. Though team speed was hampered by the loss of Shane Victorino and Jimmy Rollins to the disabled list, the latter for the first time in his career, the Phillies still pushed forward to a 15–13 record. The pitching rotation was led by ace Cole Hamels, who led the team in wins (3), ERA (2.70), and innings pitched (43 1/3). Reliever J. C. Romero and new closer Brad Lidge both went the entire month without sacrificing a single run, over 12 1/2 and 11 innings respectively.

Jayson Werth emerged as a valuable asset to the team in the month of May. Expected to be primarily a platoon player coming into the season, Werth showed flashes of the form that once made him such a highly regarded prospect with the Dodgers. While Utley's bat cooled, Werth had a game with three home runs and stole four bases in the month. Unfortunately, as Rollins and Victorino returned, Werth was lost to the disabled list. Ryan Howard broke out of his early-season slump, hitting .245 in May, nearly an 80-point increase from his average in April, and slugging ten home runs. Hometown pitcher Jamie Moyer also became the sixth pitcher in Major League Baseball history to defeat all 30 teams in the league on May 26, in a 20–5 Phillies win over the Colorado Rockies.

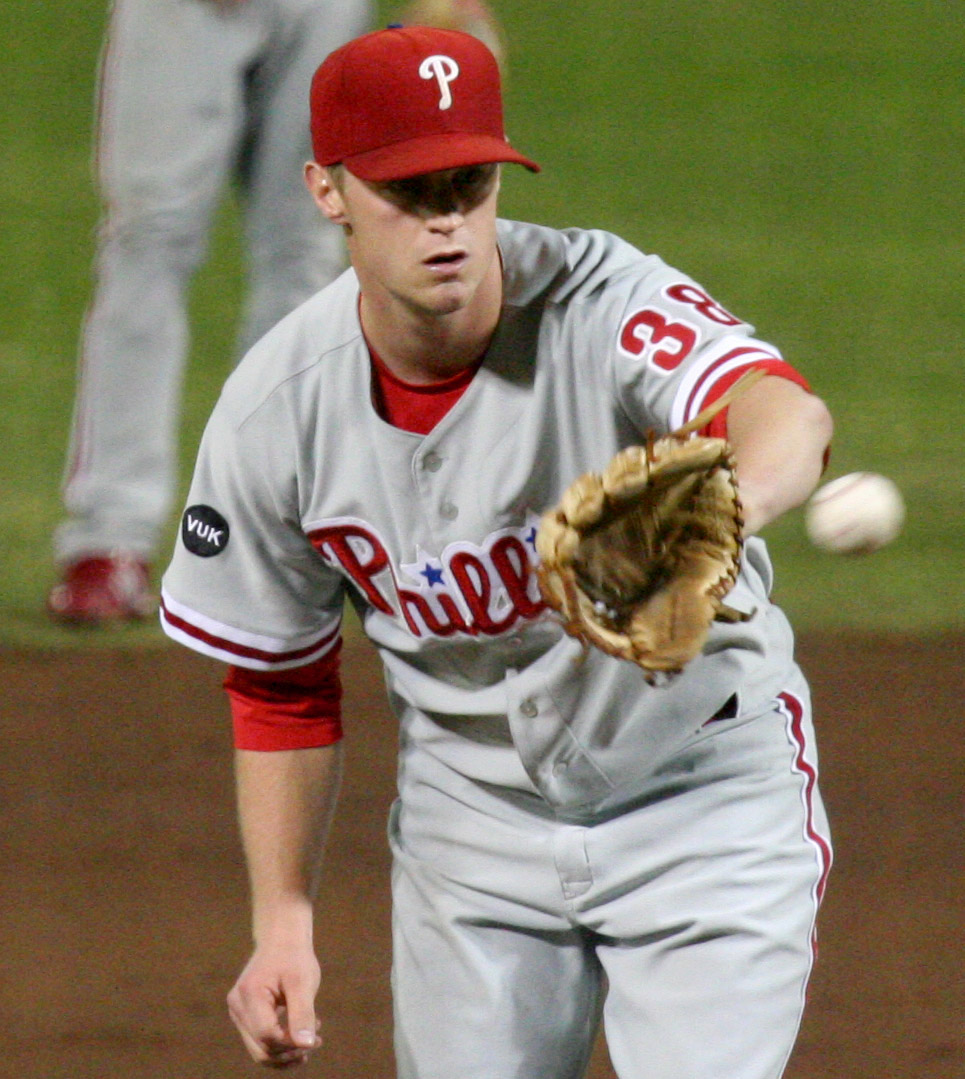
Kyle Kendrick posted a 3–1 record in June 2008.

June was a tale of two halves for the Phillies, as they ended May and started June with a strong run of offense and excellent pitching. From May 26 to June 13, the Phillies posted a 14–4 record, starting their run with a 15–6 win over the Houston Astros and ending with a 20–2 win over the St. Louis Cardinals. However, the offense took a downturn as the Phillies pitchers began to sacrifice more runs in the latter part of the month. The Phillies went 3–11 over the remainder of June, with the pitchers allowing an average of 4.79 runs per game, to the offense's 3.36 runs scored per game. This was punctuated by a season-high 6-game losing streak. The poor records coincided with the Phillies' stretch of interleague play for 2008, as they were swept by the Los Angeles Angels of Anaheim, and lost their series with the Boston Red Sox, Oakland Athletics, and Texas Rangers, in addition to dropping two NL series against the Cardinals and Florida Marlins. While Hamels and Kyle Kendrick each managed to post a 3–1 record in the rotation, the other starters (Moyer, Adam Eaton, and Brett Myers) were not so lucky. Myers' poor performance received arguably the most scrutiny, based on management's decision to move him back to the rotation from the bullpen after the 2007 season. Myers would eventually accept a demotion to AAA Lehigh Valley to work on his confidence and mechanics.

July began with the announcement that Chase Utley and Brad Lidge would represent the team at the 2008 Major League Baseball All-Star Game, with Utley garnering the most votes of all National League players. The Phillies went 8–4 in July before the All-Star break, compiling a four-game win streak, a four-game losing streak, and winning four of their last five. In a move to bolster their starting rotation in preparation for the pennant race, the Phillies traded three minor league players, including second baseman Adrian Cardenas, pitcher Josh Outman, and outfielder Matthew Spencer to the Athletics for starting pitcher Joe Blanton on July 17.

On September 27, the Phillies clinched the National League East for the second year in a row, once again helped by a late September slump from the New York Mets. The Phillies redeemed their previous year's playoff performance by winning the NLDS three games to one against the Milwaukee Brewers, and they defeated the Los Angeles Dodgers in Los Angeles as well, 4–1. As the National League champions, the Phillies advanced to the 2008 World Series to play the Tampa Bay Rays. After a power outage by the offense in which they went 1 for 33 with runners in scoring position and the first-ever suspended postseason game in World Series history in game five, the Phillies rode their pitching rotation to a 4–1 victory in the Fall Classic; Hamels was named the series MVP for both the NLCS and the World Series.

=== 2009: Two straight Series appearances ===
The Phillies posted a second consecutive winning April to open the season with an 11–9 record, but the month was marred by the death of legendary broadcaster Harry Kalas. After opening the month of May against the rival New York Mets, the Phillies met President Barack Obama to celebrate their World Series victory the previous season, and had two rookie pitchers win consecutive starts for the first time since 2007. Starting pitcher Jamie Moyer earned his 250th career win during the month, while first baseman Ryan Howard and outfielder Raúl Ibañez became the first Phillies teammates to hit 10 home runs in the same month. Echoing their strong run in the middle of the 2008 season, the Phillies compiled a 16–4 record in late May and early June, which was countered by weakness during interleague play in late June.

After the team's largest victory of the season (22–1 over the Cincinnati Reds) in early July, five Phillies—Howard, Ibáñez, second baseman Chase Utley, and outfielders Shane Victorino and Jayson Werth—were selected to the All-Star team. July was the team's best showing of the season, as they compiled their first 20-win month since the 2001 season. The Phillies traded for starting pitcher Cliff Lee at the end of the month to bolster their starting rotation, who won his first five starts with the team, and signed free-agent pitcher Pedro Martínez. In August, Eric Bruntlett turned the first game-ending unassisted triple play in National League history, and only the second unassisted triple play in team history. The following month, the team clinched its third consecutive division championship on September 30, becoming the first Phillies team to make a third straight playoff appearance since the 1976–1978 Phillies.

Philadelphia defeated the Colorado Rockies in the National League Division Series (NLDS), 3–1, and the Los Angeles Dodgers in the National League Championship Series (NLCS) for the second consecutive year, 4–1. Howard was named the most valuable player of the NLCS. The Phillies were defeated by the New York Yankees in the 2009 World Series, four games to two.

On December 7, 2009, Baseball America named the Phillies as its Organization of the Year.

On December 9, Chase Utley was named by Sports Illustrated as the second baseman on its MLB All-Decade Team.

On December 22, Sports Illustrated named retired general manager Pat Gillick as number 7 on its list of the Top 10 GMs/Executives of the Decade (in all sports).

=== 2010: Fourth consecutive NL East title ===
After the 2010 season, Jayson Werth left the Phillies to pursue a more-lucrative contract with the Washington Nationals.

One of the highlights of the season occurred on May 29, when Roy Halladay pitched a perfect game, the second in franchise history.

The Phillies finished with a 97–65 record, the best record in major league baseball. In the NLDS, they swept the Cincinnati Reds, 3–0. In Game 1, Halladay's first career postseason start, he hurled a no-hitter, giving up only one walk. It was only the second postseason no-hitter in Major League Baseball history, and the first since Don Larsen's perfect game in the 1956 World Series. The Phillies lost the 2010 National League Championship Series, 4 games to 2, at the hands of the San Francisco Giants, who went on to win their first World Series title since 1954, defeating the Texas Rangers.

Halladay was named the National League's Cy Young Award winner.

=== 2011: Fifth consecutive NL East title ===
In 2011, the Phillies amassed a starting pitching rotation that ESPN referred to as the "best rotation in major league history". This rotation included Roy Halladay, Roy Oswalt, Cliff Lee, Cole Hamels and Joe Blanton. Blanton was sidelined with injury and was replaced with Vance Worley, a AAA pitcher from the Lehigh Valley IronPigs who amassed an 11–3 record in the 2011 season. The Phillies won 14 consecutive games when Worley started, including games where he did not receive the decision.

On August 16, after a two-day delay because of inclement weather, the Phillies, led by Steve Carlton and Jimmy Rollins, and hosted by Phillies public address announcer Dan Baker, unveiled a 7 feet (210 cm) tall bronze statue of Hall of Fame announcer Harry Kalas in the left field side of the Ashburn Alley outfield concourse at Citizens Bank Park, between the Harry the K's restaurant and the center field statue of Kalas' best friend, Richie Ashburn. Privately commissioned and funded entirely by donations by fans, this statue shows Kalas standing cross-legged on top of a home plate, with a microphone in his right hand, which is also on top of a baseball bat, which Kalas is leaning upon. A bronze plaque embedded in the concrete walkway at the foot of the statue carries the originally planned August 14 unveiling date.

The Phillies amassed a 102–60 record, the best in franchise history, and the best regular-season record in MLB in 2011. The previous record of 101–61 was set in both 1976 and 1977. Immediately after the Phillies clinched their division championship in mid-September, while playing several bench players and shuffling their batting order, they suffered an 8-game losing streak, becoming the first team in MLB history to lose 8 straight after winning their division and winning 98 games in a season.

The Phillies eliminated the Atlanta Braves from wild card contention on the last day of the regular season, sweeping a 3-game series against the Braves in Atlanta, erasing an 8 1/2 game lead that the Braves held in the wild card lead as of September 1, 2011. The St. Louis Cardinals caught and surpassed the Braves on the last game of the season, and faced the Phillies in the 2011 National League Division Series, which was tied at 2 games apiece as of October 6, 2011. The Phillies lost the deciding Game 5 at Citizens Bank Park the next night. The Cardinals went on to win their 11th World Series title (most in the National League), defeating the Texas Rangers.

== 2012–2017: Collapse and rebuilding ==
=== 2012: End of streak ===
In the 2011–2012 off-season, the Phillies re-signed Jim Thome and signed closer Jonathan Papelbon and Laynce Nix, as well as obtaining Ty Wigginton via a trade with the Colorado Rockies.

During the season, the Phillies put up a sub-par performance during the early and middle months of the season, and fell into last place for much of the season. The Phillies traded away Shane Victorino, Joe Blanton and Hunter Pence during August, as team management did not see the possibility of reaching the postseason.

In August, not long after the trades, the Phillies caught fire, and finished with an 81–81 record, after being 14 games below .500 at mid-season. The Phillies finished in 3rd place in the NL East, 17 games behind the Washington Nationals and 13 games behind the Atlanta Braves, who went on to win one of the wild card spots. The Phillies finished 7 games out of contention for the wild card.

=== 2013: Struggles continue ===
During the offseason the Phillies did not make a lot of moves in the off-season in hopes of returning to form. The major one was when they acquired Ben Revere from the Twins in exchange for Vance Worley and Trevor May. They struggled throughout the season and never managed a winning record in any months of the season. On August 16, 2013, the Phillies fired Charlie Manuel after posting a 53–67 record. He was replaced by third base coach Ryne Sandberg for the rest of the season as the Phillies ended the season 73–89 and missed the playoffs for the second consecutive year. Many fans criticized the firing of Manuel as they felt the general manager Ruben Amaro Jr. was to blame for not getting enough free agents to help the team on the downturn.

=== 2014: Stagnation ===
After the 2013 season, Roy Halladay retired from baseball and many transactions were made to the Phillies roster. Despite the changes made to the roster, the team still struggled to find any consistency especially on offense. The Phillies would not have a winning record in any month on the season until August where they posted a 14–13 record. The Phillies ended the season 73–89, the same record as the previous year.

=== 2015: Bottom of the league ===
Low expectations were set for the Phillies as they were predicted to be the worst in MLB due to their aging core. Many veteran players on the Phillies were traded away: Jimmy Rollins and Chase Utley were sent to the Los Angeles Dodgers, and Cole Hamels was traded to the Texas Rangers. Cliff Lee would be injured during the season and would become a free agent in 2016. Ruben Amaro Jr. was fired near the end of the season and Ryne Sandberg would resign during the middle of the season. Pete Mackanin would take over as the interim manager of the Phillies. They ended the season with a 63–99 record, the worst in MLB.

=== 2016: Glimmers of hope ===
The Phillies got off to a surprising start during the first quarter of the season when they posted a 22–16 record by mid May. This was due to a dominant pitching rotation with Aaron Nola and Vince Velasquez earning the most praise. This would not last as they would eventually collapse from a promising start to finish 71–91 and miss the playoffs for the fifth consecutive year. Ryan Howard would not be signed again and Carlos Ruiz would be traded removing the last of the original 2008 Phillies core from the roster.

=== 2017: Regression ===
The Phillies would take a step back this season as the pitching and offense remained inconsistent throughout the season. One of the lone bright spots on the team was Rhys Hoskins who was called up from Triple-A as he would hit 18 home runs in just 34 games. The Phillies would regress from the 2016 season to 66–96 and miss the playoffs for the sixth consecutive year. At the end of the season Pete Mackanin stepped down as the head coach of the Phillies and would instead take an office role with the Phillies.

== 2018–2021: Rising up ==
=== 2018: Promising future ===
The Phillies would name Gabe Kapler as the next head coach of the Philadelphia Phillies on October 30, 2017. Kapler was a retired baseball player who last played for the Tampa Bay Rays in 2010. Kapler and the Phillies were surprise contenders in the NL East as they would trade places with the Washington Nationals and the Atlanta Braves. The Phillies would collapse at the end of the season going an abysmal 8–20 in September to end 80–82 and miss the playoffs for the seventh consecutive year.

=== 2019: Major signings ===
Because of the amount of money available for the Phillies to spend, many reporters believed the Phillies would make a lot free agent signings to add onto a promising 2018 season. The Phillies would sign Andrew McCutchen to a three-year deal, trade for Jean Segura and J. T. Realmuto, and sign Bryce Harper to a record setting (at the time as Mike Trout would sign an even bigger contract later in the season) 13-year, $330 million contract. In the first Phillies at bat of the season, Andrew McCutchen hit a home run which would help the Phillies win opening day against the Braves. The Phillies went on to sweep the reigning NL East champs Braves in the first series of the season, and they started 4–0 after routing the Nationals in the fourth game of the season, where Bryce Harper hit his first home run against his former team. While the team started off very well, midseason slumps, injuries suffered by many outfielders and bullpen players, and general underperformance as the season drew to a close led to the team finishing with an 81–81 record, and again missing the playoffs. While the team was showing glimpses of a bright future to come, there were some glaring problems that needed to be addressed. On October 10, 2019, Gabe Kapler was fired as manager of the Phillies.

=== 2020: COVID season ===
The Phillies started the offseason by hiring Joe Girardi as their new manager of the Phillies. The Phillies would address their starting pitching by signing Zack Wheeler to a five-year, $118 million contract. During the offseason they would not resign Maikel Franco and César Hernández making them free agents. To fill the void in the infield, the Phillies would sign shortstop Didi Gregorius to a one-year, $14 million contract. The year was plagued by underperformance, specifically from the bullpen, which, if extended over a full 162 games (the season was shortened due to COVID), would be among the worst bullpens in baseball history. High points of the season included a stretch in which Bryce Harper was in the MVP conversation, and when, after losing consecutive games in which the team had a lead which prompted Harper to say that the team needed to win 9 of 10 games, the team did just that. To close out the season, the Phillies went 2–6, getting swept by the Rays in the final series to miss out on the playoffs. The Phillies lost over 15 games in which they had a lead in the 60-game season.

=== 2021: End of a losing decade ===
Despite a relatively quiet offseason, in 2021 the Phillies had their first winning season since 2011, finishing second in the National League East with an 82–80 record. Bryce Harper was named the National League MVP, leading the league with 42 doubles and a .615 slugging percentage. Zack Wheeler led the National League with 247 strikeouts and finished second in NL Cy Young Award voting. But still the Phillies did not qualified to the playoffs

== 2022-present: Five straight postseason appearances ==
=== 2022: National League pennant ===
After an uneven start to regular season, culminating in Manager Joe Girardi getting fired, the Phillies rallied to an 87-75 win-loss record, and their first postseason appearance in over a decade. They went on to win the National League pennant, beating St. Louis in a Wild Card, Atlanta in the National League Division Series, and San Diego in the NL Championship Series- largely based on excellent pitching starts by Zack Wheeler and Aaron Nola, and the bats of Rhys Hoskins and Bryce Harper. During their playoff run, the organization officially hired then interim manager Rob Thomson as their new manager, removing his interim tag. In the World Series, the Phillies took a 2–1 lead after three games, but were defeated by the Houston Astros in the next three games, ending their underdog success.

=== 2023: Returning to the playoffs ===
After losing in the World Series, the Phillies came back hard as they finished the season 90-72 finishing in the top wild card spot good for 4th seed and second in the National League East. In the Wild Card round they beat the Miami Marlins 2-0, then in the Division round they beat number one seeded division rivals Atlanta Braves, then in the National League Championship they were winning 2-3 over the Diamondbacks only to lose 4-3, ending their playoff run again.

=== 2024: NL East Champions ===
The season was one of the best in recent years finishing 95-67, winning the division, and getting a Wild Card bye. In the division round they face off division rivals New York Mets, the Phillies were also the favorites to win it all, however they lost 3-1, again losing in the playoffs.

== See also ==
- List of Philadelphia Phillies award winners and league leaders
- List of Philadelphia Phillies managers
- List of Philadelphia Phillies opening day starters
- List of Philadelphia Phillies seasons
- List of Philadelphia Phillies team records
