= List of Philadelphia Phillies managers =

In its 138-year history, the Philadelphia Phillies baseball franchise of Major League Baseball's National League has employed 55 managers. The duties of the team manager include team strategy and leadership on and off the field. Of those 52 managers, 15 have been "player-managers"; specifically, they managed the team while still being signed as a player.

The Phillies posted their franchise record for losses in a season during their record-setting streak of 16 consecutive losing seasons (a season where the winning percentage is below .500), with 111 losses out of 154 games in 1941. During this stretch from 1933 to 1948, the Phillies employed seven managers, all of whom posted a winning percentage below .430 for their Phillies careers. Seven managers have taken the Phillies to the postseason, with Danny Ozark and Charlie Manuel leading the team to three playoff appearances. Dallas Green and Charlie Manuel are the only Phillies managers to win a World Series: Green in the 1980 World Series against the Kansas City Royals; and Manuel in the 2008 World Series against the Tampa Bay Rays. Charlie Manuel is the longest-tenured manager in franchise history, with 1,416 games of service over 9 seasons.

The manager with the highest winning percentage over a full season or more was Arthur Irwin, whose .575 winning percentage is fourth on the all-time wins list for Phillies managers. Conversely, the worst winning percentage over a season in franchise history is .160 by the inaugural season's second manager Blondie Purcell, who posted a 13–68 record during the 1883 season.

== Table key ==
WPct	Winning percentage: number of wins divided by number of games managed
PA	Playoff appearances: number of years this manager has led the franchise to the playoffs
PW	Playoff wins: number of wins this manager has accrued in the playoffs
PL	Playoff losses: number of losses this manager has accrued in the playoffs
WS	World Series: number of World Series victories achieved by the manager
† or ‡	Elected to the National Baseball Hall of Fame (‡ denotes induction as manager)
§	Member of the Philadelphia Baseball Wall of Fame

== Managers ==
#^{[a]}	Manager	Years	Wins	Losses	Ties	WPct	PA	PW	PL	WS	Ref
1	Bob Ferguson	1883	4	13	0	.235	—	—	—	—	
2	Blondie Purcell	1883	13	68	1	.160	—	—	—	—	
3	Harry Wright^{†}	1884–1890	409	374	0	.522	—	—	—	—	
4	Jack Clements	1890	13	6	0	.684	—	—	—	—	
5	Al Reach	1890	4	7	0	.364	—	—	—	—	
6	Bob Allen	1890	25	10	0	.714	—	—	—	—	
—	Harry Wright^{†}	1891–1893	227	192	0	.542	—	—	—	—	
7	Arthur Irwin	1894–1895	149	110	0	.575	—	—	—	—	
8	Billy Nash	1896	62	68	0	.477	—	—	—	—	
9	George Stallings	1897–1898	74	104	0	.416	—	—	—	—	
10	Bill Shettsline	1898–1902	367	303	0	.548	—	—	—	—	
11	Chief Zimmer	1903	49	86	0	.363	—	—	—	—	
12	Hugh Duffy^{†}	1904–1906	206	251	0	.451	—	—	—	—	
13	Billy Murray	1907–1909	240	214	0	.529	—	—	—	—	
14	Red Dooin	1910–1914	392	370	0	.514	—	—	—	—	
15	Pat Moran	1915–1918	323	257	0	.557	1	1	4	0	
16	Jack Coombs^{§}	1919	18	44	0	.290	—	—	—	—	
17	Gavvy Cravath^{§}	1919–1920	91	137	0	.399	—	—	—	—	
18	Bill Donovan	1921	25	62	0	.287	—	—	—	—	
19	Kaiser Wilhelm	1921–1922	83	137	0	.377	—	—	—	—	
20	Art Fletcher	1923–1926	231	378	0	.379	—	—	—	—	
21	Stuffy McInnis	1927	51	103	0	.331	—	—	—	—	
22	Burt Shotton	1928–1933	370	549	0	.403	—	—	—	—	
23	Jimmie Wilson	1934–1938	280	477	0	.370	—	—	—	—	
24	Hans Lobert	1938	0	2	0	.000	—	—	—	—	
25	Doc Prothro	1939–1941	138	320	0	.301	—	—	—	—	
—	Hans Lobert	1942	42	109	0	.278	—	—	—	—	
26	Bucky Harris^{‡}	1943	38	52	0	.422	—	—	—	—	
27	Freddie Fitzsimmons	1943–1945	105	181	0	.367	—	—	—	—	
28	Ben Chapman	1945–1948	196	276	0	.415	—	—	—	—	
29	Dusty Cooke	1948	6	6	0	.500	—	—	—	—	
30	Eddie Sawyer	1948–1952	296	292	0	.504	1	0	4	0	
31	Steve O'Neill	1952–1954	182	140	0	.565	—	—	—	—	
32	Terry Moore	1954	35	42	0	.455	—	—	—	—	
33	Mayo Smith	1955–1958	264	282	0	.484	—	—	—	—	
—	Eddie Sawyer	1958–1960	94	131	0	.418	—	—	—	—	
34	Andy Cohen	1960	1	0	0	1.000	—	—	—	—	
35	Gene Mauch	1960–1968	646	684	0	.486	—	—	—	—	
36	Bob Skinner	1968–1969	92	123	0	.428	—	—	—	—	
37	George Myatt	1969	20	35	0	.364	—	—	—	—	
38	Frank Lucchesi	1970–1972	166	233	0	.416	—	—	—	—	
39	Paul Owens^{§}	1972	33	47	0	.413	—	—	—	—	
40	Danny Ozark	1973–1979	594	510	0	.538	3	2	9	0	
41	Dallas Green^{§}	1979–1981	169	130	0	.565	2	9	7	1	
42	Pat Corrales	1982–1983	132	115	0	.534	—	—	—	—	
—	Paul Owens^{§}	1983–1984	128	111	0	.536	1	4	5	0	
43	John Felske	1985–1987	190	194	0	.495	—	—	—	—	
44	Lee Elia	1987–1988	111	142	0	.439	—	—	—	—	
45	John Vukovich^{§}	1988	5	4	0	.555	—	—	—	—	
46	Nick Leyva	1989–1991	148	189	0	.439	—	—	—	—	
47	Jim Fregosi	1991–1996	431	463	0	.482	1	6	6	0	
48	Terry Francona	1997–2000	285	363	0	.440	—	—	—	—	
49	Larry Bowa^{§}^{[b]}	2001–2004	337	308	0	.522	—	—	—	—	
50	Gary Varsho	2004	1	1	0	.500	—	—	—	—	
51	Charlie Manuel^{§}	2005–2013	780	636	0	.551	5	27	18	1	
52	Ryne Sandberg^{†}	2013–2015	119	159	0	.428	—	—	—	—	
53	Pete Mackanin	2015–2017	174	238	0	.422	—	—	—	—	
54	Gabe Kapler	2018–2019	161	163	0	.497	—	—	—	—	
55	Joe Girardi	2020–2022	132	141	0	.484	—	—	—	—	
56	Rob Thomson	2022–2026	355	270	0	.568	4	20	14	0	
57	Don Mattingly	2026–present	79	55	0	.590	1	1	2	0	

Statistics current through October 7, 2026

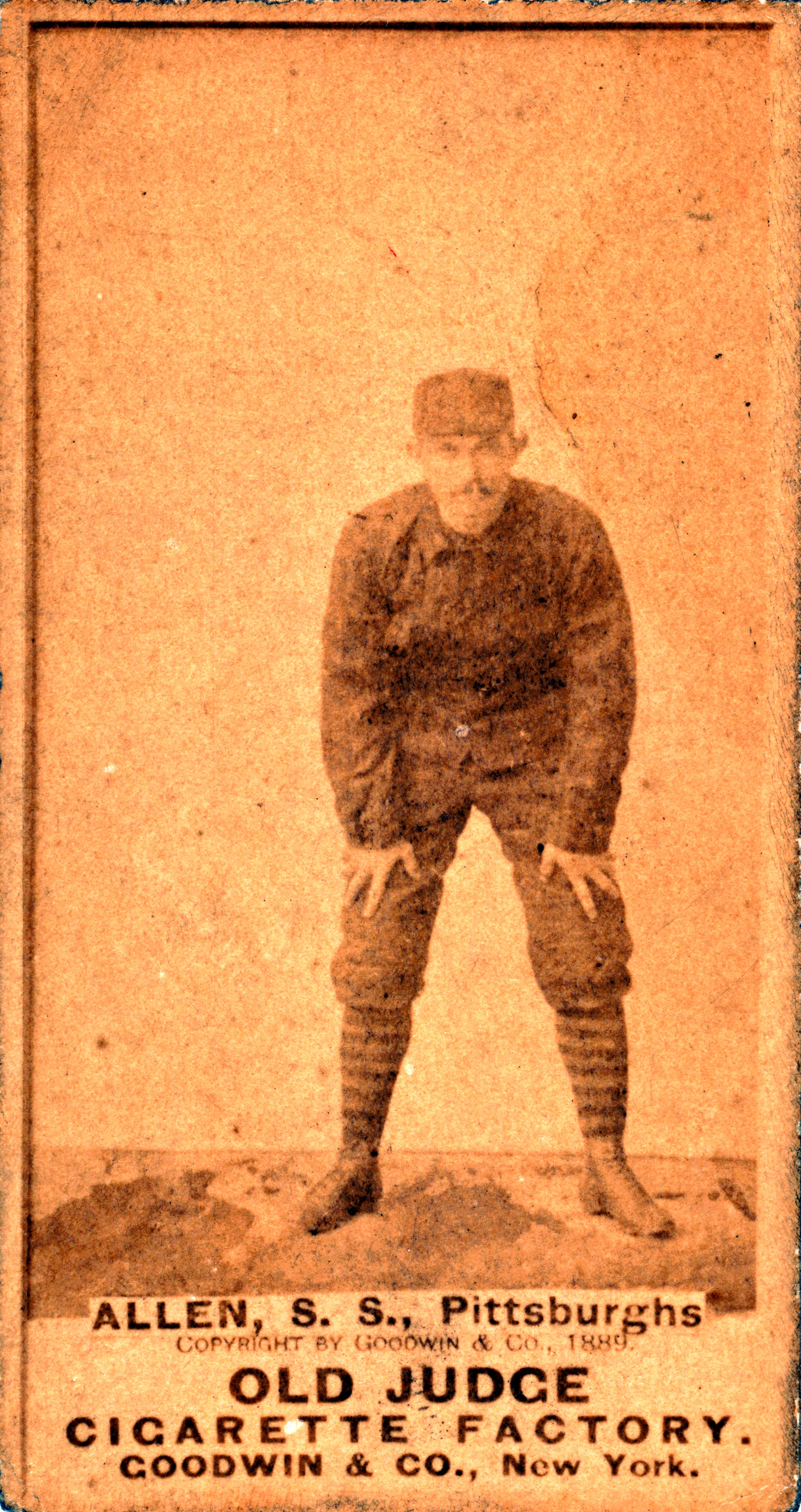
Bob Allen, manager, 1890

Hugh Duffy, manager, 1904–1906

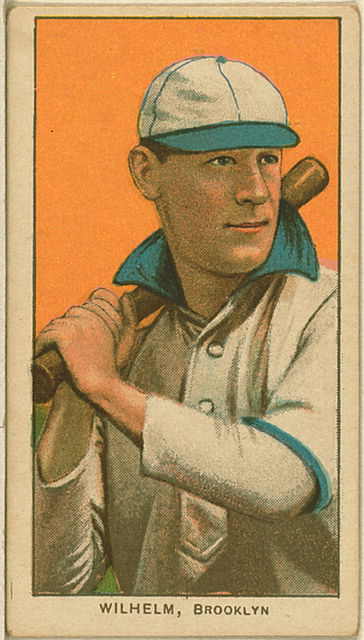
Kaiser Wilhelm, manager, 1921–1922

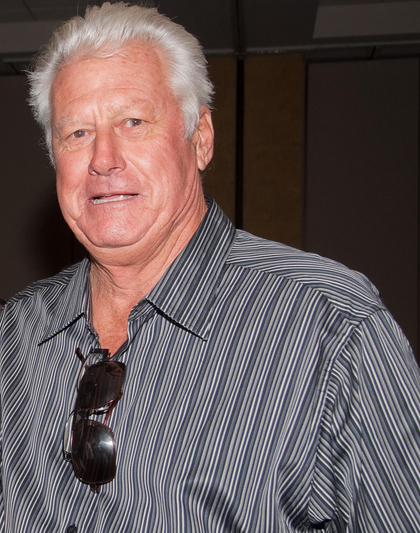
Dallas Green became the Phillies manager in 1979 to 1981, and won the 1980 World Series.

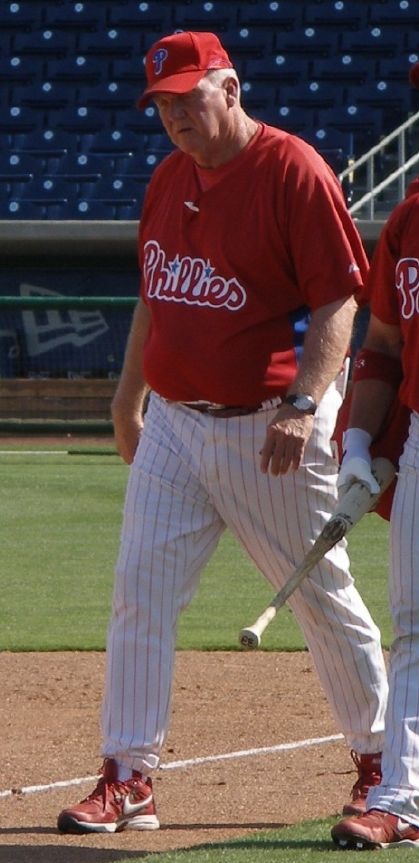
Charlie Manuel, managed from 2005–2013, and won the 2008 World Series

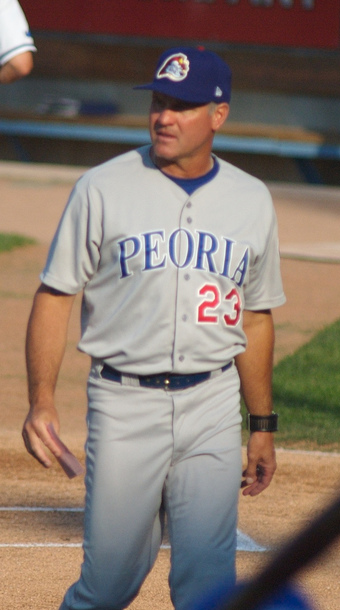
Ryne Sandberg managed the Phillies from 2013 to 2015.

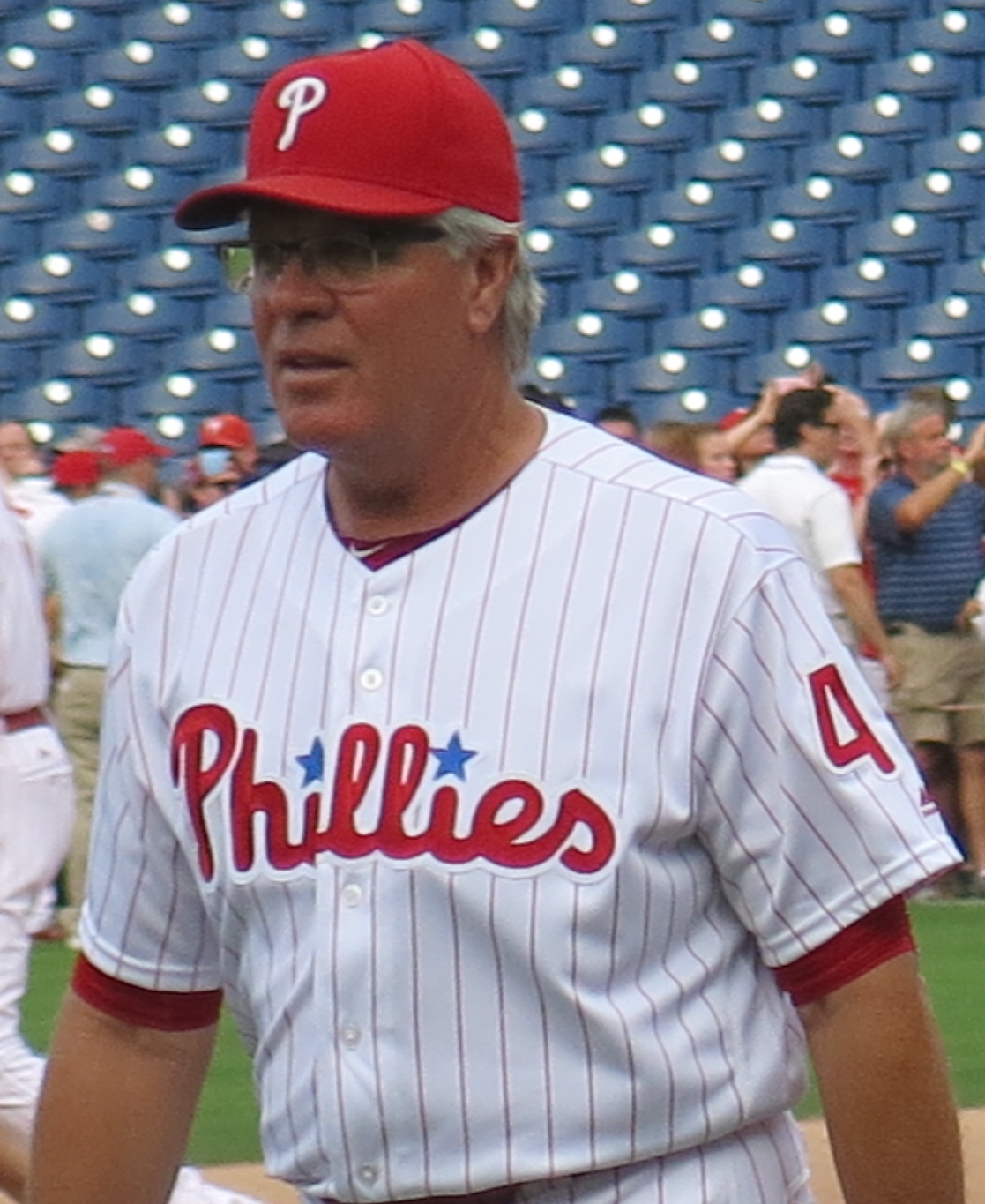
Pete Mackanin was the Phillies manager from 2015 to 2017.

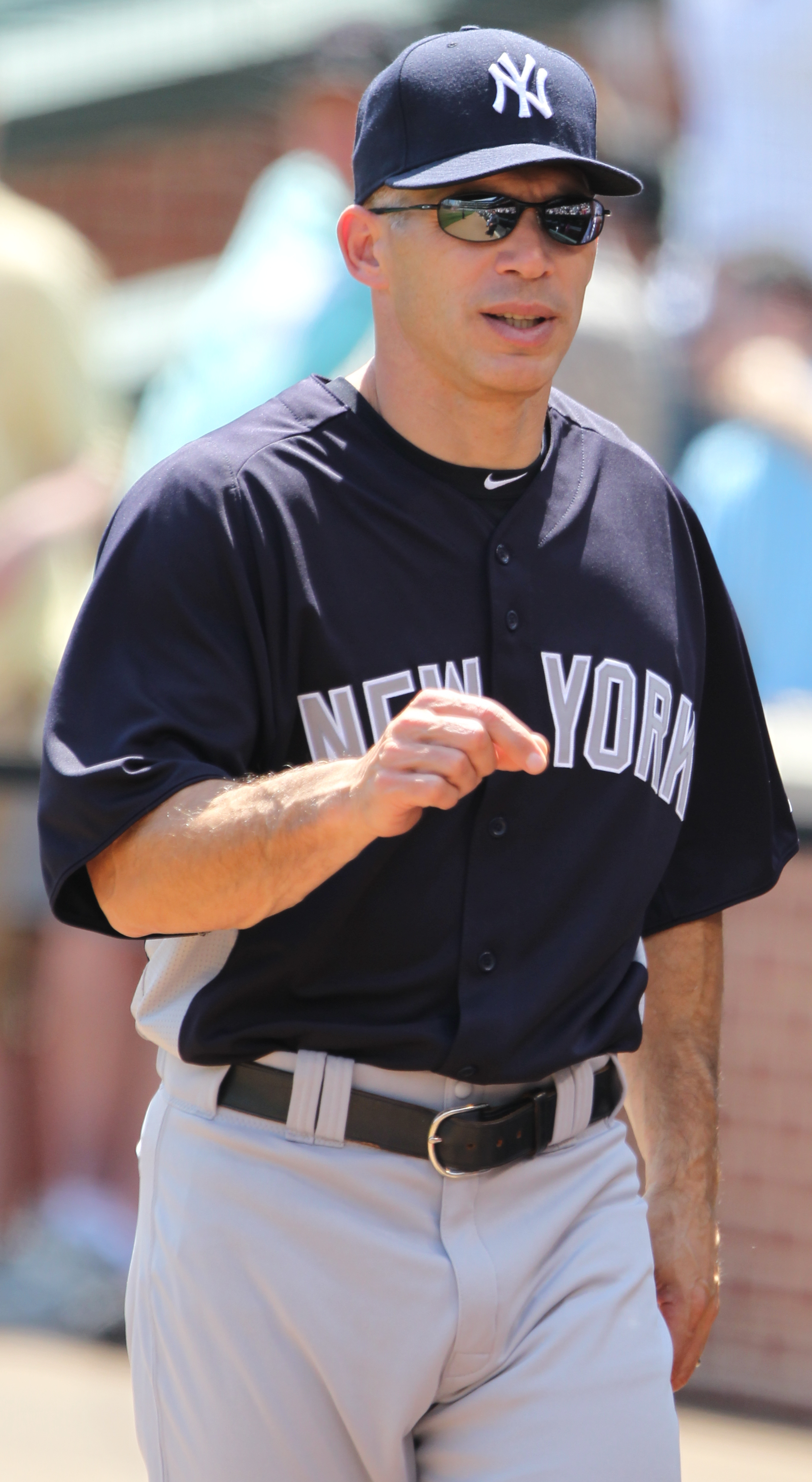
Joe Girardi was the manager of the Phillies from 2020 to 2022.

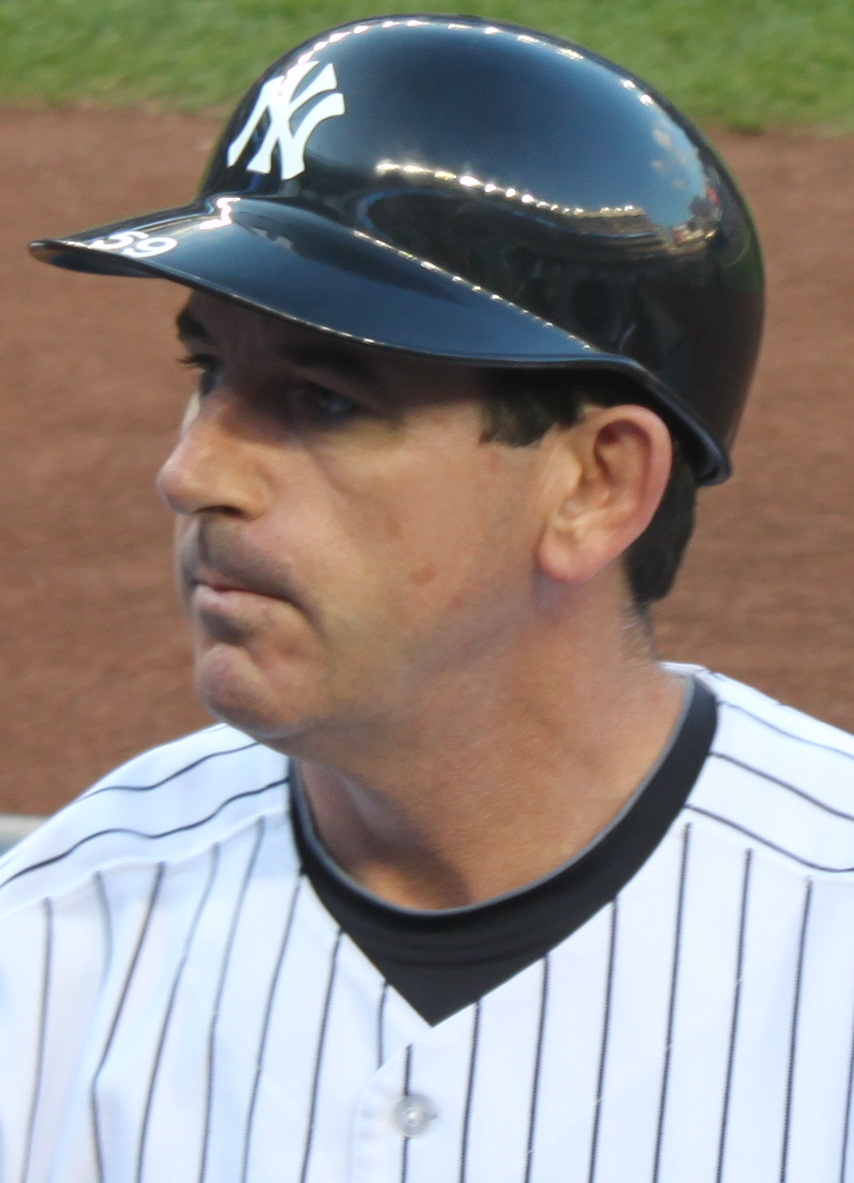
Rob Thomson was the manager of the Phillies from 2022 to 2026.

== Footnotes ==
- ^{a} #: A running total of the number of Phillies' managers. Thus, any manager who has two or more separate terms is only counted once.
- ^{b} Larry Bowa won the Manager of the Year Award in 2001.

== See also ==
- List of Philadelphia Phillies owners and executives, including general managers
