= Charlie Ruch =

Owner of the Phillies baseball team

Lewis Charles Ruch (1862 – August 30, 1937) was the owner and president of the Philadelphia Phillies from 1930 to 1932.

In 1913, former New York City police commissioner William Baker had a problem. He had joined a group headed by his cousin William H. Locke, that had agreed in principle to buy the Phillies from Charles Phelps Taft. However, several of the Locke/Baker group's partners had pulled out at the last minute, leaving them short of cash. Baker called Ruch, an old friend of his from New York City who was an outdoor advertising executive, and asked him to join the syndicate. Ruch agreed, and became team vice president when Locke's death made Baker president and principal owner. He kept the vice presidency even after health issues forced him into semi-retirement in 1920.

When Baker died in 1930, speculation abounded that the Phillies would be sold; one of the most notable suitors was Ty Cobb. However, Baker's will barred any attempt to sell the team. Reluctantly, Ruch was persuaded to come out of semi-retirement. He was formally elected team president on January 5, 1931. Despite his precarious health, he took an active role in running a team that had sunk to the bottom of the National League. A mere three years after going to the 1915 World Series, the Phillies had crashed to sixth place and had not had a winning record since.

Ruch endeared himself to the fans by moving from Brooklyn to Philadelphia. The fans had long been rankled at Baker's mostly absentee ownership; he'd kept his primary home in New York City. He also promised to be with the team from spring training through the end of the season, and promised to "do everything possible to bring about a winning club." True to his word, he persuaded slugger Chuck Klein to end a holdout that lasted through all of spring training, signing him to a $45,000 contract, a tidy sum by Phillies standards of the time.

Under Ruch's watch, the Phillies rose to sixth place in 1931 after finishing last in four of the past five seasons. They rose to fourth in 1932. As it turned out, this would be their only first division finish, and their only winning record, from 1918 to 1948. After the 1932 season, Ruch's doctor persuaded him to retire for good. He was succeeded by team business manager Gerald Nugent, who had already been handling the Phillies' day-to-day operations for some time.

Ruch retired to his winter home in Miami, and died there in 1937 at the age of 75.

== See also ==
- Philadelphia Phillies
- John Middleton
