= Gerald Nugent =

American baseball executive (1892–1970)

Gerald P. Nugent
- Born: Gerald Paul Nugent; October 25, 1892; Philadelphia, Pennsylvania, U.S.
- Died: November 25, 1970 (aged 78); Philadelphia, Pennsylvania, U.S.
- Occupation: Merchant
- Known for: Owner of the Philadelphia Phillies, 1931–1942
- Spouse: Mae Mallen (m. 1925)

Gerald Paul Nugent, Sr. (October 25, 1892 – November 25, 1970) was an American baseball executive. He was the owner of the Philadelphia Phillies baseball team of the National League from 1932 through 1942.

A Philadelphia native, Nugent graduated from Northeast High School, where he excelled at football and baseball. He became a leather goods merchant after graduating, and earned two citations for bravery during World War I.

In the early 1920s, Nugent met longtime Phillies secretary Mae Mallen. Through Mallen, Nugent was introduced to longtime Phillies owner William Baker, who was so impressed with Nugent's baseball acumen that he hired Nugent as an assistant in 1925. Nugent and Mallen were married soon afterward. Nugent rose fast in the organization, becoming business manager in 1926 and a board member in 1928. His biggest catch was purchasing Chuck Klein's minor league contract.

Baker died in 1930, leaving 700 of his shares in the Phillies to his widow and 500 to Mae Nugent. He was succeeded as team president by Charlie Ruch, who left most day-to-day operations in Nugent's hands. Ruch retired on the advice of his doctor in 1932, and Nugent was elected team president with the support of Baker's widow. Baker's widow died in 1932, leaving her shares to Mae Nugent and her son, Gerald Jr. Combined with his own stock, Gerald Sr. now effectively had a 51 percent controlling interest in the Phillies. Mae Nugent became a team vice president, the first female senior executive in the National League.

Nugent had inherited a team that had risen to fourth place in 1932 with a 78-76 record, the only time that the Phillies finished with a winning record between 1918 and 1948. However, even with his income from his other businesses, he did not have the financial means to build on that success. He was forced to trade what little talent the team had to make ends meet, and had to use some creative financial methods to be able even to field a team at all.

Unlike the notoriously miserly Baker, Nugent cared more about winning than saving money. For example, he devoted some effort to player development for the first time in the history of the franchise, and was well known for spotting obscure talent. However, for most of his tenure as owner, his debts almost always exceeded his income. In one year, he had to pledge his own stock as collateral to keep the team alive. On at least one other occasion, he had to pay a debt out of his own salary. Nugent's keen eye for talent allowed him to discover a number of fine young players, but he was often forced to sell or trade them out of town in order to balance the books. While the cash from the trades helped the Phillies stay in business, they didn't help the on-field product. His tenure saw four of the seven worst seasons in franchise history. This included five consecutive seasons in which they finished dead last in the National League while losing 100 games.

One notable step Nugent took, in mid-season 1938, was to abandon Baker Bowl, the club's home since 1885. He had tried several times over the years to get out of his lease with the estate of Charles Webb Murphy, and only succeeded when he threatened to go to court. Nugent agreed to pay the Murphy estate to "suspend" the lease for five years, clearing the way for the Phillies to move five blocks west as tenants of the American League Athletics at Shibe Park. Even after the move, there were times when crowds could be counted in the hundreds.

Nugent finally reached the end of his rope in 1942. A year after posting a 43–111 record, the worst in franchise history, the Phillies needed an advance from the league just to be able to go to spring training. The team shortened its name to the "Phils" because the Bayuk Cigar Company objected to the baseball team sharing the name of its Phillies cigars. The name change wasn't enough to reverse the Phils' fortunes, and they finished 42-109.

By the end of that season, Nugent was over $300,000 in debt, and was two years behind in rent to the A's. He was also feeling pressure from his fellow National League owners; even after the move to Shibe Park, the Phils' attendance figures were too meager for visiting teams to meet their expenses. Realizing that there was no way he could operate the team in 1943, he reached an agreement in principle that February to sell the team to Bill Veeck, who planned to bring in Negro league stars in an effort to turn the moribund franchise around. However, when Baseball Commissioner Kenesaw Mountain Landis, an intractable opponent of integration, got wind of it, he pressured National League President Ford Frick to quash the deal and take over the team. A week later, the league sold the Phillies to lumber broker William D. Cox.

This story was initially refuted by a 1998 article in the Society for American Baseball Research's The National Pastime, which argued that Philadelphia's black press made no mention of a sale to Veeck. However, new evidence has surfaced that suggested Nugent did indeed plan to sell the Phillies to Veeck.
