= List of fatal dog attacks =

This is a list of human deaths caused by dogs in reverse chronological order, which have been documented through news media, reports, cause-of-death statistics, scientific papers, or other sources. For additional information on causes of death and studies related to fatalities resulting from dog bites or attacks, see Fatal dog attacks.

== North America ==
=== Canada ===
See: List of fatal dog attacks in Canada

=== United States of America ===
See: Fatal dog attacks in the United States

=== Mexico ===
Date	Victim	Dog type (Number)	Circumstances
August 15, 2026	El Flaco, 30, male	Pit bull	Mexico City, Indios Verdes — The victim approached a dog tied to a pole and was attacked.
March 22, 2026	Evarista González Jiménez, 75, female	Pit bull	Nayarit, Tecuala, Mancilla neighborhood — She was attacked in her home and did not survive the severe injuries to her face and neck.
January 5, 2026	5, male	Pit bull	Zacatecas, Fresnillo, Francisco Villa neighborhood — The child was attacked by the father's dog and died on the way to hospital.
April 15, 2025	José F.R.H, male	Pit bull	Durango, Vicente Guerrero — The man was attacked in the street. The dog bit off his hand and parts of his foot. The victim died in a hospital.
September 2, 2024	Isabel, 35, female	Pit bull (2)	Zacatecas, Jesús González Ortega — The woman was home alone and attacked by her 2 dogs.
September 1, 2024; September 28 †	Isidra Torres Hernández, 52, female	Pit bull (3)	Oaxaca, Santa Lucia del Camino, San Francisco Tutla — She was attacked by loose dogs when she left her house. Due to the severity of her injuries, both of her arms had to be amputated.
August 19, 2024	Marina Solis Carmona, 62, female	Pit bull	Chihuahua, Hidalgo del Parral — The dog escaped from its property and attacked the woman, who was passing by. She was bitten on multiple parts of her body, but the most severe injuries were on her head. Hypovolemic shock was listed as the cause of death. The victim's family pardoned the dog's owner and the dog will not be put down.
August 18, 2024	Amparo, 84, female	Unknown	Baja California, Tijuana — A woman was killed in a park by dogs.
July 16, 2024	Melisa Monserrat, 4, female	Pit bull	Colima, Tecomán — The girl was outside her home and was attacked by a dog. She was taken to the hospital but died.
April 21, 2024	Liam, 2, male	Pit bull	Jalisco, Tuxpan — The boy left his home unnoticed and approached a tied up dog. The father found the boy unconscious with injuries to his face and neck.
April 14, 2024	Yuridiam Elodia, 36, female	German Shepherd (2)	Baja California, San Felipe — She walked by a property and was attacked by two escaped guard dogs.
March 1, 2024	39 or 40, male	Unknown (5)	Baja California, Tijuana — A man was killed by a pack of 5 dogs.
February 3, 2024	Mina, 48, female	Unknown (Pack)	Baja California, San Felipe, Pai Pai Camp — A tourist from the United States was attacked by a pack of dogs at the beach. Her death is investigating as homicide by animal.
January 26, 2024	Rosa Velia Gutiérrez Salas, 82, female, and Armando Torres González, 76, male	Pit bull	Coahuila, Torreón, Nueva Aurora colony — A couple lost their lives due to an attack of their dog. They had the dog since it was a puppy. According to the authorities, the woman ended up with a detached lower limb and various injuries to her body, while her husband had various bites on his face and body. Both deaths were caused by the bites, as the two deceased had hypovolemic shock, acute external bleeding, bronco aspiration, as well as sharp wounds both in the skull, faces, neck and limbs. One week before the fatal attack the dog already attacked the woman.
August 27, 2023	60, female	Unknown (1+)	Hidalgo, Tepetitlán — The woman was attacked on her property and died at the scene.
August 7, 2023	Pánfilo SZ, 54, male	Pit bull	Oaxaca, Salina Cruz — A man in a wheelchair was fatally attacked by a Pit Bull.
April 2023	R.G.V., 68, female	Unknown (1+)	Hidalgo, Atitalaquia, Tlamaco —The 68-year-old was found dead with multiple bite wounds.
May 26, 2023	GCGV, 4, male	Pit bull (3)	Chihuahua, Temósachic — The boy was playing with other children outside when he was attacked. He died on the way to the hospital.
October 2, 2020	Felipe Haro Loera, 87, male	Pit bull	Baja California, Mexicali Valley — A man was killed by his neighbor's dog.
October 3, 2020	Felipe Haro Loera, 60, male	Pit bull	Mexico City, Venustiano Carranza — The dog owner found his neighbor lying on the ground after he was attacked by his dog named "Junior".
May 22, 2020	Celina Clemente García, 74, female	Pit bull	Mexico City, Condesa — The woman was alone with her employer's dog when it attacked her.
July 1, 2019	Dominc Enot Vilchis Gutiérrez, <2 years, male	Pit bull	Mexico City, Iztapalapa — The victim was attacked and killed by a pit bull that was kept tied up on a roof. The victim died on the scene. The dog was taken into custody.
January 21, 2018	<1, male	Pit bull	Colima, Las Amarillas Colony — An 11-month-old baby was attacked by 1 of 3 pit bulls in his home. Due to the severe injuries and blood loss, the minor died minutes after arriving at the hospital.
July 19, 2017	3, female	Pit bull (2)	Mexico City, Coyoacán, San Pablo Tepetlapa — The girl was killed by two dogs. The parents rented parts of their property to the dog owner.
July 17, 2015	Matias Reynoso, 1, male	Pit bull (2)	Guanajuato, Arboledas de San Hilarión — The child was attacked by his parents' fighting dogs. He suffered serious injuries to his face, neck and chest and died at the hospital.
August 2014	Zoé Villar, 4, female	Rottweiler (2)	Nuevo Léon, Lampazos — The 4-year-old was attacked at a relative's house. Her 7-year-old sister was severely injured.

=== Central America ===
Belize
Date	Victim	Dog type (Number)	Circumstances
April 2018	Claire Alamilla, 11, female	Unknown (1)	Belize, Belama, Albert Hoy Street — She tried to save her poodle from an attack and was attacked herself. A passerby tried to save the child. The dog was euthanized. The dog owner was acquitted in 2019.
June 28, 2014 †	McKesson Garrett, 71, male	Rottweiler (4)	Belize, Belize District, Belize City — The 71-year-old was attacked by 4 dogs on his birthday in the presence of his friend and dog owner. He suffered severe injuries to his hands, arms, legs, and foot. He was taken to the Karl Heusner Memorial Hospital. He died 2 months later at the hospital.
June 28, 2014	Jeffrey O’Brien, 23, male	Pit bull (2) Unknown (1)	Belize, Independence — The 23-year-old fisherman was riding his bicycle to go home from work when 3 dogs came out of an unfenced yard and attacked him. He tried to fend them off with a paddle until it broke.
August 17, 2009	Dualvin Jerardo Jacinto Albeno or Dualvin Salinas, 7, male	Rottweiler (2)	Belize, Cayo, Santa Elena —Two boys went into a neighbors yard to collect coconuts and were charged by 2 dogs named King and Queen. One boy could escape, the other one died at the scene.
May 31, 2010 June 2010 †	Edmund Spain, 65, male	Pit bull (2)	Belize, Belize District, Tropical Park area of Hattieville — The 65-year-old was walking towards his house when his neighbor's dogs escaped under the fence and attacked him. He died 5 days later. The dog owner was charged with causing death by negligence, but was acquitted in 2015 due to lack of evidence.

Guatemala
Date	Victim	Dog type (Number)	Circumstances
April 20, 2024	Danilo Emanuel Valladares, 6, male	Unknown	Guatemala, San Andrés Itzapa, Chimaltenango — The dogs that attacked the child belonged to the employer of the child's parents.
August 23, 2023	Manuel Hernández Matul, 56, male	Unknown	Guatemala, Chocruz area, San Francisco El Alto, Totonicapán — Matul was attacked in the early morning hours. He suffered deep wounds to his face, legs and arms. The wounds were large, as the dog(s) ripped out skin and muscles almost completely. A person returning from work saw the body and alerted authorities.
July 28, 2023	Francisco Cristobal Osorio Garcia, 7, male	Pit bull	Guatemala, Chuilajú, La Pedrera, Xela, on the outskirts of the Altense city. — The boy played near his home and was attacked and killed. Hypovolemic shock and polytraumatism were listed as cause of death.
March 2023	Mateo Lucas Salvador, 42, male	Malinois (3), Cane Corso (1)	Guatemala / United States — Salvador worked for the owner of the dogs and was attacked while the owner was away.
March 2, 2022	70, female	Pit bull (2)	Guatemala, El Granizo — Neighbors alerted emergency services that a woman was attacked by dogs. Together they managed to separate the dogs from the victim, but she did not survive her severe injuries.
October 29, 2019	Emily Adriana Julaj Ávila, 1, female	Pit bull	Guatemala — She was attacked by a dog named Zeus.

Nicaragua
Date	Victim	Dog type (Number)	Circumstances
July 25, 2026	Bayardo Morales Burgos, 34, male	Pit bull	Managua Department — He was bit in his leg and died at a hospital.
January 26, 2024	Julia Bertha Rios Tercero, 60, female	Pit bull (2)	Chinandega Department, El Viejo — She was feeding her dogs when they attacked and killed her.
January 1, 2024	Augusto José García, 21, male	Rottweiler (5)	Managua Department, Managua — García forgot his keys and climbed a wall to his property. His dogs attacked and killed him.
December 27, 2023	Ana Rosa Aguilera Blandón, 83, female	Pit bull	Grenada Department, Grenada — She was attacked by her dog in the early hours of the morning as she walked onto the patio of her home. After hearing screams of despair and pain, neighbors tried to help her. It took them a while to get to the severely injured woman and bring her to the hospital. She succumbed to her injuries.
November 1, 2022 November 5 †	María de los Ángeles Valdez Picado, 60, female	Pit bull (4)	Masaya Department, Masaya, Santa Teresa neighborhood — She was attacked at home and suffered severe injuries to her face. She died after four days in hospital. The dogs belonged to her brother-in-law and were euthanized.
November 30, 2020	Ana Rosa García Parrales, 65, female	Pit bull	Carazo Department, Diriamba — She was feeding her dog when, for unknown reasons, it attacked her, biting her on the neck and face. She was rushed to Hospital El Maestro, where the doctors confirmed she had died from hypovolemic shock.

Other Central American countries
Date	Victim	Dog type (Number)	Circumstances
March 17, 2026	Doris Aleida Fuentes Villatoro, 55, female	Pit bull (3)	Honduras, La Ceiba — She was visiting her sister when she was attacked by her sister's dogs. Firefighters managed to drive the attacking dogs away using high-pressure hoses. She died a few days later in the hospital.
December 2024	5, female	Pit bull	Panama, Kuna Nega — The girl ran after a ball into a yard and was attacked.
July 15, 2024	Óscar Alexander Ochoa Rodríguez, 35, male	Pit bull	Honduras, Tegucigalpa — When the man entered his house, he took out his belt and began hitting his dog with it. The dog reacted and attacked the man, killing him. His father had to put down the dog, because it would not let go of his corpse.
June 13, 2022	Jana Mejía, 3, female	Pit bull	Panama, Chepo District, Union of Azuero, Chichebre — The 3-year-old was attacked by a dog and died at the hospital.
June 8, 2022	Alisson Nahomy Argueta, 7, female	American Pit Bull Terrier	Honduras, Lempira Department, Lepaera — The girl was attacked by the family dog. She was taken to a medical center, where, hours later, she succumbed to her injuries.
January 28, 2019	<1, female	American Staffordshire Terrier	Costa Rica, San José, Tibás — The 11-month-old child crawled into the garage where the dog was kept. The dog attacked the child and she died from severe injuries to the head. Her parents were investigated for breach of parental authority (negligence) and faced possible prison time.
July 28, 2015	Alison Esmeralda Gonzales, 1, female	Rottweiler (2)	Honduras, San Pedro Sula — The girl was attacked and killed by the two dogs owned by the family. The great-grandmother was also severely injured. The great-grandfather tried to scare away the dogs with a machete and was also attacked and suffered minor injuries.

=== Caribbean ===
Dominican Republic
Date	Victim	Dog type (Number)	Circumstances
March 6, 2016	6, male	Unknown	Santo Domingo — The 6-year-old was attacked by a relative's dog. He arrived at the Santiago clinic in a state of shock and was admitted to intensive care but did not survive.
April 16, 2014	Juan Antonio García Alvarado, 3, male	Pit bull (3)	Samaná, Las Terrenas — The boy suffered fatal injuries to the head, face and neck when he was attacked at his mother's place of work. His mother suffered a deep wound to the neck when she tried to rescue her son and needed intensive care.

Trinidad and Tobago
Date	Victim	Dog type (Number)	Circumstances
August 24, 2022	Rachel Bhagwandeen, 11, female	American Bulldog	Trinidad, San Fernando, Vistabella — The 11-year-old was watching television together with her brother when a dog entered the house and attacked the children. She protected her brother and was severely injured and died at the scene.
September 12, 2021	Amaziah Lewis of San Juan, 4, male	Rottweiler	Trinidad, East–West Corridor, Tacarigua — The child was with his grandmother. She was cleaning the yard and the boy followed her. One of the dogs broke free of its kennel and attacked and killed the child.
January 19, 2021	Gaytrie Chanderpaul, 56, female	Rottweiler	Trinidad, Tunapuna–Piarco, D'Abadie —The victim was giving the family dog a treat when it attacked.
March 23, 2014	Sylvia Roberts, 83, female	Pit bull (3)	Trinidad, Tunapuna–Piarco, Tunapuna — She was in her yard talking to the postman when her son's dogs attacked her.
August 26, 2013	Lillian Bunsee, 84, female	Pit bull	Trinidad, Tunapuna–Piarco, Maraval, La Seiva Road — The 84-year-old was attacked by a female dog on her property. A 32-year-old relative of the victim was arrested after the fatal attack.
August 23, 2011	Jessie Boiselle, 11, male	Pit bull	Trinidad, Tunapuna–Piarco, Maraval, Clovis Trace —The boy was killed by the family dog named Damian.
May 8, 2011	Denise Rackal, 46, female	Pit bull (4–7)	Trinidad, Chaguanas — She was on her way to work when she was attacked by dogs belonging to a police officer. The dogs had a history of aggression.
April 8, 2011	King, Adult, male	Rottweiler (2)	Trinidad, San Juan–Laventille, San Juan — King entered a property to pick limes and was attacked by 2 dogs.
1995 to 2000	5 people		Trinidad and Tobago

Other Caribbean countries
Date	Victim	Dog type (Number)	Circumstances
October 5, 2022	3, male	Pit bull	Saint Kitts and Nevis, Gingerland — A 3-year-old was attacked and killed by one of several dogs chained up in his back yard.

== South America ==
=== Argentina ===
Date	Victim	Dog type (Number)	Circumstances
October 18, 2024	Fabio Raúl Carrizo, 36, male	Pit bull	Buenos Aires, Ranelagh — The man was attacked and killed by his dog on his farm.
September 5, 2024	Noemí Duran, 82, female	Pit bull (2)	Mendoza, General Alvear — Duran was attacked by a relative's two dogs. She died shortly after arriving at the hospital.
July 4, 2024 July 9, 2024 †	26, male	Pit bull	Jujuy, San Pedro de Jujuy — The man was trying to prevent the dog from escaping into the street when it lunged and bit him on the leg and neck. He was taken to Hospital Guillermo Páterson and then transferred to Hospital Pablo Soria's ICU to treat a possible ruptured trachea, where he died days later.
July 2, 2024	David Concha, 9, male	Unknown (4–5)	Tucumán, Concepción — The boy was attacked by dogs while on a field with friends. Four of nine dogs owned by a neighbor were seized by authority. The dog owner was arrested.
April 3, 2024	Hipólito Jesús Duarte, 63 or 64, male	Pit bull (2)	Misiones — Duarte went out for a walk and was attacked by two dogs. The attack caused deep wounds to his face, skull, arms and legs. He was already dead when first responders arrived. The dogs attacked the responders who then shot one dog and followed the other back to its home. The dogs' owner was charged with manslaughter.
March 13, 2024 May 18, 2024 †	Norma Montenegro, 77, female	Pit bull (5)	Florencio Varela, San Francisco — She was working in front of her house when she was suddenly attacked by five dogs. She suffered bites, multiple fractures, including open fractures to her arms, severe head injuries and a dislocated shoulder. She was treated in hospital but died a few weeks later.
March 1, 2024	Santillán, 1, female	Pit bull	Santiago del Estero, Clodomira, Mendilarzu — The family dog attacked the little girl in the early morning hours.
February 25, 2024 February 27, 2024 †	Angélica Teles Triunfo, 45, female	Pit bull (3)	Misiones, Bernardo de Irigoyen— The woman was attacked by two adult dogs and a puppy. The dogs did not stop, despite the intervention by police and the three shots fired into the ground to scare them. The victim's partner suffered serious injuries after being bitten by the dogs while trying to help her.
July 10, 2023	Trinidad, 15, female	Dogo Argentino (2)	Córdoba, Estación Flores — Two dogs escaped and attacked a girl and a man who tried to help. The dogs then went into a house and tried to attack a 7-year-old girl. The family's poodle barked at the intruders and alerted the father. The father stabbed the dogs. The 15-year-old girl died as a result of her serious injuries.
April 2022	Néstor Daniel Morales, 53, male	Unknown (Pack)	Albardón, San Juan Province — A man was attacked by a pack of dogs and died.
November 2, 2021	Florence Elizabeth Ledesma, 23, female	Unknown (7+)	Albardón, San Juan Province, Villa Ampakama, Albardón — Ledesma was attacked by a pack of dogs. She called for help via phone but when help arrived she was already fatally injured. She died on her way to José Giordano hospital in Albardón.
April 2019	6, female	Rottweiler x Dogo*	Buenos Aires, Martínez —The girl was watching TV with the family dog. She was attacked and died on the way to the Central Hospital of San Isidro. *In Argentina "dogo" refers to a dog type and to the breed Dogo Argentino.
May 20, 2014	Santiago Veer, 2, male	Pit bull	Buenos Aires, Alejandro Korn — The owner and breeder of the dog that killed a two-year-old boy was convicted and sentenced to eight years in prison.

=== Brazil ===
See: List of fatal dog attacks in Brazil

=== Colombia ===
Date	Victim	Dog type (Number)	Circumstances
December 15, 2024	Ana Ludivia Bedoya, 80, female	Pit bull	Cauca Department, Puerto Tejada — Bedoya was preparing to feed her dog when she was attacked. Her husband also died when he was informed of her death.
December 2, 2024	Julia Sánchez Ruiz, 106, female	Pit bull	Valle del Cauca Department, El Carmelo, Candelaria — The woman was attacked in her home by her female dog that had just given birth to puppies. She was taken to Joaquín Paz Borrero Hospital in Cali but died.
June 14, 2024	Jesús Hernández Fragoso, 93, male	Pit bull	La Guajira Department, Villanueva — The man was preparing to feed his own dog when it attacked his neck. The dog died from being beaten by neighbors trying to get the dog to release his bite. The man died at the hospital.
October 31, 2023	Karen Granada, 2, female	Pit bull	Caldas Department — The 2-year-old girl was attacked while her caretaker left the room.
May 17, 2023	Johel Sebastián, 4, male	Pit bull (1-4)	Bucaramanga region, Santander — The child went outside to play and was attacked by the dogs. He died at the scene.
April 2023	3, female	Pit bull (2)	Bogotá Capital District, Ciudad Bolívar — The 3-year-old girl was attacked by the family dogs.
February 16, 2017	Rosa Lina López Arango, 89, female	Pit bull	Valle del Cauca Department, Cali, República de Israel — She was attacked by her grandson's dog Rocco while she was sleeping and died of blood loss.

=== Peru ===
Date	Victim	Dog type (Number)	Circumstances
December 8, 2025	<1, female	Pit bull (2)	San Juan de Lurigancho — An 11-month-old baby was sleeping in a crib and was attacked and killed by 2 dogs. The dogs belonged to the grandmother.
January 3, 2025	María Magdalena Benito Osenjo, 72, female	Pit bull	Lima, San Juan de Miraflores — She was attacked by her daughter's dog and died. Her daughter tried to help and was also seriously injured.
September 11, 2024	7, male	Rottweiler (2)	Ucayali, Pucallpa — The 7-year-old boy was attacked by the family's dogs and died at the scene.
August 14, 2024	César Huanca Vallejos, 27, male	Pit bull (2) Rottweiler (2)	Department of Tacna, Tacna — The man was working on a farm when the four dogs, who belonged to his employer, attacked him.
April 15, 2024; August, 2024 †	Roger Ruiz Peña, 44, male	Pit bull (2)	Trujillo, Huanchaco district — He was watering his crops when a neighbor's loose dogs jumped a fence and attacked him. He died after four months in a coma.
March 22, 2024	<1, female	Rottweiler (2)	San Juan de Lurigancho — A 3-month-old girl was attacked by the family's dogs.
July 15, 2023	54, female	Stray dog	Arequipa, Chiguata — The woman was bit by a dog and died of rabies a few months later.
April 1, 2023	Lucy Saldaña Delgado, 62, female	Pit bull	Cajamarca, Bellavista District, San Lorenzo — She was attacked by her dog during the night and found dead the next morning by her employee.
January 22, 2021	6, male	Pit bull (2)	Arequipa, Cerro Colorado — The boy was alone with a male and a female dog (2 and 4 years old) in his yard when the attack happened. The dogs were euthanized.

=== Other South American countries ===
Date	Victim	Dog type (Number)	Circumstances
June 22, 2026	78, female	Pit bull (2)	Bolivia, Cochabamba — She was walking down a street and was attacked by two loose dogs.
May 22, 2025	Celso Celestino Gayoso Román, 56, male	Pit bull (2)	Paraguay, Central Department, Mariano Roque Alonso — The man was attacked in front of the dog owner's property. The dog owner was arrested.
November 23, 2024	84, female	Pit bull	Ecuador, Quito — She was attacked by a 2-year-old dog and died two weeks later on January 7.
December 21, 2024	Paris Antonella, 1, female	Pit bull	Chile, Maule Region, Talca — The toddler was visiting her aunt in Villa Francia. She was playing and wrestling with another toddler when the family dog suddenly attacked. The mother intervened immediately and only one child was injured. She took the girl to the local hospital, but the injuries from multiple bites were not survivable. The victim's grandfather was quoted as saying that he was against this type of dog breed because in his opinion they were too dangerous.
February 17, 2024	24, male	Pit bull	Uruguay, Villa Muñoz — The young man was attacked by his dog. When emergency services arrived, the man was no longer responsive and his dog was still attacking him. Despite attempts to save him, he died at the scene.
January 24, 2024	Wilfredo Leaños, 70, male	Pit bull (2)	Bolivia, Santa Cruz de la Sierra, Tipoy — He was visiting a relative and was attacked and killed by two dogs.
January 16, 2024	Permaul Latchmanen, 64, male	Pit bull (3)	Guyana, Berbice, Corentyne, Topoo Village — Latchmanen was attacked in the early morning hours by three dogs. The dogs' owner was arrested.
October 13, 2023	Daniela Gamboa, 27, female	Stray dog (1+)	Chile, San Pedro de Atacama — She was on the phone with her mother when she was attacked by a pack of dogs. A few days later her body was found by relatives.
July 29, 2023	María Emérita, 78, female	Rottweiler	Venezuela, Barinas, Obispos, Los Guasimitos — She was attacked by her daughter's dog while feeding it.
April 13, 2023	56, male	Pit bull (3)	Chile, Araucanía Region, Renaico — The man was taking out the garbage from his house before leaving for work when he was attacked by his neighbors' dogs from across the street around 4 in the morning. He succumbed to his injuries at the scene of the attack. Subsequently, the owners of the dogs, a mother and her son, were arrested and held responsible for the vicious assault by their three dogs.
July 28, 2022	1, male	Pit bull	Paraguay, La Lomita —The 11-month-old was attacked and killed by the family dog. The dog was 6 years old and lived with the family since it was a puppy.
August 30, 2021	María Elisa Briceño, 73, female	Pit bull (1+)	Venezuela, Margarita, Antolín del Campo, Playa El Agua sector — She was attacked while on her patio and suffered severe injuries to her face and limbs.
April 2021	5, male	Pit bull	Uruguay, Atlántida — The child was playing in the garden and was attacked by a dog.
2018	Yenifer Garcia, 30, female	Pit bull (1), unknown (1)	Uruguay, Casavalle — She was attacked by her two dogs and was found lifeless by alerted police.
March 5, 2016	4, male	Pit bull	Ecuador, Santo Domingo de los Tsáchilas — The 4-year-old was attacked by his grandfather's dog and died at the hospital.
February 11, 2016; February 21 †	Indira Martínez, 57, female	Rottweiler (1), mixed breed (2)	Venezuela, La Guaira, Tanaguarena — She was feeding the dogs when they attacked her. She died after ten days in hospital.

== Europe ==
=== Austria ===
See: List of fatal dog attacks in Austria

=== France ===
See: List of fatal dog attacks in France

=== Germany ===
See: List of fatal dog attacks in Germany

=== Italy ===
See: List of fatal dog attacks in Italy

=== Poland ===
Date	Victim	Dog type (Number)	Circumstances
December 30, 2025; December 31 †	54, male	American Staffordshire Terrier	Krosno Odrzańskie — The dog attacked the man in a home's basement, causing severe head and facial injuries that resulted in the victim's death the following day.
October 15, 2025	Marcin, 46, male	Belgian Shepherd (3)	Zielona Góra — The man was going to collect some mushrooms in a forest when the 3 dogs suddenly attacked and killed him. The man later died at the hospital and Piotr, the 53 year old owner of the dogs was arrested 2 days later.
June 26, 2024	7, female	Great Dane (6)	Barczewo — The six dogs escaped their owners' house and attacked the girl.
January 2, 2024	<1, female	Bull Terrier	Zgorzelec — The seven-week-old baby was attacked by the family pet. She was unconscious and had a damaged skull and broken bones when she arrived at the hospital. She died in the hospital.
November 13, 2023	60, male	American Staffordshire Terrier	Wschowa — A worried wife reported to the police the disappearance of her husband, who went for a walk with his dog and did not return. The man was found dead with numerous bite wounds and missing tissue. The dog was euthanized.
February 23, 2023	8, male	German Shepherd	Komorów - The dog attacked the 8-year-old boy. His grandmother tried to save him, but he did not survive the injuries and was pronounced dead on arrival.
August 23, 2022	47, male	Pit bull	Gdynia — The man was attacked while putting a lead on a friend's dog.
September 2020	Kamil, 12, male	American Pit Bull Terrier (2)	Przemyśl — The boy was killed inside an apartment by two dogs named Joker and Atalaya. The dogs' owner did not possess the mandatory registration permit required for keeping dangerous breeds under Polish law and received a prison sentence for involuntary manslaughter.
September 2019	64, male	German Shepherd (4)	Jelenia Góra — A 64-year-old caretaker was fatally mauled by four German Shepherd-type dogs. The man was found by his wife, who called for help. Firefighters were the first to arrive at the scene.
September 2004	20 days old, male	German Shepherd (3)	Southern Poland — The baby's mother left him sleeping in a stroller. 20 minutes later, the dogs mauled and dragged the newborn on the floor.
November 4, 2002	Emilia, 7, female	Rottweiler (3)	Warsaw — The girl searched for her mother and went into the yard where the dogs attacked her.
September 2004	2 months old, male	Mixed breed	Southern Poland — A 68-day old baby was killed at home by the 4-month-old puppy that belonged to the family.

=== Russia ===
Date	Victim	Dog type (Number)	Circumstances
October 7, 2024 October 9, 2024 †	Viktoria Kashuba, 12, female	Stray dogs (15)	Yakutia, Chulman — She was coming back home from school and speaking to a friend on the phone when the pack of dogs attacked, scalping her. She was taken to a hospital but died two days later.
February 5, 2024	Adult, male	Bull Terrier	Moscow — He was bitten on the neck by his dog. His wife claimed that the dog was trying to save him from a heart attack.
February 20, 2023	Dimu, 9, male	American Pit Bull Terrier	Novgorod, Parfino — The boy was visiting a friend and was attacked by the family's dog.
June 17, 2017	Adult, male	Stray dogs (12)	Sovetsky, Khanty-Mansi Autonomous Okrug — A drunk man, who had been feeding a pack of stray dogs for two years, was attacked and killed by them when he tried to pass the pack without feeding them and fell during the encounter. His remains were found the following morning. The incident was captured on CCTV. He reportedly died just two minutes after the first dog attacked.

=== Spain ===
See: Ataques de perros peligrosos a personas

Date	Victim	Dog type (Number)	Circumstances
February 20, 2025	<1, male	Mastiff	Catalonia, Fonollosa — The child was in the care of his grandparents when he was attacked by the family dog.
October 24, 2023	Josefa Bravo, 96, female	American Bully x American Staffordshire Terrier (2)	Region of Murcia, Alguazas — The two dogs escaped from a neighbors property and attacked the victim. First aid from the paramedics was delayed by the presence of the dogs. The victim was bitten all over her body and died after a week in hospital.
October 23, 2023	27, female	Mastín Leonés (3) Carea Leonés (2)	Castile and León, Zamora — The 5 dogs were chasing the victim according to a phone call she had with her mother during the attack.
February 23, 2023	Anne Shields, 67, female	Pit bull	Valencian Community — The victim found the dog three days before the attack. She tried unsuccessfully to take him to two animal shelters, she told her family. The dog turned against her and destroyed her arms and she lost so much blood that he died the next day. The Guardia Civil had to shoot the dog so that the paramedics could get to the victim.
April 29, 2022	26, male	Pit bull	Valencian Community, Castellon, Nules — The young man was attacked by his dog. The dog was brought to an animal care center located in the town of Vinaròs after the incident.
September 25, 2021	4, male	Belgian Shepherd of the variety Malinois	Andalusia, Córdoba, Lucena — A 4-year-old boy died when he was attacked in his bedroom by one of the dogs that were guarding the house.
January 10, 2021	32, male	American Staffordshire Terrier	Catalonia, Girona — A 32-year-old man died after being attacked by the dog he was walking. The dog belonged to a friend.
October 3, 2018	<1, male	Undisclosed	Tenerife — The family's dog attacked the 20-day-old baby.
April 18, 2017	40, female	Presa Canario	Community of Madrid, El Molar, Madrid — The victim was found dead in her home; she had been attacked by one of her Presa Canarios and died from bites to the neck. The woman lived alone and was a breeder of Pit bulls and Presa Canarios. The dog was seized.
February 18, 2017	Luis Ángel Sala, 76, male	Pit bull mix, Bull Terrier	Valencian Community, Alicante, Beniarbeig — The man was attacked by 5 dogs that belonged to a neighbor. The dog owner was sentenced in 2018 to 26 months in prison for reckless homicide and was ordered to pay €170,000 to the victim's family. The dogs named Blanco, David, Lady Gaga, Hugo and Alba were euthanized. They had a history of aggression and also attacked a shelter member and a person on the streets when they escaped the shelter.
October 26, 2016	74, male	American Staffordshire Terrier, Boxer	Valencian Community, Alicante, Faldar de Pinós — The dogs belonged to a neighbor in the area and escaped due to carelessness. The victim was walking in the area with his wife. The dog's owner and the victim's wife tried to help him. He died at the hospital.
June 21, 2016	José Antonio, 4, male	Guard dog	Andalusia, Jaén — The boy died after he was attacked by a dog.
October 2010	55, female and 60, male	Unknown (20)	Spain, Mataró — Two homeless people were found dead from bite injuries in an encampment. Twenty dogs were found living in unsafe conditions on the property. To retrieve the bodies of the victims, officers shot two of the dogs.
June 9, 2006	Carmen M., 50, female	American Staffordshire Terrier	Canary Islands, Tenerife — She was doing laundry when her son's dog attacked and killed her.
January 29, 1999	Francisco Vega, 4, male	Dogo Argentino	Balearic Islands, Mallorca, Can Picafort — The 2-year-old male dog named Copi escaped the dog owner's son. The son was not allowed to walk the family's two dogs. The loose dog then carried out the fatal attack on the boy.
November 22, 1982	Jean Batten, 73, female	Unknown	Balearic Islands, Mallorca — Batten was bitten by a dog and refused medical treatment. The wound became infected and she developed a pulmonary abscess. She died alone in her hotel room from complications from the dog bite.

=== United Kingdom ===
See: List of fatal dog attacks in the United Kingdom

=== Other European countries ===
Date	Victim	Dog type (Number)	Circumstances
December 6, 2025	Leon Dulia, 2, male	Pit bull	Greece, Zakynthos, Agios Leontas — The parents took the dog in after locals complained it attacked their animals. The boy tried to pet the dog and was killed.
August 30, 2025	66, male	American Bully XL (2)	Netherlands, Rotterdam — The man was killed by his 9-month old dogs in his home.
April 6, 2025	35, male	American Bully XL	Czech Republic, Prachatice — Dog of the breed bully XL in Prachatice torn apart its owner.
January 12, 2025	Aodren, 7, male	Sled dog (5)	Belgium, Quévy — The boy and his mother were feeding the dogs at their breeding facility when 5 dogs attacked and killed him. All 5 Alaskan Malamutes were euthanized.
November 2, 2024	Pedro Madureira Fernández-Escandón, 6, male	Rottweiler	Portugal, Chaves, Faiões — The Spanish boy was spending the weekend with his family at his grandfather's house, when one of his grandfather's dogs attacked him. The boy was taken to a hospital, where he succumbed to his injuries. The dog was seized by the police and taken to a pound.
June 4, 2024	Nicole O’Donnell Morey, 23, female	American Bully XL	Ireland, Co Limerick, Ballyneety — She was attacked by at least one of her four dogs when she entered her home. Gardaí had to shoot one dog that would not let go of her. She died at the scene.
May 29, 2024	38, female	Pit bull	Bulgaria, Varna — The woman was attacked by her dog. He nearly severed her arm. Her partner tried to help her and managed to lock the dog in the bathroom. She was very seriously injured and died at the hospital. The dog had bitten someone before.
April 2024	45, female	American Bully	Sweden, Gothenburg — The dog bit the victim, who was the girlfriend of the owner, in the face. The owner was convicted in the primary instance of "Gross causing of another's death" for failing her responsibility as an owner and for delaying call to aid for the girlfriend for several hours. The owner was sentenced to three years in prison and the dog were euthanized.
December 2023	56, male	Staffordshire Bull Terrier	Belgium, Kortrijk, Emmanuel Viérinwandeling — The man had a seizure and was killed by his dog. The dog showed aggression before during seizures of his owner. The Stafford was euthanized.
December 10, 2023	50, female	Shepherd type (3)	Greece, Neochorouda — The 3 dogs escaped through a hole in a fence and attacked the neighbor. She was bitten more than 50 times. The dogs were confiscated. The owner was arrested and charged with "homicide with possible intent", a felony. A lawyer said he would institute mandatory liability insurance for large dogs, similar to some other countries, which would provide some financial compensation to bite victims.
August 24, 2023	Leon, <1, male	Pit bull (Pit bull x American Staffordshire Terrier cross)	Netherlands, Emmeloord — The 8-week-old boy was attacked by the family dog named Bandi while the mother went into another room to get a bottle of milk. The dog was with the family for 3 years and the mother described him as sweet and caring. Investigation showed that the dog had a history of aggression, leaving the vet and neighbors concerned. Researchers, who observed Bandi after the fatal incident, concluded that the dog was fearless, not people-oriented and not social and that the parents have completely misjudged the risks and signals of their dog.
August 2023	60, male	Rottweiler, Stafford, Shepherd	Netherlands, Terborg — A man was bitten by his dogs and died of blood poisoning. He had several bite wounds and has tried to stitch them up by himself. He was found dead in his chair by police. A Rottweiler, a Stafford and a Shepherd were taken to an animal shelter. The Rottweiler was euthanized after assessing its temperament.
July 23, 2023	73, female	Pit bull	Portugal, Azeitão — She was killed by her grandson's dog.
July 22, 2023	Name undisclosed, 60, female	Pit bull (2)	Greece, Athens — She was found dead in her apartment, having been killed by her sons' 2 pitbulls.
July 16, 2023	Name undisclosed, 47, male	American Staffordshire Terrier	Romania, Galați — The man was killed by his neighbours' dog, which was entrusted to him while they were away after he went to feed it. His 14-year-old niece was also bitten but survived.
April 11, 2023	8, male	Bullmastiff	North Macedonia, Skopje — The boy entered a property and was attacked.
January 4, 2023	Vladan Radosavljević, 63, male	Stafford breed, Pit bull x Stafford cross, unknown breed	Serbia, Belgrade — Three dogs attacked Serbian journalist and co-founder of Serbian media house Mreža Vladan Radosavljević outside his cottage in Kosmaj and his wife Olga, whom he called for help, was also seriously injured in the attack.
2022 – 2013	17 people	Various	Finland — From 2013 to 2022, 17 people died due to a dog attack.
June, 2022	1, male	Rottweiler	Norway, Brumunddal — The grandmother who owned the dog named Nestor knew that the dog had been involved in several attacks on children. Nevertheless, she decided to keep the dog. The doctor who treated one of the children bitten in 2016 told the court she strongly recommended that Nestor be euthanized. A vet explained that the dog was marked with a red warning triangle in his system, which he uses against aggressive animals. The owner was prosecuted for negligently causing the death of a person, she pleaded not guilty and was sentenced to 6-month jail time.
October 23, 2022	60's, female	American Staffordshire Terrier	Sweden, Robertsfors kommun — The dog attacked a man and a woman. The dog first attacked the man indoors, then the woman (owner) brought the dog outside to stop the attack. The dog attacked again, this time towards the woman, which ended with her dying from the attack. The man was taken to the hospital by helicopter to receive care for his injuries, he was moderately injured.
July 12, 2021	Talya, 8, female	American Staffordshire Terrier	Belgium, Strépy-Bracquegnies, La Louvière — The young girl was alone with 3 or 4 dogs when 1 dog attacked her, and she died in hospital.
March 6, 2020	65, male	Stray dog (Pack)	Greece, Pylaia, Thessaloniki — A man was attacked by a pack of dogs while out jogging. The dog pack also attacked an 82-year-old man who sustained minor injuries. Six of the dogs were captured by the city. The 65-year-old was hospitalized for three weeks before dying and his family filed a lawsuit against the city. In 2024 they were awarded €200,000 compensation from the city. The lawyer commented that the decision "opens the way for the claim for compensation from the municipalities, as it delineates the responsibilities of local government for the management of stray dogs."
January 7, 2020	45, female	Belgian Shepherd	Switzerland, Fribourg, Auboranges — A woman was fatally attacked by her dog at a dog training ground. When police arrived to the scene, the dog bit a policewoman's arm and was fatally shot by another officer.
October 22, 2019	Robin, <1, male	German Shepherd	Netherlands, Diemen — The 8-month-old victim got attacked when he was under the supervision of his grandparents. The dog that attacked belonged to the grandparents. The victim was brought to the hospital in a critical condition and died the next day during the night of the 23rd and 24 October. The dog was euthanized on the same day as the attack.
2019	79, female	American Staffordshire Terrier x Rottweiler	Sweden — The victim was out walking her small dog when she was attacked by a loose dog. She tried to defend her dog and herself from the attack, but she fell over and broke her hip. The woman died eleven days after the attack. Examination findings included fresh dog bite marks on the left hand and arm and fresh bruises on the left side of her body.
July 2018	15, male	American Bulldog	Sweden, Bergslagen — A young man was bit severely on the neck by a dog in Ljusnarsberg. Two men were attacked, one was uninjured, but the younger man died from his injuries.
March 15, 2018	Ramóna, 1, female	American Staffordshire Terrier	Hungary, Győr, Nyúl — The family dog attacked the girl while out for a walk with her great-grandfather. The dog named Zeus grabbed the little girl from behind by the head. The great-grandfather was unable to pry open his mouth. Zeus shattered the little girl's skull and bit the man's hand. The paramedics fought for Ramóna's life but she died in hospital. The family had the dog since he was a puppy and he was described as non-aggressive.
January 29, 2018	Toshko, 3, male	Pit bull	Bulgaria, Mokrishte — The boy was bitten all over his body by the family dog named Zeus and died at the scene. An evaluation of the dog showed signs of mistreatment and neglect. The dog was not euthanized and was placed with a foster family with a toddler. They later decided to keep Zeus.
December, 2017	1	Dogo Argentino x American Staffordshire Terrier	Czech Republic, Předmostí — The attack occurred when the owner got up from his chair and left the room. The child pulled the dog by his tail. The dog named "Aron" attacked the boy, biting him repeatedly on the skull and causing a head injury so severe that the child died immediately afterward.
September 21, 2017	Celia Lois Hollingworth, 63 or 64, female	Stray dog (Pack)	Greece — A British woman on holiday in Greece was killed and dismembered by a pack of stray dogs while visiting an archaeological site. She attempted to phone relatives to alert them to the attack. Her body was found the following day, "shredded to pieces, some of it devoured."
June 4, 2017	Teresa McDonagh, 64, female	Presa Canario (3)	Ireland, County Galway — The victim had gone to visit her grandchildren and was found face-down in the lane by her daughter-in-law, the dogs' owner. The dogs had a previous history of aggression including puncturing the postman's tyres. A breeding pair of adult dogs, which weighed 43–46 kilograms (95–101 lb), and one of their puppies were involved. The victim sustained broken bones, and massive injuries, and died of hemorrhagic shock. The inquest jury endorsed recommendations to add the breed to the list of dangerous or restricted dog breeds and mandate muzzling, licensing, and training.
May 1, 2016	5, male	Rottweiler (2)	Greece, Kozani — The 5-year-old child was attacked by a dog in a courtyard of a residential building where he was celebrating Easter with his mother. The little boy was taken to the hospital, where he eventually succumbed to his injuries. The dog owners were sentenced in 2021 to probation and a fine. However, in 2023 an appeals court sentenced the owner (the husband) to 4 years in prison for manslaughter by negligence; his wife was acquitted.
2015	83, female	Fighting dog breed	Hungary, Monaj — The woman was picking potatoes in her garden when she was attacked by her neighbor's dog named Arthur. The dog was up to be euthanized but he was stolen and his whereabouts remain unclear. 3 years after the attack, the dog owner was sentenced to pay compensation.
July 4, 2014 July 5, 2014 †	2, female	Husky	Norway, Sør-Trøndelag, Selbu, Dragsten — The girl went into the family's dog kennel with her sister to get a puppy. There were about 20 dogs in that kennel at the time. She got bitten and died the next day in St. Olav's Hospital.
January 15, 2014	95, female	American Staffordshire Terrier	Slovakia, Rybník — The dog attacked the owner and then also attacked a second woman, who tried to help the victim.
January 6, 2013	Dinis, 1, male	Pit bull	Portugal, Beja — The 18-month-old child was killed by the uncle's dog named Zico. The dog had a history of aggression.
December 14, 2012	1, male	Pit bull	Czech Republic, Prague — The mother left the child alone with the dog. It attacked the young boy.
August, 2012	Lajo, 9, male	Rottweiler (3)	Hungary, Decs-Szőlőhegy — The little boy was attacked in the yard of his house by the three dogs kept there.
December 22, 2009	Vivien, 8, female	Rottweiler (2–3)	Hungary, Poroszló — The girl was alone with the family dogs when they attacked her.
March 2008	10, male	Rottweiler	Finland, Elimäki — The boy was attacked by the male family dog and died at the scene. Two Rottweilers were euthanized after the attack.
August 2, 2007	Dominik Takács, 2, male	Pit bull: American Pit Bull Terrier or American Staffordshire Terrier	Hungary, Monorierdő — His mother claimed he went missing on Margaret Island while she was unconscious. An extensive search was carried out, but the boy was not found. Weeks later, the buried, torn up body was found in the vicinity of the parents' home. It turned out that he had been killed by the family's dogs and his parents hid the body. The police also found a dead dog. His father bred pit bulls and a few dogs have vanished around the time of the disappearance of the child. The parents were sentenced in 2010. Three of their dogs were seized by police, one was euthanized, one given back to the owner and one had died. According to the mother it was likely one of their black dogs with white leg markings.
March 22, 2007	60, female	Rottweiler (4)	Portugal, Sintra, Casal de Granja — She was attacked on her way to work by escaped dogs and died on the way to the hospital.
December 2, 2005	Süleyman Yildirim, 6, male	Pit bull (3)	Switzerland, Zürich, Oberglatt ZH — The boy was attacked and fatally injured by three dogs on his way to kindergarten. He died at the scene. The dog owner was arrested and the involved dogs were euthanized on the same day. The owner hat 3 more Pit Bulls.
January 30, 2002	7, male	Husky (4)	Norway, Oppland, Vest-Torpa, Dokka — The boy was on his way home from school and was attacked by four dogs. The dog belonged to someone who kept 15 to 20 sled dogs.
June 2001	22, female	Bullmastiff	Finland, Tampere, Linnainmaa— The woman was walking her boyfriend's dog and was attacked in the neck region.
June 26, 2000	Volkan Kaya, 6, male	Staffordshire Bull Terrier, Pit bull	Germany, Hamburg — Two dogs jumped into a schoolyard and attacked about 10 children, leaving two injured and one dead. The dogs were shot dead by responding police and two people were arrested. Following this, another fatal dog attack earlier the same year, and a long series of serious injuries caused by fighting dogs, the German government enacted laws banning certain breeds, including penalties of up to 100,000 Deutsche Marks ($48,100 USD).
February 1999	86, female	Unknown	Switzerland, Ticino, Prugiasco — A woman was attacked by a dog while out on a walk and died from her injuries on March 16, 1999. A complaint was filed against the owner of the dog, who had previously attacked multiple people.
December 11, 1994	Tord Tørstad Korban, 6, male	Grønlandshund	Norway — The six-year-old boy was found dead next to the tied-down ten-year-old family dog. The dog was euthanized. The father of the boy had to pay a NOK 10.000 fine.
August 1994	<1	Staffordshire Bull Terrier	Finland, Espoo — The 2-week-old baby was killed by the family dog.
April 27, 1990	Jack Vrielink, 1, male	Pit bull	Netherlands, Amsterdam — The family pet named "Killer" attacked the toddler in front of his family.
November 1971	Frédéric Hinderberger	Unknown	France, Beaumé — A man was bitten several times on the legs as he returned home and died on November 9.

== Africa ==
=== South Africa ===
Date	Victim	Dog type (Number)	Circumstances
January 2, 2026	39, male	Pit bull (2)	North West, Vryburg — The tenant was attacked by 2 dogs. The dogs have previously attacked other tenants. The dogs were euthanized.
November 5, 2024	Simikuso Ntswayibana, 4, male	Undisclosed	Western Cape, Sedgefield — The boy was out playing with other children when a pack of dog started chasing them. One dog attacked Ntswayibana and fatally injured him.
June 17, 2024	28, female	Pit bull (3–4)	Free State, Bloemfontein, Namibia square — The victim was attacked by her boyfriend's dogs and died at the scene. 3 dogs were put down and a female dog and her puppies were taken by SPCA. The dog's owner was arrested.
April 6, 2024	Moeletsi Sedi, 40, male	Pit bull (2)	North West, Rustenburg — The man was attacked at his workplace by the dogs of his employer.
November 22, 2023	Johannes Lewis, 47, male	Pit bull (3)	Western Cape, Lutzville — The dogs also attacked two people earlier that day. They bit the victim in his arms, legs, and neck. He lost a lot of blood and died shortly after the attack.
April 9, 2023	Zibele Liyakhanya Mthi, 5, male	Pit bull (2)	Eastern Cape, Dyamala —The young boy was on his way home when the two dogs attacked him on the street. He died two days later.
March 28, 2023	Olga Grill, 88, female	Pit bull (2)	Western Cape, Bonteheuwel — The woman was at home when the neighbor's dogs jumped her high fence and attacked her.
January 7, 2023	Philemon Mulala, 60, male	Pit bull cross (2), Unknown breed (1)	North West, Lichtenburg — His three dogs attacked him in his house to death.
December 23, 2022 December 28, 2022 †	Melitta Sekole, 43, female	Dogs (2 or 3) Pit bull or Rottweiler	Limpopo, Blouberg, Vivo — The victim was attacked by 2 or 3 dogs on December 23 while walking to work. She died 5 days later in hospital. The 62-year-old owner of the dogs was arrested and charged with culpable homicide. The dogs were surrendered to be euthanized.
December 3, 2022	Floyd Metsileng, 39, male	Pit bull (2)	North West — The victim was killed by 2 dogs guarding a tavern.
November 27, 2022	Zimkhitha Brenda Gaga, 37, female	Pit bull (3)	Eastern Cape, Port Alfred — She was on her way to work when the three dogs attacked her. The dogs escaped through a fence they damaged.
November 23, 2022	Reuben le Roux, 1, male	Pit bull	Eastern Cape, East London, Gonuvie Farm — The 15-month-old boy played with the neighbour's dog. When a dog walker passed the property the dog tried to get to the dog but failed to get out. After that he attacked the child. The 6-year-old dog named Whisky had already killed two other dogs.
November 12, 2022	Olebogeng Mosime, 8, male	Pit bull	Free State, Bloemfontein — The dog escaped, jumped a fence, and attacked the young boy who was playing at his home. The victim died at the scene. The family of the victim sued the dog owner.
November 20, 2022	Keketso Innocent Saule, 3, male	Pit bull (2)	Free State, Hennenman — Two pit bulls killed a three-year-old boy in Hennenman.
September 26, 2022	Storm Nuku, 10, male	Pit bull (2)	Port Elizabeth, Gqeberha — The young victim was attacked by the two family dogs.
May 16, 2022	Charmaine Munepya, 6, female	Pit bull	Gauteng, Atteridgeville — The young girl was killed by a dog that came into the yard and attacked the playing children.
December, 2021	Simamkele Kovu, 3, female	Pit bull	Port Elizabeth, Gqeberha, Zwide — The dog escaped and attacked the girl playing in the street.
January 4, 2021	Milani Keke, 4, male	Pit bull (2)	Western Cape, Gugulethu — The boy was playing rugby when he was attacked by the two dogs.
October 27, 2020	Luqmaan Jardien, 3, male	Pit bull	The young victim was at his home when he was attacked by the dog which jumped into the home through a window.
October 19, 2020	Belinda Jonker, 64, female	Pit bull	Port Elizabeth — The family dog attacked while the victim and her husband got into their car. She died at the scene.
September, 2020	3, male	Pit bull (maybe 3)	KwaZulu-Natal, Pietermaritzburg, Glenwood — The boy was visiting a friends house. When he went outside he was attacked by at least 1 of the 3 dogs.
January 23, 2020	Jan van Aswegen, 64, male	Pit bull (4)	Gauteng, Alberton, Mayfield Park — A 74-year-old dog owner was attacked by her for dogs. He tried to help her and her dogs turned on him. He died due to blood loss.
September 27, 2019	Melvin Stuurman, 48, male	Pit bull (3)	Port Elizabeth — Victim found dead with bite wounds to his face. Investigating authorities seized three dogs that were being washed nearby.
June 7, 2019	Gontse Ramarimela, 9, female	Pit bull	Gauteng, Mabopane — Victim killed by neighbor's dog that kept jumping over the fence.
May 18, 2019	3, female	Dogs (2 or more)	Limpopo — The Victim had wandered into the backyard of a tavern where she was attacked by dogs. Her mother was inside the tavern.
January 10, 2019	Dharmaseelan Aubrey Moodley, 49, male	Boerboel, Pit bull cross	KwaZulu-Natal, Phoenix, Northcroft — The two dogs attacked him when he was walking by.
December 6, 2018	6	Rottweiler (2)	Western Cape, Cape Town — Victim was attacked by two dogs.
November 7, 2017	Lisa, 1, female	Rottweiler (2)	Western Cape, Cape Town, Malmesbury —The 14-month-old child was killed by the family's dogs.
November 1, 2017	Callum Kruger, <1, male	Pit bull	Gauteng, Primrose — The 6-month-old baby was attacked at his grandmother's house.
July 31, 2017	Gemma Madden, 9, female	Pit bull	KwaZulu-Natal, Durban —The victim was attacked by the family dog.
January 15, 2017	Eslene Naidoo, 3	Pit bull	KwaZulu-Natal, Durban, Mayville —The children were playing outside their grandmother's house when one of the pet dogs killed the child and critically injured the sister.
April 4, 2017	11, female	Pit bull	Western Cape, Calitzdorp — A dog broke free of its chain and inflicted severe head injuries on a girl when she arrived at a neighbor's for an errand.
August 26, 2016	Faith Hendricks, 1, female	Pit bull	Western Cape, Cape Town — The Victim was grabbed by the neck and shaken violently by the family dog which broke free of its chain. The dog was euthanized as it sustained blunt force trauma, broken bones, and stab wounds while trying to stop the attack. The owner was also bitten.
August 26, 2016	6, male	Dogs (2)	Western Cape, Stellenbosch — The victim and his cousin were swimming in a pond when the dogs jumped over a fence.
August 14, 2016	Peter Frans, 4, male	Dog	Western Cape, Oudtshoorn — Victim was attacked by the family dog. The dog was euthanized.
April, 2016	Mpho Mokoena, 32, female	Boerboel, Rottweiler (2)	KwaZulu-Natal, Pietermaritzburg —The three family dogs attacked her while she was in the backyard. She died at the scene.
November 20, 2010	5, male	Rottweiler	Western Cape, Cape Town, Durbanville — The child was killed by a dog guarding a yard.
May 29, 2005	Rita Boschoff, female	Boerboel	KwaZulu-Natal, Estcourt — The family pet named "Butch" attacked the wife and killed her at the scene, the husband tried to help her and was injured.

=== Other African countries ===
Date	Victim	Dog type (Number)	Circumstances
November 5, 2024	Adult, male	Boerboel (2), Cane Corso	Nigeria, Lagos, Ilasan, Lekki — A security guard was killed by 3 escaped dogs.
March 18, 2024	Raphael Obuku, <1, male	Rottweiler	Uganda, Katabi Town — The family's guard dog broke out of his kennel and attacked the child.
March 18, 2024	Eugénia Massantigo, 38, female	Pit bull (3)	Mozambique, Maputo Province, Boane — She was attacked by the dogs in the farm where she worked. The dogs belonged to the farm owner.
February 24, 2024	38, female	Pit bull	Angola, Luanda — She was attacked by her husband's dog inside her house. The dog had a history of aggression and previous attacks.
February, 2024	1, female	Pit bull (3)	Angola, Luanda — The child was attacked by the dogs in her backyard. She died at the scene.
November 21, 2023	Abias Félix Chissengue Costa, 7, male	Pit bull	Angola, Belas — The boy entered his house's backyard and was attacked by his father's dog. He died at the scene.
September 24, 2023	Ruben Abraham, 44, male	Rottweiler x German Shepherd (5)	Namibia, Oshakati — The dogs escaped through a fence and attacked the man who was coming home from work.
August 26, 2023	Beatriz Domingas da Costa, 10, female	Pit bull (2)	Angola, Talatona — The girl was playing on the street when the dog's owner let the dogs loose, who then attacked her. One of the dogs bit her on the neck, fatally injuring her.
April 9, 2023	Mohamed Moheb al-Mawy, 42, male	Pit bull	Egypt, Sheikh Zayed City — The man was attacked by his neighbor's dog and died after a month in coma.
March 25, 2023	9, female	Pit bull	Zimbabwe, Harare — The young girl was attacked by a dog and died at Parirenyatwa Hospital.
October 5, 2022	7, male	Boerboel	Zimbabwe, Norton — The boy left his home to fetch water and was later found dead on the neighbor's property.
August 24, 2022	Moleen Ndlovu, 6, female	Boerboel (2)	Zimbabwe, Bulawayo, Matsheumhlophe — The dogs belonged to the landlord of the family. The landlord heard the screams and tried to intervene together with another woman. One dog released the girl but the other dog continued to attack and dragged her further away. The girl and the dogs knew each other, she used to play with the dogs. It is unclear why they attacked her.
May 14, 2022	John Gavhera, 61, male	Boerboel cross (3)	Zimbabwe, Bulawayo, Selbourne Park — The victim jumped over his fence and was attacked by his dogs.
May 2, 2022	Caren Akinyi Aluoch, 28, female, and her son, 1	Rottweiler (2)	Kenya, Siaya, Ugenya, Siranga Village — The mother and her child were attacked by escaped dogs and died at the scene.
January 23, 2022	25, male	Pit bull	Botswana, Mogoditshane, Gaborone — The victim came with a friend to repair the dog owner's car. The dog attacked while the owner went out to buy things needed for the repair.
January 24, 2022	Roselyn Nafuna, 39, female	Boerboel	Kenya, Malindi, Moriema — The victim was attacked by her employer's dog.
October 30, 2018	Thomas Mwandjendavi, 45, male	Pit bull	Namibia, Windhoek, Otjomuise — The dog broke free and injured five people. The security guard died, and the dog continued to attack other people.
August 18, 2015	Elizabeth Claire Wright, 55, female	Rottweiler (3)	Kenya, Watamu — The Kenyan husband of the English victim came home to find his wife dead and the three dogs feeding on her body. The husband said he'd warned her to stay away from the dogs, and it was presumed she had opened their cage to feed them. The victim had been visiting her husband at his Kenya beachside home from her home in England where she worked at a school.
June 27, 2015	Fred Savage, 13, male	Pit bull (2)	Namibia, Windhoek, Otjomuise — The boy was riding his bike with friends when he was attacked by two dogs, which escaped their owner's yard. The dogs have bitten someone before.
November 20, 2006	male (2)	American Pit Bull Terrier (3)	Botswana, Mmamashia — A man was working on a farm near Mochudi and was killed by three dogs. The dogs already killed a Zimbabwean man a few months earlier.
June 1, 2025	Samuel Machara, 39, male	Pit Bull	Zimbabwe, Harare, Bluff Hill, Ward 41 — The dogs would have apparently been left unmuzzled and roaming in the yard while his owner slept. They scaled over the short perimeter wall of the property and then charged Machara, whose body had deep wounds on the neck and laceration wounds on the hands, legs and stomach. The body was found near the dog owner's residence. The dog's owner, Mike Mapinga, was arrested and faces charges of culpable homicide.

== Asia ==
=== India ===
Date	Victim	Dog type (Number)	Circumstances
August 19, 2025	Karunakaran, 48 or 55, male	Pit bull	Tamil Nadu, Chennai, Jafferkhanpet — The man walked past his neighbor's property and was attacked.
August 29, 2024	Prabhas Kalangutkar, 7, male	Pit bull	Goa, Anjuna — The 7-year-old boy was attacked by his mother's employer's dog.
May 14, 2024	<1	Stray dog	Telangana, Vikarabad — A dog entered a home and attacked and killed a 5-month-old sleeping child.
February 24, 2024	Divyanshi, 1, female	Stray dog (1+)	Delhi — The young girl was attacked by several stray dogs and declared dead upon arrival at the hospital.
December 31, 2023 January 1, 2024 †	Geeta Devi, 60, female	Stray dog (8–10)	Bihar, Begusarai, Arva panchayat — She was attacked by 8 to 10 dogs while she was caring for cattle. She was rescued but died the next day in hospital.
December 2023	Manju Devi, 52, female	Stray dog (1+)	Bihar, Begusarai, Rani panchayat — She was working on a farm and was attacked by a pack of dogs. She died at the hospital.
April 16, 2023	Safdar Ali, 70, male	Stray dog (1+)	Uttar Pradesh, Aligarh — A 70-year-old retired UNICEF doctor was killed on AMU campus by stray dogs. His death was caught on CCTV.
February 19, 2023	Pradeep, 4, male	Stray dog (3)	Telangana, Hyderabad — A 4-year-old boy was fatally attacked by three stray dogs on a deserted street, with graphic footage circulating on social media.
2023	Nine women	Stray dog	Bihar, Begusarai — A total of nine women were killed by so-called man-eater dogs.
2022–2023	10 people	Stray dog	Uttar Pradesh, Bijnor — 10 people, including six children were killed by stray dogs from 2022 to 2023.
October 2022	<1	Stray dog	Uttar Pradesh, Noida — The death of a seven-month-old baby in October 2022 increased debates about dog rights. People made candlelit protests about the death of the child by stray dog attacks.
July 13, 2022	82, female	Pit bull	Uttar Pradesh, Lucknow, Kaiserbagh — The pet attacked its owner in her house. She was taken to hospital by her son but died due to blood loss. She suffered several deep wounds from her neck to her abdomen as well as on her legs.
2022		Stray dog (1+)	Punjab — In April 2022, stray dogs mauled children to death.
2022	Nathia, 30, female	Stray dog (1+)	Uttar Pradesh, Bijnor — In January 2022, in Bijnor, a 30-year-old woman was mauled to death by a pack of stray dogs. This was a somewhat rare case of stray dogs killing an adult woman, as they usually attack children.
December 2021	15, female	Stray dog (1+)	Uttar Pradesh, Amroha, Husainpur village — A pack of stray dogs attacked and killed a teenager near her home.
2020	<1, male	Stray dog (1+)	Uttar Pradesh, Farukhabad — In 2020, a three-hour-old newborn baby was mauled to death by stray dogs in Farukhabad, Uttar Pradesh, as hospital staff left a window open in an operating theatre. Police filed a case against the hospital staff.
2019	male	Stray dog (1+)	Punjap, Amritsar — In 2019, a boy was attacked, killed and eaten by stray dogs. The dogs were called man-eater dogs. In 2019, Chandigarh saw an increase in stray dog bites and a child was mauled to death by stray dogs.
2018		Stray dog	Uttar Pradesh, Khairabad, Sitapur — In 2018, stray dogs killed 14 children. The dogs were called man-eaters as some of the children's body parts were chewed off. Scientists investigated why the dogs were killing children.
April 17, 2017	Kunhikrishnan, 85, male	Stray dog (1+)	Kerala, Thiruvananthapuram, Thiruvilam — The man was on his way to get a haircut when he was attacked by stray dogs. He was later found dead with severe injuries.
August 19, 2016	Sheeluamma or Siluvamma, 65, female	Stray dog (1+)	Kerala, Thiruvananthapuram, Kannramkulam — A 65-year-old woman was mauled to death by a large pack of stray dogs. The woman was partially eaten by the dogs. After this, angry locals killed 100 stray dogs. Some people even offered bounties for killing stray dogs.
October 26, 2016	Charuvila Veetil Raghavan, 90, male	Stray dog (1+)	Kerala, Thiruvananthapuram, Varkala — A 90-year-old man was attacked by stray dogs outside of his house. He died at the hospital.
2015	7, male	Stray dog (1+)	Delhi — A seven-year-old boy was mauled to death by stray dogs. the National Human Rights Commission spoke about the death, and the need for a debate about human rights along with animal rights. Delhi High Court asked SDMC about street safety due to the death of the boy.
2014	Sagun, <1, female	Stray dog	Dehli — In 2014, a two-month-old baby girl was mauled to death by a stray dog. After that, residents attacked and killed the dog. The incident caused anger amongst the public who complained about civic bodies not controlling the growing stray dog population.
2009	20, male	Stray dog	Uttar Pradesh, Meerut — In 2009, Meerut had several attacks by dogs that killed two children and a 20-year-old man.
March 2007	4, male	Stray dog (1+)	Karnataka, Bangalore — A pack of stray dogs attacked the boy. Animal rights activists later protested against the Bruhat Bengaluru Mahanagara Palike for the action they took against stray dogs, which they considered to be cruel and improper.
January 2007	8, female	Stray dog (1+)	Karnataka, Bangalore — A girl was attacked by a pack of dogs in January 2007 at a garbage-strewn area.

=== Thailand ===
Date	Victim	Dog type (Number)	Circumstances
September 24, 2024	Daeng Thammatanta, 67, female	Pit bull	Pathum Thani, Sam Khok district, Chiang Rak Noi — Thammatanta was on her bicycle when she was attacked by a 2-year-old male dog named Poi Kai. The owner had the dog since he was a puppy. The dog already attacked others before the fatal attack.
August 30, 2024	Adisak Chansakunnee, 18, male	American Bully (2)	Phang Nga province, Muang district — The teenager was killed by 2 dogs named Tesla and Fino owned by his brother. The dogs involved and their 4-year-old mother named Tank Gas were put up for adoption.
July 24, 2024	Lek Seepak, 70, male	American Bully (3)	Khon Kaen province, Phu Wiang district — The man was attacked by 3 escaped dogs. The dogs belonged to a neighbor who raised them.
April 2, 2024	Prapaipit, 74, female	Thai Ridgeback	Bangkok, Thawi Watthana district — The woman with Alzheimer's disease entered the wrong property and was attacked by the dog named Perm.
December 20, 2023	Thong Mai Sung, 64, male	Pit bull (2)	Mae Sai District, Chiang Rai — Two loose dogs attacked the man and fatally wounded him. The dogs had a history of attacking and killing animals in the area.
July 2, 2023	Pratheep, 78, male	Pit bull (2)	Lampang — Two Pit Bulls, named Big and Black, killed their 78-year-old owner while he slept.
February 9, 2023	Thedpong, 47, male	Pit bull	Nakhon Ratchasima — His mother was attacked and severely injured by his dog named Bobby. He helped his mother fight off the dog and put him into his kennel, but was also attacked. Family members got him out of the kennel, but he did not survive his extreme injuries. A Thai animal protection organization, has offered assistance in rehabilitating Bobby.
December 15, 2022	Pornchai, 47, male	Pit bull (3)	Udon Thani — The dogs escaped their property and attacked the man at the entrance of his home.
March 20, 2019	Iat, 75, female	Pit bull (6)	Bangkok — The victim's family returned home to find the 75-year-old grandmother had been attacked and mauled by the family's six pit bull terriers. The woman was found dead, lying in a pool of blood outside the house, having been bitten all over. The dogs were put back in their cage.
June 11, 2011	Mana Tesrit, 51, male	Golden Retriever	Chonburi province, Sattahip district — A 51-year-old man was kicking his dog, as he often did, and in the course of this was attacked by the 3-year-old dog named Peter. Neighbors rushed to his aid and restrained the dog. He was immediately taken to a medical facility. In total, he has visited 3 different medical facilities. His family accused the facilities of not taking his condition serious enough. He died due to blood loss complications.

=== Other Asian countries ===
Date	Victim	Dog type (Number)	Circumstances
August 20, 2026	Jojo, 33, female, kennel operator	American Bully Mix	Hong Kong, Ta Kwu Ling — The kennel operator was fatally attacked by a 30kg one-year-old dog staying at the dog hotel after she fed the dog and tried to lead the dog back into the cage.
May 18, 2023	female	Pit bull	Vietnam, Binh Duong Province, Di An City — The dog fatally attacked the mother of the owner of the dog.
September 2019	Birgitte Kallestad, 24, female	Unknown	Philippines — The woman was on holiday and took care of a puppy. The puppy bit her playfully and infected her with rabies. She died later at home in Norway. This imported rabies case was the first case of rabies in 200 years in Norway.
May 2019	Tsutomu Fukumoto, 82, male	Tosa Inu	Japan, Hyogo Prefecture, Minamiawaji — He was attacked and killed while taking care of the dog.
April 2019	62, female	Tosa Inu	Japan, Anseong — She was attacked by the 3-year-old dog of the head of her nursing home. The owner was also bitten.
February 25, 2014	Tomiko Hashiba, 59, female	Tosa Inu	Japan, Hokkaido, Takeura — The woman was attacked and lost consciousness and drowned in a river.

== Oceania ==
=== Australia ===
Date	Victim	Dog type (Number)	Circumstances
August 6, 2026	23, male	Guard dogs: Belgian Shepherd or German Shepherd (8)	New South Wales, Sydney, Eschol Park — The property owner discovered the body of the young man. 8 guard dogs were seized from the property.
September 4, 2025; September 8, 2025†	Annalyse Blyton, 17, female	Boxer x Bull Arab x Irish Wolfhound	New South Wales, Singleton — The girl was visiting her friend and was attacked by a 10-year-old dog. She died 4 days later.
October 15, 2023	66, male	Rottweiler	Tasmania, Allens Rivulet — The family dog named Ruben bit his owner and caused serious injuries to his lower legs. He died at the scene. The wife also sustained serious injuries and was brought to the hospital. The dog was euthanized.
August 2023	Tracy Ridout, 53, female	German Shepherd	Perth, Baldivis — The woman contracted Capnocytophaga canimorsus through a minor injury. The dog accidentally bit her finger instead of a toy.
February 18, 2023	Mia Riley, 5 weeks, female	Rottweiler (2)	New South Wales, Moruya — The victim was sleeping in her cradle outside her grandfather's home when the two dogs attacked her out of nowhere. Neighbours claimed that they were worried about the dogs and that they had complained to the council. Both dogs have been euthanized.
December 3, 2022	Kane Minion, 42, male	Bandog Bullmastiff cross, Rhodesian Ridgeback cross	Queensland, Logan — Minion, 42, was working and trying to read a meter when he was set upon by the dogs in the front yard of a fenced property on Ison Road in the Logan suburb of Greenbank on the morning of December 3. He died at the scene. The two dogs were euthanized.
November 8, 2022	Jyedon Pollard, 2, male	Cattle dog, Rottweiler	New South Wales, Central West — The boy got into the area where the dogs were kept and was attacked.
January 29, 2022	Talan Peters, 2, male	Bull Arab	Queensland, Mena Creek — Two-year-old boy was mauled to death by the family's pig hunting dog, sustaining major skull trauma. After being transported to Innisfail Hospital and then again to Townsville Base Hospital, the toddler died from internal bleeding while in an induced coma after going through emergency brain surgery.
December 24, 2021	Manny Eveleigh, 5, male	Bull Terrier cross or English Bull Terrier x American Bulldog	Queensland, Varsity Lakes — A five-year-old boy was mauled to death by a family friend's dog. His grandmother was also injured.
July 11, 2021	Undisclosed, 5 weeks old, male	American Staffordshire Terrier	New South Wales, Kariong — Five-week-old baby boy was mauled to death by the family dog in the early hours of the morning.
June 8, 2021	Amanda Carmichael, 41, female	Pit bull cross (3)	Maryborough, Queensland — The woman visited a property where she was minding the dogs while their owner was away, they mauled her to death in the backyard. Neighbours raised the alarm.
March 29, 2020	Ada "Sally" Holland, 91, female	Bullmastiff x Pit bull (3)	New South Wales, Vincentia — Three dogs escaped their yard in the early morning and headed to Collingwood Beach where they attacked a total of 5 people, killing a 91-year-old woman while she was on her morning walk. The four other people were taken to hospital with bites and lacerations. The dogs were all unregistered. A week before the fatal attack the dogs escaped their yard and one dog bit someone. In May 2022 the dog owners were fined $5,000 and banned from owning a dog for 5 years.
July 10, 2019	Leo Biancofiore, 61, male	American Staffordshire Terrier	Victoria, Mill Park — The victim, a wheelchair user, was attacked and killed by his son's dog. The victim's 58-year-old wife was hospitalized with serious injuries. Police officers jumped a fence and fired shots to stop the attack. The dog, which was not registered locally, was captured and euthanized.
June 10, 2019	Graham Smith, 51, male	Staffordshire Bull Terrier	New South Wales, Nowra — Victim was found dead in his unit. After investigating the death, investigators came to the conclusion he was attacked by his dog after having an epileptic seizure. There were extensive injuries to the body. The dog was euthanized.
May 16, 2019	Rosemary O'Reilly, 72, female	Staffordshire Bull Terrier x Rhodesian Ridgeback	New South Wales, Wilton — The couple's pet dog attacked either the wife or husband (reports vary) and the other stepped in to help. Both suffered severe bite wounds. The woman died in hospital. The dog was seized, had been owned by the couple for about 3 years, was registered, and had not been reported to the council previously. There were several dogs at the home.
January 24, 2019	Colin Amatto, 40, male	American Staffordshire Terrier (2)	New South Wales, Tregear — The victim was attacked on January 24 and sustained a significant number of injuries to his face, abdomen, and chest, and went into cardiac arrest. He was placed in an induced coma and died five weeks later on March 1, 2019. A 30-year-old woman and her 10-year-old daughter were also injured in the attack and taken to hospital with minor injuries. The family dogs Boof and Hope were euthanized. The family called for the creation of Colin's Law, which would allow for the seizure and euthanasia of dogs that had been involved in attacks and had caused significant harm. One of the dogs that attacked Colin had attacked a man before but was returned to its owner.
August 2, 2018	1, female	German Wirehaired Pointer	Victoria, Gippsland — The 14-month-old toddler was in the kitchen with her mother when the 8-year-old dog attacked her. The mother was also injured.
March 3, 2018	Kamillah Jones, 1, female	Rottweiler	New South Wales, Inverell — The dog grabbed the baby girl out of her pram while the mother was walking with her daughter down the street. The child suffered critical injuries and died on the way to hospital. The dog, owned by a family member, had cleared a fence. The dog was seized.
October 25, 2017	Tania Klemke, 46, female	Pit bull	Australian Capital Territory, Canberra — The family dog named Simba attacked a friend of the victim. The victim helped her friend and was attacked herself.
August 2017	Sue Lopicich, 58, female	Bullmastiff cross	Perth, Southern River — The victim was found in her yard by her daughter. The dog was very aggressive and guarded her body. First responders received counselling afterwards, given the horrific scene. The dog named Stirling was euthanized.
August 4, 2013	Deeon Higgins, 2, male	Mastiff cross	New South Wales, Deniliquin — The boy was attacked in his grandmother's yard by the dog named Kingston. The 70-year-old grandmother was also injured.
August 18, 2011	Ayen Chol, 4, female	Pit bull	Victoria, Melbourne — The dog escaped from his yard and entered the neighbour's home. He attacked three people, the four-year-old died at the scene. The dog was not registered. The dog owner was fined $4,000 for the death of Ayen (owning a dog that attacked and killed a person), $6,000 for two counts of owning a dog that caused serious injury and $1,000 for having an unregistered dog. He could only be fined. In the wake of the child's death the law was changed.
January 7, 2009	Ruby Lea Burke, 3, female	Bullmastiff cross (2), Large crossbreed (2)	New South Wales, Whitton — The dog owner was babysitting two girls. One girl died at the scene and one was severely injured by four of her five large dogs.
December 28, 2007	<1, female	Rottweiler	Victoria, Pakenham — The baby was in her cot when the family dog attacked her. She died before she could be airlifted to the Royal Children's Hospital.
July 2006	Tyra Kuehne, 4, female	Pig hunting dog (1+)	New South Wales, Warren — She was killed by her neighbor's pig hunting dogs.
October 31, 2002	Rita Thompson, 75, female	Bullmastiff cross, Great Dane x Bullmastiff	New South Wales, Bathurst — Thompson was dragged out of bed and attacked by two of the family's dogs named Red and Gemma (trained pig hunting dog). She was found in front of the house with all of her clothes removed and her limbs ripped open, exposing bone, including her entire skull. The family had 10 adult dogs and 5 puppies.

=== New Zealand ===
See also: George (dog)

Date	Victim	Dog type (Number)	Circumstances
August 14, 2026	Sonny-Charles Watson, 1, male	Undisclosed*	Canterbury, Christchurch, Aranui — The one-year-old was attacked and killed by one of the family's dogs at home. *The parents owned an American Bully XL and other pit bull type dogs.
February 17, 2026	Mihiata Te Rore, 62, female	Undisclosed (3)	Northland, Kaipara, Kaihu area — Te Rore visited a property where she was attacked and killed by 3 dogs. Prior to the fatal incident, there had been several complaints about the dogs.
March 28, 2025	Timothy Tu'uaki Rolleston-Bryan, 4 male	Undisclosed (3)	Bay of Plenty, Katikati – The boy was attacked while visiting a property. He died at the Katikati Medical Centre. Three dogs were euthanized.
October 12, 2023	Elizabeth "Effie" Whittaker, 78, female	Undisclosed	Northland, Moerewa — The victim had been hanging out the washing when she had to intervene in a dog fight and one of the dogs turned on her. It was not a roaming dog as first reported. Two more people got attacked and suffered moderate injuries. The dog was shot by a neighbor.
August 4, 2022	Neville Thomson, 69, male	Large dogs (6), including Mastiff and Bulldog cross	Northland, Panguru — Thomson let a friend and his 20 dogs temporarily stay with him. He was attacked by those dogs and died at the scene. The victim's own 2 dogs were kept separate and were not involved in the attack. The owner of the 6 unregistered adult dogs (Lovely, Son, Man, Darling, Bubba and Pipi) and 17 puppies was charged with "owning a dangerous dog causing injury or death" which was later upgraded to manslaughter.
October 25, 2020	Jaxon Johnson, <1, male	Rottweiler	Waikato, Hamilton — A 3-day-old boy was attacked while the mother went to the bathroom. The dog was left in her care by a friend.
March 29, 2013	Chloe Jane Mathewson, 31, female	Rottweiler (2)	Auckland Region, Redvale — She went outside a house and was attacked by 2 of 3 large dogs belonging to the property owner.
April 21, 2007	Virginia Ohlson, 56, female	Pit bull (2)	Bay of Plenty Region, Murupara — Ohlson was attacked near her house by two escaped dogs.
August 18, 2004	Carol Leeanne Taylor, 39, female	Bullmastiff	Otago, Caversham, Dunedin — She was attacked by her male dog named Sytan in her home and yard. Her neighbors were unable to help her, out of fear of the dog. She died at the scene, shortly after the police arrived.
February 2003	Yvonne Harris, 73, female	Alaskan Malamute	Northland Region, Ruakākā — The dog breeder was found dead in her chair by a neighbor. She had injuries to her leg and had died from blood loss.
April 6, 1997	Koro Dinsdale, 59, male	Bull terrier cross (1–2)	Bay of Plenty Region, Te Puke — Dinsdale tried to stop 2 pig hunting dogs from fighting and was killed. He owned one dog and took care of the other dog for a friend.

== See also ==
Lists of animal attacks

- List of fatal alligator attacks in the United States
- List of fatal bear attacks in North America
- List of fatal cougar attacks in North America
- Lists of fatal shark attacks
- List of fatal snake bites in the United States
- List of fatal snake bites in Australia
- List of wolf attacks

Animal attacks per region

- Animal attacks in Australia
- Animal attacks in Latin America
- Snakebite in Latin America
