= Kibler Park =

- Location within Gauteng Location within South Africa
- Coordinates: 26.304°S 28.006°E
- Country: South Africa
- Province: Gauteng
- Municipality: City of Johannesburg
- Main Place: Johannesburg

Government
  - Councillor: Matsobane Sekhu (Democratic Alliance)

Area
  - Total: 2.40 km^{2} (0.93 sq mi)

Population (2011)
  - Total: 5,618
  - Density: 2,340/km^{2} (6,060/sq mi)

Racial makeup (2011)
  - Black African: 44.0%
  - Coloured: 14.0%
  - Indian/Asian: 6.8%
  - White: 34.8%
  - Other: 0.4%

First languages (2011)
  - English: 41.6%
  - Afrikaans: 19.2%
  - Zulu: 12.8%
  - Sotho: 7.1%
  - Other: 19.4%
- Time zone: UTC+2 (SAST)
- Postal code (street): 2091
- PO box: 2053

Kibler Park is a suburb of Johannesburg, South Africa. It is located in Region F. Kibler Park has a nature reserve, an 18-hole golf course, top class recreation centre, high profile conference centre and hotel, shopping centres, two filling stations, two private schools, a public primary school, a public high school, pubs, churches, and a fully operational fire station. It is a quiet, farm-type suburb at southern edge of Johannesburg. It is 17 km (15 minutes) south of the Johannesburg CBD.

Neighboring suburbs in the immediate vicinity are Risi Park, Patlynn, Mayfield Park, and Alveda Park.
