= List of fatal dog attacks in Austria =

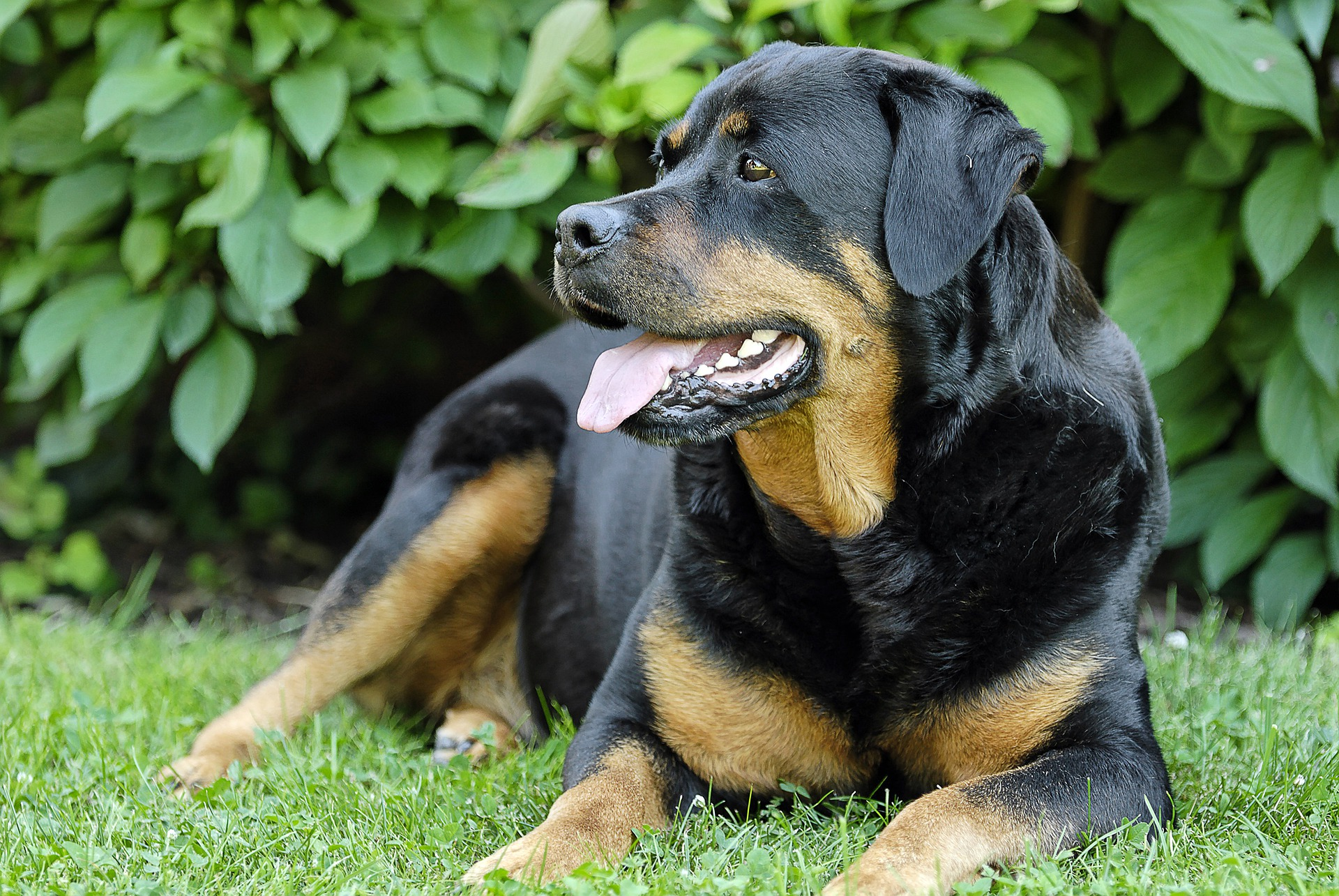
An example of a Rottweiler breed dog.

Fatal or nearly fatal dog attacks in Austria have led to tightening of existing laws on keeping dogs in some of the nine provinces. The keeping of dogs in general, certain dog types or breeds, and "dogs with increased risk potential" is regulated differently from province to province. For example, Vienna prohibits protection dog training and other comparable training that involves attack behavior directed against humans. The provinces Vienna, Lower Austria, Upper Austria and Vorarlberg have breed-specific legislation, as of 2024.

This is a list of human deaths caused by dogs reported by the news media, published in scholarly papers, or mentioned through other sources. In the lists below, the dog type or breed is assigned by the sources. For more information on causes of death and studies related to dog bite-related fatalities, see Fatal dog attacks.

== Fatalities from 1987 to current ==
Date	Victim	Dog type (Number)	Location — Circumstances
October 6, 2023	52, F	Rottweiler (1)	Lower Austria, Wilfleinsdorf — A woman was walking along a road with her two grandchildren on July 26 when the female dog named Kim escaped from a garden, ran into the road, and bit several times. The entire family had to be treated in the hospital, the children suffered minor injuries. The woman received intensive medical care for 2.5 months and died as a result of her injuries. The dog originally came from a breed of the Austrian Armed Forces. She was taken to the Military Dog Center Kaisersteinbruch in Burgenland after the incident and later handed over to an animal shelter-like facility. The dog was rehomed after 6 months. The dog owner's daughter was charged and found not guilty in October 2024.
October 2, 2023	60, F	American Staffordshire Terrier (3)	Upper Austria, Naarn — The woman was jogging near her house when she came across her neighbor and dog owner. According to initial reports, it was the male dog "Elmo" that killed the woman. She suffered very serious injuries and died before help arrived. The male dog was euthanized the same day of the incident. It later became known that the dog owner was out with three dogs, she said she fell and when she looked up, all three dogs were with the victim. In January 2024, DNA from the two female dogs was also found on the victim. Four remaining purebred American Staffordshire Terriers and seven puppies from the kennel were handed in by the owner/breeder after the incident. The mayor also issued a lifelong ban on the American Staffordshire Terrier breed. The owner was found guilty of gross negligence manslaughter on March 7, 2024, and sentenced to 15 months in prison, 5 months actual prison time. The relatives of the victim were awarded partial damages of €40,000. The confiscation of the female dogs "Cookie" and "Peanut" requested by the public prosecutor's office was rejected by the judge. One dog lives with a new dog owner in Lower Austria and the other dog was placed in an animal shelter in Upper Austria. The prison sentence was later commuted to a fine of €1,800.
November 4, 2019	31, M	Belgian Shepherd of the variety: Malinois (2)	Lower Austria, Wiener Neustadt — The victim was tasked with feeding the military working dogs. The dogs with the pet names "Hati" and "Ragna" were found running loose by an officer. The dog handler who was tasked with bringing the dogs back found the victim dead in the dog's kennel. While "Hati" was euthanized, the younger dog "Ragna" was given back to his breeder and owner.
September 10, 2018	1, M	Rottweiler (1)	Vienna, Donaustadt — The dog "Joey" broke away from his intoxicated owner when he saw the child. The child died from his injuries in the hospital. The dog was taken to an animal shelter but later euthanized after attacking staff. A few months before the fatal incident, the dog had bitten someone else on the neck. The owner received an 18-month sentence, with 6 months actual prison time and a fine of €65,000.
April 24, 2014	62, F	Golden Retriever (1)	Burgenland — The woman was bitten on the upper arm by the neighbor's dog while she visited her sister-in-law. She died a week after the bite from multiple organ failure. A connection with the bite is suspected due to the timing, however the result of the autopsy was not made public.
February 5, 2010	79, F	Rottweiler (2)	Lower Austria, Lassee — The woman was attacked by her son's two dogs named "Aaron" and "Tico" (or "Diko"). She was later found dead by a caregiver of the dogs. The two dogs had been living in the victim's house for five years, and she had regular contact with the dogs. According to the police, there was one benign incident beforehand in which a person's hand was injured. Both dogs were euthanized.
August 14, 2009	1, F	Rottweiler (1)	Lower Austria, Staningersdorf — The victim was attacked by the father's dog named "Odin". When the police officer came home from work and wanted to greet the dog and his daughter, who came to him holding her grandmother's hand, the dog attacked the girl. The dog attacked without warning and bitten into her head. The father eventually managed to get her released from the dog and rushed her to hospital where she subsequently died. The dog was euthanized.
June 1987	<1	Rottweiler (1)	Vienna — The 4-month-old child was killed by the family dog. The owner's wife and daughter were acquitted. The dog was not euthanized after the incident. In 1989, this dog and a second Rottweiler acquired shortly after the death inflicted serious injuries on an 8-year-old boy who was playing with other children on a nearby property. The Vienna Regional Criminal Court and the Vienna Higher Regional Court (on appeal) found the defendant guilty of negligent grievous bodily harm under particularly dangerous circumstances.

== Fatalities due to rabies ==
Austria has been considered rabies-free since 2008. The last imported case of rabies occurred in 2004. A man was bitten by an infected dog in Morocco and died later in Austria. Worldwide, around 60,000 people die every year from rabies transmitted by dogs. If a person is injured by a dog suspected of being rabid, the local authority must be informed. In Austria, precautionary measures against the import of rabies are still in force. When entering Austria, dogs must be able to present a valid vaccination and, depending on the country of entry, an additional serological rabies test. Puppies may only be imported into Austria from the age of 16 weeks, as this type of vaccination is only possible from 12 weeks and the time until the vaccination becomes effective is 21 days. With a permit from the authorities, it is possible to import future assistance dogs, for example, at an earlier age if there is sufficient justification. There is also an exception for future federal service dogs.

== Legal situation in Austria ==
Fatal dog attacks can be classified as accidents, negligent homicides (Strafgesetzbuch § 80) or grossly negligent homicides (Strafgesetzbuch § 81), depending on the circumstances.

In cases of dog attacks that result in life-threatening injury to humans, Austrian authorities can seize the dog and order its euthanasia. If a dog has shown aggressive behavior, authorities typically initiate a character test (Wesenstest) to assess the dog. If the dog is classified as dangerous, it will likely be required to wear a muzzle and be kept on a leash. Euthanasia after a dog bite is extremely rare and only occurs if the dog poses a danger to the public. In 2018 the Rottweiler "Joey" broke away from its intoxicated owner and attacked a one-year-old boy who was walking on the other side of the street. The boy was seriously injured and died 18 days later in hospital. The dog was placed in an animal shelter, where they refused to euthanize a healthy animal and attempted to resocialize him. However, after the dog attacked the shelter staff, they decided to euthanize him after all.

== Law changes after incidents ==
Upper Austria 2024: An incident in 2023 in which 3 American Staffordshire Terriers mauled a female jogger to death while the dog owner was present but not able to control her dogs, led to several changes in the existing dog law.

- Every dog owner needs a certificate of competence (Sachkundenachweis) before getting a dog. Owners of large dogs that are heavier than 20 kg (~ 44 lb) or larger than 40 cm (~ 16 in) withers height have to pass an additional test that shows suitability for everyday life (Alltagstauglichkeitsprüfung). This test includes encounters with a group of people, cyclists, passing cars, joggers, skaters, other dogs, nordic walkers and baby strollers.
- Bull Terrier, American Staffordshire Terrier, Staffordshire Bull Terrier, Dogo Argentino, American Pit Bull Terrier and Tosa Inu and their crossbreeds are considered potentially dangerous dogs and they are legally considered large dogs according to § 5, regardless of their height at the withers and their weight.
- A dog owner is only permitted to walk a maximum of two large dogs at the same time.
- Breeding and training of dogs for the purpose of increasing their aggressiveness is prohibited.

Vienna 2018: Following the death of a 17-month-old boy named Waris, who was attacked while taking a walk with his grandparents and later died in hospital, the law was changed in the same year. The owner of the Rottweiler was intoxicated while walking the dog. On October 10, 2018, the then city councillor Ulli Sima (SPÖ) presented the 11th amendment to the Vienna Animal Welfare Act together with the Chief of Police Gerhard Pürstl. On November 29, 2018, the amendment to the Vienna Animal Welfare Act was passed.

The following amendments were adopted (selection):

- The enforcement of a ban on keeping animals was made easier. For example, it is now possible to issue a ban on keeping animals to a person who has disregarded the muzzle or leash requirement and whose dog has injured a person or an animal. Once a ban has been issued, this person may no longer live in the same household as the animal. This is to prevent animals from being passed on to family members.
- A certificate of competence (Sachkundenachweis) must be obtained before acquiring a new dog (from July 1, 2019).
- The requirements for obtaining a certificate of competence were extended (for example, no convictions for cruelty to animals are allowed).
- A muzzle and leash requirement was introduced in public places for certain breeds and dog types (from the age of 6 months). Exemption permits can be issued.

Mandatory sign with pictogram and German text: Leash and muzzle required. This sign can be seen on public places such as the subway in Vienna.

- Persons who are under the influence of alcohol (from 0.5 per mille) or narcotics are not allowed to lead certain breeds and dog types in public places. Public security officers have been authorized to test the breath of persons who are walking a certain dog in public places for alcohol content.
- The authorities must require dogs that have shown aggression to pass a test. To be able to take this test, ten training sessions with an animal welfare-qualified dog trainer must be presented.
- The practical part of the required test has been extended.
- The license for certain breeds and dog types (Mandatory Vienna Dog License) has been limited in time (one mandatory repetition of the test after 21 to 24 months). This mandatory dog license is necessary for the dog owner as well as for every person that handles the dog. The test must be done individually for each dog and each dog receives an individual dog card which has information like the microchip data on it. The dog handler must always carry the dog license and the dog card(s) as well as an identity card and present them during checks.
- In the event of serious bodily injury or death, the dog must be removed by authorities.
- In the event of a person being killed, the dog must be painlessly put down by law, unless the person bitten was at least grossly negligent in exposing themselves to the danger from the dog.
- Every dog owner must take out and maintain liability insurance for a sum of at least €725,000.

Salzburg 2013: On May 6, 2011, a four-year-old girl named Mia from Wals-Siezenheim was attacked and seriously injured by a Rottweiler that jumped over the fence into the family's garden. This incident was the trigger for an amendment to the Salzburg Provincial Safety Act. A registration requirement for dog owners was introduced, which stipulates a certificate of competence and mandatory liability insurance with a minimum cover amount. The amendment to the Salzburg Provincial Safety Act came into force in 2013.

Lower Austria 2009: There were several serious incidents involving dogs in the federal state of Lower Austria in 2009. For example, on September 2, a 3-year-old girl named Chiara was attacked and seriously injured by three Pit Bull Terriers in Rohrbach an der Gölsen and on November 13, a one-year-old girl named Hannah was killed by a Rottweiler. At the time, it was not legally possible to seize animals that endangered or injured people. These incidents put politicians under pressure to act. In response to these and other incidents, the Lower Austrian Dog Law (NÖ Hundehaltegesetz) was drawn up, which was passed in the provincial parliament session on November 19 and came into force on January 1, 2010. In addition to the general regulations on safe keeping and handling of dogs, further regulations were introduced for "dogs with increased risk potential and dogs with attack history".

Further amendments:

- The confiscation of a dog in the interests of public safety was enabled.
- The imposition of a ban on keeping dogs was enabled.
- Introduction of an obligation to register dog ownership with the municipality.
- Every dog owner must take out and maintain liability insurance.
- Introduction of proof of the necessary expertise in dog ownership (certificate of competence).
- The following dog types have been defined as dogs with increased risk potential: American Staffordshire Terrier, Bull Terrier, Bandog, Dogo Argentino, Pit Bull Terrier, Rottweiler, Tosa Inu, Staffordshire Bull Terrier, and crossbreeds of these dog types. It was planned to adapt this list by ordinance.
- No more than 2 dogs with an attack history or dogs with increased risk potential may be kept in one home.

== Legislation ==
Some federal states have created separate dog laws, others included the regulations on keeping dogs in their federal state security laws or police laws.

Overview of federal laws and ordinances on the keeping of dogs, dangerous dogs and dogs with increased risk potential (as of December 2024):

Federal State	Legal texts and ordinances
Salzburg	Law – Salzburg Provincial Safety Act § 19 Keeping dangerous dogs § 24 Handling a dangerous dog Ordinance (PDF) – Ordinance of the Salzburg State Government of October 22, 2012 on the training required for keeping dogs § 1 Training for the keeping of non-dangerous dogs § 2 Training for the keeping of dangerous dogs
Vienna	Law – Law on the keeping of animals (Vienna Animal Husbandry Act) § 5 Keeping of dogs Abs. 3 § 5a Keeping of dogs that require a dog license (Information in English) § 8 Keeping dangerous animals Abs. 7 – 9 § 8a Attack dog training
Vorarlberg	Law – Law on Local Security and Police Affairs § 4 Animal husbandry that requires a permit Ordinance of the provincial government on the keeping of fighting dogs §1 §2
Upper Austria	Dog Law – Law on the keeping of dogs in Upper Austria 2024 § 5 Large Dogs § 6 Dogs of special breeds § 7 Conspicuous dogs Ordinance – Ordinance of the Upper Austrian provincial government on dog ownership and the required training, testing and evaluation (Upper Austrian Dog Ownership Ordinance 2024 – Oö. HHVO 2024)
Tyrol	Law Police Law Tyrol § 6a Special obligations for keeping and handling of dogs
Styria	Law Styria Provincial Safety Act § 3b Keeping of animals Ordinance for proof of competence for dog keeping Styria; Individual municipalities may issue additional regulations for keeping dogs.
Carinthia	Law Carinthia Provincial Safety Act § 7 Keeping of dangerous animals § 8 Preventing danger when keeping dogs § 10 Special provisions for attack dogs § 11 Warnings § 12 Coercive measures, ban on keeping animals
Lower Austria	Law NÖ Dog Law 2023 § 2 Dogs with increased risk potential § 3 Dogs with attack history Ordinance for keeping dogs in Lower Austria 2023
Burgenland	Law Burgenland Provincial Safety Act § 22 Keeping of dogs with attack history
Austria	Law Austrian Animal Protection Law § 14 Carers of animals § 24a Identification and registration of dogs and breeding cats

== See also ==
- List of wolf attacks
- List of fatal dog attacks in Germany
- List of fatal dog attacks
- Breed-specific legislation
- Dog aggression
- Dog behavior
- Dog bite
