= Otjomuise =

Suburb of Windhoek, Namibia

Otjomuise Otjiherero
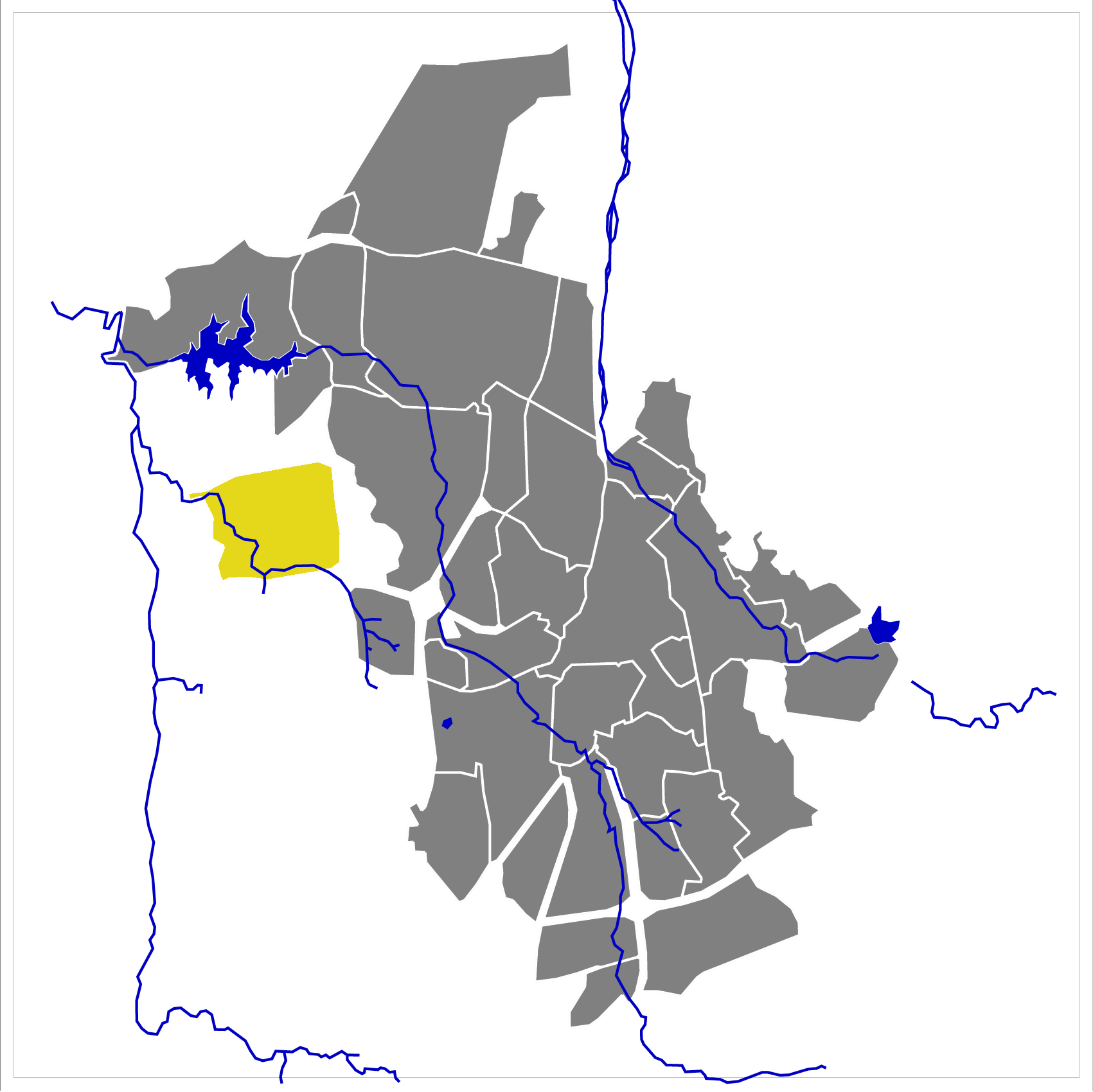
- Coordinates: 22°33′11″S 17°01′16″E

Otjomuise (lit. 'place of steam' in Otjiherero) is a township in north-western Windhoek, Namibia.

== 8ste Laan ==
8ste Laan (lit. '8th Street' in Afrikaans) is an unincorporated informal settlement adjacent to the Otjomuise residential area. The City of Windhoek claims that the land is meant for recreational purposes and not for housing. It served the shack owners with evictions because the occupation of erf 4421 on which the 8ste Laan's shacks have been erected was not authorized by them.

Despite this controversy the 8ste Laan community has a gardening project that supplies Khomasdal soup kitchens with vegetables. This gardening project was launched by the founding father of Namibia, Dr Sam Nujoma, to stop people from depending on the government.
