= Bull Arab =

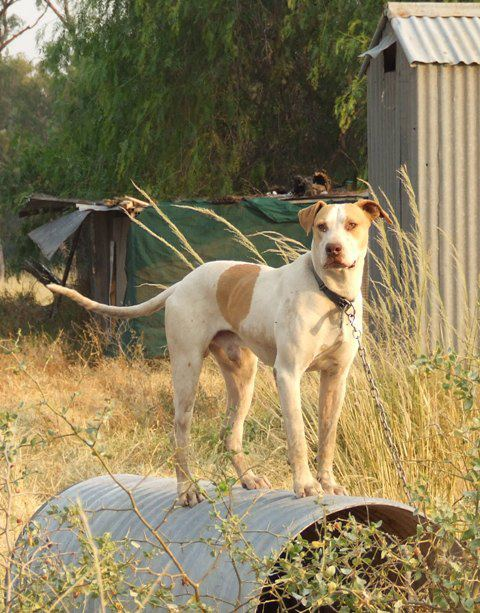
- Other names: Australian Bull Arab, Bullarab
- Origin: Australia
- Breed status: Not recognised as a breed by any major kennel club.
Traits
- Weight: 30–50 kg (66–110 lb)
- Coat: Short
- Color: White with black, liver, tan or brindle patches

The Bull Arab is an Australian breed of dog, developed in the 1970s for pig hunting. The breed was originally established through the crossing of 50% Bull Terrier, 25% Greyhound, and 25% German Shorthaired Pointer, a mix that combined speed, strength, scenting ability, and trainability. This original combination is still reflected in older bloodlines, though later additions in certain bloodlines include Great Dane, Bloodhound and Mastiff, with variations being made depending on the sort of country hunting took place on.

The Australian Bullarab Breeder's Association was launched in 2007, acting as the breed's parent club, with the ultimate goal of achieving ANKC recognition.

== History ==
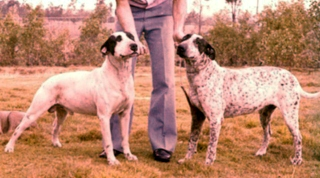
A pair of Greyhound x GSP x Bull Terrier dogs, the ancestors to what we know now as Bull Arabs

=== Origins and development ===
The Bull Arab begun development in Queensland, Australia in 1972 by breeder Mike Errol Hodgens. His original breeding formula combined 50% Bull Terrier, 25% Greyhound, and 25% German Shorthaired Pointer. The goal was to create a dog capable of locating, chasing, and holding feral pigs across rugged Australian landscape.

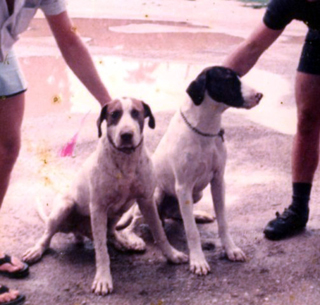
A 1970s pair of Hodgens' Bull Arabs, marking the beginning of the defined Bull Arab phenotype

Hodgens dedicated over a decade to refining the breed, reportedly producing hundreds of dogs annually at the height of his operation. He faced significant personal and legal challenges during this time, including animal seizures and disputes with authorities, which ultimately led him to step away from breeding in 1989. Despite this, the breed gained a solid foothold among rural hunters.

=== Evolution and regional adaptations ===
After Hodgens ceased breeding, various hunters and breeders across Queensland and New South Wales began developing their own lines based on his original dogs. Some breeders introduced additional breeds such as Mastiff, Great Dane, or Bloodhound to suit different terrain and hunting needs. For example, breeders in Queensland often prioritized scenting ability by incorporating Bloodhound, while those in NSW sought greater size and strength for mountainous terrain by introducing Mastiff blood.

Notable breeders and early supporters of the breed include Brian Neal, Peter Paulsen, Graham Caldow, Johnny Johnson, and Reece Campbell, among others. These individuals were instrumental in maintaining and adapting the breed over the decades.

=== Breed standardization efforts ===
In 2007, the Australian Bullarab Breeder's Association (ABBA) was established to promote the breed and work towards recognition by the Australian National Kennel Council (ANKC). The group also advocates for responsible breeding practices and aims to preserve the Bull Arab's working capabilities.

== Appearance ==
The Australian Bullarab Breeder's Association (ABBA) have published a written breed standard for the Bull Arab, with dogs needing to meet the standard in order to be registered.

=== General appearance and characteristics ===
The breed standard describes the Bull Arab as a dog for agility and endurance. The breed standard allows for working scars to be present during show evaluation. It has a symmetrical frame and a curved outline.

=== Height and weight ===
There is sexual dimorphism within the Bull Arab, with the allowable heights and weights for males and females differing slightly.

The ideal height for males is 63–69 cm, with ideal weight range being 32–42 kg. Meanwhile, in females, the ideal height is 61–66 cm, with the ideal weight between 30 and 40 kg.

=== Disqualifications ===
Bull Arabs falling outside the parameters of what is deemed the breed standard may be submitted for registration with ABBA and will be thoroughly evaluated and given consideration for acceptance. However, not all Bull Arabs will be accepted.

== Temperament ==
The ABBA standard for the Bull Arab indicate that the ideal temperament should be "kind and loyal, balanced and placid nature, intelligent and independent, and have strong drive and determination when worked and a busy work ethic".

It is noted that the breed "must not show any signs of aggressiveness towards other dogs and under no circumstance towards other people."

== Use ==
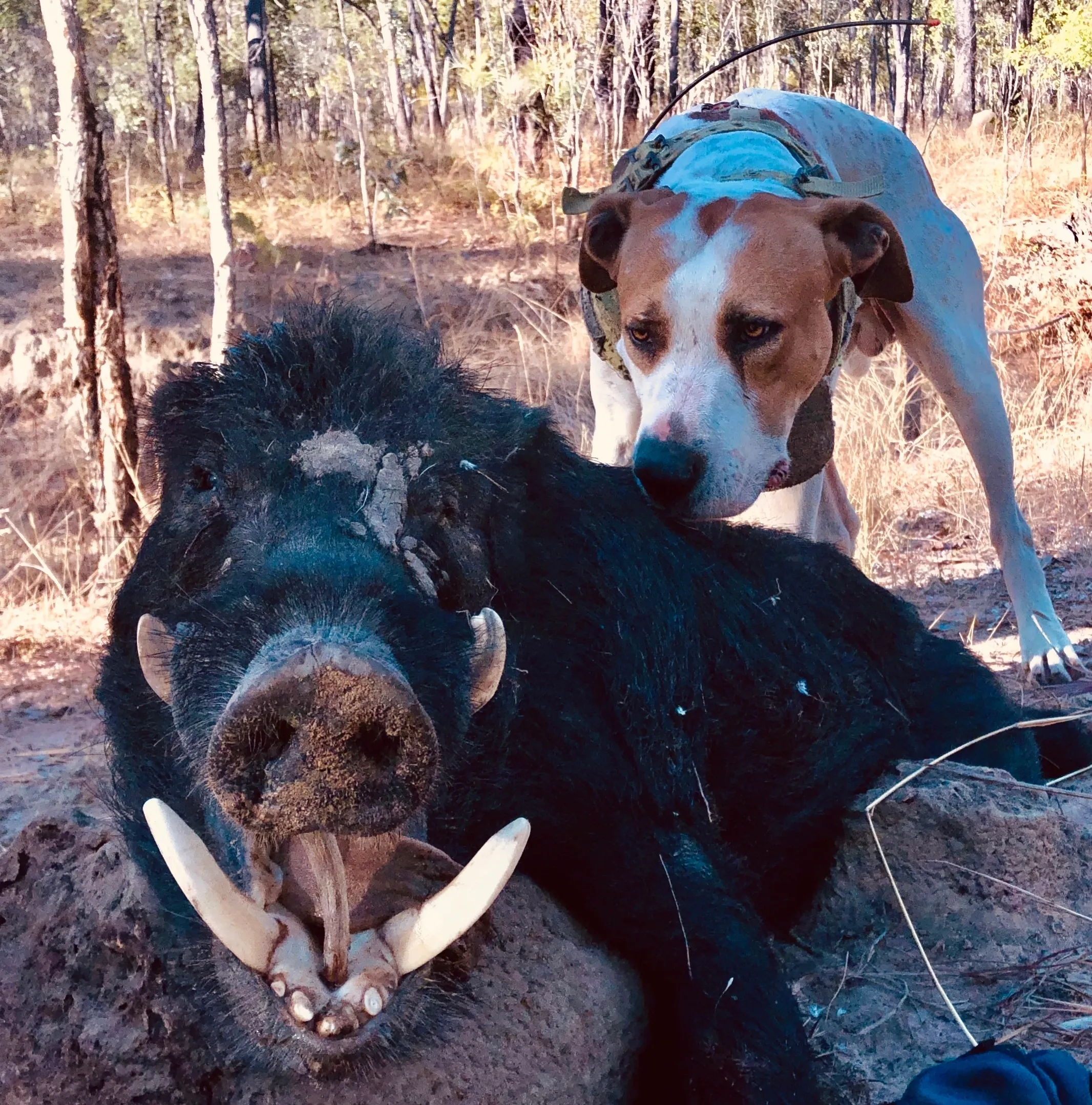
A Bull Arab photographed next to a feral pig

The Bull Arab is predominately kept as a pig hunting dog. While the breed was originally started in Queensland, there is a growing population all over Australia. A pig hunting dog is used to locate feral pigs, pull them to the ground, and hold them by the ear. The breed is able to locate pigs as far as 4–6 kilometers (2.5–3.7 mi) away by smell.

== Mislabeling and controversies ==
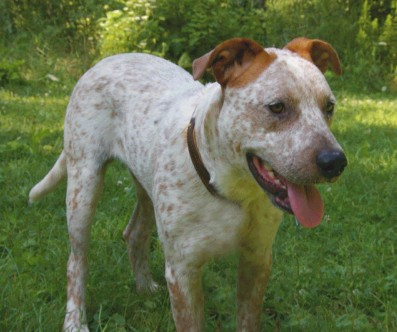

Despite the Bull Arabs primary breed purpose as a pig hunting dog, there are many Bull Arabs that have become companions and pets, due to what is described as their "loyal, gentle, and sweet natures". However, with this growing reputation in family homes, comes a growing need for awareness surrounding what a Bull Arab truly is. Many dogs referred to as "Bull Arabs" in media and shelters are not Bull Arabs recognized by ABBA, and are instead only crosses or mixed breed dogs that loosely resemble the breed. This distinction complicates efforts to track behavior or welfare outcomes specific to the registered breed, versus those only relevant to Bull Arab-type dogs.

=== Animal welfare issues ===
Data published by dog rescues and animal welfare organizations often indicate that Bull Arab-type dogs, as well as pig hunting-type mixes in general, are bred irresponsibly, dumped often and are more difficult to rehome responsibly in their home state of Queensland. Bull Arab-type dogs are the third most common types of dogs taken in by RSPCA Queensland, with many of these dogs being mixed breeds who are not representative of the true Bull Arab population.

The RSPCA also attributes this to a perceived rise in pig hunting, with hunters not desexing their animals, resulting in litters often being dumped.

=== Breed-specific legislation and bite risks ===
The perceived risk of Bull Arabs and Bull Arab-type crosses has been a topic of contention in the general public in recent years, likely echoing stigma regarding other "bully" breeds, such as the Staffordshire Bull Terrier, and the restricted American Pit Bull Terrier, despite neither breed being recognised in the foundation stock for Bull Arabs.

The Mackay Regional Council reports pig hunting dogs are not represented in greater numbers of dog bites than other dog breeds. In a 2022 analysis of 682 dog bite related injuries who presented to Sydney Children's Hospital in New South Wales from 2010 to 2020, no bites were attributed to Bull Arabs, though Bull Arabs are not within the 20 most common breeds in New South Wales. Despite this, there has been previous cases of attacks on animals and humans attributed to Bull Arab-type dogs within Australia.

The RSPCA has stated in reference to the Bull Arab, as well as other bully breeds, that "there has been no scientific evidence to support that certain dog breeds are more dangerous than others. Rather, the responsibility lies purely with the dog owner to ensure that their pet is socialised, trained and treated appropriately. The community should also be aware of just how to interact with dogs in public and the home. Any dog can make a loving, devoted pet; regardless of their breed or appearance".

== See also ==
- List of dog breeds
