= List of fatal dog attacks in Germany =

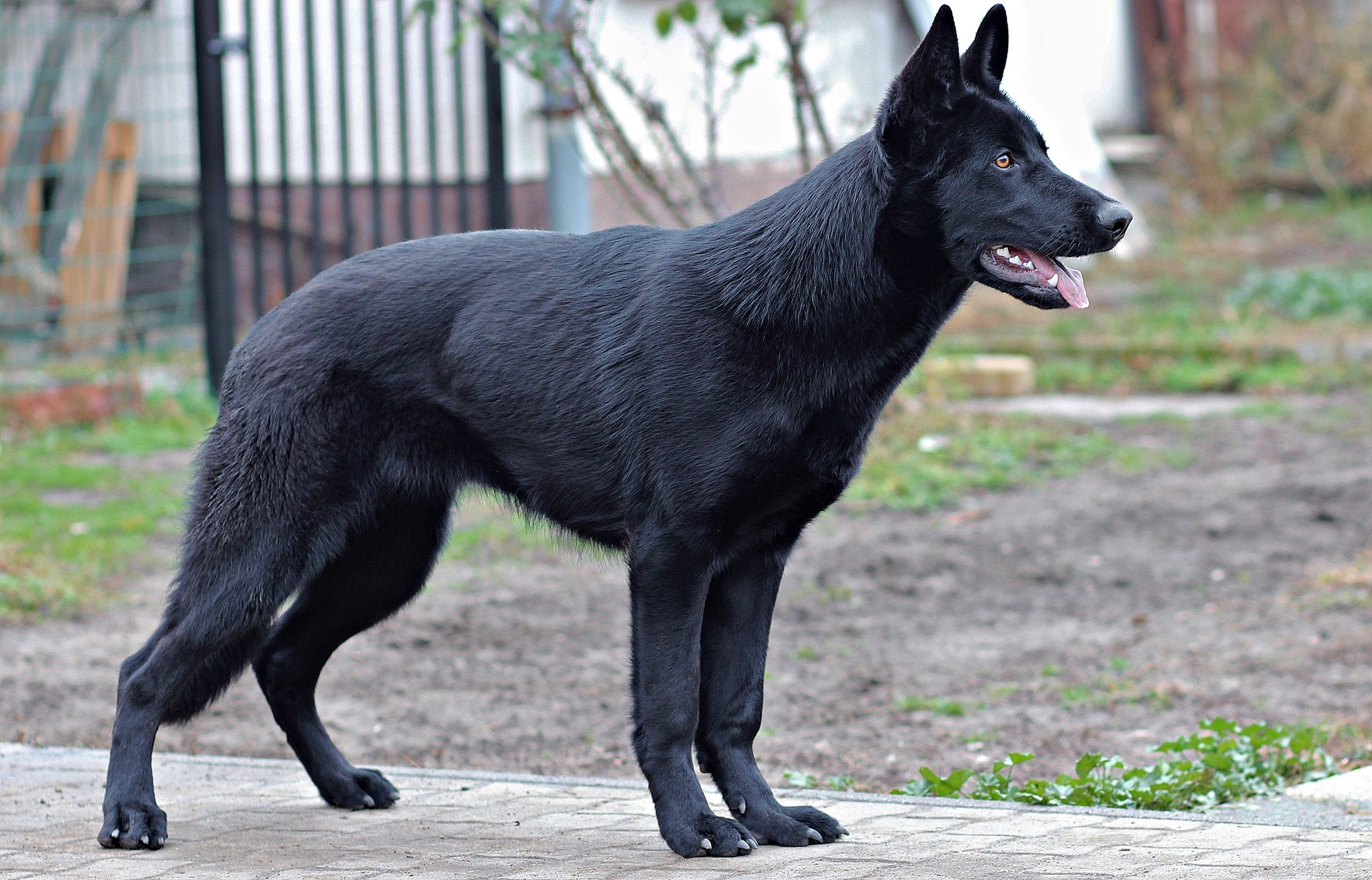
The German Shepherd is a breed that originated in Germany.

This is a list of human deaths caused by dogs, which became publicly known in the form of reports, cause of death statistics, scientific papers, or other sources. For more information on causes of death and studies related to dog bite-related fatalities, see Fatal dog attacks.

Since 1998 deaths have been collected according to ICD-10 International Statistical Classification of Diseases and Related Health Problems. With the help of cause-of-death statistics, recommendations for action and strategies can be derived, for example, for epidemiological research, prevention of deaths, and so on. Deaths from or after dog bites are very rare, they count as preventable deaths. W 54: Bitten or Struck by dog is the classification according to ICD-10.

According to an evaluation of the number of deaths in the period from 2009 to 2019, an average of 3.3 people died per year throughout Germany. The states of Rhineland-Palatinate, Schleswig-Holstein, Bremen and Saarland had no deaths during this period. In 2005, 2007, 2008, 2009, 2011, 2012 and 2019, there were no deaths nationwide, according to statistics.

== Summary counts of fatalities by year ==
Deaths per year according to the Federal Statistical Office of Germany:

2000. 6
2001. 4
2002. 4
2003. 5
2004. 3
2005. 0
2006. 5
2007. 0
2008. 0
2009. 0
2010. 8
2011. 0
2012. 0
2013. 3
2014. 4
2015. 5
2016. 4
2017. 4
2018. 6
2019. 0
2020. 6
2021. 5
2022. 4
2023. 3
2024. 3

== Fatalities from 2000 to current ==
Date	Victim	Dog type (Number)	Location — Circumstances
July 8, 2026	4, F	American Staffordshire Terrier	Saxony-Anhalt, Osternienburger Land, Anhalt-Bitterfeld, Drosa —A girl was bitten several times by the family dog and died at the scene. Adult family members struggled to get the dog to release the girl. The dog was taken to a shelter after the incident. According to the mayor, there had been a biting incident in the past, but the dog passed the so-called temperament test and stayed with the family.
January 2026	33, M	American Bully XL	Lower Saxony, Lohne — A passerby discovered a dead man with severe bite wounds in a ditch. The dog behaved aggressively toward the police and emergency services. The dog was taken to an animal shelter.
January 24, 2024	35, M	American Bully XL	Schleswig-Holstein, Geesthacht — According to the police, the dog had already seriously injured the owner's partner two weeks earlier when she fell on the icy road. The man was found by a passerby, he was covered in blood and suffered serious injuries to both his arms. When the officers arrived, the dog was sitting next to the 35-year-old. The dog then aggressively charged the paramedics who tried to help. The police shot the dog. The man died in hospital.
January 9, 2024 January 10 †	88, F	German Shepherd	Saxony-Anhalt, Halberstadt, Emersleben — The woman was discovered with hypothermia and bite wounds. She died the next day. The autopsy concluded that she died from blood loss. The charges of involuntary manslaughter against the 53-year-old dog owner and breeder were dropped in August 2024. The investigation revealed that the dog was in a closed kennel on private property and could not have gotten out on its own. It remained unclear why the victim went into the kennel. The dog was not euthanized.
April 6, 2023	81, M	English Bulldog (4)	Brandenburg, Worin — The victim was bitten by the neighbor's four dogs while mowing the lawn. He suffered severe injuries to his arms and legs and died in hospital four weeks later.
January 10, 2023	87, F	American Bully	Rhineland-Palatinate, Neuhofen, Rheinauen — According to the police, the woman wanted to carry a package to her relatives' house when the family dog she knew well grabbed it. The relatives saw the attack but were unable to stop it in time. The woman died at the scene. The dog had not previously been noticed as aggressive. The police believe it was an accident. The dog was seized by the public order office and taken to an animal shelter. It was decided to euthanize the dog when resocialization was not possible.
April 10, 2018	<1, M	Pit bull type	Hesse, Bad König — The family dog "Kowu" bit the 7-month-old infant in the head, it died later in the hospital. Police described the dog as a possible Staffordshire mix.
April 2018	52, F	American Staffordshire Terrier cross	Hanover — The dog owner's sisters saw a lifeless body lying on the floor through the apartment window. Firefighters broke into the apartment and found the two victims covered in blood. The dog named "Chico" was taken to a shelter. Nearly 300,000 people signed the online petitions demanding that the dog be rescued and that it be given a chance for resocialization. The case was also made explosive by the fact that the dog was already known to the responsible authorities. Neighbors had already complained years ago about the barking and reported that he was not kept in a manner appropriate to the species. The dog was later euthanized.
April 2018	27, M	American Staffordshire Terrier cross	
2018	52, F	Unknown	Lower Saxony — The woman sustained a minor injury from a dog bite and died due to an infection with capnocytophaga canimorsus 4 to 6 days later.
December 16, 2017	47, M	Rottweiler	Saxony, Chemnitz, Roßwein — The man was attacked while walking the dog. His mother tried to get the dog away from him, which took about 15 minutes. He died due to blood loss.
May 30, 2017	72, F	Kangal	Baden-Württemberg, Sigmaringen, Stetten am kalten Markt — According to the public prosecutor's office, the Kangal attacked the victim when she passed the property on a footpath where the dog was kept. He killed her with bites to the head and neck. Police killed the dog.
November 8, 2011	62, M	Dobermann	Thuringia, Nordhausen, Wülfingerode — The son found his father, bitten to death by his own dog. It is unclear why the dog attacked the man.
October 10, 2010	57, F	Rottweiler x German Shepherd	Thuringia, Sömmerda, Kindelbrück — The family dog attacked and killed the woman. The dog was euthanized.
September 2010	3, M	Rottweiler	Saxony-Anhalt, Wittenberg, Zörnigall — The boy was visiting his great-grandmother who was caring for the dog named "Spike", the pet of the boy's father. The boy had known the dog since birth. The police shot the animal several times to clear the way for the emergency doctor to get to the boy.
May 21, 2010	3, F	American Staffordshire Terrier (4)	Thuringia, Oldisleben-Sachsenburg — The girl was attacked by her aunt's dogs. The great-grandmother came to the rescue of the girl and was seriously injured. All dogs were euthanized by authorities with the aunt's consent. The aunt was charged with negligent homicide. The Nordhausen district court has sentenced the dog owner to one year of probation and 80 hours of community service for negligent homicide.
April 2010	<1, F	Husky x German Shepherd	Brandenburg, Cottbus, Saspow — The family dog named "Bingo" knocked over the stroller and attacked the 8-week-old child. The dog was brought to an animal shelter. His assessment showed no signs of increased aggressiveness towards people and animals, he was not euthanized. The owners agreed to rehome the dog.
November 2006	<1	Rottweiler	Lower Saxony, Cuxhaven, Samtgemeinde Land Hadeln — The dog of a family member opened the door to the room where the 4-month-old child was and attacked it. The dog was euthanized the same day.
July 24, 2006	92, F	American Staffordshire Terrier	Saxony-Anhalt, Gross Rossau — The woman was bitten by the dog and succumbed to her injuries on the spot. The dog's owner was on vacation at the time of the incident. The dog sitter let the dog run around freely on the property where the woman lived. The reason for the attack is unclear.
December 31, 2005; January 6, 2006 †	69, M	Unknown	Brandenburg — The man sustained a minor injury from a bite by his dog and died a few days later due to an infection with capnocytophaga canimorsus.
December 1, 2004	36, F	Pit Bull	Bremen — The victim was killed in her apartment by her dog. An arriving police officer killed the dog.
December 2002	86, F	Rottweiler	Brandenburg, Senzig — When the woman brought water to the dog named "Brando", she was bitten and died a little later from her injuries. The dog was euthanized.
November 2002	<1, M	Rottweiler	Saxony-Anhalt, Hobeck — The 6-week-old child was in the yard in its stroller and started crying. The family dog knocked the stroller over and killed the infant. The father shot the dog with a hunting rifle.
May 2, 2002	24, M	Labrador mix	Baden-Wuerttemberg, Untergruppenbach — When a Jack Russell Terrier and a Labrador mix began fighting over a stick, the dog owner tried to protect the Jack Russell. The Labrador mix snapped and injured the man's carotid artery. The man panicked due to the profuse bleeding and ran away, leaving his companions unable to help him. He bled to death before the rescue workers arrived.
March 28, 2002	6, M	Rottweiler (2)	Rhineland-Palatinate, Zweibrücken — An adult woman and a boy were walking the dogs in the forest. When he fell, the unleashed female dog charged at him and bit. The male dog then got out of the collar and bit as well. The child died on the spot.
August 8, 2001	11, F	German Shepherd	Schleswig-Holstein, Lutzhorn — The girl was playing in the garden with the family dog when she was bitten several times and died.
June 26, 2000	6, M	Pitbull American staffordshire Mischling	Hamburg — Two dogs jumped into a schoolyard and attacked about ten children, leaving two injured and one dead. The dogs were shot dead by responding police and two people were arrested. Following this, another fatal dog attack earlier the same year, and a long series of serious injuries caused by fighting dogs, the German government enacted laws banning certain breeds, including penalties of up to 100,000 Deutsche Marks (US$48,100). See: Volkan Kaya (in German)
June 26, 2000	6, M	Pit Bull	Hamburg — Two dogs jumped into a schoolyard and attacked about ten children, leaving two injured and one dead. The dogs were shot dead by responding police and two people were arrested. Following this, another fatal dog attack earlier the same year, and a long series of serious injuries caused by fighting dogs, the German government enacted laws banning certain breeds, including penalties of up to 100,000 Deutsche Marks (US$48,100). See: Volkan Kaya (in German)
March 5, 2000	86, F	Rottweiler	North Rhine-Westphalia, Gladbeck, Rentfort-Nord —The victim was taking out the trash when the dog attacked her. The dog bit into the pensioner's head and neck and severed her cervical spine. Neighbors rushed over and hit the animal with spades but couldn't save the injured woman. According to the public prosecutor's office, the daughter of a Rottweiler breeder was taking a walk with three Rottweilers who were not on a leash in the early hours of the morning. The dog named "Easy" disappeared for a while and returned to the nearby breeding grounds by herself. The dog had attacked and injured a child three years before the fatal attack. The Essen public prosecutor's office alleged negligent homicide. The 21-year-old was sentenced to ten months for negligent homicide (juvenile sentence to probation).
May 11, 1998	48, F	Pit bull (2)	Brandenburg, Uckermark, Milow — She was in front of her house with her two dogs. When a 13-year-old girl cycled past the property, her dogs chased after the girl. When the owner tried to stop the dogs they turned on her and killed her.
April 27, 1998	6, F	Rottweiler	Mecklenburg-Vorpommern, Güstrow — The dog bit the girl in the neck area and dragged her around after she fell into the area where the dogs where kept.
1996	53, F	Pit bull	Hesse, Darmstadt — The dog bit the woman in the neck area and did not let go.
June 1995	86, F	American Staffordshire Terrier	Hesse, Frankfurt am Main, Praunheim — The victim was attacked by a dog around noon and died at the hospital. The dog owner was sentenced to 9 month imprisonment in 1996. The dog had a history of aggression and was classified as dangerous in 1994.

== Fatalities without being bitten or struck by a dog ==
This list includes deaths where the dog did not approach or injure the victim directly (e.g. traffic accidents caused by loose or stray dogs or transmitted diseases).

Date	Victim	Dog type (Number)	Location — Circumstances
December 2022	40, M	Labrador	North Rhine-Westphalia, Weeze —A racing cyclist collided with another cyclist's dog while overtaking him and fell. He died a few days later in hospital. The police believe it was a tragic accident because the dog did not run towards the racing cyclist.
August 2018	63, M	Undisclosed	Bremen — A 63-year-old man contracted the bacterium Capnocytophaga canimorsus from his dog's saliva. He was not injured by his dog. He died of multiple organ failure.
February 2012	56, M	German Shepherd (4)	Baden-Württemberg, Adelmannsfelden — Four dogs escaped their owner when he tried to put them in their compound and attacked a 47-year-old female jogger. The dog's owner suffered a heart attack as he rushed to restrain the dogs. The injured jogger, along with others, administered first aid but he died at the scene.

== Death of Volkan Kaya ==
On June 26, 2000, a six-year-old boy was killed by two pit bulls named Zeus and Gipsy on a playground in Hamburg. His death sparked an intense debate throughout Germany about the introduction of a fighting dog breed ordinance (dt. Kampfhundeverordnung). This ultimately resulted in the passing of the Act on the Restriction of the Movement or Import of Dangerous Dogs into Germany (dt. Gesetz zur Beschränkung des Verbringens oder der Einfuhr gefährlicher Hunde in das Inland) and the tightening of existing dog laws at federal level. The act banned such breeds as pit bull terrier, American Staffordshire Terrier, Staffordshire Bull Terrier, Bull Terrier and their mixes. The attack sparked great public outrage and made headlines across Germany for years.

== See also ==
- List of wolf attacks
- Breed-specific legislation
