= Mayfield Park, Gauteng =

Mayfield Park
- Location within Gauteng Location within South Africa
- Coordinates: 26.317°S 28.015°E
- Country: South Africa
- Province: Gauteng
- Municipality: City of Johannesburg
- Main Place: Johannesburg

Area
  - Total: 1.12 km^{2} (0.43 sq mi)

Population (2011)
  - Total: 1,229
  - Density: 1,100/km^{2} (2,840/sq mi)

Racial makeup (2011)
  - Black African: 32.5%
  - Coloured: 8.5%
  - Indian/Asian: 7.7%
  - White: 50.3%
  - Other: 1.0%

First languages (2011)
  - English: 51.3%
  - Afrikaans: 17.3%
  - Zulu: 9.8%
  - Sotho: 6.3%
  - Other: 15.4%
- Time zone: UTC+2 (SAST)
- Postal code (street): 2091

Mayfield Park is a suburb of Johannesburg, South Africa. It is located in Region F of the City of Johannesburg Metropolitan Municipality. The area code is 2091. It is home to South Downs Country Club and the Klipriviersberg Nature Reserve. The Klip River runs through the suburb.
