= Fatal dog attacks =

Dog attack resulting in a human victim's death

Fatal dog attacks are human victim's deaths caused by dogs. The study of fatal dog attacks can lead to prevention techniques which can help to reduce all dog bite injuries, not only fatalities. Dog bites and attacks can result in pain, bruising, wounds, bleeding, soft tissue injury, broken bones, loss of limbs, scalping, disfigurement, life-threatening injuries, and death.

== Causes of death in dog bite related fatalities ==
There are several ways a person can die from a dog bite or a dog attack, including:

- Air embolism
- Blunt force trauma, usually to the head, is more common with infants or small children
- Cervical fracture of the spine (broken neck)
- Decapitation, the removal of the head or brain from the rest of the spine
- Heart attack brought on by exertion during a dog attack, from loss of blood pressure due to bleeding, from the stress of an attack, or resultant injuries
- Hemorrhage/exsanguination, loss of blood through severing an artery or vein, or from bleeding out from multiple wounds, or bleeding for an excessive time before victim is found
- Sepsis from bite wounds

== Risk factors ==
- An attack by more than one dog. A person attacked by multiple dogs will have more difficulties to defend themselves effectively against the dogs, increasing the likelihood of sustaining severe injuries. In addition, the behavior of a pack of dogs differs significantly from that of a solitary dog; if one dog within a pack initiates an attack, it is more probable that others will join in. Furthermore it is more challenging for bystanders or first responders to intervene and stop an attack involving multiple dogs, especially if the dogs are highly aggressive or in a frenzied state.
- Victim is alone at the time of the attack.
- Lack of awareness that dogs can see infants as prey.
- Responsible ownership, including proper care, socialization, training, and supervision of dogs, plays a crucial role in preventing fatal attacks. Owners who fail to fulfill these responsibilities increase the risk of their dogs posing a danger to others. Fatal attacks often occur when dogs are left unsupervised or improperly restrained.
- Certain characteristics of a victim may increase the risk of a fatal dog attack, such as age (young children and the elderly are more vulnerable) or physical condition. If an older person is pushed over by a dog and sustains serious injuries such as fractures, head trauma, or internal injuries, these injuries can be life-threatening, particularly if they are not promptly treated or if the individual has underlying health issues that complicate their recovery.
- Dogs with a history of aggression, whether towards humans or other animals, are at a higher risk of being involved in fatal attacks. Past incidents of aggression should be taken seriously and addressed through appropriate training and management.
- The type of dog involved in the attack. Large and heavily built dogs are more prone to inflict severe injuries that lead to the death of the victim. Moreover, certain dog types exhibit distinct biting styles and prove exceptionally challenging to intervene once an attack has commenced. If the victims survives, extensive surgery and lifelong treatment often becomes necessary. Small dogs generally have less physical strength and lower bite force, which may lead to less severe injuries and a lower risk of mortality.
- People with asplenia, hyposplenia or people suffering from alcoholism have a higher risk of developing fulminant bacterial sepsis caused by a dog bite injury, a minor dog bite injury, a scratch or even just the contact with a dog's saliva and the bacteria capnocytophaga canimorsus.

== Forensic investigation ==
Determining the cause of death and understanding the extent of injuries often requires detailed forensic analysis, including examination of bite marks, trauma patterns, and other physical evidence. Fatal dog attacks often necessitate collaboration between forensic pathologists, forensic experts (DNA analysis), odontologists (for bite mark analysis), behavioral experts, animal control officers, and law enforcement to comprehensively assess the circumstances surrounding the incident. These cases can involve certain complexities, such as determining liability, identifying the dog or dogs that attacked, and assessing any negligence on the part of owners or other parties involved.

Whether a dog owner is legally responsible for a fatal dog attack depends on various factors, including the jurisdiction's laws and the circumstances surrounding the incident. In many places, dog owners can be held liable for injuries or fatalities caused by their dogs. Proving that a specific dog attacked can be necessary to hold someone legally responsible. Physical evidence such as saliva, fur, or skin cells left behind at the scene of the bite can be collected and analyzed for DNA matching to determine if it matches the suspected dog. Experts may examine the bite marks on the victim's body to assess characteristics such as size, shape, and pattern, which can sometimes be matched to the dental impressions of a specific dog. Since this methods can't always be applied (efforts to keep the victim alive for example can erase a dog’s biological traces), researchers from Italy suggested an additional method to prove the involvement of a specific dog. They suggested to detect the victim's profile in the dog's mouth through buccal swabs on the suspected dog. Further methods to identify an offending dog include witness statements, CCTV footage, 3D modelling to show matches between the wound and a specific dog's dental arches (applicable if the dogs in question have different characteristics) or genetic analysis of the dog hairs.

== Published research ==
Scientists, scholars, medical personnel, veterinarians, and lawmakers have been documenting the societal problem of fatal dog attacks for several decades in an effort to identify causes and come up with solutions.

=== South America & India ===
==== 2023 research: AMBIO A Journal of the Human Environment ====
Stray dog attacks are very common in India and other countries with a high population of free-ranging dogs. Since these attacks frequently lead to deaths, governments are under pressure to address the problem. Researchers from Argentina and India looked at problems related to free-ranging dogs in exemplary regions in South America and India. Free-ranging dogs can carry and transmit diseases such as rabies, which can be fatal to humans if not treated promptly. The researchers argue for evidence-based legislation and consensus-building, among other measures, to mitigate the negative impacts of free-ranging dogs, thereby reducing potential harm to humans and other animals.

=== Brazil ===
==== 2022 study: Frontiers in Pediatrics - General Pediatrics and Pediatric Emergency Care ====
Researchers looked at the epidemiological profile of dog attacks to patients under 14 years old assisted at the pediatric referral emergency unit of a tertiary hospital in Campinas, Brazil. This study did not find any death records at this hospital, but made a note on the age of the victims of fatal dog attacks: "Some accidents might be serious and result in death, while accidents, even if not so serious, might result in irreversible consequences. There is some evidence that 56% of casualties related to dog bites occur with children under 16 years old."

=== Europe ===
==== 2023 study: Bitten or struck by dog – an increasingly common diagnosis ====
The Swedish scientists looked at the consequences of dog bites and deaths caused by dogs. Fatal dog attacks are rare in Sweden, but as in other European countries, there is an increasing trend. The severity of the damage caused by dogs ranges from scratches to loss of limbs. Attacks by several dogs and by certain types of dogs are described as particularly dangerous. The researchers came to the conclusion that certain types of dogs cause particularly serious injuries due to their way of biting, holding and shaking the victim. The Rottweiler, American Bulldog, Cane Corso, Japanese Tosa and Pit Bull are named as dogs that can kill an adult human without difficulty. Breeds such as the American Staffordshire Terrier, the Rottweiler and the German Shepherd caused the most serious injuries in the studies mentioned. The Swedish deaths in 2018 and 2019 were caused by a dog of the American Bulldog breed and a dog of the American Staffordshire Terrier/Rottweiler crossbreed.

The researchers recommend that physicians treating minors with injuries from a dog attack notify the competent social authorities, as they consider the risk of further incidents to be increased. In 2022, a dog owner in Sweden was killed by her American Staffordshire Terrier. The same dog had attacked and severely bitten her two-year-old grandson two years earlier, but the police stopped the investigation and no report was made to the relevant authorities.

The authors see a change in the way people keep and interact with dogs, as well as a higher proportion of high-risk breeds in the population, as a possible explanation for the increase in fatalities. Strongly built and "hard biting" dogs are very popular in Sweden and, according to the authors, pose a serious risk when kept in families with children. Older people are also considered to be particularly susceptible to attacks by powerfully built dogs. The scientists refer to an Australian study which states that the risk of injury from being pushed by a dog is particularly high in older people. The authors see imported and smuggled dogs as a further health risk, as they often appear in cases of assault and carry the additional risk of rabies infection.

==== 2022 study: Forensic Science International ====
The authors of the study "Bitten or struck by dog: A rising number of fatalities in Europe, 1995–2016" looked at data officially recorded by Eurostat with the ICD-10 cause of death code W54 Bitten or struck by dog for 30 European countries. This data excludes death due to complications after dog bites like infections. For 2016 they found 45 recorded deaths, corresponding to a rate of 0.009 per 100,000 residents. They come to the conclusion that "the number of European fatalities due to dog attacks increased significantly at a rate of several % per year 1995–2016." The looked at the impact of age, gender and geography. They state that people younger than 10 and older than 39 are more likely to be killed by dogs and male victims are overpresented in certain age groups and regions. The study names Hungary, France, Romania, UK, Poland and Finland as high-incidence countries. Severe and fatal dog attacks have in common that the dog or dogs involved carry out multiple, targeted bites (focused bites to bring the victim down and subsequent bites to the neck and face) and shaking until the victim ceases movement. It is also described that difficulties to stop a dog from attacking are common in fatal attacks. The researchers suggest more detailed national and regional studies to be carried out, since the increase in death could not be explained by the population increase of humans and dogs. The data available for this study lacked details of the circumstances and contributing factors of a fatal attack. They mention that research by other scientists utilizing media reports, legal proceedings, and surveys has already shed some light on the contexts of these fatal incidents.

==== 2018 study: Journal of Veterinary Behavior ====
In the study "Fatal dog attacks in Spain under a breed-specific legislation: A ten-year retrospective study" researchers from Spain and Chile examined fatal dog attacks that occurred in Spain within a ten-year period. They analyzed data from records of fatal dog attacks in Spain from 2004 to 2013 and examined the interplay among factors related to the victim, the dog, and the circumstances of the attack. A secondary aim was to assess the consistency between the dogs implicated in fatal attacks and those identified in Spanish legislation as potentially dangerous dogs (perros potencialmente peligrosos). Fatal dog bites in Spain average 1.6 deaths annually, corresponding to a rate of 0.003 per 100,000 residents. The study identified 16 cases of fatal dog attacks resulting in 17 deaths, with a predominance of male victims. The mean age of the victims is 46 years, with significant representation from both older adults and young children. Fatal attacks occur across multiple provinces, with Barcelona showing the highest incidence followed by Tenerife. According to the study many of the dogs involved in these fatal incidents are classified as potentially dangerous dogs under Spanish legislation, which includes Pit Bull Terrier, Staffordshire Bull Terrier, American Staffordshire Terrier, Rottweiler, Bullmastiff, Neapolitan Mastiff, Argentina Mastiff, Bordeaux Mastiff, Canary Fighting Dog (Presa Canario), Fila Brasileiro, Doberman, Tosa Inu, Akita Inu, and their mixes as well as dogs declared dangerous by a veterinarian. The authors advocate for further research and the establishment of a national reporting system on dog bites and attacks and recommend utilizing a multidisciplinary approach to better understand and prevent such incidents in the future. Moreover, they note that other experts advocate for the necessity of conducting epidemiological studies in each country or region where prevention strategies are to be implemented. This is because the impact of risk factors may vary from one location to another. In every cultural context, devising prevention strategies for dog bites would be enhanced by assessing the types of human-canine interaction or environmental factors that commonly expose dogs to situations where they are prone to resort to biting.

Spain identifies three categories of potentially dangerous dogs, which all have restrictions placed upon ownership. Those include specific breeds, dogs with specific appearances and dogs who have behaved dangerously in the past.

=== United States of America ===
==== 2013 study: Journal of the American Veterinary Medical Association ====
The most recent study of the epidemiology of fatal dog bites in the United States was published in the Journal of the American Veterinary Medical Association (AVMA) in 2013. While earlier studies were based on television and newspaper reports, this was the first study to be based on law-enforcement reports, animal control reports, and investigator statements. It identified preventable factors in the fatal incidents. They found that the most common contributing factors were: absence of an able-bodied person to intervene, no familiar relationship of victims with dogs, owner failure to neuter dogs, compromised ability of victims to interact appropriately with dogs (e.g. mental disabilities), dogs kept isolated from regular positive human interactions versus family dogs (e.g. dogs kept chained in backyards), owners' prior mismanagement of dogs, and owners' history of abuse or neglect of dogs. Furthermore, they found that in 80% of the incidents, 4 or more of the above factors co-occurred.

The authors found that in a significant number of DBRFs there was either a conflict between different media sources reporting breed and/or a conflict between media and animal control reports relative to the reporting of breed. For 401 dogs described in various media accounts of DBRFs, media sources reported conflicting breed attributions for 124 of the dogs (30.9%); and where there were media reports and an animal control report (346 dogs), there were conflicting breed attributions for 139 dogs (40.2%)

According to this study, reliable verification of the breed of dog was only possible in 18% of incidents.

==== 2009 study: Wilderness & Environmental Medicine ====
This 27-year study published in the Wilderness & Environmental Medicine, collected data from the CDC Wide-Ranging OnLine Data for Epidemiologic Research (CDC WONDER) program. It looked at cases in which the cause of death according to International Classification of Diseases (ICD) codes was dog bites. It did not include fatalities secondary to an infection from a bite. During those 27 years, 504 deaths due to dog bites were reported (an average of 18.67 per year) to have occurred in every state except North Dakota. Six states (Texas, California, Florida, Illinois, Georgia and North Carolina) accounted for 37% of the reported cases (but they also compose 36% of the US population). The number of deaths per capita were highest in Alaska (11.83 deaths per 10 million inhabitants); the rest of the states ranged from 0 to 2.56 deaths per 10 million population. Most fatal dog bites occur in young children and the elderly. Elderly victims have a higher in-hospital fatality rate after the trauma compared to younger victims.

The study indicated that, in the US, incidents of dog-related injury and death increased along with the increases in dog and human populations. Males and children comprised the majority of fatal dog attacks, with children under age 10 representing 70% of deaths from dog bites from 1979 to 1988. Males comprised 58.1% of the reported cases whereas females comprised 41.9%, compared to the US population with 48.87% males and 51.13% females. With respect to race percentages of victims, 81.3% were white (M: 46.8%, F: 34,5%), 14.3% were black (M: 8.5%, F: 5.7%) and 4.4% were listed as "other". When compared to the US population, there was no significant difference in frequency of dog-related deaths in relation to race; the study indicated the percentages of dog ownership to be 92% white, 3% black and 3% other races; most of the available data did not report the race of the victim.

At the time of the study, some of the limitations included the lack of information regarding many important factors about the reported attacks, such as the activity that was taking place at the time, whether or not it was provoked, a positive identification of the dog's breed, size and whether it was neutered or spayed, the health of the dog and victim, location of the wounds and other relative information. There is also the possibility that a few of the reported dog bite deaths had been miscoded or possibly omitted in cases where the cause of death was secondary to the bite. A mandatory national registration system on all animal attacks with detailed information was advised in an effort to provide more insight into the factors leading up to the attack.

==== 2000 study by CDC, HSUS & AVMA ====
A joint project between researchers in the Centers for Disease Control and Prevention (CDC), Humane Society of the United States (HSUS) and American Veterinary Medical Association (AVMA), this study published in 2000 evaluated 20 years (1979-1998) of fatalities by using 18-years of data collected previously for similar studies, newly identified data from media reports for 1997-1998, and a database from HSUS. The purpose was to summarize breeds associated with reported human DBRF during a 20-year period and assess policy implications.

The authors postulated that the resulting tabulations by breed may be biased due to four factors: that their method of searching for DBRFs by using NEXIS to locate media reports was likely to only discover about 74% of the actual incidents; that dog attacks involving certain breeds may be more likely to have received media coverage in the first place; that identifications of the dog's breed is often subjective (causing possible misreporting of breed); and that the researchers weren't sure how to account for crossbreed dogs (more than one breed in a single dog).

The study defined dog attacks as "a human death caused by trauma from a dog bite". Excluded from the study were deaths by disease caused by dog bites, strangulation on a scarf or leash pulled by a dog, heart attacks or traffic accident, and falling injury or fire ant bites from being pushed down by a dog. The study also excluded four deaths by trauma from dog bites by police dogs or guard dogs employed by the government.

After excluding approximately 90 deaths from the study because no breed information was available, the researchers ended up with 238 deaths for their 20-year analysis representing 25 breeds of dog, or 227 deaths for which they had additional data for analysis. Using the 227 collection: 133 (58%) were unrestrained dogs and on the owners' property; 55 (24%) were loose off the owners' property; 38 (17%) were restrained dogs on their owners' property; and only one (less than 1%) was restrained off the owners' property.

The authors expressed disappointment that they could not adequately evaluate a "risk rate" for each dog breed (number of fatalities divided by the number of dogs), citing unavailability of population figures for each breed. Instead, they simply tabulated the fatalities by breed. Despite that limitation, the data indicated that Rottweilers and pit bull-type dogs accounted for 67% of human DBRF in the United States between 1997 and 1998, and followed with "It is extremely unlikely that they accounted for anywhere near 60% of dogs in the United States during that same period and, thus, there appears to be a breed-specific problem with fatalities."

In the 20 years from 1979 to 1998, the breeds of dogs involved were as follows:

Death-based approach (each breed counted only once per fatal incident): Pit bull-type 76; Rottweiler 44; German Shepherd 27; Husky-type 21; Malamute 15; Wolf-dog 14; Mixed-breed 12; Chow 11; Doberman 10; St. Bernard 8; Great Dane 7; Labrador 5; Akita 4; 3 each of Sled dog, Bulldog, Mastiff, Boxer, Collie; 2 each of Bullmastiff, Hound-type; 1 each of Retriever-type, Chesapeake Bay Retriever, West Highland Terrier, Terrier-type, Japanese Hunting Dog, Newfoundland, Coonhound, Sheepdog, Australian Shepherd, Rhodesian Ridgeback, Cocker Spaniel.

Dog-based approach (each dog counted, even in multi-dog fatal incidents): Pit bull-type 118; Rottweiler 67; Mixed-breed 47; German Shepherd 41; Chow 21; Husky-type 21; Malamute 16; Wolf-dog 15; Doberman 13; Great Dane 13; Sled-dog 12; Labrador 8; St. Bernard 8; Collie 6; Boxer 5; Mastiff 5; Akita 4; Bulldog 3; Australian Shepherd 3; Bullmastiff 2; Hound-type 2; and 1 each of Chesapeake Bay Retriever, Cocker Spaniel, Coonhound, Japanese Hunting Dog, Newfoundland, Retriever-type, Rhodesian Ridgeback, Sheepdog, Terrier-type, West Highland Terrier.

The authors attempted to evaluate efficacy of breed-specific legislation (BSL) as well as generic non-breed-specific dangerous dog laws, listed some of the difficulties of enforcement and touched on several of the factors, but did not have any recommendations — citing that they were unaware of any formal evaluation of effectiveness of BSL or general non-BSL dangerous dog laws in preventing fatal or nonfatal dog bites.

Some other recommendations by the authors included:

- Regulate individual dogs and owners on the basis of their behavior
- Enact stringent animal control laws and increase enforcement
- Enact dangerous dog laws that place primary responsibility for a dog’s behavior on the owner
- Target chronically irresponsible dog owners
- Encourage dog owners to seek professional help in training and socializing their pets
- Enforce leash laws
- Enforce laws against dog fighting
- Evaluate the effects of regulations that limit fences to heights insufficient for controlling large dogs
- Educate owners with respect to selection of breed, decisions to neuter/spay their dogs, and importance of socializing dogs
- Add education in schools and adult-education programs about bite prevention and canine care
- Improve surveillance and reporting for fatal and nonfatal dog bites, including collecting details of event, circumstances and the dogs' breeds and parties involved
- Collect data on the entire dog population for comparison/percentage purposes
- Maintain adequate funding for animal control agencies

==== 1997 study by Centers for Disease Control and Prevention and HSUS ====
Collecting data from HSUS, Nexis and death certificates, this 1997 write-up analysed 279 USA dog-bite related deaths from 1979-1994, briefly mentioned three specific cases from 1995-1996, and tabulated breed-specific data from 1979-1996.

Of the 199 incidents in which breed was known, the report tabulates the breeds by most fatalities first, presenting: Pit bull 60, Rottweiler 29, German shepherd 19, Husky 14, Malamute 12, Doberman 8, Chow 8, Great Dane 6, St. Bernard 4, Akita 4.

For crossbreeds, they present: Wolf hybrid 14, German shepherd 11, Pit bull 10, Husky 6, Malamute 3, Rottweiler 3, Chow 3.

The report suggested improvements in three categories for preventing dog bites: owner and public education, better enforcement by animal control, and better bite reporting for future analyses.

==== 1982 study by University of Texas and Children's Medical Center, Dallas ====
A study conducted at the University of Texas Southwestern Medical School identified 74 fatal dog bites during the period 1966–1980 from news media and medical literature.

Summary of some of the findings:

- The dogs were owned by the victim's family in 38 cases and a neighbor in 25 cases.
- The dogs were mostly described as pets or family dogs, and in 29 cases prior behavior was specifically stated as friendly or without viciousness. Only three of the dogs were considered guard dogs and two known to have prior bite histories.
- In 64 out of the 74 cases the location of attack was within or adjacent to a home or yard.
- Of the 23 victims less than one year in age, 22 occurred inside a home, and in 16 cases both child and dog lived there.
- In most cases the dog was not provoked, and in many instances the dog knew the victim.
- Dogs were either killed on scene or quarantined for rabies (all negative), and "once subdued, no further viciousness by the dogs was reported in any case."
- Only 16 breeds of dog were represented in the 74 cases: German Shepherd 16, Mixed breed 10, Husky 9, St. Bernard 8, Bullterrier (pit bull) 6, Great Dane 6, Malamute 5, Unknown breed 5, Golden Retriever 3, Boxer 2, Dachshund 2, Doberman Pinscher 2, Collie 2, Rottweiler 1, Basenji 1, Chow Chow 1, Labrador Retriever 1, Yorkshire Terrier 1.
- When comparing number of deaths by each particular breed to the number of registrations of that breed, the authors wrote: "German shepherds were involved in more deaths (16) than any other breed, but German shepherds have the highest registration (74,723) of any large breed according to the American Kennel Club. The greater number of deaths may simply reflect a larger population. In relation to its small registration (929) the bullterrier (pit bull) was responsible for the highest number of deaths (6), but the popularity of this breed may be increasing and, therefore, its population might not be reflected by its registration."

==== 1977 study by Centers for Disease Control and Prevention ====
The first epidemiological study of dog-bite fatalities in the United States was conducted by an epidemiologist with the Centers for Disease Control and Prevention (CDC) in 1977.

The study covers eleven fatality cases. Based on circumstances in each case, the author theorizes that most of the fatalities were territorial issues (in the dog's mind). He also concludes that most fatal attacks by dogs were initiated with intent to kill. He concludes this by comparing the 75% of these cases of attack by a single dog (which attacked the head and neck) to the statistic that 75% of nonfatal attack wounds are being inflicted on extremities (which are not usually fatal).

The author also rues the lack of "comprehensive surveillance" of dog bite related fatalities, and counsels that fatalities should be examined to determine the magnitude of the problem and to identify causative factors which can be eliminated to reduce fatalities.

== See also ==
- List of fatal dog attacks
- Aggression in dogs
- Dog behaviorist
- Behavioral euthanasia
- Rage syndrome
