= List of fatal dog attacks in the United Kingdom =

Fatal dog attacks in the United Kingdom are usually measured in single figures per year. A 2021 study of fatal dog attacks in Europe during the period 1995–2016 placed the United Kingdom (with 56 fatalities) as fourth in the top five countries for number of human fatalities alongside Hungary (#1), France (#2), Romania (#3), and Poland (#5). The study also found that fatal dog attacks have been increasing significantly over time which was not attributable to the increase in the number of dogs, and stated "The numbers of fatalities are indeed a very small tip of the 'dog attack iceberg', and the number of dog attacks that lead to hospitalisations of the victim outnumber fatalities by several orders of magnitude."

Some fatalities and serious attacks have been followed by calls to increase dog regulations. There was a push to limit the number and gross weight of dogs that a dog walker could legally handle at one time after dog walker Natasha Johnston lost control of her eight dogs in 2023, resulting in a witness being bitten, spooking a horse causing the equestrian to fall, and Johnston's mauling death. An increasing number of serious dog attacks (both fatal and non-fatal) was the catalyst for the Dangerous Dogs Act 1991, which led to four breeds being banned: Pitbull, Japanese Tosa, Dogo Argentino and Fila Brasileiro. Between 2021-23, around half of fatal dog attacks were caused by a single breed, the American Bully XL, and in December 2023, they were the first breed to be added to the legislation since 1991, making it illegal in England and Wales to sell, breed, abandon, or give away a Bully XL, to possess one without a Certificate of Exemption, or to have one in public without a lead and muzzle.

Below is a list of human deaths caused by dogs reported by the news media, published in scholarly papers, or mentioned through other sources. In the lists below, the dog type or breed is assigned by the sources. For more information on causes of death and studies related to dog bite-related fatalities, see Fatal dog attacks.

== Summary counts of fatalities by year ==
From the Office for National Statistics (ONS) (England and Wales 1981–2023):

1980. N/A
1981. 0
1982. 0
1983. 2
1984. 1
1985. 4
1986. 0
1987. 1
1988. 0
1989. 2
1990. 1
1991. 4
1992. 0
1993. 2
1994. 1
1995. 0
1996. 3
1997. 2
1998. 1
1999. 2
2000. 2
2001. 1
2002. 5
2003. 5
2004. 2
2005. 2
2006. 3
2007. 3
2008. 2
2009. 6
2010. 3
2011. 5
2012. 4
2013. 3
2014. 4
2015. 5
2016. 4
2017. 4
2018. 0
2019. 2
2020. 3
2021. 5
2022. 6
2023. 16
2024. 10
2025. 3

== Pre–1980 ==
Date	Victim's name	Victim's age	Victim's gender	Dog type (number)	Location	Circumstances
September 1662	A child of a former nurse to a daughter of William Batten		Unknown	Unknown (2)	Walthamstow, London, England	The child was torn to pieces by two dogs.
1737	James Brooks		Male	Unknown (1)	London, England	Brooks was bitten by a rabid dog and died.
1750	Charles Godman		Male	Unknown (1)	London, England	Godman was bitten by a rabid dog and later died.
1773	Unknown		Male	Unknown (1)	Bromley-by-Bow, London, England	A servant died from rabies caused by the bite of a rabid dog. He was sent to the salt water, but to no effect.
July 1822	Samuel Butcher		Male	Unknown (1)	Mile End, London, England	Butcher habitually made his dog attack and kill cats for the amusement of himself and others. On the last occasion, he beat the dog after it failed to do this; the dog turned on Butcher and injured him so severely that he died in hospital a few days later. The dog was killed at the scene by an onlooker, who cut its throat to end the attack.
24 October 1827	James Cordingley		Male	Mastiff × bulldog mix (1), Unknown (1)	Little Horton, West Yorkshire, England	Cordingley, a skinner, was discovered in the early morning by passers-by in the yard of his house with serious injuries to his arm and throat; he died soon after. He had been attacked by his two watchdogs, but the exact circumstances are unknown. It was speculated the dogs attacked him after he came home drunk, late the previous night. Both dogs were put down soon after.
8 April 1837	Ann Banks		Female	Mastiff × Bloodhound	Meols, Cheshire, England	Banks was killed by a watchdog owned by a relative while taking it for a walk by the seashore with the relative's two children; the children escaped unharmed. The dog was later shot.
c. January 1854	Ann Edwards		Female	Unknown (1)	Liverpool, England	Edwards, an elderly woman, was killed by a dog owned by her landlady, Elizabeth Jackson. Jackson attempted to conceal the death, but the victim was missed and her body was found in the house by police.
March 1892	Abigail McDonald		Female	Unknown (4)	Ballynahinch, County Down, Northern Ireland	McDonald received fatal injuries while trying to separate four of her dogs which were fighting. The dogs were later put down.
13 August 1896	Christopher Ellsworth	49	Male	St Bernard (1)	Egremont, Cheshire, England	Ellsworth was attacked by his dog in his backyard. It bit his leg and refused to let go, despite the victim's daughter beating the dog with a whip. He was admitted to the hospital and died on the 17th.
5 November 1911	Harry Riley Hargreaves	17	Male	Several Mastiffs	Craggs Street, Middlesbrough, England	Hargreaves, who had an outstanding warrant for larceny, trespassed on an enclosed marine supply yard at night and was attacked by the guard dogs. The owner was charged under Section 2 of the Dogs Act 1871 but it was determined in court that the dogs were kept under proper control as they were behind a 13 ft (4.0 m) wall and the charge was dismissed.
1934	Julia Tarpey	5 weeks	Female	Fox Terrier	Eccles, Greater Manchester, England	Tarpey was left in a pram in the garden. The neighbour's family pet, "a friend of the children", was later seen sitting on the pram, and the baby was found to have been bitten about the head.
1935	Luhanna Elizabeth Bradley	83	Female		Oxford Street, Southsea, England	A dog playfully jumped against Bradley, knocking her down and breaking her leg. She then contracted pneumonia and died.
1935	George William Smith	3	Male	Six Great Danes	Hanley, England	The dogs were seen mauling Smith and carrying him about in their mouths. A reason for the attack was not determined.
1935	Anne Enid Ward	11 months	Female	St Bernard	Chandler's Ford, Hampshire, England	While eating lunch at a table, Ward's father was throwing scraps to the dog that was sitting below, when it suddenly bit the infant, who was crawling nearby, puncturing her head.
4 June 1947; 17 June 1947 †	Janet Bennett	43	Female		Edinburgh, Scotland	A large black and white dog jumped up and pushed Bennett over, causing her spinal injuries. She died from her injuries two weeks later in Edinburgh Royal Infirmary.

== 1980–1999 ==
Date	Victim's name	Victim's age	Victim's gender	Dog type (Number)	Location	Circumstances
4 June 1981	Michek Cecil Franciss	1	Male	German Shepherd (7)	Harlesden, London, England	Francis was in the garden of his grandparents' home where he was attacked by dogs owned by his uncle. The subsequent inquest was told the dogs were in poor condition and had been kept in a confined space. A verdict of accidental death was recorded.
9 December 1986	Amy Victoria Bourne	5 days	Female	Jack Russell Terrier (1)	London, England	Bourne was found dead in her carrycot with skull perforations and fractures caused by dog bites.
14 April 1989	Kellie Lynch	11	Female	Rottweiler (2)	Argyll, Scotland	While on holiday, Lynch was mauled by two prize-winning Rottweilers. The victim was walking the dogs with a friend when the attack took place, as they had done several times before. The victim's friend, Lorraine Simpson, who was twelve years old, tried to save her life, but to no avail. The dogs had never shown any signs of aggression before the attack and both were put down.
18 February 1991	William Roach	38	Male	German Shepherd (1)	Rusholme, Manchester, England	Roach was savaged to death by his pet dog as his wife tried to rescue him.
November 1991	David Parry	9	Male	Great Dane (1), German Shepherd (1), Lakeland Terrier (1)	Leighton Buzzard, Bedfordshire, England	Parry was killed by his family's three pet dogs in the garden of the family's pub. The three dogs were subsequently put down at the request of the father.
21 November 1993	Dean Parker	7	Male	Pit bull mix (1)	Middlesbrough, North Yorkshire, England	The dog, being walked by two unsupervised boys, aged seven and ten, broke free of its lead and leapt at a snowman being built by Parker and his friend, Edward Davies, who was eight years old. The dog then attacked Parker, biting through his jugular vein. He died from the injuries inflicted to his neck. When attacked, Parker screamed and struggled in an attempt to frighten off the dog, but this did not succeed; an expert later testified at the inquest that, given the dog's breed, this behaviour by Parker was counterproductive, and that the dog would only have been willing to let him go once he stopped screaming and resisting. Davies attempted to pull the dog off Parker, but was unable to do so. Early reports called the dog a mastiff cross-breed, but at the inquest, it was deemed largely a pit bull. The victim's father stated that the dog "was well known on the estate as being very dangerous before it attacked Dean".
22 December 1994	Ashley Wilson	1 month	Female	Bull Terrier (1)	Preston, Lancashire, England	A dog attack just before Christmas; Wilson had been lying in a bouncing chair by her mother's feet when the dog, named Dodger, suddenly grabbed the baby by the head. Despite being taken to the Royal Preston Hospital, the victim died two hours later from brain injuries. The dog was put down at the request of the family.
23 December 1995	David Kearney	11	Male	Rottweiler (2 or 3)	Darwen, Lancashire, England	Kearney was attacked two days before Christmas after climbing a fence to fetch his football. The boy was so badly mutilated, that his mother did not recognise him. He died two weeks after hospital admission and having a leg amputated to prevent gangrene. Two dogs involved in the attack, named Sam and Jet, were put down at the owner's request; he kept the other two dogs he owned. The CPS declined to prosecute the dogs' owner, but the jury at Kearney's inquest returned a verdict of unlawful killing.
12 July 1996	Margaret Crisp	76	Female	Bull Terrier	Mead Road, Leckhampton, England	Crisp was attacked in the garden of her home by her grandson's dog, which broke her neck, and was later shot dead by police at the scene. No prosecution took place because the dog was determined not to be a banned breed.

== 2000–2009 ==
Date	Victim's name	Victim's age	Victim's gender	Dog type (Number)	Location	Circumstances
7 November 2000	Kirsty Ross	25	Female	Doberman (1)	Helston, Cornwall, England	Ross had had an epileptic seizure and her dog, named Frentzen, attempted to pick her up by the scruff of the neck as a mother dog would lift a puppy. There was no evidence of a 'savaging' of the victim, and the victim's 22-month-old daughter was in the same room unharmed. The dog was euthanised.
16 May 2003	George Dinham	45	Male	Staffordshire Bull Terrier (1)	London, England	Dinham was found dead at home, mauled to death by his dog, Ben, possibly after an epileptic seizure. Neighbours claimed the same dog attacked a child a few months before, though it was suggested that the dog might have merely jumped at the girl, and the scratches sustained were from falling over. The victim and dog were said to be inseparable, and the dog was known to nip at his owner to bring him around from seizures before. The dog was later put down.
11 July 2005	Liam Eames	1	Male	American Bulldog (1)	Leeds, West Yorkshire, England	The family's two dogs were normally kept outside, but Liam's father, Christopher (who was at work at the time of the attack), had let them in because it was hot outside. Liam's mother, Jacqueline, was sitting with him on the floor when he crawled towards the dog, and it attacked him. Jacqueline was unable to free the toddler and the dog only let go once the family's other dog intervened, at which point she ran outside with Liam shouting for help. The child was pronounced dead an hour later from head and neck wounds. The dog, named Missy, had been acquired from a rescue centre, and had a "nervous temperament," but was otherwise fine around the children. It was seized along with the family's other dog and was slated to be euthanised. The other dog was returned to the family.
24 September 2006	Cadey-Lee Deacon	5 months	Female	Rottweiler (2)	Leicester, East Midlands, England	Deacon was attacked when her mother and her partner were moving furniture in the living quarters of a pub. The two guard dogs, which were usually kept in a kennel on the pub's roof, entered through a fire escape door that was left open for 15 minutes and took the unsupervised baby from her Moses basket out onto the roof, where they mauled her. The dogs, Bruno and Bess, were owned by the partner's mother (the licensee of the pub) and were put down soon after the incident. The pub where the attack took place was located opposite a primary school. Local residents familiar with the dogs described them as "very aggressive", "powerful", and "vicious", and said people were scared to walk their children past the pub to and from school, as they feared the dogs would jump down from the roof and attack.
1 January 2007	Ellie Lawrenson	5	Female	American Pit Bull Terrier (1)	St Helens, Merseyside, England	Lawrenson's grandmother, after smoking ten cannabis joints and drinking two bottles of white wine mixed with lemonade, let the 75 lb (34 kg) dog inside the house where it attacked and killed the girl. The victim received 72 separate injuries, mostly to her head and neck, and the floor was "awash with blood" when police arrived. The dog was shot dead at the scene by a police marksman. The dog, named Reuben, had a reputation locally for aggression. It weighed 34 kg, spent its time bouncing on a trampoline in the back garden while carrying large pieces of wood, and was described by a dog specialist within the Met as "fantastically well conditioned" and of "immeasurable power". Previously, the dog had attacked the victim's aunt without provocation, leaving her needing stitches to her leg, and, on a separate occasion had attacked a Jack Russell Terrier. Kiel Simpson, the victim's uncle and owner of the dog, was jailed on possession of a banned breed and was banned from keeping dogs for five years. The victim's grandmother, Jacqueline Simpson, was charged with manslaughter, but was acquitted. Almost 200 banned dogs were surrendered the following month when Merseyside Police offered an amnesty.
28 December 2007	Archie-Lee Hirst	1	Male	Rottweiler (1)	Wakefield, West Yorkshire, England	Hirst was being carried by his aunt, who was seven years old, when the dog attacked, wrenching the toddler from her arms. He was dragged into the garden of his grandparents' house and mauled. Although Hirst's other aunt, who was 16, attempted to fight off the dog, the victim was 'savaged to death'. Both of the victim's parents were at a neighbour's house and did not witness the incident. The dog was shot dead by police at the scene. Hirst's grandparents had only acquired the dog six months prior and had not walked her for five months, according to testimony at the inquest. According to a consultant, the dog was kept in the backyard and did not have enough mental stimulation, which may have caused it to become aggressive.
27 January 2008	James Rehill	78	Male	Rottweiler (1)	Newham, London, England	Rehill was taking his dog for its morning walk when he fell over in the street. At first, the dog licked and pawed its owner. Subsequent events, and Rehill's cause of death, are disputed. Initial media reports, based on eyewitness accounts, asserted that the dog attacked, tearing chunks of flesh from his face, and that this was what caused Rehill's death. The dog only let go once sprayed with a fire extinguisher and was shot dead by police. Per other witness accounts, the dog was merely trying to help the owner, not attacking him. Furthermore, a post-mortem revealed that he had had a stroke immediately before his collapse, and his inquest ruled that his death was due to natural causes. The RSPCA complained that the ruling that he had died of natural causes did not get as widely reported as the initial "attack" had been, and cited the case as an example of a broader phenomenon that initial media reports about dog attacks are unreliable. Rehill died at the Royal London Hospital. He had owned the dog for ten years, and it had allegedly never acted aggressively before.
20 January 2009 4 February 2009 †	Stephen Hudspeth	33	Male	Staffordshire Bull Terrier (1)	Bishop Auckland, County Durham, England	Hudspeth was bitten on the elbow while walking to work and later died from septicaemia.
8 February 2009	Jaden Joseph Mack	3 months	Male	Staffordshire Bull Terrier (1), Jack Russell Terrier (1)	Ystrad Mynach, Caerphilly, Wales	The two dogs dragged three-and-a-half-month-old Mack off a table while his grandmother was taking a nap, and attacked him. The grandmother discovered the dead baby and was shrieking, drawing attention from a neighbour who came over to see what was going on. The neighbour said the baby had severe injuries to his neck and was dead. Both dogs were said to have previously acted friendly towards the infant. Both dogs were put down.
1 May 2009	Andrew Walker	21	Male	German Shepherd (2)	Blackpool, Lancashire, England	Walker was one of two men who were trying to separate two dogs that were fighting in their backyard. Both dogs turned on the victim, who received 51 bites in the attack and lost four pints of blood. The dogs were euthanised at the request of the owner, who was known to have owned dangerous dogs before. His previous Rottweilers had attacked a woman and killed her poodle, but he was not banned from owning animals.
18 June 2009 21 September 2009 †	Damian Holden	35	Male	Weimaraner (1)	Wales	While Holden was trying to put up a tent during a camping holiday with his wife and son in Wales, his dog, Eric, nipped his hand. (The coroner would later rule that the nip had no "malicious intent" behind it.) Holden developed sepsis as a result of a virus in the dog's saliva, suffered multiple organ failures, had his feet amputated, and finally died three months later in hospital in Crewe, Cheshire.
30 November 2009	Jon Paul Massey	4	Male	Pit bull type (1)	Liverpool, England	Massey was attacked at home by a large dog. His grandmother tried to protect him, sustaining injuries herself. The dog, named Uno, was shot in the front garden by responding police. It had been reported that they were breeding dogs at the house. Christian Foulkes, the victim's uncle and the dog's owner, pleaded guilty to three counts under the Dangerous Dogs Act and was sentenced to four months in prison. He was found to be breeding pit bulls. The victim's grandmother admitted one charge of keeping a dangerous dog and was given a four-month prison sentence, suspended for 18 months, and was banned from owning dogs for life.

== 2010–2019 ==
Date	Victim's name	Victim's age	Victim's gender	Dog type (Number)	Location	Circumstances
17 April 2010	Zumer Ahmed	1	Female	American Bulldog (1)	Crawley, West Sussex, England	18-month-old Ahmed was mauled by her uncle's dog, named Game, who came in from the backyard. The girl's grandmother, Naseem Ahmed, who was present, was not strong enough to remove the dog. Two workmen at the house next door pulled Ahmed and the dog apart, but the toddler died in hospital from her injuries. Urfan Ahmed, the victim's uncle and the dog's owner, was not charged with manslaughter due to insufficient evidence, but was charged with dangerous dog offences in respect of a second dog he owned, a Dogo Argentino named Shakira (a banned dog), and was banned from keeping dogs for five years. Both dogs were put down.
16 August 2010 18 August 2010 †	Lesley Banks	51	Female	Rottweiler (1)	Bridgnorth, Shropshire, England	Banks was bitten by her dog, Brannigan, while loading him into a car, and refused to seek medical treatment for the bite out of fear that Brannigan, who had previously saved her life by waking her during a fire, would be put down as a result. She developed septicaemia and died two days after the bite. The dog was put down.
23 December 2010	Barbara Williams	52	Female	Neapolitan Mastiff (1)	Wallington, Sutton, England	Williams was attacked and killed by her partner's mastiff, suffering multiple injuries and a severe haemorrhage to her head and neck. The dog, named Debo, was shot dead by police marksmen, and a pit bull puppy named Ruby (a banned dog) was seized and later euthanised. Alex Blackburn-Smith, a former Army paratrooper and the dogs' owner, was ordered to complete 150 hours of unpaid community service, pay costs of £3,340, and was banned from owning any animal or having anything to do with keeping or transporting animals. Smith's neighbour had previously called the police and local council about the dog after it smashed the fence between the two properties.
23 January 2012 29 January 2012 †	Leslie Trotman	83	Male	Pit bull type (1)	Brentford, West London, England	Trotman was attacked in his garden by his neighbour's escaped dog, suffering bite wounds and injuries from being knocked over. He died six days later from a ruptured spleen. The dog's owner was arrested on suspicion of manslaughter and three dogs were seized.
February 2012	Gary Dickinson	57	Male	Terrier	Sturry, Kent, England	Dickinson was nipped by his terrier and the wound became infected. When Dickinson's partner first took him to hospital for treatment, the on-call GP at Kent and Canterbury Hospital misdiagnosed his symptoms as food poisoning and sent him home. Dickinson later suffered septic shock due to the infection and died three days after the bite. The dog was rehomed.
30 October 2012	Gloria Knowles	71	Female	Bordeaux Bulldog (2), American Bulldog (2), Mongrel (1)	Morden, South London, England	Knowles was attacked and killed by her daughter's dogs when she went to feed them. Police seized five dogs: two Bordeaux Bulldogs, two American Bulldogs, and a mongrel.
20 November 2012	Harry Harper	8 days	Male	Jack Russell Terrier cross (1)	Telford, Shropshire, England	Harper was attacked in his carrycot by the smaller of the family's two pet dogs. The dog, named PJ, which neighbours described as "small but vicious", was put down.
26 March 2013	Jade Lomas-Anderson	14	Female	Staffordshire Bull Terrier (2), Bullmastiff (2)	Atherton, Greater Manchester, England	Lomas-Anderson was visiting a friend's house. Her friend briefly left, leaving Lomas-Anderson alone in the house, when four of her friend's five dogs attacked her. The dogs, Buddy, Neo, Ty and Sky, were shot dead by police. Their owner was given a 16-week suspended prison sentence for animal cruelty.
25 May 2013	Clifford Clarke	79	Male	Presa Canario x Bull Mastiff (1)	Liverpool, England	Clarke was attacked in his garden. He was dragged around and had one arm chewed off at the elbow. The 70 lb dog, which had not been fed for roughly 48 hours before the attack, was so aggressive, it bit at the end of the officer's gun; it was shot twice and killed. The dog's owners were charged under the Dangerous Dogs Act, were both jailed for a year, and banned from keeping dogs.
5 November 2013	Lexi Branson	4	Female	Bulldog type or Aylestone Bulldog (1)	Mountsorrel, Leicestershire, England	Branson was home from school, sick, when the dog, named Mulan, attacked her, going straight for her throat. The child's mother repeatedly stabbed the dog with a kitchen knife. A post-mortem revealed Branson died from facial injuries and the dog preventing the girl from breathing. The family got the dog from a rescue centre two months prior; it was originally a stray that had been through several owners since 2007.
9 December 2013	Emma Bennett	27	Female	Pit bull (2)	Osmondthorpe, Leeds, West Yorkshire, England	Bennett, a pregnant mother-of-four, died after she was attacked by two dogs, named Bella and Dollar, at her home in Leeds. She died the next day. Lee Horner, the victim's partner and owner of the dogs, pleaded guilty to owning dogs prohibited by the Dangerous Dogs Act and was ordered at Leeds Magistrates' Court to complete 280 hours of unpaid community service. The court heard he had threatened to set one of the dogs on two female social workers months before the fatal attack. He was banned from keeping dogs for life and ordered to pay £800 costs.
7 January 2014	Barry Walsh	46	Male	Staffordshire Bull Terrier (1)	Westcliffe-on-Sea, Essex, England	Walsh was mauled by his girlfriend's dog, Gypsy, after a domestic incident. The "highly protective" dog bit him 42 times, broke five of his ribs, and ruptured his spleen. The circumstances were unclear; Walsh's girlfriend alleged he slapped her and picked up and threatened Gypsy, but she changed elements of her story during the investigation and again during the inquest, and the police investigator complained she never gave a coherent account. The coroner recorded an open verdict, stating that "We will never, ever, know or ever be entirely clear what happened".
11 February 2014	Ava-Jayne Corless	11 months	Female	Pit bull (1)	Blackburn, Lancashire, England	Corless was attacked and killed by a 126 lb dog as her mother lay sleeping with her boyfriend, the dog's owner. The dog was determined to be a pit bull terrier by experts and a veterinary surgeon and was put down after the attack. Lee Wright was jailed for 18 weeks and prohibited from owning dogs for five years after he was found guilty of owning a prohibited breed. The dog was named Snoop, but was known in the neighbourhood by the name "Killer", as it killed a neighbour's cat two years prior.
18 February 2014	Eliza-Mae Mullane	6 days	Female	Alaskan Malamute (1)	Pontyberem, Carmarthenshire, Wales	Mullane's mother left the sleeping baby in her pram inside the house while she stepped out to put her son in a taxi for school. One of the family's two pet dogs had entered the room and the baby was on the floor. The dog involved in the attack, an Alaskan Malamute, was seized and put down; the other dog, a collie-cross, was also euthanised.
16 July 2014	Irene Collins	73	Female	German Shepherd (1)	Middlesbrough, North Yorkshire, England	Collins was repeatedly bitten when police let loose a 98 lb (44 kg) police dog to locate a suspected drug dealer on the run. She suffered multiple bites and a broken arm from falling during the attack. She had lung cancer and emphysema and died four days after the attack. The pathologist said her death was hastened by the bites. The dog, which had eleven prior biting incidents, was put down. Cleveland Police changed their policy on acquiring dogs, now requiring bite records.
20 September 2014	Andrew Russell	90	Male	American Bulldog (1)	West Calder, Scotland	Russell, a pensioner with a zimmerframe, stepped in to protect his wife after an American Bulldog pounced on her. The dog turned on him and ripped the flesh from his arm, exposing bone, before bystanders came to his aid. He initially made good progress in hospital, but later deteriorated and died a month after the attack. The inquest found no clear cause of death and did not rule out death by natural causes.
20 July 2014	Louise Caygill	43	Female	Staffordshire Bull Terrier (1)	Liverpool, England	Caygill was found in her flat, dead from multiple dog bites. The dog, which had bitten and injured her arm on a previous occasion as well as biting and hospitalising another man, was seized and put down. A neighbour overheard her shouting at her dog to get down and let go of her, but did not intervene because this was a common occurrence.
3 October 2014	Molly-Mae Wotherspoon	6 months	Female	American Pit Bull Terrier (1)	Daventry, Northamptonshire, England	Wotherspoon was attacked when the family's pit bull terrier (banned under the Dangerous Dogs Act) broke free from its cage. The infant had injuries to all four limbs and puncture wounds to her brain. The dog, named Bruiser, was put down at the scene. The victim's mother and grandmother were both sentenced to two years in prison and prohibited from owning any dog for ten years.
20 March 2015	Rhona Greve	64	Female	American Bulldog (1)	Ely, Cardiff, Wales	Greve, who had heart disease, suffered cardiac arrest and died after being bitten on the face and neck by her grandson's dog, named Solo. Craig Greve was already banned from owning dogs due to a previous incident, and was sentenced to four months in prison. A 17-year-old boy was also arrested in connection with the death and was released on police bail. The dog involved in the attack had behaved violently towards the victim in the past.
20 June 2015	Reggie Young	3 weeks	Male	Lakeland Terrier cross (1)	Sunderland, Tyne and Wear, England	While Reggie's father was asleep, three-week-old Reggie either fell or was dragged from his bouncer and was mauled by the terrier, named Tricky. He was found alive in a pool of blood by his mother when she returned home, but could not be saved. Ryan Young, Reggie's father, pleaded guilty at Newcastle Crown Court to being in charge of a dangerous dog and was sentenced to 21 months' imprisonment.
9 October 2015 16 October 2015 †	William George	68	Male	Pit bull type (1)	Dorset, England	George contracted sepsis when he was bitten on the left hand as he tried to save his Springer Spaniel from the pit bull-type dog, named Rocco. Four days after the incident, the victim visited his GP, who gave him a tetanus boost and antibiotics, but his health worsened, and he was rushed to hospital the next day. By that time, George was 'beyond help', and he suffered multiple organ failure and died a week after the incident.
12 November 2015 18 November 2015 †	Ken McCall	84	Male	English Springer Spaniel (1)	Winchester, Hampshire, England	McCall, a retired carpenter, was playing tug-of-war with his 16-month-old Springer Spaniel when she accidentally bit the back of his hand. McCall became unwell the following day and sought treatment at the out-of-hours service where he got antibiotics prescribed. Upon returning home, his symptoms worsened and he was admitted to hospital on November 15, where he died three days later.
1 January 2016	Liam Hewitson	22	Male	Pit bull cross (1)	Preston, Lancashire, England	The dog attacked while Hewitson was having an epileptic seizure, injuring his trachea. His father kicked, hit, and stabbed the dog trying to loosen its hold. Paramedics were unable to save Hewitson. The five-year-old family dog (named Trigger, and said to not be a banned breed but described as a pit bull cross) had twice before attacked the victim when he was having an epileptic episode.
22 May 2016	Stephen Hodgson	45	Male	Staffordshire x Pit bull cross (1)	Cleator Moor, Cumbria, England	Hodgson, who had consumed a large amount of alcohol and collapsed at home, was passed out on a bed when his dog, named Buster, entered the room, grabbed him by the back of the neck, dragged him to the floor, and mauled him about the neck. He had twice before been bitten by the same dog, leading to hospital treatment for a bite to his forearm. The dog severed Hodgson's carotid artery and jugular vein before being dragged off by the victim's two daughters, who were 17 and 19 years old. It was tasered by police and later died.
15 August 2016	David Ellam	52	Male	Staffordshire Bull Terrier cross (1)	Huddersfield, West Yorkshire, England	Ellam and his Yorkshire Terrier, Rolo, were attacked when his neighbour's dog, named Alex, got out of its pen. Two months prior, Ellam reported the dog to the council, fearing it was a pit bull terrier and might attack. Police seized the dog but returned it to its owner a week before the fatal attack after deciding it was not a banned breed per the Dangerous Dogs Act. Ellam suffered a sustained attack and the dog was still mauling him when police arrived at the scene. Aaron Joseph, the dog's owner, was jailed for ten years after he was convicted of owning a dog dangerously out of control causing injury resulting in death. He had failed to comply with an order to muzzle and restrain the dog, which had a history of attacking neighbours. The victim's dog received emergency veterinary treatment for injuries sustained in the attack, but survived.
18 August 2016	Dexter Neal	3	Male	American Bulldog Mastiff-Bulldog (1)	Halstead, Essex, England	Neal was pushed to the ground by the rescue dog and attacked. He died on the way to the hospital. Jade Dunne, the dog's owner, pleaded guilty to owning a dangerously out of control dog causing injury resulting in death, was sentenced to a year in prison, suspended for two years, banned from owning dogs for ten years, and ordered to carry out 100 hours of unpaid community service. The dog, named Ruby, was euthanised.
13 October 2016	Archie Joe Darby	4 months	Male	Staffordshire Bull Terrier (1)	Colchester, Essex, England	Darby's mother was with her two sons and talking to someone on the phone when the dog attacked the children. The mother knew that her younger child was already dead and tried to save her older child, Daniel-Jay, who was 22 months old. The mother was able to get the dog out into the conservatory and barricade the door. Bailey, the dog owned by her sister and brother-in-law for four years and acquired from a rescue centre, continued aggressive behaviour right up until it was put to sleep. A post-mortem examination was conducted and it concluded that there were no signs of disease or ill health. The family moved into the home a week prior to the attack. The mother was also injured during the attack and Daniel-Jay suffered life-changing injuries.
20 March 2017	Mario Perivoitos	41	Male	Staffordshire Bull Terrier (1)	North London, England	Perivoitos, who worked in IT, was attacked and killed by his dog while taking part in a BBC documentary on drugs, after having an epileptic seizure. The victim suffered injuries to his face and neck, extensive haemorrahaging, and his larynx was crushed. The film crew at Perivoitos's home, who were present but not filming, attempted to fight off the dog, but the victim died in hospital from his injuries. Cocaine and morphine were found in the dog's urine. The dog, named Major, was to be euthanised.
25 June 2017 11 July 2017 †	Derek Luckie	73	Male	Staffordshire Bull Terrier (1)	Walton-on-the-Naze, Essex, England	Luckie was nipped on the leg and wounded during his daily walk, contracted sepsis, went to hospital two days later, and died on July 11. The dog was a rescue dog that had never previously displayed signs of aggression. The dog's owner turned themselves in to police, the dog was euthanised, and the owner was given a six month suspended prison sentence.
15 October 2017	Ryan Busa	10	Male	German Shepherd (1)	Newtownabbey, County Antrim, Northern Ireland	Busa was attacked and killed by his family's pet dog.
18 November 2018 13 December 2018 †	Reuben McNulty	2 months	Male	Staffordshire Bull Terrier (2)	Yaxley, Cambridgeshire, England	McNulty was attacked at home by his parents' two dogs, suffering severe injuries. He died in hospital weeks later. Both dogs were euthanised.
13 April 2019	Frankie MacRitchie	10	Male	Bulldog cross or American Bulldog x Staffordshire Bull Terrier cross	Cornwall, England	MacRitchie was attacked and killed when he was left alone with the dog, named Winston, in a caravan at a holiday park. The child's mother and the dog's owner had both left the caravan to drink. The dog's owner was arrested on suspicion of manslaughter and having a dog dangerously out of control. The blood-soaked woman had left the area by begging for a taxi or train fare and pretending she was a victim of domestic violence. The dog was seized by police. Variously described as a "bulldog-type breed", a "boxer bulldog type", and a "large bulldog cross", it was discovered that the dog had been involved in four previous attacks and often wore a muzzle at home. The boy's mother was jailed for two years for child neglect and the dog's owner was jailed for three years for owning a dangerously out of control dog.
31 May 2019 7 June 2019 †	Sharon Jennings	55	Female	Unknown (1)	Preston, Lancashire, England	Jennings was bitten on the hand and neck when she broke up a fight between her dog and another dog during a walk on 31 May. She was taken to hospital on 3 June and died four days later from sepsis. The other dog was identified and seized, and its owner was arrested "on suspicion of offences under the Dangerous Dogs Act", but these charges were dropped by the CPS due to lack of evidence.
24 September 2019	Elayne Stanley	44	Female	American Bulldog (2)	Widnes, Cheshire, England	Stanley was pounced on and mauled by her two dogs, named DJ and Billy. The victim, who weighed eight stone, was unable to fight them off. Neighbours were alerted by screams from the victim's twin daughters. The neighbours forced their way into the victim's house and attempted to distract the dogs by throwing bricks and tools at them. Police shot and killed DJ at the scene, while Billy was taken to a secure kennel and was put down four days later. The victim was treated by paramedics at the scene, but later died. Reports say that the dogs became unnerved by an argument which could have caused them to become aggressive. The dogs had lived with the owner for just over two years, having come from the victim's ex-boyfriend. At the inquest, it was revealed the dogs had been involved in incidents that the new owner was not aware of.

== 2020–present ==
Date	Victim's name	Victim's age	Victim's gender	Dog type (Number)	Location	Circumstances
29 January 2020	Jonathan Halstead	35	Male	Staffordshire Bull Terrier x Mastiff cross (1)	Oldham, Greater Manchester, England	The coroner recorded a narrative conclusion that Halstead 'died as a result of injuries sustained in an attack from his dog, whilst unconscious following an epileptic seizure'. His cause of death was recorded as a severe neck injury as a result of dog bites and epilepsy. The dog, named Bronson, was shot dead by police so that medics could attend to the victim.
13 September 2020	Elon Jase Ellis-Joynes	12 days	Male	Chow Chow x German Shepherd cross (1)	Doncaster, South Yorkshire, England	Joynes was mauled to death by his family's pet dog at home. He suffered between 30 and 40 puncture wounds and later died in hospital, while the dog, named Teddy, was put down. A post-mortem report found the infant died as a result of severe trauma to his chest and abdomen with injuries "typical of having been repeatedly bitten by a dog". Stephen Joynes, the victim's father, admitted to a charge of being the owner of a dangerously out-of-control dog, causing injury resulting in death. He was sentenced to four years in prison at Sheffield Crown Court.
5 February 2021	Keira Ladlow	21	Female	Staffordshire Bull Terrier cross (1)	Birmingham, West Midlands, England	Ladlow died after being attacked by a dog her brother bought to improve her mental health. A post-mortem examination revealed "extensive injuries" the court heard, which likely caused her death. The dog, named Gucci, was put down.
2 April 2021	Lucille Downer	85	Female	American Bulldog (2)	Rowley Regis, West Midlands, England	Downer, a retired cook, was attacked in her back garden after the dogs escaped from a neighbour's garden through a hole in a fence. Darren Pritchard pleaded guilty to an offence under the Dangerous Dogs Act at Wolverhampton Crown Court in April 2023.
8 November 2021	Jack Lis	10	Male	American Bully XL (1)	Caerphilly, Gwent, Wales	Lis died after being bitten on the face and neck by a "large and powerful" dog while visiting a school friend's house. The dog, named Beast, was put down by firearms officers. The dog's owner, Brandon Hayden, was sentenced in June 2022 to just over four years at a young offenders' institution, and Amy Salter was jailed for three years after they pleaded guilty to being in charge of the out-of-control dog.
22 December 2021	Adam Watts	55	Male	American Bully XL (1)	Auchterhouse, Scotland	Watts was attacked at the Juniper Kennels and Cattery he owned and was pronounced dead at the scene. The dog involved had been put into the care of Mr Watts' kennels by police after being seized under warrant in August. The dog's previous owner, Peter Fyfe, was banned from keeping animals for five years over previous incidents involving the dog attacking other dogs.
10 January 2022	John William Jones	68	Male	English Bulldog (3)	Lampeter, Ceredigion, Wales	Jones, who had Down syndrome, was bitten by three dogs at a house and later died at the scene from his injuries, as recorded by the Ceredigion Coroner's Office. A woman was subsequently arrested in connection with the attack.
6 March 2022	Kyra Leanne King	3 months	Female	Husky (1)	Woodhall Spa, Lincolnshire, England	King was killed after an attack at Ostler's Plantation, an area popular with dog walkers. The dog, named Blizzard, was one of 19 huskies being exercised by her parents. The victim's mother, Karen Alcock, pleaded guilty to being in charge of a dog that was out of control causing injury and resulting in death, while her father, Vince King, initially pleaded not guilty but changed his plea to guilty on the day of the trial. Both received suspended prison sentences and unpaid work, and the dog was put down.
21 March 2022	Bella-Rae Birch	1	Female	American Bully XL (1)	St Helens, Merseyside, England	17-month-old Birch was attacked at home by a dog that her family had owned for only a week. Merseyside Police announced tests have confirmed that the dog involved was an American Bully XL.
28 March 2022	Lawson Bond	2	Male	Rottweiler (1 to 3)	Egdon, Worcestershire, England	Bond suffered serious injuries and was in cardiac arrest following an attack at his grandmother's home. The grandmother, Maria Bond, was an unlicensed Rottweiler breeder who left the toddler briefly unsupervised, during which time, he let himself into a field housing three dogs and was attacked. The three rottweilers that were removed from the property following the attack were housed securely by West Mercia Police for several weeks before being put down.
15 May 2022	Daniel John Twigg	3	Male	Cane Corso (1)	Milnrow, Rochdale, England	Police were called by paramedics after Twigg was injured in the attack. He was rushed to hospital but died from his injuries. His parents were later charged with gross negligence manslaughter.
23 May 2022	Keven Jones	62	Male	American Bully XL (1)	Wrexham, Wales	Jones died after being bitten by his daughter-in-law's dog, Cookie, and went into cardiac arrest. He was pronounced dead at the scene, despite efforts to rescue him. Chanel Fong pleaded not guilty to owning a dog dangerously out of control.
15 June 2022	Joanne Robinson	43	Female	American Bully XL or Cane Corso (1)	Rotherham, South Yorkshire, England	Robinson was mauled by her dog, named Rocco, at home, and died of severe blood loss from neck wounds. The dog had been bought by the victim and her boyfriend as a companion for their other dog, Lola, who was of a similar breed. Jamie Stead, Robinson's partner, suffered devastating injuries to his face, hands and chest as he tried to pull the dog off her.
10 August 2022	Ian "Wiggy" Symes	34	Male	American Bully XL (1)	Fareham, Hampshire, England	The 52 kg dog had been purchased the day before from a travellers' site by Symes's friend, after seeing a video on Snapchat. Immediately prior to the attack, the victim took the dog, named Kong, out for a walk, and was observed engaging in rough play with the dog, winding it up and putting it into a headlock, which caused the dog to become aggressive.
3 October 2022	Ann Dunn	65	Female	American Bulldog (1 to 5)	Vauxhall, Liverpool, England	Dunn died after being attacked by multiple dogs. Emergency services pronounced her dead at the scene. Five dogs who lived at the property were surrendered to the authorities and put down.
17 November 2022	Joseph James	89	Male	Patterdale Terrier (1)	Workington, Cumbria, England	James died after developing a blood infection linked to being bitten on the little finger by his neighbour's Patterdale terrier, named Annie. He lost the tip of the finger on his left hand when he was pulled to the ground by the animal outside his home.
3 December 2022 20 December 2022 †	Shirley Patrick	83	Female	American Bully XL x Cane Corso cross (1)	Caerphilly, South Wales	Patrick, a retired nurse, died from her injuries 17 days after being attacked by a dog. She had dementia, and her cause of death was given as sepsis, pneumonia, infected scalp wounds, and traumatic lacerations secondary to a dog attack. The dog, named Bagheera, was seized by police and put down.
12 January 2023	Natasha Johnston	28	Female	American Bully XL (1 to 8)	Caterham, Surrey, England	Officers were called to reports of a dog/s attacking members of the public at Gravelly Hill. Johnston, a dog walker, died at the scene, and a second woman was taken to hospital with non-life-threatening injuries. Eight dogs were seized by the police.
31 January 2023	Alice Stones	4	Female	Unknown (1)	Milton Keynes, Buckinghamshire, England	Stones was attacked in the back garden of her house by a dog her family had acquired a few weeks earlier. The "large, brown" dog was put down at the scene. It was confirmed not to be a banned breed.
22 April 2023	Wayne Stevens	51	Male	Cane Corso cross (1)	Derby, England	Stevens died at the scene of the incident. The victim's brother subsequently pleaded guilty to being in charge of a dog dangerously out of control causing injury resulting in death. It was reported at sentencing that the 14-month-old dog had a history of aggressive behaviour, targeting the head and neck. Gary Stevens was jailed for four-and-a-half years and banned from keeping dogs for life.
19 May 2023	Jonathan Hogg	37	Male	American Bully XL (1)	Leigh, Greater Manchester, England	Hogg was found with serious injuries and was transferred to hospital, but died shortly afterwards. A 24-year-old man was bailed, after being arrested on suspicion of being in charge of a dangerously out of control dog.
2 June 2023	Unknown	75	Female	Unknown (1)	Bedworth, Warwickshire, England	A grandmother died after being attacked by her family's pet dog. Anita Atwal was charged with being in charge of a dog dangerously out of control causing injury resulting in death, and the dog - reported not to be a banned breed - was put down.
3 September 2023	Marie Stevens	40	Female	Rottweiler (2)	Brighton-le-Sands, Merseyside, England	Stevens, a care worker, was bitten on the legs and arms by two dogs. She was treated for the wounds in hospital and later discharged. Two weeks later, she collapsed and died of a pulmonary embolism. Brian and Rachel Walshe were charged with being in charge of a dog dangerously out of control causing injury resulting in death. The dogs involved in the incident were seized by police and remain in secure kennels. The dogs' owners received their sentences at Liverpool Crown Court in May 2024.
14 September 2023	Ian Price	52	Male	American Bully XL (2)	Stoke-on-Trent, Staffordshire, England	Two dogs jumped from the window of their home into the garden of a neighbour. The neighbour's son sustained multiple life-threatening injuries and later died in hospital. A 30-year-old man was initially arrested on suspicion of being in charge of dogs dangerously out of control causing injury. He was re-arrested on suspicion of manslaughter and released on conditional bail. One of the dogs involved in the attack died after being restrained by members of the public, while the other was put down by a vet. Police confirmed they were believed to be XL Bully dogs but more tests were needed to determine the breed.
4 October 2023	Ian Langley	54	Male	American Bully XL (1)	Houghton-le-Spring, Tyne and Wear, England	Langley was walking his Patterdale Terrier puppy when he was attacked by an XL Bully. He suffered injuries to his throat and later died in hospital. A man was arrested on suspicion of murder. The dog was put down at the scene and a second dog was also seized. Neighbour Christopher Bell later pleaded guilty to being the owner of a dog which caused injury leading to death while dangerously out of control in a public place.
25 November 2023	Antony 'Tony' Harrington	77	Male	Multiple, including his friend's Bernese Mountain Dog	Meriden, Warwickshire, England	Harrington, a retired vet, was found dead in his garden. It was initially unclear if the dogs' bites were the cause of death or happened after he died of natural causes, but they were later determined to be the cause of death. The dogs were seized at the scene, and a 75-year-old woman was arrested in April 2024 and bailed until June. His own Black Russian Terrier is not believed to have been involved in the attack.
3 February 2024	Esther Martin	68	Female	American Bully XL (2)	Jaywick, Essex, England	Martin tried to stop puppies from fighting and was attacked by two adult dogs named Bear and Beauty. Her grandson, who was eleven years old, was present during the attack and called for help. Her injuries were described as non-survivable, and the dogs were shot by first responders. Ashley Warren, an amateur rapper and the father of her grandson, was arrested on suspicion of dangerous dog offences. Six puppies were confiscated and taken to a police kennel for legal clarification. Concerns had previously been raised about the breed and temperament of the dogs. Warren was subsequently convicted, and sentenced to ten years imprisonment.
20 May 2024	Angeline Mahal	50s	Female	American Bully XL (2)	Hornchurch, London, England	Mahal was attacked by her son's two XL Bullies and died at the scene. The dogs were seized. The victim's son has since been charged with two counts of allowing a dog to suffer and one count of owning a fighting dog.
16 June 2024	Elle Doherty	7 months	Female	Belgian Shepherd of the variety Malinois (1)	Coventry, West Midlands, England	Doherty suffered serious head injuries and died after being bitten by her family's pet dog at home. The dog was put down.
22 July 2024	Kelly Reilly	33	Female	American Bulldog (1)	Coventry, West Midlands, England	Reilly was attacked by a pet dog in a property on Wexford Road, where paramedics found her in critical condition. They evacuated her to safety with police help and attempted to save her life, but she died at the scene shortly afterwards. Kelly was epileptic and her family believe the dog being spooked by a seizure led to the attack.
29 July 2024 30 July 2024 †	Michelle Hempstead	34	Female	Bullmastiff (1)	Southend-on-Sea, Essex, England	Hempstead suffered serious injuries from being bitten by one of her dogs, was taken by ambulance to the Royal London Hospital, and died the following day. Both of the woman's dogs - a Pomeranian and a Bullmastiff - were seized by police; it was reported that both were to be put down.
20 August 2024	David Daintree	53	Male	American Bully XL (1)	Accrington, Lancashire, England	Daintree was killed by his own XL Bully at home. Police were called to the scene by the ambulance service but Daintree was dead when they arrived. As the dog remained a threat, police shot it dead at the scene.
21 August 2024	Nicholas Glass	32	Male	American Bully XL (2), Undisclosed (2)	Rubery, Birmingham, England	Glass was found dead with injuries consistent of a dog attack. Two dogs were seized by police at the scene and two escaped dogs were captured two days later. The post-mortem revealed the victim died from injuries caused by the dog attack. Which dog(s) caused his injuries has not yet been made public.
1 November 2024	Savannah Bentham	10	Female	American Bully XL (1)	East Heslerton, near Malton, North Yorkshire, England	Bentham was attacked by her family's dog and sustained serious injuries from which she died at the scene. The dog lived with the family for four years and had an exemption certificate; it was seized by police.
4 Dec 2024	Akif Mustaq	42	Male	American Pit Bull Terrier (1)	Stratford, East London, England	Leanne McDonnell was charged with owning a dog dangerously out of control causing injury resulting in death; failing in the duty, as a person responsible for an animal, to ensure its welfare; and having custody of a fighting dog. She was also charged with three counts of owning a dog dangerously out of control causing no injury in relation to a separate incident on 18 November. The dog that was involved in both incidents was seized by police.
7 Dec 2024	Michelle McLeod	41	Female	American Bully XL (1)	Aberdeen, Scotland	McLeod died after being attacked by a dog at a flat in Aberdeen. She was pronounced dead at the scene, and the dog has since been euthanised.
24 February 2025 † 30 March 2025	John McColl	84	Male	American Bully XL (1)	Warrington, Cheshire, England	McColl was walking home when he was chased into a front garden in Bardsley Avenue in the Dallam area of Warrington, Cheshire, by the dog on 24 February. The animal had escaped from a nearby address, and was shot 19 times and killed by armed officers after the attack. Sean Garner was charged with owning a dangerously out of control dog, causing serious injury and possession of a fighting dog.
26 February 2025	Morgan Dorsett	19	Female	American Bully XL (1)	Hartcliffe, Bristol, England	Dorsett died after being attacked at a flat she was visiting. Two people, a man and a woman both aged in their 20s, were arrested on suspicion of being in charge of a dog dangerously out of control causing injury resulting in death and possession of a prohibited breed of dog. They remain in police custody. The dog was sedated, seized and later euthanised.
2 November 2025	Jonte William Bluck	9 months	Male	American Bully XL (1)	Rogiet, Monmouthshire, Wales	Bluck was staying at his father's house when he was killed by the family's six-year-old XL Bully, who had a certificate of exemption. The dog was seized and destroyed.. The cause of death was listed as 'compressive head injury consistent with a dog bite'. Two people were arrested in connection with the death.
9 April 2026	Maggie May Ann Moody	3 months	Female	Pocket American Bully (2)	Redcar, North Yorkshire, England	Moody was attacked by two dogs at a residential address in Redcar, and died as the result of a head injury. The dogs, which were in the back garden, entered the room where the baby was located, and attacked. One of the dogs was shot dead by police at the scene, while the other dog was seized and later destroyed.. Neighbours reported the two dogs to be Pocket Bullies. A 31-year-old woman was injured in the attack, and was arrested on suspicion of child neglect and being in charge of a dog dangerously out of control causing injury resulting in death. A 36-year-old man and a 45-year-old man were also arrested in connection with the death.
10 April 2026	Jamie-Lea Biscoe	19	Female	Lurcher (1)	Leaden Roding, Essex, England	Biscoe was attacked by her family's pet dog at a house in Leaden Roding, a village near Dunmow, and died at the scene. A 37-year-old man was arrested and the dog was seized.
15 April 2026	Lila "Carol" Hall	78	Female	Unknown (2)	Wolverhampton, West Midlands, England	Hall was attacked by two dogs and died at the scene. Emergency services were called to Willis Pearson Avenue in Bilston at 23:30 BST, and the dogs - reported not to be a banned breed - were destroyed.. The dogs did not belong to the victim, and a 37-year-old man was arrested and bailed.
15 August 2026	Unknown	55	Male	German Shepherd (1)	Wakefield, West Yorkshire, England	A man was bitten following an altercation on a disused railway line at around 13:30 BST. He was taken to hospital in a critical condition but died that evening.

== See also ==
- List of fatal dog attacks
- Animal attacks
- Status dog
