= Manchester and Cheshire Dogs' Home =

Manchester and Cheshire Dogs’ Home is a registered animal charity which operates two dog shelters in North West England. The charity takes in and cares for stray and unwanted dogs, making the animals available for adoption once they are fit and healthy. The charity also promotes responsible dog ownership by the public. Manchester Dogs’ Home has cared for and rehomed more than one million dogs since it opened.

== History ==
The charity was initially founded as Manchester & District Home for Lost Dogs in 1893 by a group of Manchester businessmen who were concerned about the amount of stray dogs which roamed the city. The overcrowded environment of the city at the height of the Industrial Revolution led to the suffering of dogs, and inspired councillors A.H Megson and Herbert Phillips to open a home for lost dogs in Stretford. The shelter moved to its current home in Harpurhey in 1897 when the lease on the Stretford site expired.

The Dogs Act 1906 saw regulations of the Watch Committee of the Manchester Corporation come into force, requiring every dog on the public highway or in a public place to wear a collar listing its owner’s name and address. The animals without were to be sent to the dogs’ home.

The shelter initially housed accommodation for over 150 dogs and at peak times more than 100 animals could be brought in each week. Stray dogs were only kept for one week, and if no one claimed them, they would be painlessly destroyed. Those of a better breed would be kept for longer in the hope they would be rehomed.

=== Cheshire Dogs’ Home ===
In 1999 the charity purchased a former rundown boarding kennels in and regenerated the site. The kennels became the flagship of the two shelters and a Centre of Excellence. The 11.5 acres site homes a specialist care unit which provides intense care for pregnant bitches, nursing mothers and dogs which do not adjust well to the traditional kennel set-up found at Manchester Dogs’ Home.

== Manchester Dogs’ Home fire ==
On 11 September 2014, an arson attack saw a blaze rip through the Harpurhey shelter. Firefighters were called to the scene at around 7pm when a fire broke out in the kennel section. Around 150 dogs were rescued from the fire by firefighters and civilians who rushed to help. The fire killed 60 dogs. The surviving animals were transferred to the sister shelter in Grappenhall, Cheshire. Two teenage boys were arrested following the fire, but were later released without charge.

People from across the UK and beyond showed their support following the attack by donating money, and over £1million was raised after just one day. Many animal-lovers donated by taking part in a social media campaign entitled Dog Selfie, which was created after the tragedy and saw people taking photographs with their dogs and posting them on social channels. X Factor judge and dog-lover Simon Cowell donated £25,000 to the shelter after hearing the news.

A temporary adoption shelter was opened within weeks of the fire until the home was fully operational to the public from February 2016 following a period of refurbishment and improvements.
