= Dempsey (dog) =

British dog, challenged British Dangerous Dogs Act 1991

- Dempsey with her owner
- Species: Canis familiaris
- Breed: American Pit Bull Terrier
- Sex: Female
- Born: c. 1986
- Died: 2003 (aged 16–17)
- Owner: Dianne Fanneran

Dempsey (c. 1986 – 2003) was a female American Pit Bull Terrier who was the subject of a high-profile challenge to the British Dangerous Dogs Act 1991. She was owned by Dianne Fanneran and lived in London.

While being walked one evening in April 1992, muzzled and kept on a lead in accordance with the law, she began acting sick and her muzzle was removed, allegedly to allow her to vomit.

Two passing police officers noted the unmuzzled dog and charged the caretaker under the Dangerous Dogs Act. Three months later, at Ealing Magistrates' Court, Dempsey was ordered to be euthanised for failing to be muzzled in a public place.

Appeals took three years before the Crown Court, the High Court and the House of Lords, during which time the media covered the story, not least Auberon Waugh in his Way of the World column in The Daily Telegraph.

The case was dismissed in November 1995 on a legal technicality, as it emerged that Dempsey's owner, not involved in the original incident, was unaware that the court hearing was taking place. This legal loophole meant the case was thrown out.

Dempsey was reprieved and died at the age of 17 in 2003.

== See also ==
- List of individual dogs
