= David Sands (psychologist) =

English animal psychologist and author

David Sands is an animal psychologist, author and television presenter based in Chorley, Lancashire.

Sands is primarily a human-companion animal practitioner at the Animal Behavioural Clinic in Chorley, Lancashire, specialising in the treatment of behavioural problems displayed by dogs, cats, birds, horses and exotic animals. Sands produces behaviour-modification programs and has appeared several times as an expert witness in court cases all over the country related to the Dangerous Dogs Act, and associated aggression and emotional behaviours.

He is also an internationally established animal-related author and photographer, researching ‘human psychology’ and zoology.

== Television ==
David regularly contributes and advises various UK and radio news programmes on related human and pet companionship subjects.

Year	Title	Role	Notes
	Fish People	Consultant	
	Absolutely Animals	Consultant	
	Pet Rescue	Consultant	
	Potty About Pets	Consultant	
	999	Consultant	
	The Pet Set	Consultant	Based on David's own Animal Behavioural Clinic
	To the Ends of the Earth (Amazon)	Consultant	
2005	Britain's Worst Pet	Consultant & Co-Presenter	
2006	Scottish Suicide Bridge Dogs	Presenter	Shown on William Shatner's 'World of Weird'
