= Dogs Act 1871 =

Act of the Parliament of the United Kingdom

Dogs Act 1871 (Note: Section 7.)
- Act of Parliament
- Parliament of the United Kingdom
- Long title: An Act to provide further Protection against Dogs.
- Citation: 34 & 35 Vict. c. 56
- Territorial extent: United Kingdom

Dates
- Royal assent: 24 July 1871
- Commencement: 24 July 1871 (Note: The Acts of Parliament (Commencement) Act 1793.)
- Repealed: Scotland: 26 February 2011; Northern Ireland (Note: The Dogs (1983 Order) (Commencement No. 2) Order (Northern Ireland) 1983.)
Other legislation
Amended by	Statute Law Revision (No. 2) Act 1893; Dogs Act 1906; Dogs Amendment Act 1938; Local Government (Scotland) Act 1947; Rabies Act 1974; Dangerous Dogs Act 1989; Dangerous Dogs Act 1991
Repealed by	Scotland: Control of Dogs (Scotland) Act 2010; Northern Ireland: Dogs (Northern Ireland) Order 1983

Status: Partially repealed

Records of Parliamentary debate relating to the statute from Hansard, at TheyWorkForYou

Text of statute as originally enacted

Revised text of statute as amended

Text of the Dogs Act 1871 as in force today (including any amendments) within the United Kingdom, from legislation.gov.uk.

The Dogs Act 1871 (34 & 35 Vict. c. 56) is an act of the Parliament of the United Kingdom which deals with the handling of stray and dangerous dogs.

Section 2 is the only part still in force: it says that if a magistrates' court receives a complaint that a dog is dangerous, the court can order the dog to be destroyed, or it can order the owner to keep the dog under proper control, and if that order isn't followed, the court can impose a fine.

== Subsequent developments ==
Section 1 of the act was repealed by section 10 of, and the schedule to, the Dogs Act 1906 (6 Edw. 7. c. 32), which came into force on 1 January 1907.

Section 3 of the act was repealed by section 9(2) of, and the schedule to, the Rabies Act 1974, which came into force on 23 May 1974.

The whole act was repealed for Scotland by section 16 of, and schedule 2 to, the Control of Dogs (Scotland) Act 2010 (asp 9), which came into force on 26 February 2011.

== See also ==
- Dogs Act

== Bibliography ==
- "The Dogs Act, 1871". Halsbury's Statutes of England. (The Complete Statutes of England). First Edition. Butterworth & Co (Publishers) Ltd. 1929. [ Volume 1]. Page 346 et seq. See also the "Preliminary Note" to "Animals" at page 341 and passim. Google Books: . Second Edition. Volume 1. Page 863.
- Lely, John Mounteney. The Statutes of Practical Utility. (Chitty's Statutes). Fifth Edition. Sweet and Maxwell. Stevens and Sons. Chancery Lane, London. 1894. Volume 3. Title "Dogs". Pages 6 to 9.
- Lely, John Mounteney. Chitty's Collection of Statutes of Practical Utility. Fourth Edition. Henry Sweet. Stevens and Sons. Chancery Lane, London. 1880. Volume 2. Pages 664 to 666.
- Paterson, William (ed). "Dogs Act". The Practical Statutes of the Session 1871. Horace Cox. Wellington Street, Strand, London. 1871. Pages 142 to 148.
- "The Law and the Lawyers" (1885 to 1886) The Law Times 21, 128, 203
- "The Dog Regulations and the Dog Owners" (1886) 21 The Law Journal 527 (18 September). See also pages 39, 525, 531 and 586.
