= Dangerous Dogs Act 1991 =

Act of the Parliament of the United Kingdom

Dangerous Dogs Act 1991 (Note: Section 10(1).)
- Act of Parliament
- Parliament of the United Kingdom
- Long title: An Act to prohibit persons from having in their possession or custody dogs belonging to types bred for fighting; to impose restrictions in respect of such dogs pending the coming into force of the prohibition; to enable restrictions to be imposed in relation to other types of dog which present a serious danger to the public; to make further provision for securing that dogs are kept under proper control; and for connected purposes.
- Citation: 1991 c. 65
- Introduced by: Kenneth Baker, Home Secretary (Commons); The Earl Ferrers, Minister of State for Home Affairs (Lords)
- Territorial extent: England and Wales; Scotland; Northern Ireland (section 8 only); (Note: Section 10(5).)

Dates
- Royal assent: 25 July 1991
- Commencement: 30 November 1991 (section 8); 12 August 1991 (rest of act); (Note: Section 10(4). The Dangerous Dogs Act 1991 (Commencement and Appointed Day) Order 1991 (SI 1991/1742).)
Other legislation
Amended by	Dogs Act 1871; Dangerous Dogs (Amendment) Act 1997

Status: Amended

Text of statute as originally enacted

Revised text of statute as amended

Text of the Dangerous Dogs Act 1991 as in force today (including any amendments) within the United Kingdom, from legislation.gov.uk.

Dangerous Dogs (Amendment) Act 1997 (Note: Section 6(1).)
- Act of Parliament
- Parliament of the United Kingdom
- Long title: An Act to amend the Dangerous Dogs Act 1991; and for connected purposes.
- Citation: 1997 c. 53
- Territorial extent: England and Wales; Scotland; (Note: Section 6(2).)

Dates
- Royal assent: 21 March 1997
- Commencement: 8 June 1997 (Note: Section 6(3). The Dangerous Dogs (Amendment) Act 1997 (Commencement) Order 1997 (SI 1997/1151).)
Other legislation
Amends	Dangerous Dogs Act 1991

Status: Current legislation

Text of statute as originally enacted

Revised text of statute as amended

Text of the Dangerous Dogs (Amendment) Act 1997 as in force today (including any amendments) within the United Kingdom, from legislation.gov.uk.

The Dangerous Dogs Act 1991 (c. 65) is an act of the Parliament of the United Kingdom prohibiting or restricting certain types of dogs and codifying the criminal offence of allowing a dog of any breed to be dangerously out of control. After a series of eleven dog attacks in 1991, Home Secretary Kenneth Baker promised "to rid the country of the menace of these fighting dogs". The Act has been controversial for failing to stem the rise of dog attacks and for focusing on a dog's breed or looks instead of an individual dog's behaviour.

== Introduction ==
The 1991 act was introduced by then Home Secretary Kenneth Baker, and was amended in 1997. The Act applies in England, Wales and Scotland, with The Dangerous Dogs (Northern Ireland) Order 1991 having a similar effect in Northern Ireland. The intention of the Act was the protection of the people. Prior to the Act there were no criminal penalties for injuries or deaths caused by dog attacks.

In summary:

- Section 1, Dogs bred for fighting, prohibits the ownership of certain types of dogs, unless exempted on the Index of Exempt Dogs. It was intended to have a preventive effect.
- Section 2, Other specially dangerous dogs, allows to designate further dog types that present a serious danger to the public (in addition to those bred for fighting).
- Section 3, Keeping dogs under proper control, creates a criminal offence of allowing any dog (of any breed or type) to be dangerously out of control, and legal action may be taken against the dog's owner.
- Section 4, Destruction and disqualification orders, covers orders for destruction of dogs, and orders for prohibiting offenders from the keeping of dogs for a period of time.

Britain has a long history of various dog legislation in attempts to protect the public. In the ninth century, dog-owners were fined if their dog bit a person. In 1839, fines were exacted for allowing dogs to run loose in London, and owners were liable if their unmuzzled dog attacked a person or other animal. In 1847, it became a criminal offence to let a dangerous dog run loose. The power to confiscate dogs was introduced in 1871. Prohibition of owning a dog as a penalty was available in 1989. The 1991 Act banned four types of dog, and made it an offence for an owner to allow any dog "to be dangerously out of control". In 1997, the Act was amended, relaxing rules and giving courts more flexibility about euthanasia orders. And in 2006, local authorities were empowered to ban dogs from certain public areas to reduce menace and fouling by dogs.

== Section 1 (Breed Specific Legislation) ==
Under the Act, it is illegal to own certain dogs without an exemption from a court. The Act bans the breeding, sale and exchange of these dogs, even if they are on the Index of Exempted Dogs.

The Act applies to five types of dogs:

- Pit Bull Terrier
- Japanese Tosa
- Dogo Argentino
- Fila Brasileiro
- XL Bully

The first two are explicitly mentioned in the Act, and the third and fourth were designated by the Secretary of State in 1991, and the fifth added in 2023.

The Act also covers cross-breeds of the above five types of dog. Dangerous dogs are classified by "type", not by breed label. This means that whether a dog is prohibited under the Act will depend on a judgement about its physical characteristics, and whether they match the description of a prohibited "type". This assessment of the physical characteristics is made by a Dog Legislation Officer (DLO), a police officer experienced in dog handling and dog legislation, who assists in the investigation of dog-related allegations of crime.

On 15 September 2023, Prime Minister Rishi Sunak announced that the XL Bully would be added to the Dangerous Dogs Act. It was designated on 31 December 2023 for England and Wales, and in Scotland on 23 February 2024.

=== What is prohibited ===
The act makes it illegal for anyone to own, breed, breed from, sell, advertise (even as a gift), give away, or allow a dog of any of the listed breeds to stray. Those who previously owned individuals of the breed before the act came into force could apply for Certificates of Exemption for a limited period of time after the act came into effect for each of the breeds prohibited.

=== Index of Exempted Dogs ===
The process for getting a Section 1 dog exempted includes proving to the court that the dog is not a danger to public safety, that it is owned by a 'fit and proper' person to be in charge of a dog, that the dog is already neutered and microchipped (Note: All dogs in the UK were mandated to be microchipped and registered in one of the authorised commercial databases by 2016.) and that the owner has obtained third-party insurance that would cover an incident of bodily injury or death of a person caused by the dog. Ongoing conditions include keeping the dog at the address listed, notifying of address changes, notifying of the death or export of the dog, keeping the dog muzzled and on a lead in public places, keeping the dog securely to prevent escape, and maintaining all previous conditions for the life of the dog.

The Act established the Index of Exempted Dogs and the Animal Welfare section of the Department for Environment, Food and Rural Affairs (Defra) oversees the administration of the Act and the Index.

Initially, dogs born before 30 November 1991 were eligible to be put on the Index of Exempted Dogs (a grandfather clause). Applications were received for over 8,000 dogs; 5,223 dogs received their Certificate of Exemption. Dogs born after 30 November 1991 were not eligible to be on the Index, and it was expected the Index would cease after the death of the last of the original 5,223 dogs. However, the 1997 amendments expanded eligibility, effectively continuing the Index. As of 2015, there were 3,001 Pit bull terriers on the Index, 6 Dogo Argentinos, 0 Fila Brasilieros, and 3 Japanese Tosas. As of 2018, there were 3,514 Pit bull terriers, 3 Japanese Tosas, 13 Dogo Argentinos, and 0 Fila Brazilieros. As of February 2024, when the XL Bully ban came into effect, there were over 55,000 XL bullies registered.

=== Addition of XL Bully dogs to Section 1 ===
XL Bully dogs were responsible for more than 50% (10 of the 19) dog-related human deaths caused by dogs in the UK in the period between 2021 and 2023. In 2022, the American Bully dog was the second most common breed that was seized (73 dogs seized) by the Metropolitan Police (covering Greater London) for being out-of-control; there had been no seizures prior to 2020. By 2023, the American Bully was the most commonly seized breed, with 44 seizures in the first five months (the Staffordshire Bull Terrier was the next most common with 16 seizures). In January 2023, a BBC Panorama investigation found that organised crime in the UK was moving into the market of extreme dog breeding, specifically American Bullies, as very profitable and a means of money laundering.

By June 2023, the issue had been raised in the House of Commons and by September 2023, following an attack on an 11-year-old girl by an XL Bully, Home Secretary Suella Braverman requested urgent advice on the feasibility of banning the breed. Shortly following further attacks, the Prime Minister Rishi Sunak confirmed that the XL Bully would be banned by the end of the year. Following this announcement, a protest took place within London against the ban.It was reported that there were concerns within Defra, the government department responsible for administering the Dangerous Dogs Act, over the practicality of a ban.

The subsequent ban was introduced in stages, with the selling, giving away, abandoning or breeding from an XL Bully being banned from December 31, 2023, along with a requirement that the dogs be muzzled and on a lead at all times. From February 2024, an exemption certificate, along with insurance and microchipping of the animal, had to be obtained. By the end of 2024, any XL Bullys still owned must have been neutered.

By December 2024, there were 59,500 XL Bully dogs registered for exemptions with the government (57,000 in England and Wales and 2,500 in Scotland), around 4,500 suspected banned dogs seized, and 800 dogs destroyed. Areas of Liverpool, Birmingham, Cheshire, Doncaster, and Sheffield had the highest rates of XL Bully dog exemption registration per capita.

== Reception and responses ==
The act has been described as a piece of rushed legislation which was an overreaction to a transient public mood. The Act is sometimes cited as an unfavourable example of such legislation, and in January 2007, the act was included in public responses to a BBC Radio 4 poll of unpopular UK legislation.

The Royal Society for the Prevention of Cruelty to Animals and the British Veterinary Association are both against the breed-specific legislation provisions of the Act (Section 1), claiming that there is no scientific evidence that all individuals of a breed are dangerous. The RSPCA have been criticised for their opposition to breed-specific legislation, and their own pet insurance excludes certain breeds from coverage.The Kennel Club has argued that the problem rests with irresponsible dog owners, and that an outright ban of certain dog breeds will not address that.However, data from the Metropolitan Police shows that in incidents involving 'dangerously out of control dogs' banned breeds account for about 20% of offences. Defra says there is "a large number of serious cases from a very small population of dogs in circulation, and that is striking evidence that there is an issue with this particular type of dog", while a Member of Parliament said "Despite the fact that dogs on the exempt list must be muzzled in public, that breed still accounts for almost 20% of all reported attacks. We know also that pit bulls have been involved in seven of the 31 fatal attacks that have occurred since 2005. That is highly disproportionate for one type of dog that is banned, and it underlines the need to be cautious about change in this area."

A 1992 case involving a dog named Dempsey, a pit bull terrier, which, three years later, had its destruction order reversed, brought interest because of the lack of discretion that the Act gave magistrates regarding Section 1 dogs. Discretion was granted to magistrates with the 1997 amendment to the Act. In the case of R (Sandhu) v. Isleworth Crown Court [2012], the claimant, Sandhu, was in prison and sought to nominate a temporary keeper to have his dog. The judicial review held that a person does have the right to nominate a person to temporarily keep the dog. This decision has more recently been more regulated to only allow for temporary keepership in certain circumstances.

The act only covers dog attacks causing physical injury to a human, not physical injury or death to other animals, and does not cover mental injury to a human witnessing such an attack (PTSD, for example). Efforts have been made to get the law changed. In some cases, injuries to humans have been ignored or not taken seriously by authorities because they were caused during a dog-on-dog attack.

A 2018 proposal by PETA to have the Staffordshire Bull Terrier and American Bulldog added to the list of banned dogs spawned a petition in support of the Staffordshires which garnered 160,000 signatures. The proposal was debated by Parliament and rejected. George Eustice declared, "The Government have no plans at all to add Staffordshire bull terriers, or any other type of dog, to the list of prohibited dogs."

== See also ==
- Fatal dog attacks in the United Kingdom
- Breed-specific legislation
- Dog attack
- Dogs Act
- Dog licence
- Dog bite
- Dog bite prevention
- Status dog

== Bibliography ==
- The Turbulent Years Hardcover – 13 Sep 1993 by Kenneth Baker pge 433-36 ISBN 978-0571170777
