= Dogs (Protection of Livestock) Act 1953 =

Act of the Parliament of the United Kingdom

Dogs (Protection of Livestock) Act 1953 (Note: Section 4(1).)
- Act of Parliament
- Parliament of the United Kingdom
- Long title: An Act to provide for the punishment of persons whose dogs worry livestock on agricultural land; and for purposes connected with the matter aforesaid.
- Citation: 1 & 2 Eliz. 2. c. 28
- Territorial extent: England and Wales; Scotland; (Note: Section 4(2).)

Dates
- Royal assent: 14 July 1953
- Commencement: 14 July 1953 (Note: The Acts of Parliament (Commencement) Act 1793.)
Other legislation
Amended by	Wildlife and Countryside Act 1981; Protection of Wild Mammals (Scotland) Act 2002; Dogs (Protection of Livestock) (Amendment) (Scotland) Act 2021; Dogs (Protection of Livestock) (Amendment) Act 2025

Status: Amended

Text of statute as originally enacted

Text of the Dogs (Protection of Livestock) Act 1953 as in force today (including any amendments) within the United Kingdom, from legislation.gov.uk.

The Dogs (Protection of Livestock) Act 1953 (1 & 2 Eliz. 2. c. 28) is an act of the Parliament of the United Kingdom devised to protect livestock from dogs. The act outlines punishment of dog owners whose dogs worry livestock on agricultural land. Protected livestock is defined as cattle, sheep, goats, swine, horses and domestic poultry. Game birds are specifically excluded.

== Potential repeal in 2021 ==
The proposed Animal Welfare (Kept Animals) Bill would have repealed this act.

== See also ==
- Dogs Act
