= Dogs Act 1906 =

Act of the Parliament of the United Kingdom

Dogs Act 1906 (Note: Section 11.)
- Act of Parliament
- Parliament of the United Kingdom
- Long title: An Act to consolidate and amend the Enactments relating to injury to live stock by Dogs, and otherwise to amend the Law relating to Dogs.
- Citation: 6 Edw. 7. c. 32
- Territorial extent: United Kingdom

Dates
- Royal assent: 4 August 1906
- Commencement: 1 January 1907
- Repealed: Northern Ireland: 19 December 1983 (Note: The Dogs (1983 Order) (Commencement No. 2) Order (Northern Ireland) 1983 (SI 1983/376).)
Other legislation
Amends	See § Repealed enactments
Repeals/revokes	See § Repealed enactments
Amended by	Dogs (Amendment) Act 1928; Justices of the Peace Act 1949; Diseases of Animals Act 1950; Dog Licences Act 1959; Police Act 1964; Police (Scotland) Act 1967; Animals Act 1971; Statute Law (Repeals) Act 1976; Environmental Protection Act 1990; Statute Law (Repeals) Act 2004; Clean Neighbourhoods and Environment Act 2005
Repealed by	Northern Ireland: Dogs (Northern Ireland) Order 1983

Status: Partially repealed

Text of statute as originally enacted

Revised text of statute as amended

Text of the Dogs Act 1906 as in force today (including any amendments) within the United Kingdom, from legislation.gov.uk.

The Dogs Act 1906 (6 Edw. 7. c. 32) is an act of the Parliament of the United Kingdom that consolidated enactments relating to injury to livestock by dogs, and otherwise amended the law relating to dogs, in the United Kingdom.

The main provisions relating to civil liability have now been repealed by the Animals Act 1971.

== Provisions ==
=== Repealed enactments ===
Section 10 of the act repealed 6 enactments, listed in the schedule to the act.

Citation	Short title	Extent of repeal
25 & 26 Vict. c. 59	Dogs (Ireland) Act 1862	The whole act
26 & 27 Vict. c. 100	Dogs (Scotland) Act 1863	The whole act
28 & 29 Vict. c. 60	Dogs Act 1865	The whole act
30 & 31 Vict. c. 134	Metropolitan Streets Act 1867	Section eighteen to "by reason of such detention."
34 & 35 Vict. c. 56	Dogs Act 1871	Section one, and section five from "The expression 'police district'" to the end of the section
55 & 56 Vict. c. 55	Burgh Police (Scotland) Act 1892	Section three hundred and ninety

== Subsequent developments ==
Dogs (Amendment) Act 1928 (Note: Section 4(1).)
- Act of Parliament
- Parliament of the United Kingdom
- Long title: An Act to amend the Dogs Act, 1906.
- Citation: 18 & 19 Geo. 5. c. 21
- Territorial extent: England and Wales; Scotland; (Note: Section 4(2).)

Dates
- Royal assent: 3 August 1928
- Commencement: 3 August 1928 (Note: The Acts of Parliament (Commencement) Act 1793.)
Other legislation
Amends	Dogs Act 1906
Amended by	Statute Law Revision Act 1927; Animals Act 1971; Animals (Scotland) Act 1987; Clean Neighbourhoods and Environment Act 2005

Status: Amended

Text of statute as originally enacted

Revised text of statute as amended

Text of the Dogs (Amendment) Act 1928 as in force today (including any amendments) within the United Kingdom, from legislation.gov.uk.

The act was amended in 1928 by the Dogs (Amendment) Act 1928} (18 & 19 Geo. 5. c. 21).

Section 5 of the act was repealed by section 16(1) of, and the schedule to, the Dog Licences Act 1959 (7 & 8 Eliz. 2. c. 55), which came into force on 16 October 1959.

Sections 8(c) and 9(a) of the act were repealed by section 1(1) of, and part III of schedule 1 to, the Statute Law (Repeals) Act 1976, which came into force on 27 May 1976.

The whole act was repealed for Northern Ireland by section 56(2) of, and schedule 2 to, the Dogs (Northern Ireland) Order 1983 (SI 1983/764 (N.I. 8)), which came into force on 19 December 1983.

Section 6 of the act was repealed by section 1(1) of, and group 1 of part 7 of schedule 1 to, the Statute Law (Repeals) Act 2004, which came into force on 22 July 2004.

== See also ==
- Dogs Act
