= Staffordshire Bull Terrier =

British breed of dog

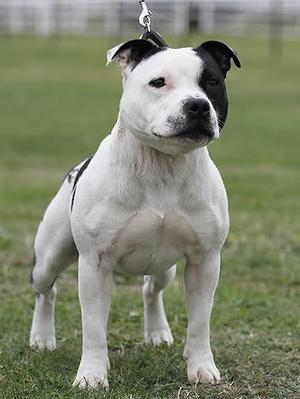
- Common nicknames: Stafford; Staffy
- Origin: United Kingdom
- Foundation stock: Bull and terrier; Old English Bulldog; Black and Tan Terrier
Traits
- Height: 36–41 cm (14–16 in)
Weight	Males	13–17 kg (29–37 lb)
	Females	11–15.4 kg (24–34 lb)
- Coat: smooth, short and close
- Colour: white; black, blue, fawn or red, all with or without white; any variety of brindle, with or without white
- Litter size: 5-7
Kennel club standards
- KC: standard
- Fédération Cynologique Internationale: standard

The Staffordshire Bull Terrier, also called the Staffy or Stafford, is a purebred dog of small to medium size in the terrier group that originated in the northern parts of Birmingham and in Staffordshire, for which it is named. They descended from 19th-century bull terriers that were developed by crossing bulldogs with various terriers to create a generic type of dog generally known as bull and terriers. Staffords share the same ancestry with the modern Bull Terrier, although the two breeds developed along independent lines, and do not resemble each other. Modern Staffords more closely resemble the old type of bull terrier and were first recognised as a purebred dog breed by The Kennel Club of Great Britain in 1935.

Within the broad sweep of dog history, the story behind the modern Stafford is rather brief and somewhat confusing because of the multiple aliases attached to these dogs in centuries past, such as the "Patched Fighting Terrier", "Staffordshire Pit-dog", "Brindle Bull" and "Bull-and-Terrier". Similar crosses also had aliases such as half-and-halves and half-breds. Blood sports such as bull-baiting and bear-baiting were outlawed with the passing of the Cruelty to Animals Act 1835 by Parliament, making it illegal to bait animals but promoting the matching of dogs against each other. Dog breeders migrated away from the heavier bulldogs, and introduced terrier blood into their crosses for gameness and agility. These bull and terrier crosses produced the ancestral breeding stock that, over the course of decades, evolved into the modern conformation show dogs we know today as the Staffordshire Bull Terrier and the Bull Terrier. It was shortly before the American Civil War that immigrants from Great Britain brought their bull and terrier crossbreeds into the U.S. They became the ancestral progenitors of the American Staffordshire Terrier (AmStaff), Miniature Bull Terrier, Boston Terrier and American Pit Bull Terrier.

== History ==
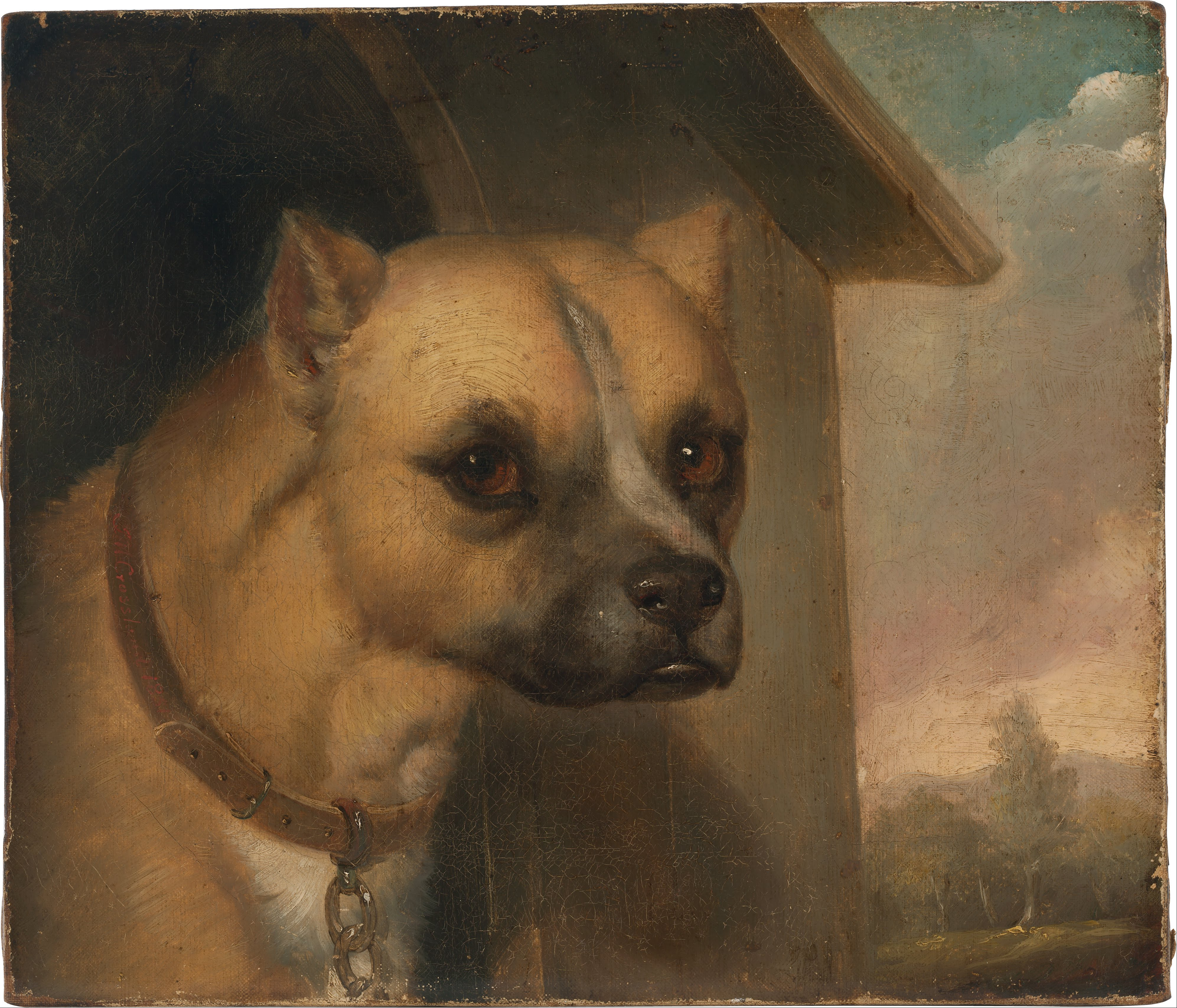
Staffordshire bull terrier by J. M. Crossland (1799–1858)

The unregulated breeding history and inconsistent genetic makeup of the Stafford's early ancestry have led to misconceptions about its origins. Individual types and styles of crossbred dogs varied by geographic region. For example, the progeny from one area may have a higher percentage of terrier than bulldog, whereas other reports claim that bulldog to terrier was preferred over bull and terrier to bull terrier. Dog breeders made careful selections to reinforce inheritable traits from specific dog types. Many of the mixed breed types, or mongrels that were used to create the early fighting dogs have long since evolved and stabilised into the modern purebred dogs we know today. Many of the desirable phylogenetic traits of the breed's ancestry have been preserved and further refined by selective breeding to better suit the Stafford's modern purpose as a conformation show dog, while the unwanted traits have been bred out.

=== Two Bull Terriers ===
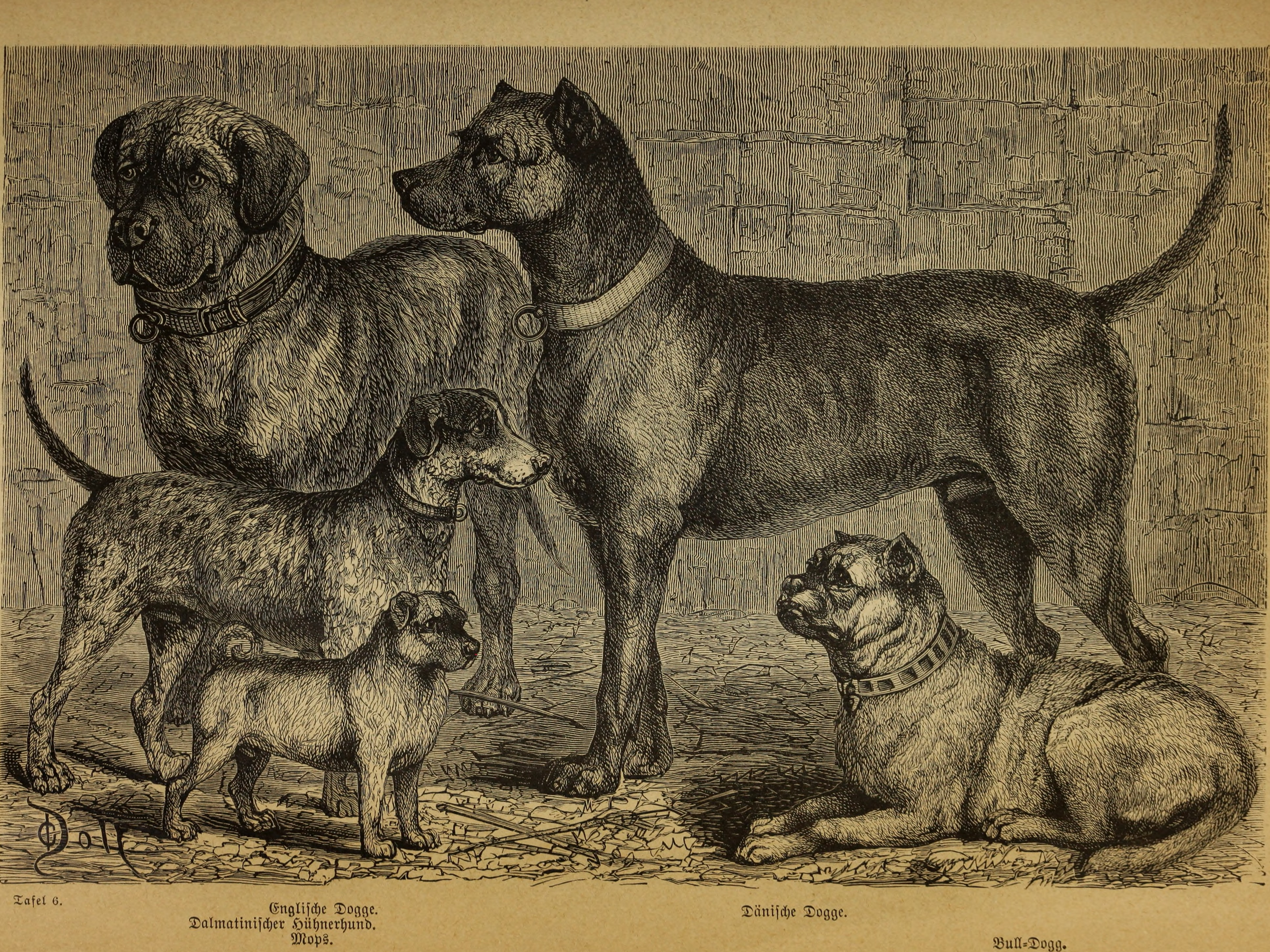
The dog and its races, 1876. left column: English Mastiff, Dalmatian Shepherd Dog, Pug; right column: Danish Mastiff, Bull-dog

In the mid–19th century, bull and terrier hybrids were known by several different aliases, such as the Patched Fighting Terrier, Staffordshire Pit-dog, Brindle Bull, and Bull-and-Terrier. They were also referred to as half-and-halfs, half-breds, or more commonly as the bull and terrier, although they were not true breeds in the same sense that modern dog breeds are known. However, at least six modern breeds can trace their ancestry to the bull and terrier crosses. Another common name used for bull and terrier was simply Bull Terrier, which became the name for the new breed that James Hinks developed. Hinks used various undocumented outcrosses, including Dalmatians and Collies, that devotees of the original strain considered undesirable. They chose instead to remain loyal to their preferred type. As a result, two different breeds of Bull Terriers emerged: the Bull Terrier, nicknamed the White Cavalier, and the Staffordshire Bull Terrier, named for the county where it was developed. The Bull Terrier's fighting heritage was left behind whereas breeders of Staffordshire Bull Terriers in the UK continued their illegal competitions which paralleled what was happening in the U.S. with the American Staffordshire Terrier; neither breed could gain official acceptance in their respective native lands. Journalist and dog expert Denise Flaim stated succinctly: "No established registry wanted to be affiliated with a dog that drew the blood of its own kind for a living."

=== Recognition as a purebred ===
Traceable pedigrees did not exist prior to the founding of The Kennel Club (KC) in 1873, which was initially formed by a group of dog show fanciers who wanted to preserve the reputation of dog shows, while at the same time, avoid breeder fraud by establishing a dog's identity and documenting its pedigree. The first volume of The Kennel Club Stud Book was published in 1874, and included a list of dog shows and names of dogs that were exhibited at each show, beginning with the first dog show in 1859. Bull Terriers, and Bulldogs were also recognised and included in the first volume. However, it was not until 1935 that the Staffordshire Bull Terrier was officially recognised by the KC. It was much later, in 1974, that the American Kennel Club (AKC) accepted the Staffordshire Bull Terrier into its breed registry as its 121st official breed.

=== Shared ancestry ===
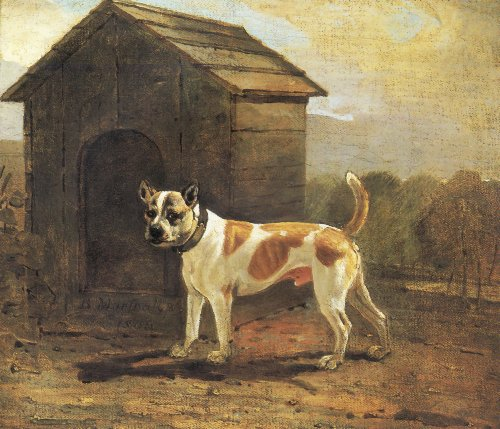
Dustman, bull and terrier, Benjamin Marshall 1804

Of the six distinct breeds that descended from the bull and terrier breeds, five are recognised by the AKC in the following order: Bull Terrier, Boston Terrier, American Staffordshire Terrier (AmStaff), Staffordshire Bull Terrier, and Miniature Bull Terrier. The same five breeds are also recognised by the Canadian Kennel Club (CKC). The Kennel Club (KC) recognises only four of the breeds and does not accept the AmStaff or American Pit Bull Terrier (APBT). The APBT is recognised by the United Kennel Club (UKC).

The KC, which was the first breed registry to accept the newly developed Staffordshire Bull Terrier into its Stud Book, stated that the breed "shares the same ancestry as the Bull Terrier, i.e. Bulldog crossed with the Black and Tan terrier, and was developed as a fighting dog." They further acknowledged that because of the dog's "early association with fighting it was, for some time, difficult to get recognition for the breed and it was not until the 1930s that The Kennel Club recognised the breed." The Canadian Kennel Club (CKC) did not recognise the Stafford until 1952, and afforded more credence to the breed's bull and terrier heritage: "The Bull and Terrier might have disappeared if not for a group of fanciers led by Joseph Dunn, who appreciated the dogs for their own sakes and persuaded The Kennel Club (England) to recognise the breed as the Staffordshire Bull Terrier, the name of the English county where the breed was most popular."

=== Other theories of origin ===
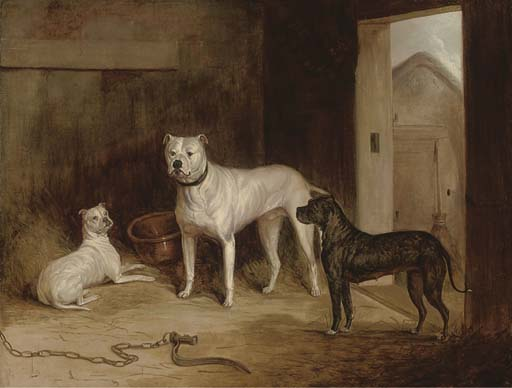
Bulldog and two Bull Terriers circa 19th century

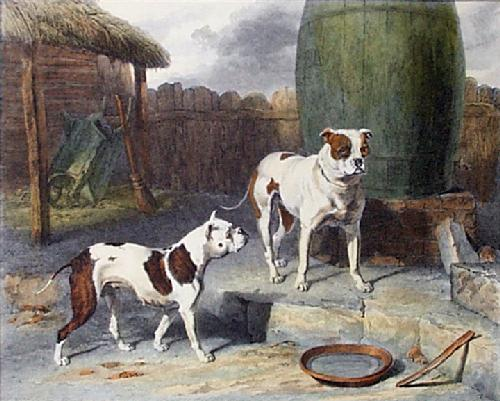
"Crib and Rosa" circa 1817 Abraham Cooper (1787–1868)

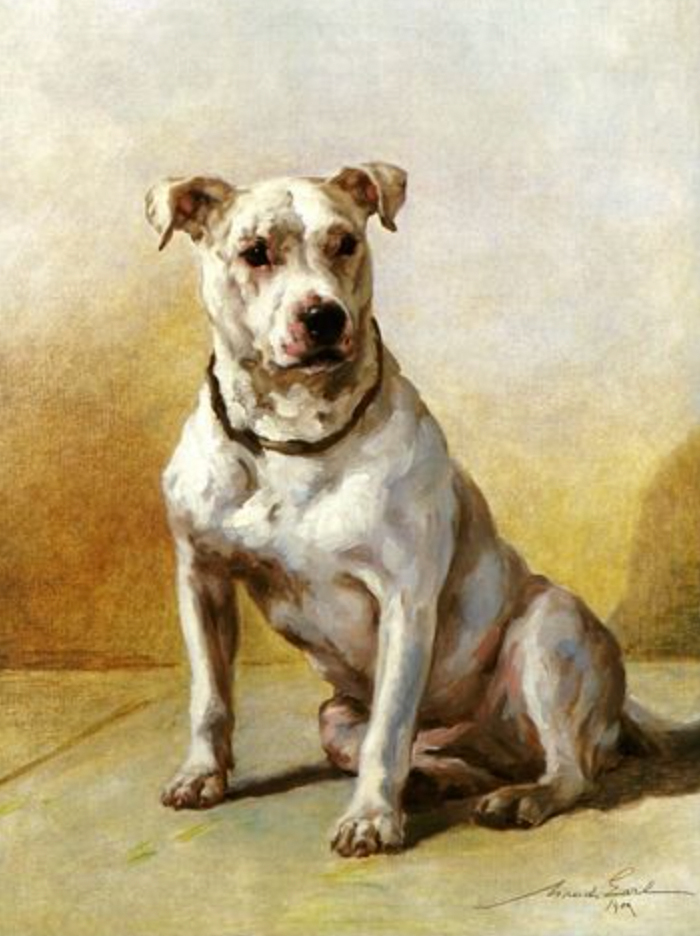
Bull Terrier by Maud Earl, circa 1909

When comparing the centuries-old bull and terrier to the modern Stafford, Joanna de Klerk, DVM, author of The Complete Guide to Staffordshire Bull Terriers (2019), said that "being so similar to the original Old English Bulldog, which has since been bred beyond recognition, some argue the Staffy originates solely from that breed rather than having any Terrier in the mix." Part of the confusion and misconceptions about the breed is due to the breed's inconsistent genetic makeup as a result of unregulated breeding practices beginning with the Staffy's origins and continuing much later into its development, well before traceable pedigrees existed. It is generally accepted that the Stafford descended from the 19th-century bulldog–terrier crosses that were later bred for dog fighting after blood sports were declared illegal. But it wasn't until the early 20th century, well after selective breeding refined the bull and terrier crosses into what became the English Bull Terrier, that the Stafford eventually emerged, a breed standard was created, and in 1935, the Staffordshire Bull Terrier was officially recognised by the KC.

In the spring 2013 issue of The Stafford Knot, Jason Nicolai describes some important evolutionary factors in the breed standards of the Staffordshire Bull Terrier that are "very often misquoted and misunderstood." The standard for the modern Stafford aligns with the breed's transformation from its bull and terrier ancestry as a fighting dog to a modern conformation show dog. Some book authors have compared nineteenth-century drawings or paintings to the visual appearances of modern Staffords. Author and Stafford enthusiast, James Beaufoy, wrote in his book Staffordshire Bull Terriers: a practical guide for owners and breeders (2016) that there is "interesting evidence" in some of the early 19th-century paintings that depict conformation and coat colour similarities of the modern Stafford when compared to the Old English Bulldog. One such painting is by artist Abraham Cooper (1817), titled Crib and Rosa.

A.W.A Cairns was the editor of the online Stafford Magazine. Cairns believed a "Stafford-like animal existed at the turn of the 19th Century" and admitted, with the "possibility for slight prejudice", that "the only modern dog of this type is the Staffordshire Bull Terrier". However, Cairns does clarify that the pedigree inscribed on the plaque of the Crib and Rosa painting, specifically the words "the famous Staffordshire bitch", is not suggesting that it was a Staffordshire Bull Terrier, but that "it could be concluded that animals of that type, existed in that county before 1816." The writings of both Cairns and Beaufoy align in that the "Staffordshire Bull Terrier is a relatively 'new breed'" in the context of when it was first recognised by the KC.

In October 1987, Cairns wrote in the Kennel Gazette that "Kennel Club recognition of the breed is shrouded in mystery. Recognition was announced in the April 1935 Kennel Gazette in the name of Staffordshire Bull Terrier. There was no explanation as to how this came about. No Breed Club or Breed Standard existed." Cairns also drew attention to the similarities in the Bull Terrier and Stafford in the late 19th century, prior to the downface feature of the modern Bull Terrier: "At that time 'Bull Terriers' could be registered 'Sire, Dam and date of birth unknown', so in effect any dog could be registered as a 'Bull Terrier'. In consequence, many of the dogs registered were found to be, what became known as Staffordshire Bull Terriers."

=== DNA analysis ===
In 2017, a genome-wide study suggested that all of the bull and terrier–type dogs, including the Staffordshire Bull Terrier and five other distinct breeds, map back to the terriers of Ireland and to origins which date to the period 1860–1870. The timing corresponds with historical descriptions of dog fighting competitions in Ireland, a lack of accurate stud book documentation, and, as a result, undocumented dog crosses at the time when these breeds were first created.

DNA studies have brought some clarity to the hybridisation mystery of bull and terrier crossbreeding, suggestive of a New World dog within some modern breeds, but they do not positively identify all the breeds that were involved. As supported by the DNA study, as well as the AKC and KC, references to the historic bull and terrier were not as a bona fide breed; rather, the term was used to describe a heterogeneous group of dogs that may include purebreds of different breeds, or crosses of those breeds. Bull and terrier hybrids, or pit bull types are considered the forerunner of several modern standardised breeds.

=== Early protection ===
The Cruelty to Animals Act 1835 made blood sports illegal, and effectively stopped bull- and bear-baiting in the UK. Baiting required large arenas which made it easier for authorities to police, whereas illegal dog fighting was much harder to eliminate because fight sponsors kept their venues hidden and closely guarded in private basements and similar locations. As a result, dog fighting continued long after bull- and bear-baiting had ceased. It was not until the passage of the Protection of Animals Act 1911 that organised dog fighting in Britain largely came to an end.

=== The Kennel Club ===
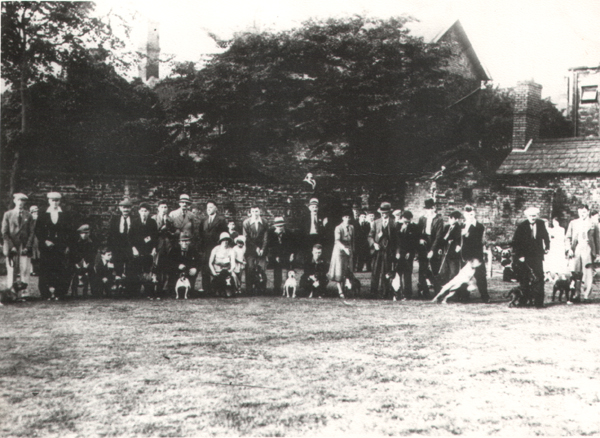
First ever Staffordshire Bull Terrier show, Cradley Heath 1935

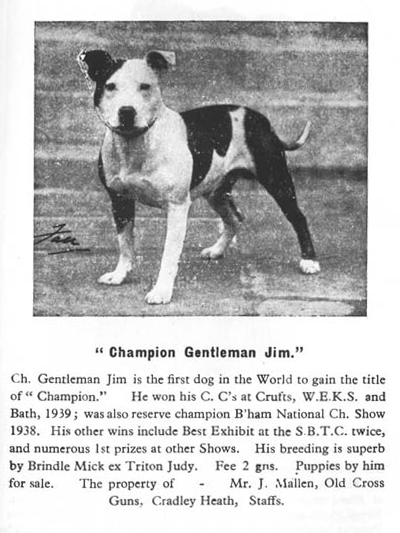

"The early proto-staffords provided the ancestral foundation stock for the Staffordshire Bull Terrier, the American Pit Bull Terrier and the American Staffordshire Terrier." In 1930, the name "Staffordshire Bull Terrier" first appeared in advertisements for dogs of the type. Throughout 1932 and 1933, attempts to achieve Kennel Club (KC) recognition for the breed were made by dog-show judge and breeder, Joseph Dunn, but the Stafford's early origins as a fighting dog made it difficult to gain acceptance. In early 1935, Dunn obtained permission from the KC to hold a variety dog show to see if it would attract Stafford owners to show their dogs; he offered cash as a special attraction. The show was held in April 1935 and was a success.

In May 1935, the KC approved the name "Staffordshire Bull Terrier"; the first name requested, "Original Bull Terrier", had been rejected. Dunn decided to form a club and invited other dog breeders to participate. In June 1935, the Staffordshire Bull Terrier Club was formed during a meeting at the Old Cross Guns pub in Cradley Heath; a breed standard was approved the same day, and further shows were held that year. Other pivotal breeders involved in acquiring breed recognition were Joe Mallen and actor Tom Walls. The first champions recognised in England were the bitch Lady Eve and the stud Gentleman Jim in 1939.

Phil Drabble reported that among the various types of bull and terrier, the type from Cradley Heath was recognised as a separate breed to be named the Staffordshire Bull Terrier. It was subsequently accepted by The Kennel Club in July 1935, marking an official milestone for the Staffordshire Bull Terrier's acceptance into the KC's breed registry.

=== FCI ===
In 1954, the breed was recognised by the Fédération Cynologique Internationale located in Thuin, Belgium.

=== American Kennel Club ===
The Staffordshire Bull Terrier, the Bull Terrier, and the American Staffordshire Terrier are three distinct modern purebred dogs in the AKC Terrier group, all with a similar ancestry. Historically, the Staffordshire Terriers had arrived in America by the mid-1800s. After their arrival, two distinct breeds were developed, one of which some American breeders developed into a taller, heavier offshoot of the English version which became the American Staffordshire Terrier.

Initially, the AKC refused to recognise any breeds that were associated with dog fighting. The early Bull Terrier breed developed by James Hinks as a conformation show dog was recognised by the AKC in 1885. Nearly 50 years later, in 1936, AKC recognised the Staffordshire Terrier, later changing the breed's name to the American Staffordshire Terrier to avoid confusion with the English version. In an effort to achieve AKC recognition of the English Stafford, Steve Stone organised the US Staffordshire Bull Terrier Club on 14 January 1967. There were few Staffords in the country at the time, most being imports from Australia, Canada, New Zealand, and other parts of the world.

The first attempts to encourage club membership and gain AKC recognition began with a rally held in the summer of 1967 which resulted in 14 memberships and 8 Staffords registered by the club. By year's end the count had increased to 39 registered dogs. Dog imports continued and the number of memberships and registered dogs increased, but it took nearly a decade of hosting sanctioned shows and demonstrating consistency in the breed standard by maintaining responsible breeding practices before the club acquired official AKC recognition.

In 1974, AKC officially recognised the Staffordshire Bull Terrier Club, giving it recognition as the official AKC Parent Club representing the breed. The first Stafford to be registered and entered into the AKC Stud Book was Ch. Tinkinswood Imperial, an English import. An Australian import, Northwark Becky Sharpe, was the first U.S. champion.

== Characteristics ==
=== Appearance ===
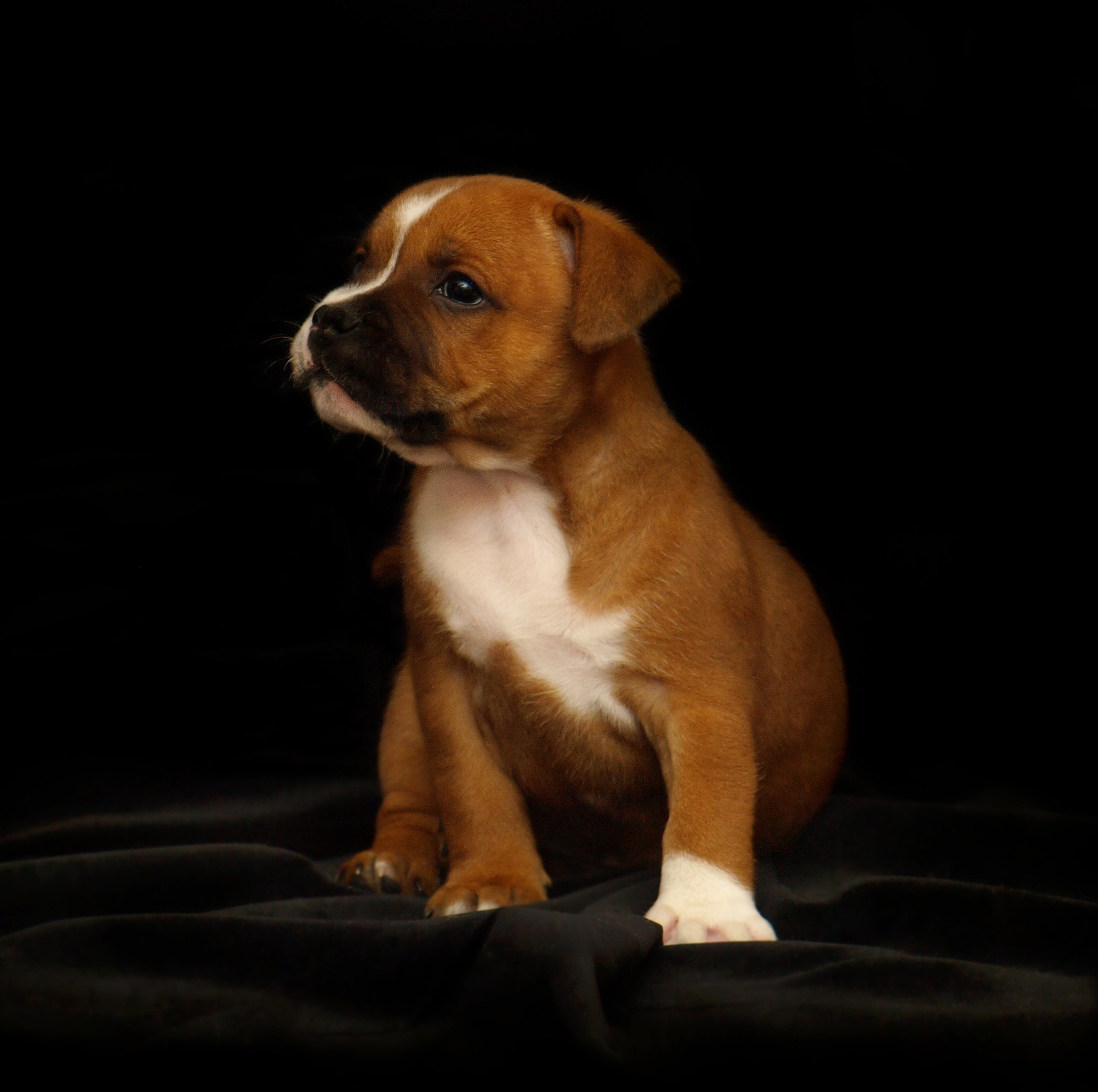
Staffordshire Bull Terrier puppy

The Stafford is short-haired, and of roughly equal length from the withers to the tail and from the withers to the ground. The coat is short, stiff and close. It may be white; black, blue, fawn or red, all with or without white; or any variety of brindle, with or without white. It has a broad head; the ears fold at the tip. It is muscular and well-boned, with strong shoulders, a wide chest and wide-set legs. It is agile and quite active. It is a terrier, and is so classified by the Kennel Club and the Fédération Cynologique Internationale. The dog usually stands 36–41 cm (14–16 in) at the withers. Dogs weigh about 13–17 kg (29–37 lb); bitches approximately 2 kg (4.4 lb) less.

=== Temperament ===
The Stafford has a reputation for pugnacity; when challenged by another dog it is known to not back away. They have a mixed reputation in the UK, with some people associating the breed with chavs.

The Kennel Club notes that the breed is “bold, fearless and totally reliable” and well suited to families, with the breed standard noting its particular affinity with children.

== Health ==
A 2022 UK study of veterinary records found the breed to have a life expectancy of 11.33 years, slightly below the life expectancy of crossbreeds: 11.82 but just above the overall average of 11.23 years. A 2024 UK study found a life expectancy of 12 years for the breed compared to an average of 12.7 for purebreeds and 12 for crossbreeds.

A UK study found a predisposition to juvenile onset demodicosis in the Staffordshire Bull Terrier: In dogs under the age of two years 2.14% of Staffords had demodicosis compared to 0.48% overall. An American study found the same predisposition with 10% of Staffords having the condition compared to 0.58% overall.

Neurological disorders identified in the breed include cerebellar abiotrophy, Chiari-like malformation, myotonia congenita and L-2-hydroxyglutaric aciduria. The Staffordshire Bull Terrier is one of the most commonly affected breeds for hereditary cataracts.

== Popularity and use ==
The Stafford is considered a family pet and companion dog, and is among the breeds recommended by the KC for families. Relative to the breed's ancestral progenitors, the AKC states: "From his brawling past, the muscular but agile Staffordshire Bull Terrier retains the traits of courage and tenacity. Happily, good breeding transformed this former gladiator into a mild, playful companion with a special feel for kids."

In the decade 2011–2020, annual registrations with the KC fell from about 7000 to about 5000; in 2019 and 2020 it had the highest number of registrations in the Terrier group. It is among the most frequently registered breeds in Australia, France, and New Zealand. In the United States, it was in 81st place on an AKC list of registrations by number in 2020.

== Pit bull comparisons ==
Modern Staffords are often confused with the fighting pit bull-types because they share common ancestors that date back to the early 1800s when pit fighting was a popular sport. As a result, Staffords are considered among the breeds with a stigma attached relative to the "chav culture", and have been termed "status dogs". Globally, pit bull-types including Staffordshire Bull Terriers have made local news for acts of aggression, but breed advocates have raised questions about the veracity of visual breed identification, and media hype. News reports often treat the breed as one that attacks other dogs. Similar breeds have been associated with bites to humans.

Early DNA research found some genetic links between breed and behaviour. A 2022 study from the National Human Genome Research Institute described in detail how non-coding variations in the dog genome are associated with behavioural traits of various breeds. They found heritable patterns in terriers "consistent with working roles involving catching and killing prey". Another 2022 study, from the Broad Institute, concluded that most behavioural traits are heritable whereas behaviour "only subtly differentiates breeds". That study found that dog breeds that have been stereotyped as being aggressive, such as pit bull types, were not more aggressive than other dogs. The results of that paper indicate that dog behaviour is primarily "shaped by their environment, not their breed".

== Breed-specific legislation ==
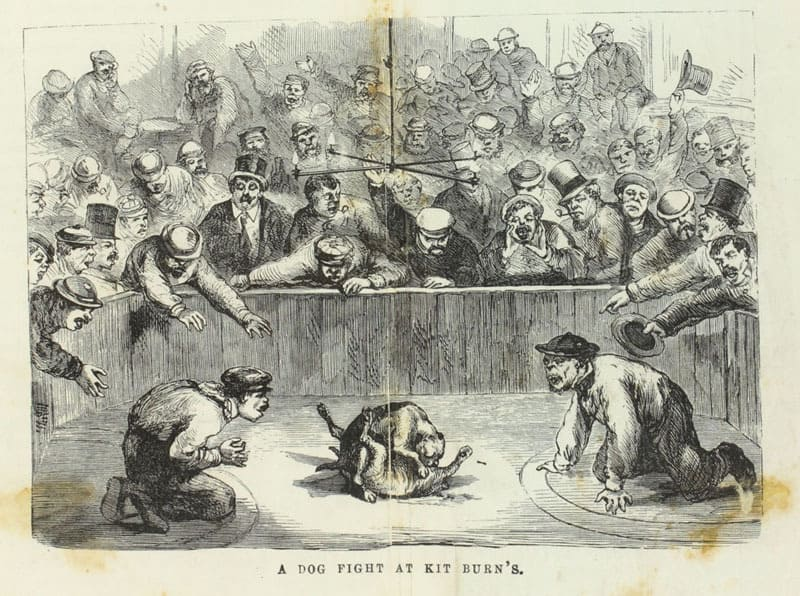
Kit Burns's Saloon, NY, by Edward Winslow Martin (James D. McCabe), "The Secrets of the Great City" (Philadelphia, 1868)

In 2018, People for the Ethical Treatment of Animals (PETA) lobbied the British Parliament to have the breed added to the list of restricted dog breeds in the Dangerous Dogs Act 1991. The Royal Society for the Prevention of Cruelty to Animals, the KC, Dogs Trust, Blue Cross, and the Battersea Dogs & Cats Home all objected to the proposal. The proposal was rejected by Parliament; therefore, Staffords are not banned under the UK's Dangerous Dogs Act 1991.

In the United States, dogs that are often defined as pit bulls and commonly banned in some counties include American Pit Bull Terriers, Staffords, American Staffordshire Terriers, and Bull Terriers. The CDC and ASPCA are among several agencies and organisations that have stood in opposition to the "theory underlying breed-specific laws—that some breeds bite more often and cause more damage than others, ergo laws targeting these breeds will decrease bite incidence and severity", as they do not believe it has been successful in practice. As of June 2017, there were 21 states in the US that prohibited breed-specific legislation.

=== Irish Staffordshire Bull Terrier misnomer ===
In the UK, American Pit Bull Terriers are sometimes advertised as "Irish Staffordshire Bull Terrier" in an attempt to circumvent the Dangerous Dogs Act 1991. The Irish Staffordshire Bull Terrier is not recognised as a breed by the Irish Kennel Club or any other kennel club.

== Notable dogs ==
- Watchman – since 1882, the military mascot of the Staffordshire Regiment.
- Cooper – adopted in 2018 by the Staffordshire Police, the first of the breed in that police force. He worked as police dog until 2022, visited schools and appeared on Crimewatch Live.

== Gallery ==
Images depicting standard colours and body shapes of Staffords
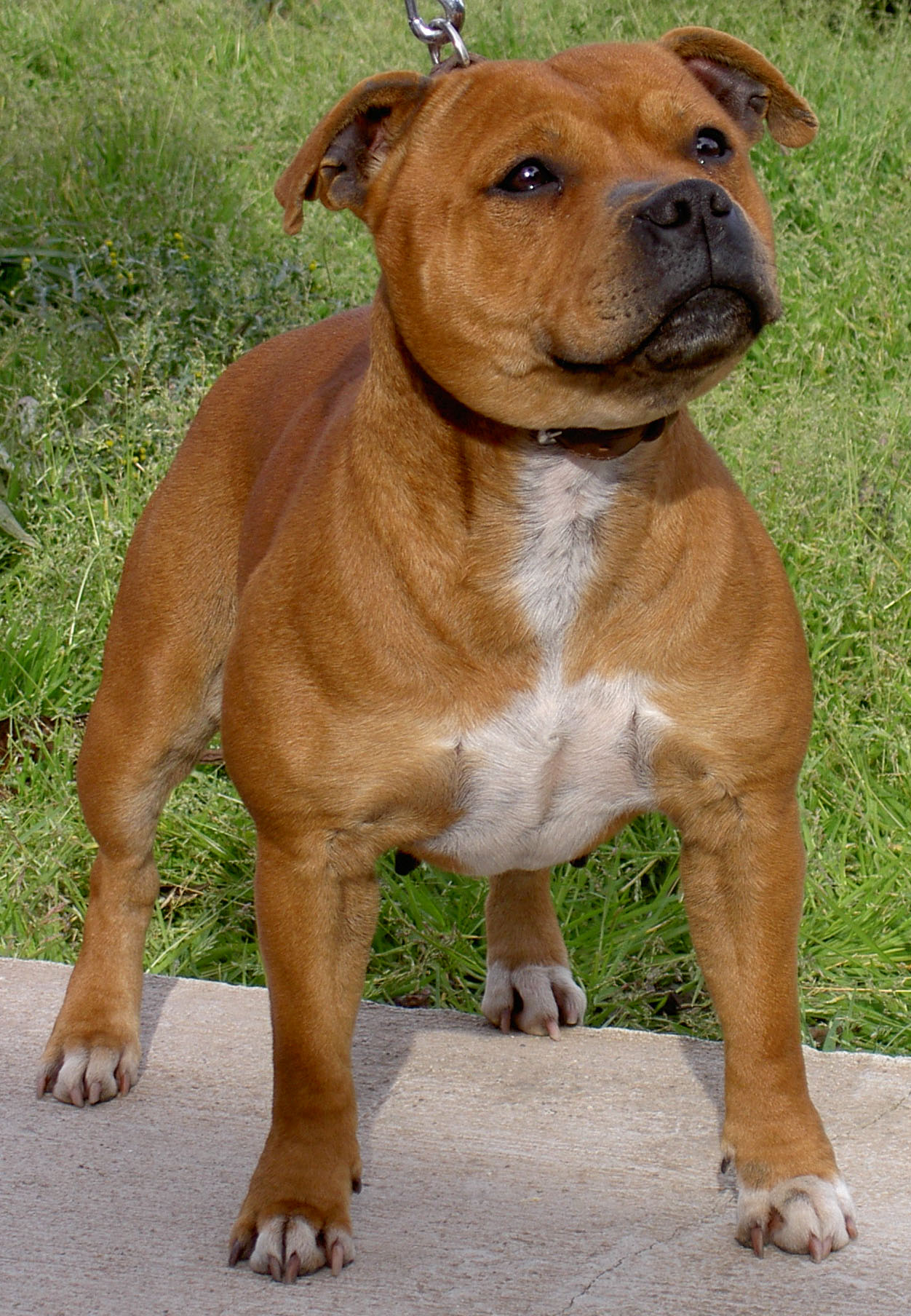
Red & white

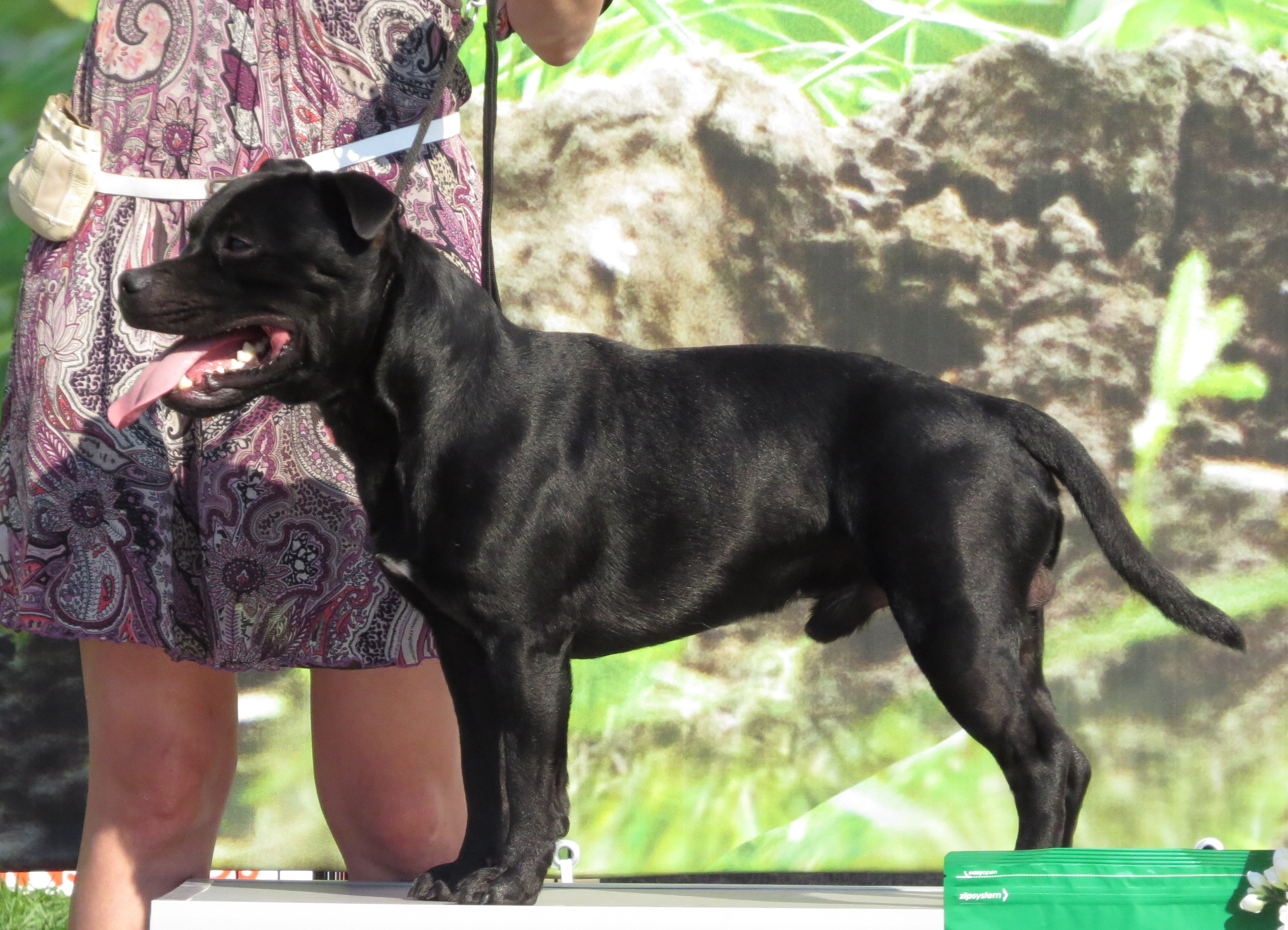
black

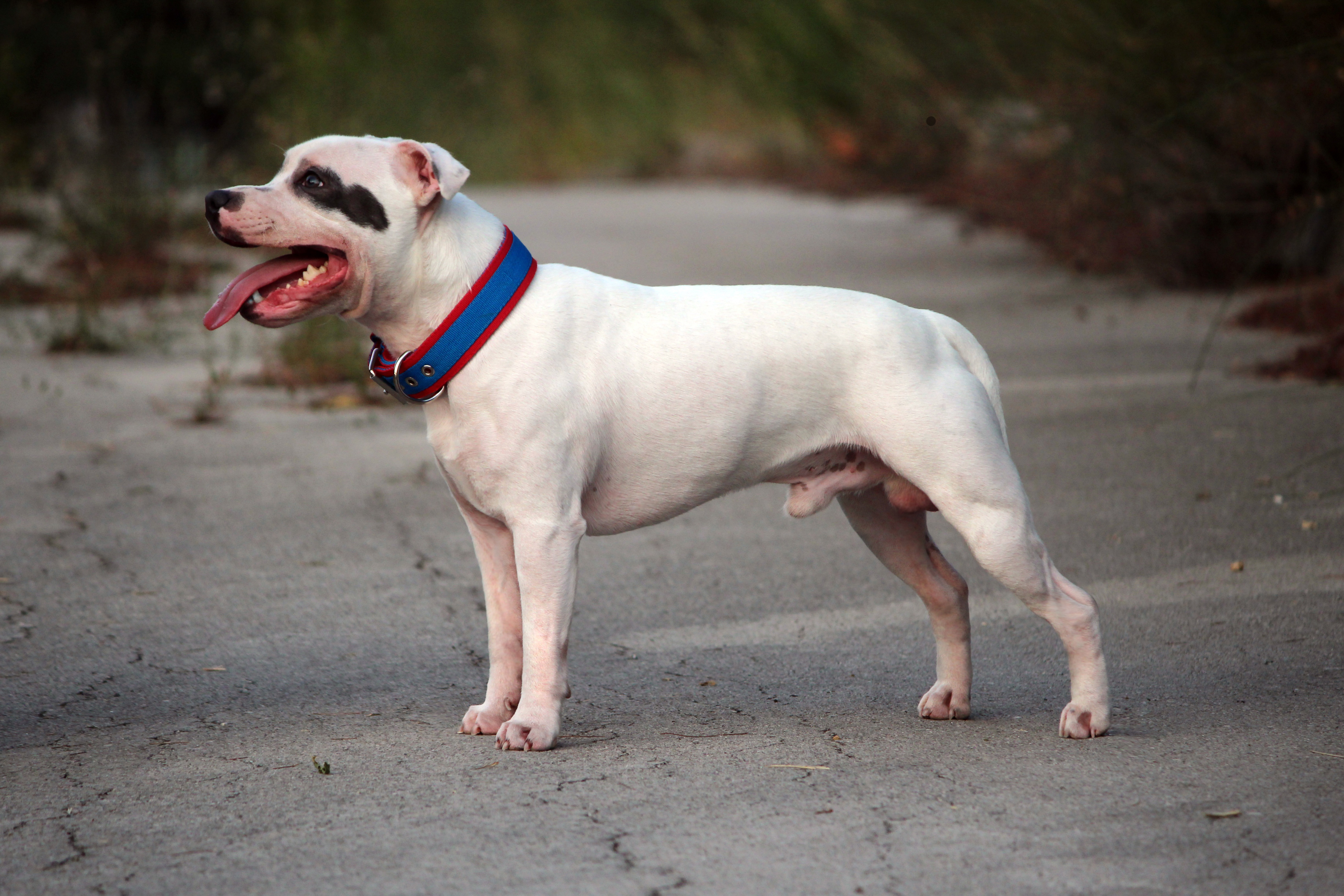

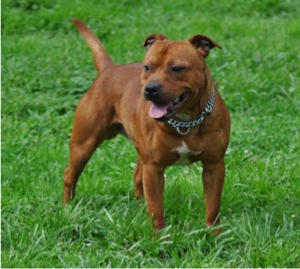
Red

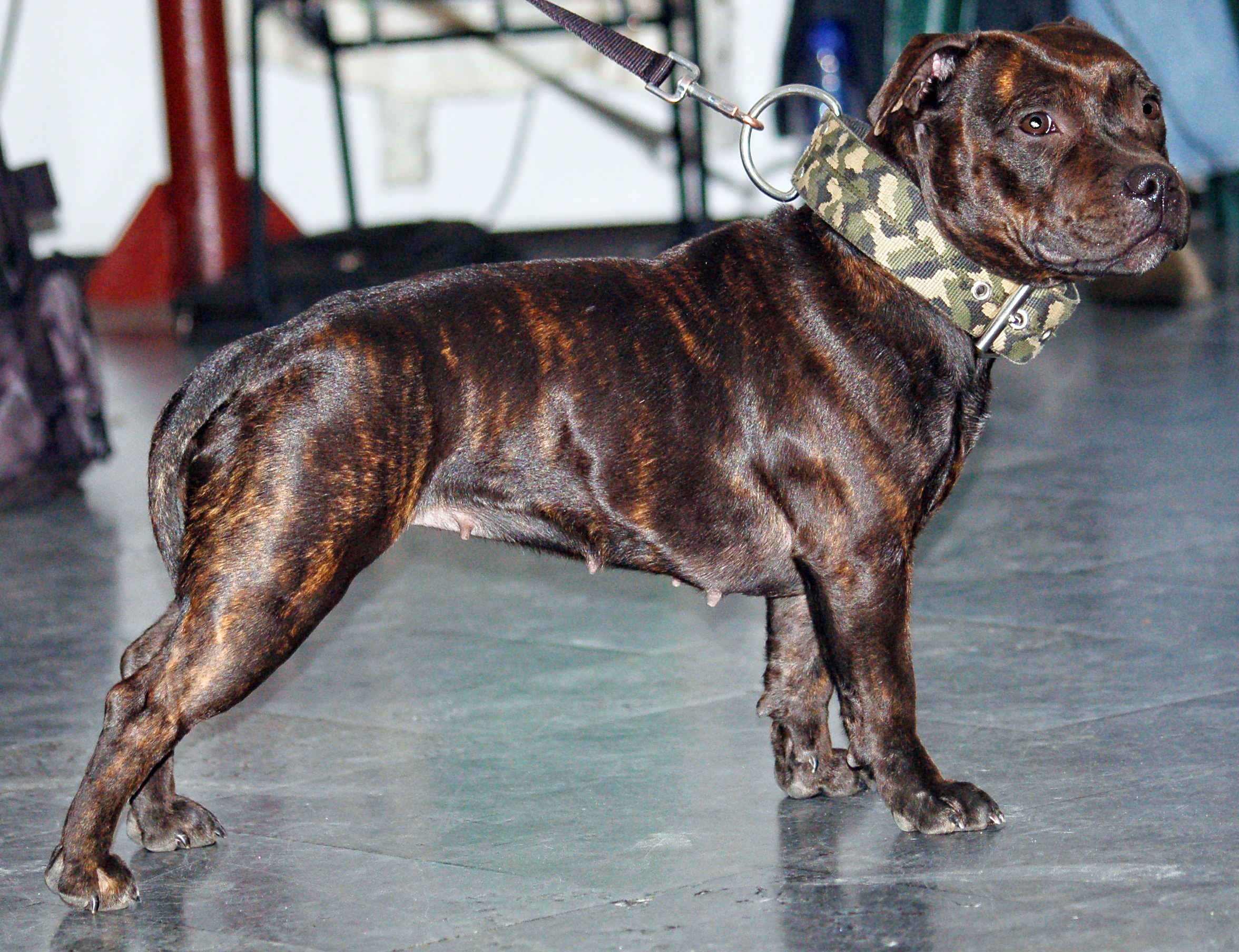
Brindle

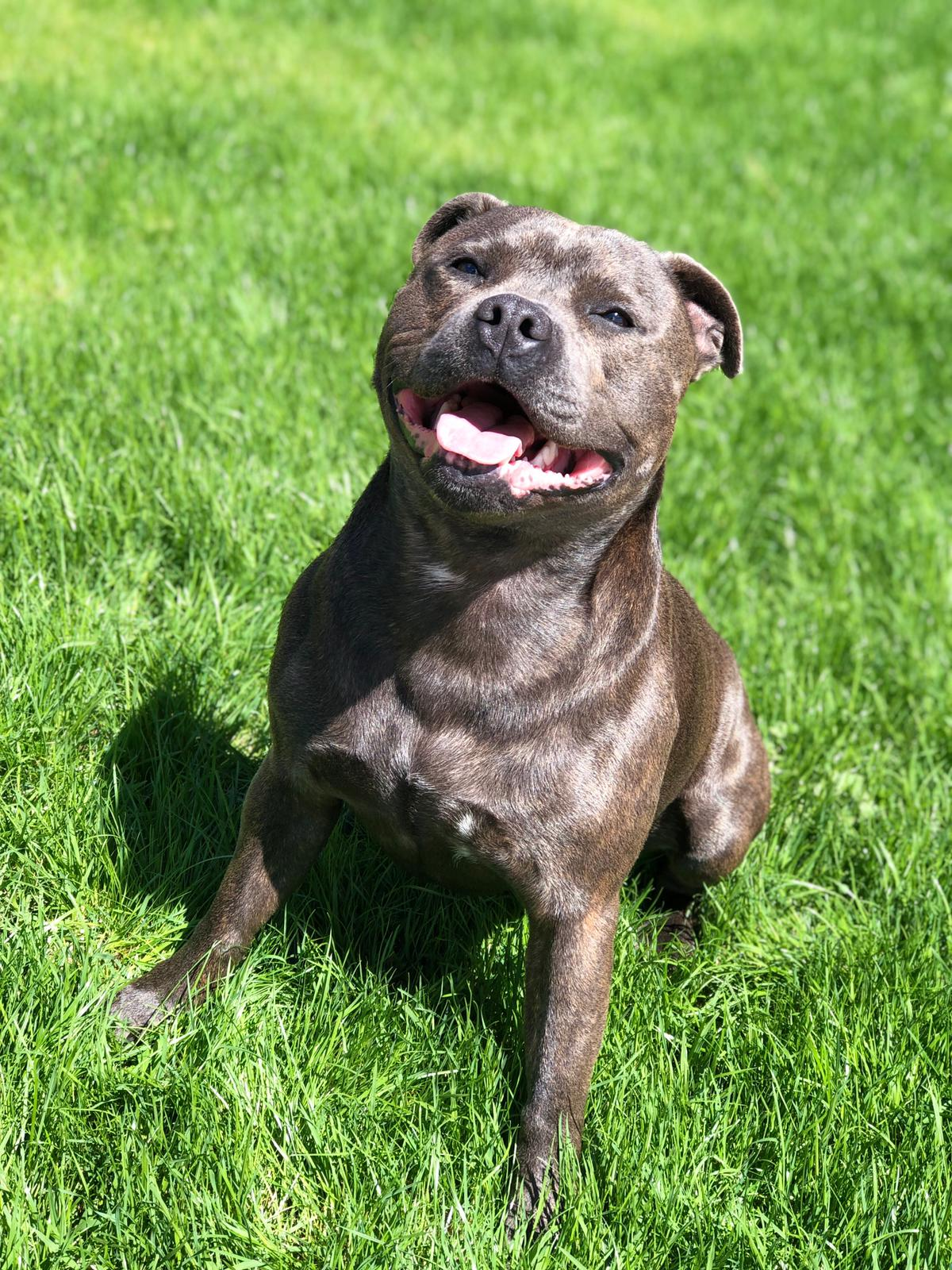
Blue

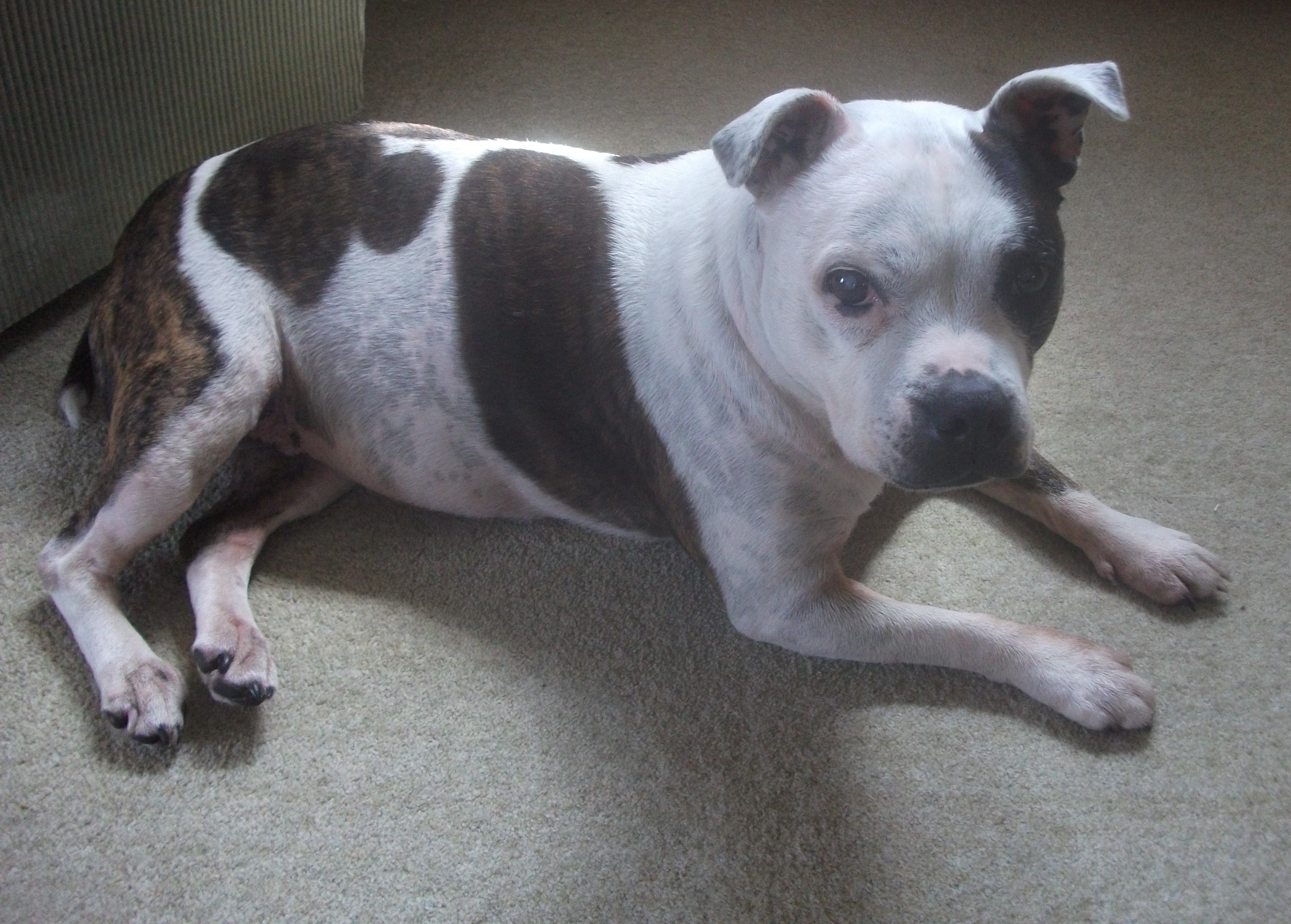
Brindle &white

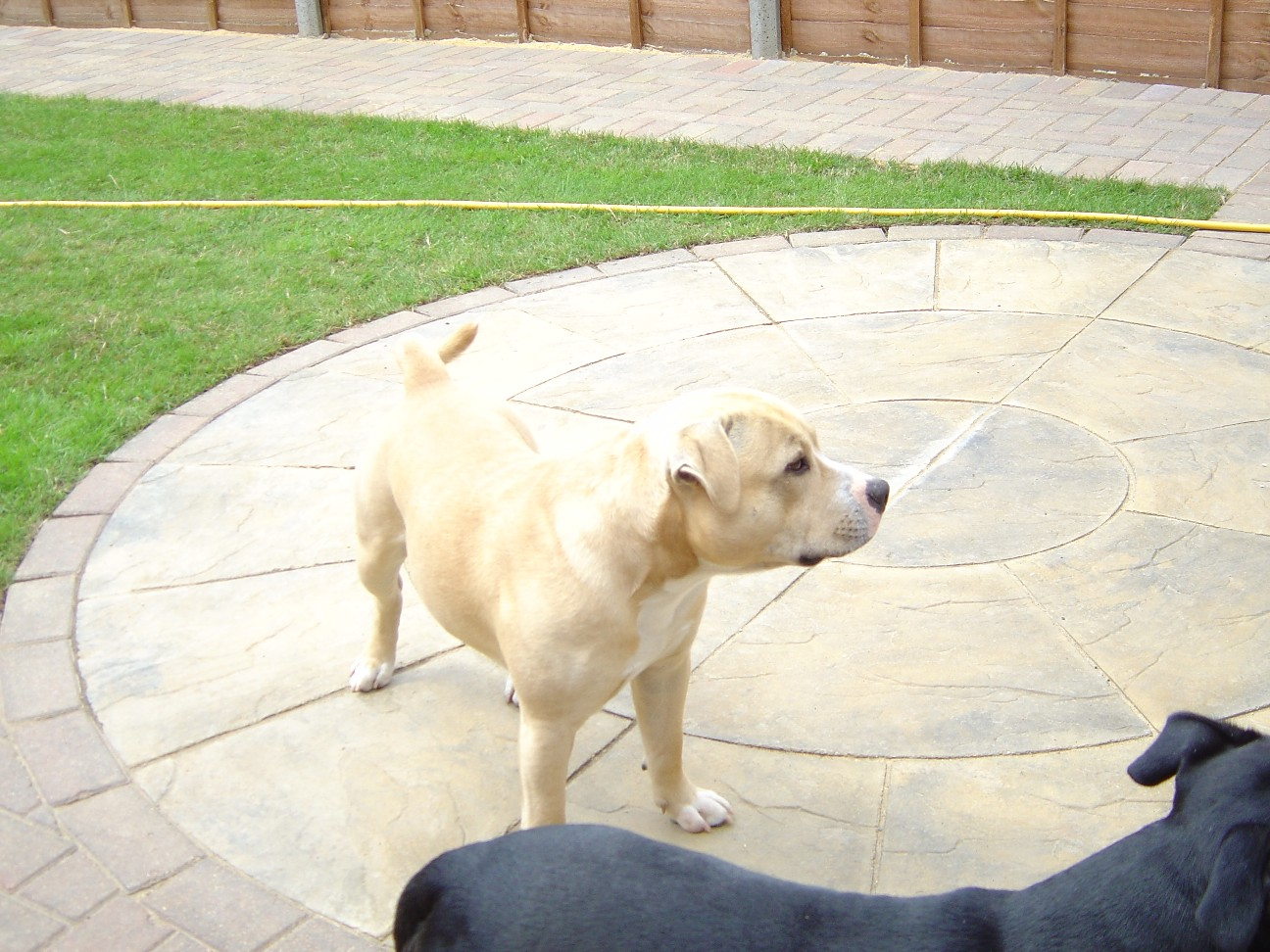
Fawn

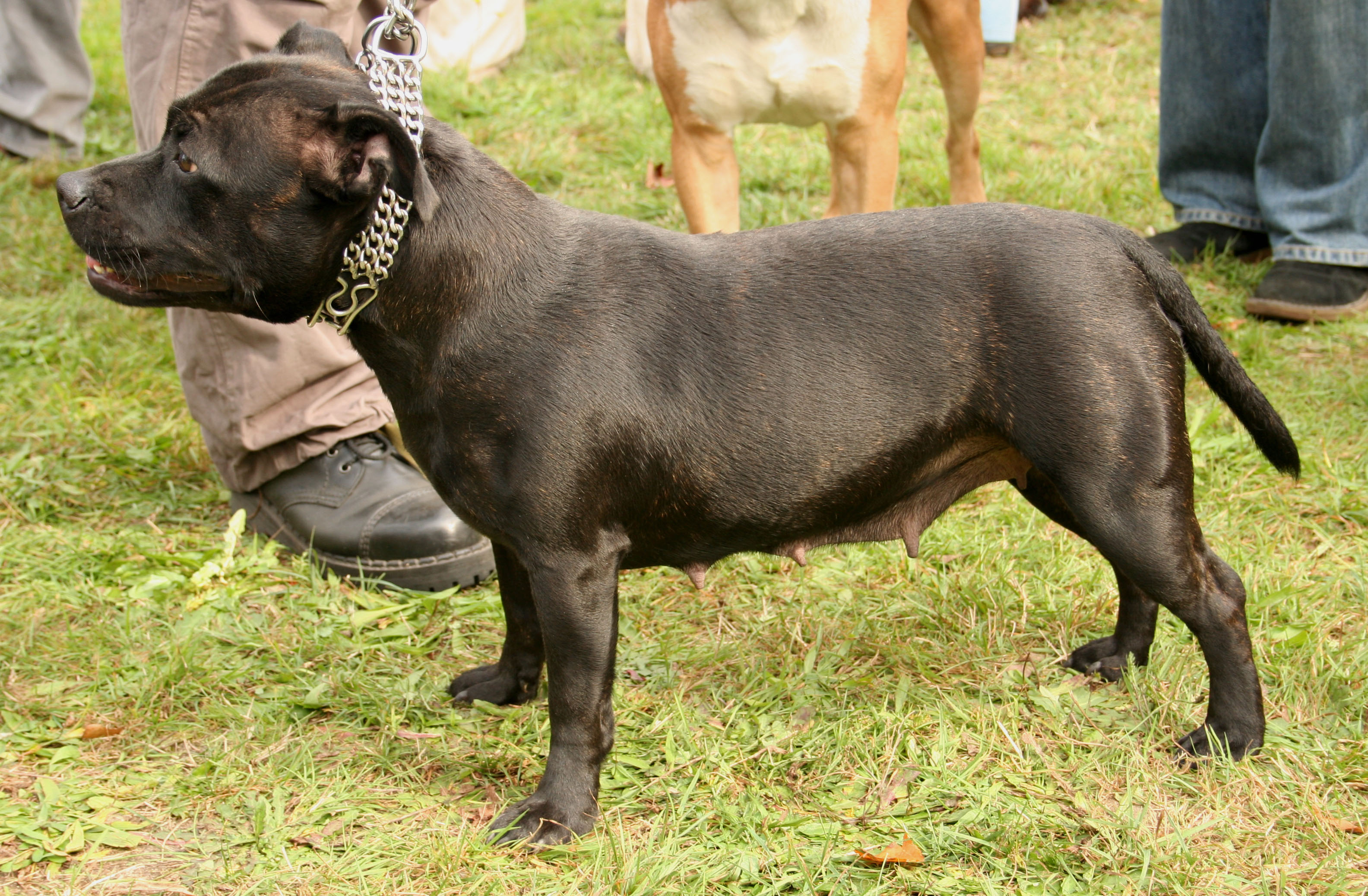
Black Brindle
