= Status dog =

Dog kept to add to an owner's tough image

Status dog is a term used in the United Kingdom to describe a potentially dangerous or aggressive dog that is kept as a symbol of the owner's hard or tough image, to intimidate others, and possibly as a weapon. This idea has persisted through centuries, tracing back to Roman times. More recently, after news of vicious dogs mauling young victims, the Dangerous Dogs Act 1991 placed restrictions on the ownership and care of five types of dog (the Pit Bull Terrier, the Japanese Tosa, the Dogo Argentino, the Fila Brasileiro, and since 2023 the XL Bully); while two further breeds, the Rottweiler and the Staffordshire Bull Terrier, are also widely perceived as status dogs. The UK has been taking steps to address the problem, starting with the Metropolitan Police establishing a dedicated Status Dog Unit in 2009.

== History ==
Throughout the ages, dogs have been used as tools for violence. As early as 7th century BC, there is historical evidence of weapon dogs being utilised by the Roman army. Varying historical circumstances began to build negative connotation with specific breeds, starting with bloodhounds in the 19th century. Bloodhounds received heavy criticism in America due to their involvement with tracking down runaways during the slavery era. The same fate awaited the Doberman breed, which initially were in high regard during the 1900s as symbols of nobility and trust. Their reputation plummeted once photographs emerged of German concentration camps during World War II, featuring Nazi officers and their Doberman pets. Government propaganda and popular media started portraying this breed, along with Rottweilers and German Shepherds, as 'demon dogs'.

Arguably the most notorious of status dogs, the pit bull type, can be traced back to the Middle Ages. This species was achieved through centuries of selective breeding, a method by which humans intentionally select animals with desirable physical traits to reproduce. The pit bull was made to be vicious, in order to be used for bull-baiting during the 1800s. The sport was eventually banned, which in turn resulted in a new blood sport, dog fighting.

This trend ultimately created the infamous public image of the pit bull, thus making way for street gangs to take advantage of it by adopting the use of pit bulls as symbols of strength and ferocity during the 1960s. Their image became worse in 1987, when a young boy was attacked and killed by a pit bull in California. Major magazine publications, like Sports Illustrated and Time, initiated the introduction of laws across the US banning specific dog breeds after running issues with pit bulls on the front cover, with titles such as "Beware of this dog" and "Time Bomb On Legs". In 1991, an incident similar to the pit bull mauling in California 1987 occurred in the UK, where a girl of six years was hospitalised after being mauled by a pit bull while playing outside in a park, which ultimately led to the Dangerous Dogs Act.

== Subtypes ==
- "Weapon Dogs" – referring to dogs who are used by their owners to intimidate or inflict physical harm on others. These dogs are seldom formally trained, and are often direct violations of the Dangerous Dogs Act 1991 (DDA) and the Guard Dogs Act 1975, which stipulate specific requirements for the care of such dogs.
- "Dangerous Dogs" – a legal term referring to dogs that are "dangerously out of control"

A dog shall be regarded as dangerously out of control on any occasion on which there are grounds for reasonable apprehension that it will injure any person, whether or not it actually does so, but references to a dog injuring a person or there being grounds for reasonable apprehension that it will do so do not include references to any case in which the dog is being used for a lawful purpose by a constable or a person in the service of the Crown.

— Section 10(3) of the Dangerous Dogs Act 1991 – DEFRA 2010:3.

== Breeding ==
Although owning and breeding certain types of status dogs is unlawful, people get around this by cross-breeding. Some of the most common motivations for breeding status dogs are profit and the desire to continue a dog's bloodline. The ideal mating age for dogs is 2 to 6 years old. However, more mature females (closer to 6 years old) tend to take better care of their pups, thus ensuring greater puppy health.

The ban of specific breeds under the DDA have resulted in numerous crossbreeds, as a means for breeders to avoid legal repercussions. These ambiguous mixes involving illicit breeds have been assigned various pseudonyms. For example, pit bull mixes are often labelled as:

- Irish Staff
- Long-Legged Staff
- Red-Nosed Staff
- Staff Cross

Often, the buyers of status dogs are not necessarily set on the specific breed. Instead, youths often look mainly at a pup's size, colour, and 'potential' when acquiring a status dog, given that they are purchased with the intention of looking tough. Buyers want pups that have the potential to grow large and strong.

== Addressing the situation ==
The Royal Society for the Prevention of Cruelty to Animals (RSPCA) is seeking to reform current legislation regarding dangerous dogs, the ultimate goal being that dogs would be judged solely by their behaviour, not by their breed. In his book, Unleashed: The Phenomena of Status Dogs and Weapon Dogs, Harding claims that the issue lies with the lack of education on animal treatment. Harding believes that banning breeds will not solve the status dog trend, and instead the efforts should be focused more on teaching young people how to take good care of animals. The RSPCA is currently working with the status dog unit within the Metropolitan Police for the sake of amending the Dangerous Dogs Act.
