= Dogs Act =

Stock short title used for UK legislation

Dogs Act (with its variations) is a stock short title used in the United Kingdom for legislation relating to dogs.

== List ==
- The Dogs Act 1871 (34 & 35 Vict. c. 56)
- The Dogs Act 1906 (6 Edw. 7. c. 32)
- The Dogs (Amendment) Act 1928 (18 & 19 Geo. 5. c. 21)
- The Dogs Amendment Act 1938 (1 & 2 Geo. 6. c. 21)
- The Dogs (Protection of Livestock) Act 1953 (1 & 2 Eliz. 2. c. 28)
- The Dogs (Fouling of Land) Act 1996 (c. 20)
- The Dangerous Dogs Act 1989 (c. 30)
- The Dangerous Dogs Act 1991 (c. 65)
- The Dangerous Dogs (Amendment) Act 1997 (c. 53)
- The Guard Dogs Act 1975 (c. 50)
- The Breeding of Dogs Act 1973 (c. 60)
- The Breeding of Dogs Act 1991 (c. 64)
- The Breeding and Sale of Dogs (Welfare) Act 1999 (c. 11)
- The Anti-Social Behaviour, Crime and Policing Act 2014 (c. 12) which covers criminal penalties related to acts with dogs

Acts of the Northern Ireland Assembly

- The Dogs (Amendment) Act (Northern Ireland) 2001 (c. 1 (N.I.))

Acts of the Scottish Parliament

- The Dog Fouling (Scotland) Act 2003 (asp 12)
- The Control of Dogs (Scotland) Act 2010 (asp 9)

== See also ==
- List of short titles
- Dog licence
