= Royal Kennel Club =

Official kennel club of the United Kingdom

- Formation: 4 April 1873; 153 years ago
- Type: Kennel club
- Headquarters: London, W1
- Coordinates: 51.5068°N 0.1448°W
- Region served: United Kingdom
- Official language: English
- Affiliations: The Kennel Club Charitable Trust
- Website: www.royalkennelclub.com
- Formerly called: The Kennel Club

The Royal Kennel Club (formerly The Kennel Club) is the official kennel club of the United Kingdom. Its role is to oversee various canine activities including dog shows and agility and working trials. It also operates the national register of pedigree dogs in the United Kingdom and acts as a lobby group on issues involving dogs in the UK.

The club has four principal physical locations. Its headquarters are on Clarges Street in Mayfair, London, incorporating a private members' club (with bar, lounge, and dining facilities), meeting and conference rooms, art gallery, library, picture library, and a residential apartment for the use of the Chairman. A second site at Aylesbury, Buckinghamshire, houses the administrative offices, and charitable trust headquarters. The third site is Stoneleigh Park in Warwickshire, where the Royal Kennel Club Building consists of a restaurant, an educational centre, and showground facilities. The fourth location is near Hexham, Northumberland, and is named the Emblehope and Burngrange Estate. It is the club's centre of excellence for working dogs, and consists of 7,550 acres of assorted terrains including farmland (with a working farm), moorland, and woodland. A gamekeeper is employed, enabling gun dogs to engage in shooting parties, whilst the farm has a population of sheep, enabling sheepdog breeds to be trained and demonstrated.

As of 2026, the Royal Kennel Club recognises 226 breeds of dog divided into seven breed groups: the Hound group, Working group, Terrier group, Gundog group, Pastoral group, Utility group and Toy group.

The club licenses dog shows throughout the UK, but the only dog show it actually runs is Crufts. The show has been held since 1928 and attracts competitors from all over the world. It is held every March at the NEC, Birmingham, and includes the less formal Scruffts show for crossbreed and mixed-breed dogs. The club also holds the Discover Dogs event in London every autumn.

The Royal Kennel Club is a non-member partner with the Fédération Cynologique Internationale.

== History ==
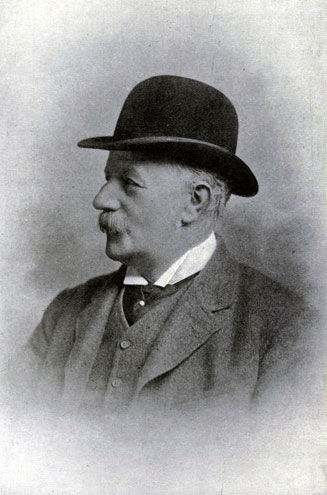
Sewallis Shirley, the founder of the Royal Kennel Club

The Royal Kennel Club was founded in 1873 after Sewallis E. Shirley became frustrated by trying to organise dog shows without a consistent set of rules.

Since the first dog show in 1859, shows had become increasingly popular. Shirley is listed as an exhibitor of Fox Terriers at the Birmingham Dog Show Society show in 1865. Together with a group of other gentlemen, he organised the First Grand Exhibition of Sporting and Other Dogs held at Crystal Palace in June 1870. The show was not a financial success and the organisers had to make up the loss.

This seems to have been the trigger for Shirley to call a meeting with 12 others who had an interest in judging and exhibiting pedigree dogs. The meeting, on 4 April 1873, agreed to set up what would become known as "The Kennel Club". It was held at 2 Albert Mansions, Victoria Street, London, a small flat with only three rooms. All business was conducted from there until a move to Pall Mall in May 1877.

It was decided they would be responsible for publishing a Stud Book and the first volume was published and ready to be distributed in December 1874. It listed pedigrees of dogs competing at shows from 1859 and also included a "Code of Rules for the guidance of Dog Shows and Field trials".

Shirley was appointed as chairman at the first annual general meeting of the Kennel Club on 1 December 1874.

After the Sex Discrimination Act 1975 was enacted, Florence Nagle was proposed as a member of the Kennel Club at the end of September 1977; the nomination was refused in January 1978 because the Kennel Club's constitution restricted membership to men only. Nagle referred the matter to an Industrial Tribunal five months later. She was Chairwoman of the Ladies Joint Committee, a group set up in 1975 as a part of the Kennel Club hierarchy, but the committee was not allowed any input into general club decisions. Her actions against the club were fully supported by the other members of the Ladies Committee. Legal technicalities caused the tribunal to reject the case, but it recommended that the Equal Opportunities Commission should be approached as discrimination was clearly demonstrated. Nagle was determined and stated her intention to appeal against the decision. Leonard Pagliero was Chairman of the Kennel Club at the time, and before Nagle was able to complete the appeal he contacted the canine press, Dog World and Our Dogs, on 8 September 1978 announcing that the Club's General Committee was recommending that the club's constitution be changed to allow women members. The proposal was carried unanimously at a meeting held on 23 November 1978. The result was that Nagle and many other ladies were accepted as members of the Kennel Club at a formal meeting held on 10 April 1979. The total number of women approved for membership at the landmark meeting was 80; the costs of the campaign were funded by Nagle.

The Kennel Club saw more change under the chairmanship of John MacDougall during the period 1981 to 1996. Among the changes he helped introduce were the revamping of the club's constitution, the development of the Junior Organisation to encourage youth participation in the sport of dog showing, and the creation of the library and the charitable trust. It was also under his stewardship that the registration system became computerised.

The British royal family have been patrons of the club since it was founded. In 2023, on the 150th anniversary of the club's existence, King Charles III granted it the right to use the "royal" prefix in its name. The club officially "relaunched" under its current name, The Royal Kennel Club, in 2025.

== Crufts ==
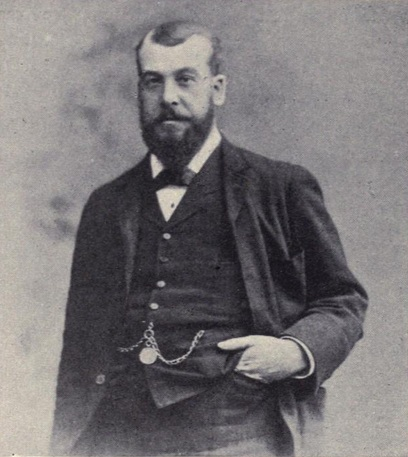
Charles Cruft, the founder of the Crufts dog show

The first successful annual all-breed dog show was produced by Charles Cruft in 1891. He produced the Crufts dog show for 45 years until his death in 1938. His widow, Emma, continued for four shows. She then sold it to the Kennel Club, as she felt unable to devote the time to running such a large undertaking and she wanted to perpetuate her husband's legacy. No shows were held during the Second World War. The first Crufts show held by the Kennel Club was in 1948 at Olympia, London. The show was first televised by the BBC in 1950. The 1954 edition was cancelled due to the strike of electricians.

The show moved to Earls Court in 1979, where it remained until staging its centenary show in 1991 at the National Exhibition Centre in Birmingham, where it still takes place. From originally being a show for the exhibition of purebred dogs, it has expanded over the years and now incorporates most other canine disciplines such as Obedience, Agility, and Flyball.

== Discover Dogs ==
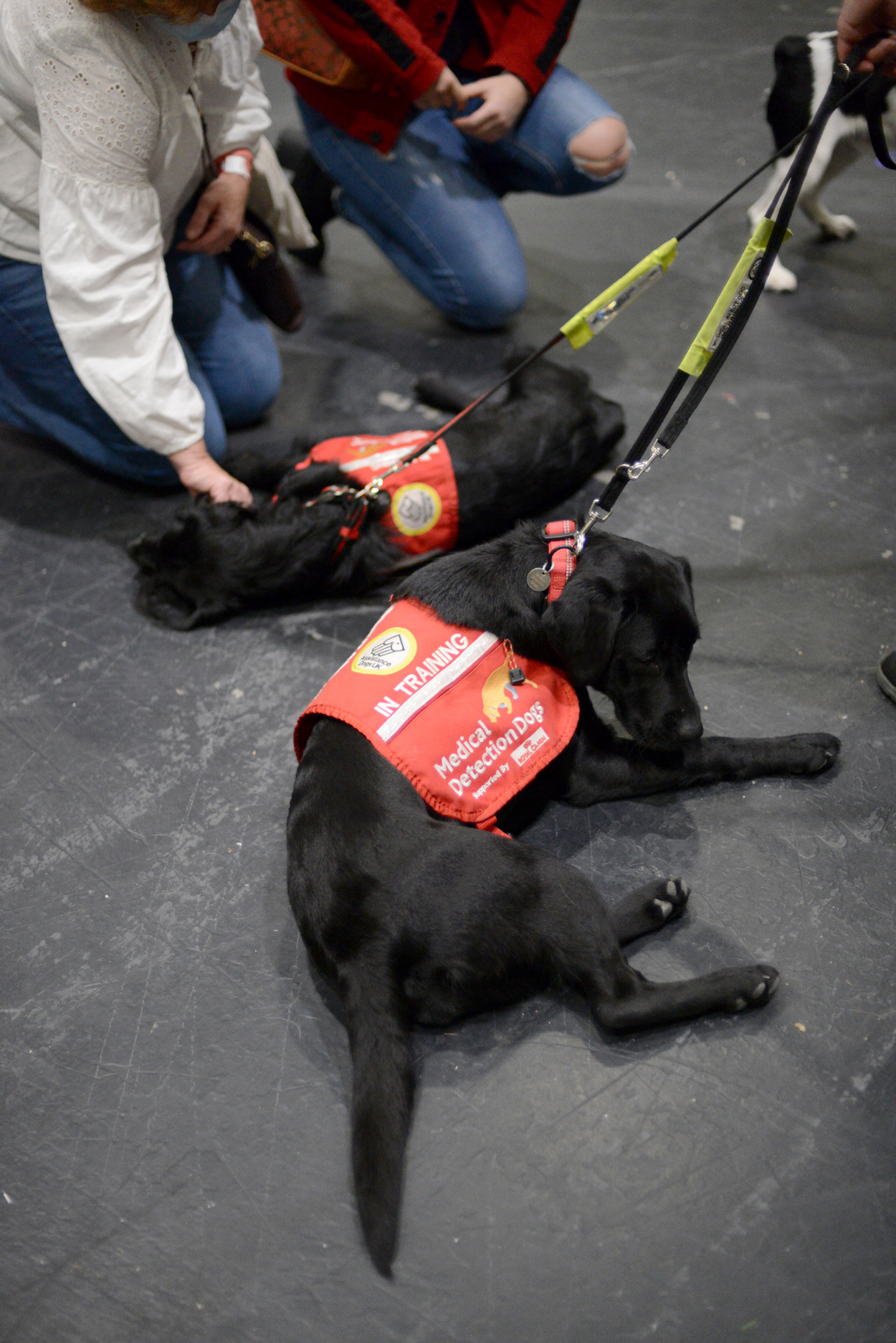
Medical Detection Dogs attend the 2021 Discover Dogs convention at London Excel Centre.

Initially the Discover Dogs event was staged as a part of Crufts dog show, but as its popularity increased it became a stand-alone event. Established in 1996, it gives the public an opportunity to meet representatives of all pedigree dog breeds and talk with breed experts about the suitability of the breed as a pet.

Until 2014, this two-day annual event was held at Earls Court Exhibition Centre in London in November. Since 2015, it has been held in October at the ExCeL Centre in East London.

The event includes the semi-finals for the Kennel Gazette Junior Warrant competition, a competition for pedigree dogs aged between six and 18 months, and the National Junior Handling UK final, as well as agility competitions and displays by police and other dog teams. There are also a large number of trade stalls. It is popular, with the 2012 event drawing a crowd of over 30,000.

From 2000 to 2012, Discover Dogs also hosted the finals of the Scruffts Family Crossbreed of the Year competition for mixed-breed dogs. Since 2013, this has been held in conjunction with the main Crufts show.

== Kennel Club Charitable Trust ==
The Kennel Club Charitable Trust is a dog charity that looks after the welfare and health of dogs. They fund a wide variety of work, including supporting research into canine diseases, dog welfare organisations and the promotion of service dogs. Set up in 1987, it was first registered with the Charity Commission in May 1988. The Duchess of Cornwall became the first patron of the Trust in October 2007 when it celebrated its twentieth anniversary.

The Royal Kennel Club makes many donations to charitable causes, with grants totalling over £10 million between the club's foundation and 2020. The Animal Health Trust (AHT) frequently received donations from the Kennel Club and, in 2012, a £1.5 million interest free loan was granted to the AHT to enable it to complete the building and equipping of a new animal cancer treatment and research centre at its base in Suffolk. The AHT also regularly received funding to enable work to continue at the Genetics Centre run in conjunction with the Kennel Club. The sum of £250,000 was donated to the Genetics Centre in 2010. During 2010, the Kennel Club Charitable Trust provided almost £800,000 to help non-pedigree as well as pedigree organisations.

The Kennel Club Charitable Trust also funded a new building at the National Agricultural Centre, Stoneleigh Park, Kenilworth, which was opened by Prince Michael of Kent in February 2009. The facilities are used for various canine related competitions, training, seminars and charity events.

== Royal Kennel Club Art Gallery ==
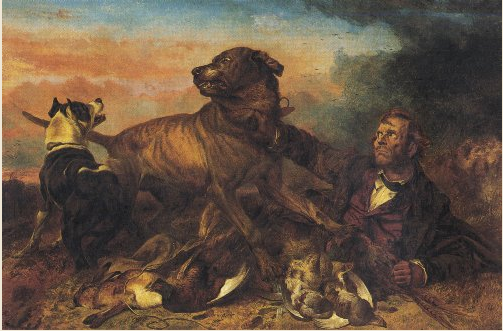
Richard Ansdell's 1865 painting, The Poacher at Bay

The Royal Kennel Club Art Gallery is located at the club's headquarters in Mayfair, London. The gallery is devoted to fine art about dogs and features themed exhibitions, as well as a permanent collection. Artists in the collection include Maud Earl, George Earl, Richard Ansdell, Arthur Wardle and Cecil Aldin. The gallery is open only by appointment.

The art gallery opened in 2003 and was the idea of former chairman John McDougall. The club had accumulated quite a large collection of canine artwork, including 130 oil paintings, 100 works on paper, nearly 100 engravings and prints, and the same number of sculptures and trophies.

Various exhibitions are held covering a variety of breeds, such as English Setters, Gordon Setters, and Irish Setters. To promote the collection available at the art gallery, it sometimes stages exhibitions at art and design fairs. Former chairman Ronnie Irving is quoted as saying "The great thing about the Kennel Club Art Gallery is that it's a way of encouraging those people interested in dogs to learn a bit more about art and those people interested in art to do likewise about dogs."

== Assured Breeder scheme ==
The Accredited Breeder Scheme was launched in 2004 but was later renamed as the Assured Breeder scheme (ABS). As the ABS membership grew, a number of regional advisors were recruited to inspect breeders' premises and paperwork to ensure adequate standards were being met. Breed specific recommendations were added to some breeds for the first time in January 2010 after consultations with breed clubs.

The scheme was meant to help potential dog owners identify responsible breeders, but has been described by the Dogs Trust as "full of pitfalls, the main one being that it's self-certificating". The Associate Parliamentary Group for Animal Welfare report indicated that the low breeding standards practiced by some in the ABS may allow the public to be "falsely led into thinking a puppy they buy from an accredited breeder registered with [the club] will have no health or welfare problems associated with its breeding history." It called for more random checks and robust enforcement of the scheme and states that "the use of the word ‘pedigree’ should be tied to a high standard of breeding (for health and welfare) across the board with [the club] not just with the few that decide to join the Accredited Breeder Scheme (ABS)."

The Inquiry believes that ultimately The Kennel Club can win back trust by showing that they are willing to take responsibility for dogs registered with them and that they are willing to lose members who do not meet high standards.

The report warned that if the health measures implemented by the club fail, government regulations might be necessary. The club issued a response to the report. Pedigree Dogs Exposed producer Jemima Harrison condemned the club's response, stating that they are downplaying the criticism of the club in the report and misrepresenting the findings.

In April 2013, it was announced that the ABS scheme had secured recognition by the United Kingdom Accreditation Service (UKAS). Various changes were made to the scheme to gain accreditation, which included ensuring inspections were made of all new members' premises and that those who were already members would be checked within a three-year time period. In January 2010, Prof. Sir Patrick Bateson had advocated seeking UKAS accreditation in his Independent Inquiry into Dog Breeding.

In 2024, the club announced that the Assured Breeders Scheme (ABS) would close by the end of the year.

== Other programmes ==
In February 2013, the club launched a programme called "Get Fit With Fido", which encouraged dog owners to lose weight by exercising with their dogs.

== Pedigree Dogs Exposed ==
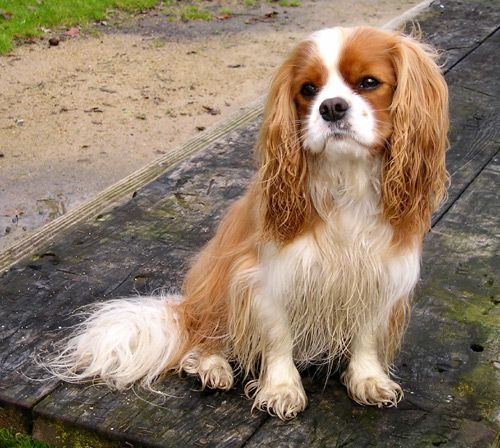
A Cavalier King Charles Spaniel, one of the dog breeds featured in Pedigree Dogs Exposed

The organisation was criticised in an August 2008 BBC programme Pedigree Dogs Exposed for allowing breed standards, judging standards and breeding practices which are said to compromise the health of purebred dogs. The programme led various sponsors to withdraw their participation in Crufts and the BBC eventually dropped Crufts 2009 from its coverage. The club initially defended their practices, and criticised the programme as "highly biased". It also lodged a complaint to regulatory authority Ofcom. Ofcom rejected the club's claim of unfair editing and deceit, but found that the BBC did not give the club "a proper opportunity to respond" to allegations that the club was "eugenicist" and (per Ofcom's characterisation of the programme's allegations) that it "shared a common ideology with Nazi racial theory", nor to an allegation that it covered up the nature of an operation carried out on a Crufts Best in Show winner.

Due to the strong public response, the club started rolling out new health plans. Breed standards for every breed went under review and show judges would be required to choose only healthy dogs. New breed standards were announced in January 2009 and close inbreeding was banned.
