= The Power of the Dog =

"The Power of the Dog" is a quote from Psalm 22 of the Book of Psalms.

The Power of the Dog may also refer to:

- The Power of the Dog, 1910–11 dog breed guide by Arthur Croxton Smith and illustrated by Maud Earl
- The Power of the Dog (Savage novel), 1967 novel by Thomas Savage
  - The Power of the Dog (film), 2021 film adaptation of Savage's novel
- The Power of the Dog (Winslow novel), 2005 novel by Don Winslow
