= Scruffts =

Informal UK cross breeds dog show

Scruffts is an informal national dog show competition, where crossbreed dogs of any parentage are allowed to compete. Launched in 2000, it is hosted by The Kennel Club of the United Kingdom and is named after Crufts, its world-famous annual show for pedigrees.

At Scruffts, dogs compete for the titles of:

- "Most Handsome dog": For dogs aged 6 months to 7 years
- "Prettiest bitch": For bitches aged 6 months to 7 years
- "Child's best friend": For dogs or bitches aged 6 months to 12 years, handled by a child aged 6 to 16 years
- "Golden Oldie": For dogs or bitches aged 8 to 12 years

Scruffts was designed for people or families who do not have a purebred dog and who want to experience conformation competition with their dogs. It is an opportunity to properly socialise dogs and further strengthen the bond between dog and owner, as well as to help people meet others with a similar interest in dogs. Just as crossbreeds are not allowed to enter true conformation shows, purebred dogs are not eligible for Scruffts, regardless of whether they are registered with The Kennel Club. Judges cannot refer to a breed standard and therefore dogs are judged only on "Good Character", "Good Health", and "Good temperament with both people and dogs". According to Ricky Tomlinson, a past judge, one year the competition was won by a three-legged dog.

The entry fee for Scruffts is only £2, and all money raised goes to the Kennel Club Charitable Trust. Every year heats are held around the country with Rosettes awarded to the 1st, 2nd, and 3rd positions in each class. Each dog or bitch that receives a 1st placement is eligible to compete in the final. Until 2012 this was held at the Discover Dogs show in November at Earls Court Exhibition Centre in London. Since 2013 the final has been held in conjunction with the main Crufts show at the National Exhibition Centre, Birmingham.

A Scruffts dog show for mixed breeds has also been held in the Algarve region of Portugal, organised by the Association for Protection of Animals in the Algarve.
