= Field Dog Stud Book =

Dog registry in the United States

The Field Dog Stud Book is the oldest purebred dog registry in the United States having started registrations in and currently maintaining records from 1874. The Field Dog Stud Book currently registers around 5,000 litters each year and has registered several million dogs. In addition to registration the FDSB maintains the results of DNA testing of dogs to promote genetic health.

== Overview ==
The Field Dog Stud Book focuses on dogs bred to perform in the field. It supports no conformation showing. This stud book is affiliated with the field trial magazine The American Field which is the oldest continuously published sporting dog journal in the U.S.

The FDSB registers dogs of all breeds, but is primarily for pointing, flushing, and retrieving breeds of gun dog. Among some breeds, such as English Setters, the FDSB will register the dog in its particular breed as well as the particular line within the breed such as the Llewellin Setter.

Hunters and field trial enthusiasts prefer the FDSB to the AKC but several breeds have dual registrations.

Irish Setters used to be cross-registered with the American Kennel Club, but reciprocal registration was ended in 1975 when FDSB dogs were winning over AKC dogs in AKC's own field trial competitions. The breeds have further diverged and FDSB dogs are smaller and calmer than their AKC cousins with more colors accepted.

== See also ==
- American Dog Breeders Association
- American Rare Breed Association
