= Irish Setter =

Large red dog breed for finding and pointing gamebirds

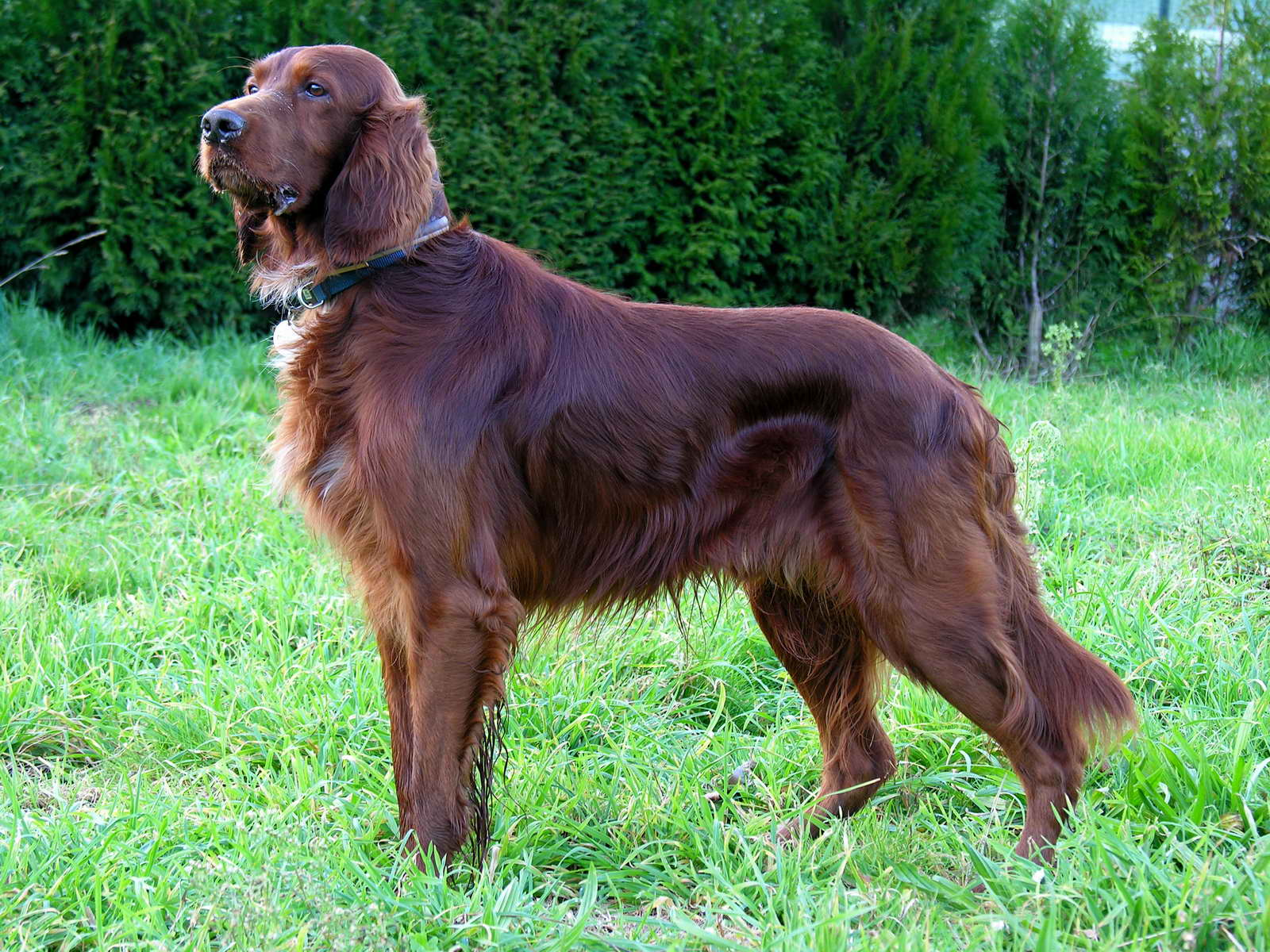
- Irish Setter
- Other names: Red Setter (Irish: sotar rua); Irish Red Setter
- Origin: Ireland
Kennel club standards
- Irish Kennel Club: standard
- Fédération Cynologique Internationale: standard

The Irish Setter (Irish: sotar rua, literally 'red setter') is a setter, a breed of gundog, and family dog originating in Ireland. The term Irish Setter is commonly used to encompass the show-bred dog recognised by the American Kennel Club as well as the field-bred Red Setter recognised by the Field Dog Stud Book. The breed is known for having a friendly and gentle temperament.

== Description ==
=== Appearance ===
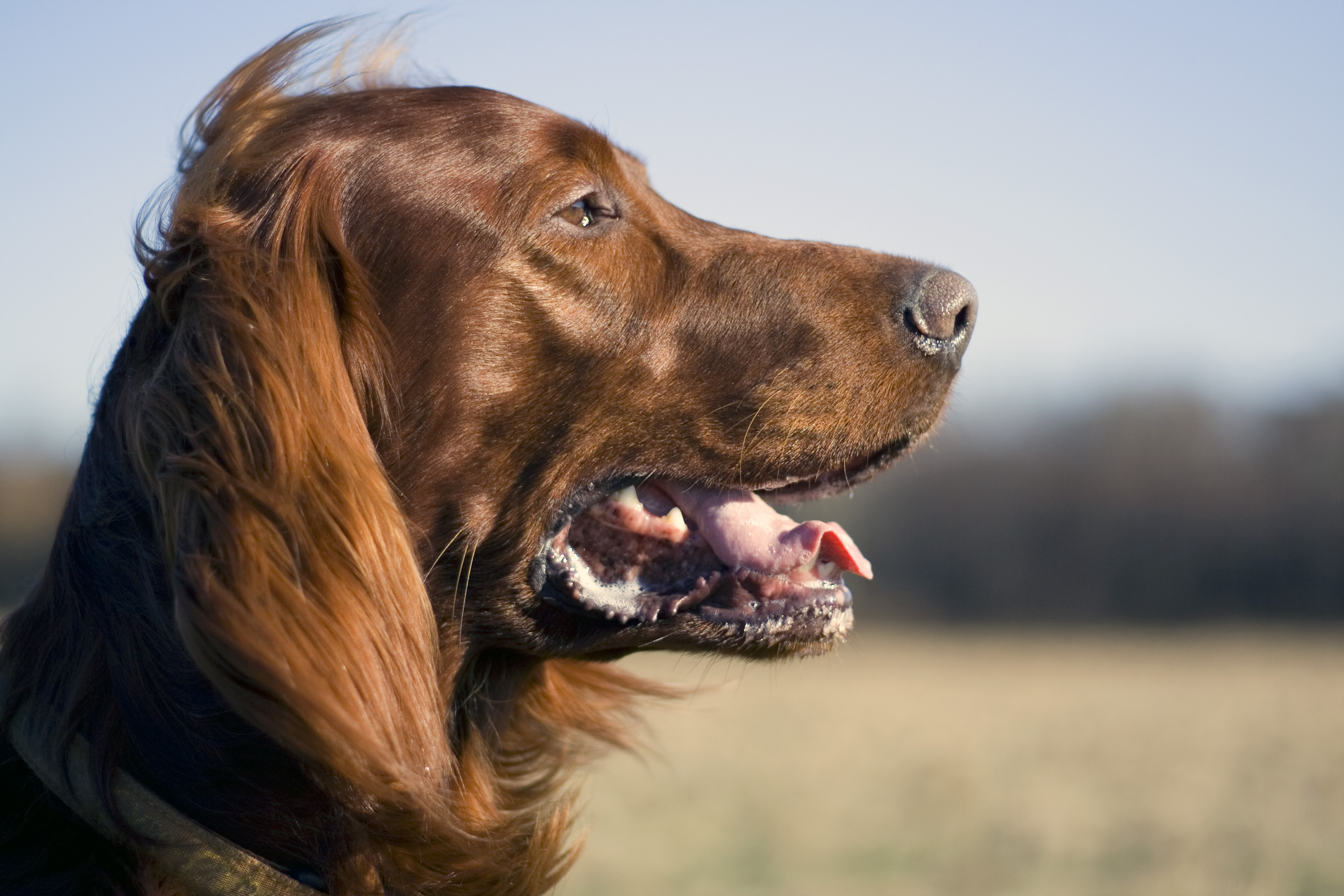
Irish Setter in profile

The coat is moderately long, silky, and of a red or chestnut colour. It requires frequent brushing to maintain its condition and keep it mat-free. The undercoat is abundant in winter weather, and the top coat is fine. Their coats should also feather in places such as the tail, ears, chest, legs, and body. Irish Setters range in height from 24 to 28 inches (61 to 71 cm), males weigh 65 to 75 lb (29 to 34 kg) and females 55 to 65 lb (25 to 29 kg). The FCI Breed Standard for the Irish Setter stipulates males stand 23 to 26.5 inches (58 to 67 cm) tall, and females be 21.5 to 24.5 inches (55 to 62 cm) tall. Irish Setters are deep chested dogs with small waists. An Irish Setter's life expectancy tends to be around 11 to 12 years.

=== Temperament ===
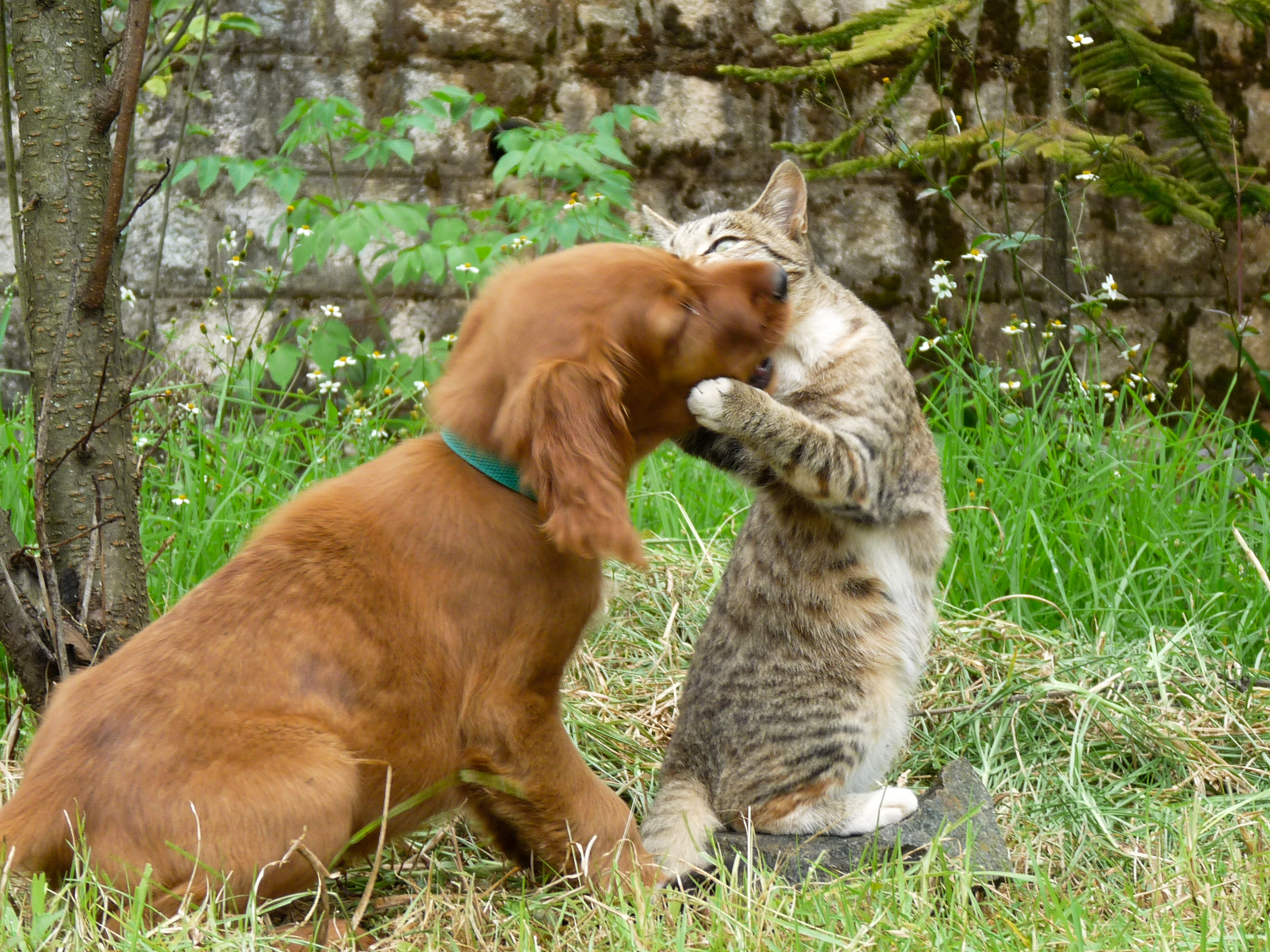
9-week old puppy playing with cat

The UK standards state that the breed should be "demonstrably affectionate", while the American Kennel Club standard states the setter has a "rollicking personality", full of humor and character and always down for fun. Being shy is not a part of its temperament.

== History ==
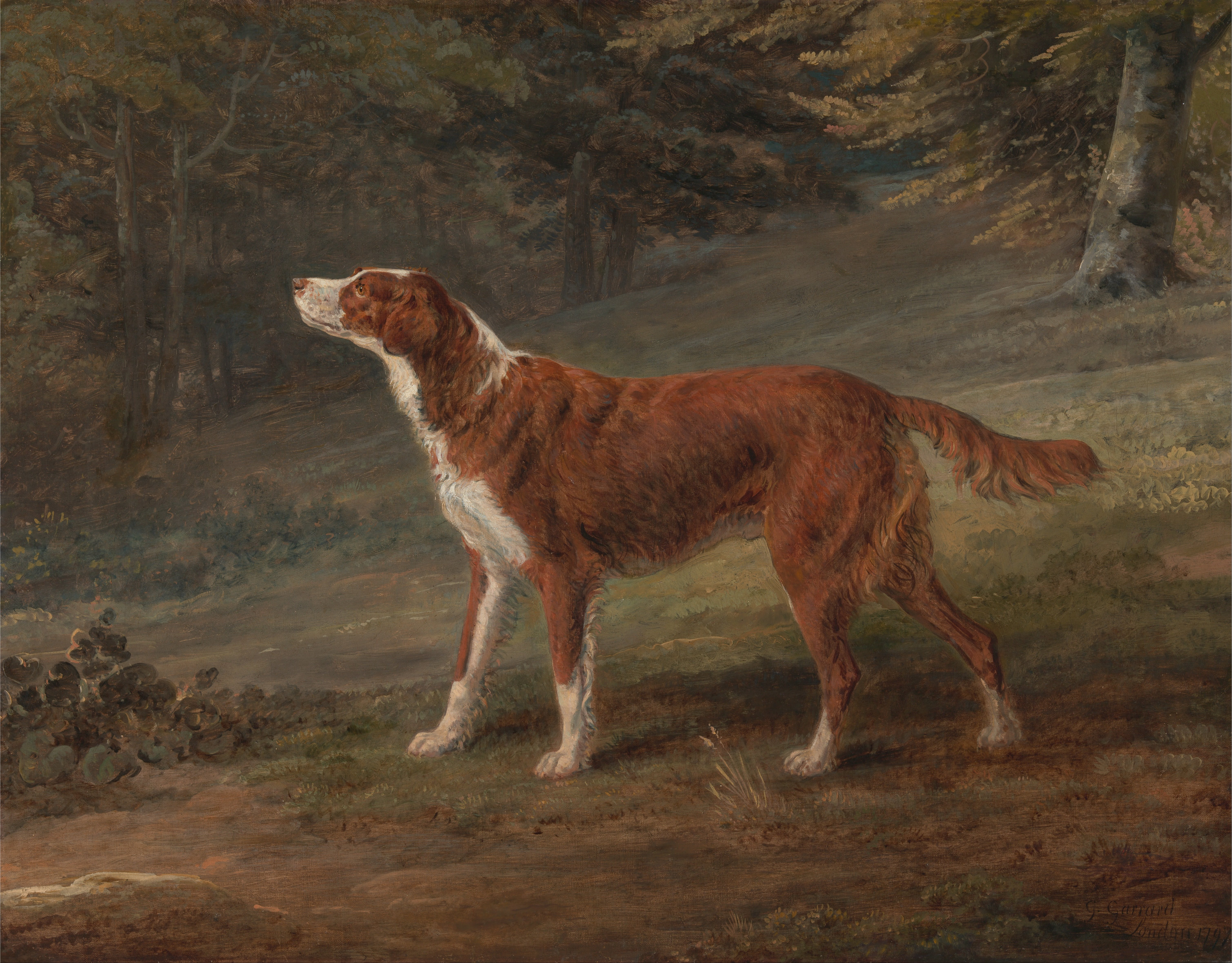
The Irish Setter, in the beginning, was not identical to the breed today. The solid red colouring came about by selective breeding practices. Ranger, a Red Setter, the property of Elizabeth Gray in 1797.

One of the first references to the 'Setter,' or setting dog, in literature can be found in Caius's De Canibus Britannicis, which was published in 1570 (with a revised version published in 1576). Translated from the original Latin, the text reads:

The Dogge called the Setter, in Latine, Index: Another sort of Dogges be there, serviceable for fowling, making no noise either with foote or with tongue, whiles they follow the game. They attend diligently upon their Master and frame their condition to such beckes, motions and gestures, as it shall please him to exhibite and make, either going forward, drawing backeward, inclinding to the right hand, or yealding toward the left. When he hath founde the byrde, he keepeth sure and fast silence, he stayeth his steppes and will proceed no further, and weth a close, covert watching eye, layeth his belly to the grounde and so creepth forward like a worme. When he approaches neere to the place where the byrde is, he layes him downe, and with a marcke of his pawes, betrayeth the place of the byrdes last abode, whereby it is supposed that this kind of dogge is calles in Index, Setter, being in deede a name most consonant and agreeable to his quality."

It would be incorrect to assume the dog described above in any way resembles the Irish Setter (or any setter) as we know the breed today. Caius was referring to a type of setting spaniel, most likely now extinct. The description of the work undertaken by this early pillar of the breed resembles the working behaviour of modern Irish Setters. Of this early dog, Caius went on to write: "The most part of theyre skinnes are white, and if they are marcked with any spottes, they are commonly red, and somewhat great therewithall." If this is the case, it is safe to assume the solid red colouring of today's Irish Setter came about by selective breeding practices.

Further reference to setters in early literature can be found in The Country Farme by Richard Surflet and Gervase Markham, published in 1616. They wrote: "There is also another sort of land spannyels which are called Setters."

It is clear that, by the early 18th Century, the type of dog known as the 'setter' had come into its own right. It is also clear the Irish had begun actively breeding their own type. For example, the de Freyne family of French Park began keeping detailed stud records in 1793. Other prominent landed Irish gentry also known to have been breeding setter lines at the same time include Lord Clancarty, Lord Dillon, and the Marquis of Waterford.

It was noted as early as 1845 that setters in Ireland were predominantly either red, or, according to Youatt, "...very red, or red and white, or lemon coloured, or white patched with deep chestnut." Clearly, the preference for a solid red-coloured dog was having an effect on the appearance of the typical Irish-bred setter.

The breed standard for the modern Irish Setter was first drawn up by the Irish Red Setter Club in Dublin and approved on 29 March 1886. It consisted of a 100-point scale, with a given number of points awarded for each of the dog's physical attributes. The points system was later dropped; however, aside from some minor changes, the standard remains largely unchanged today in most countries where the breed is formally recognised.

History

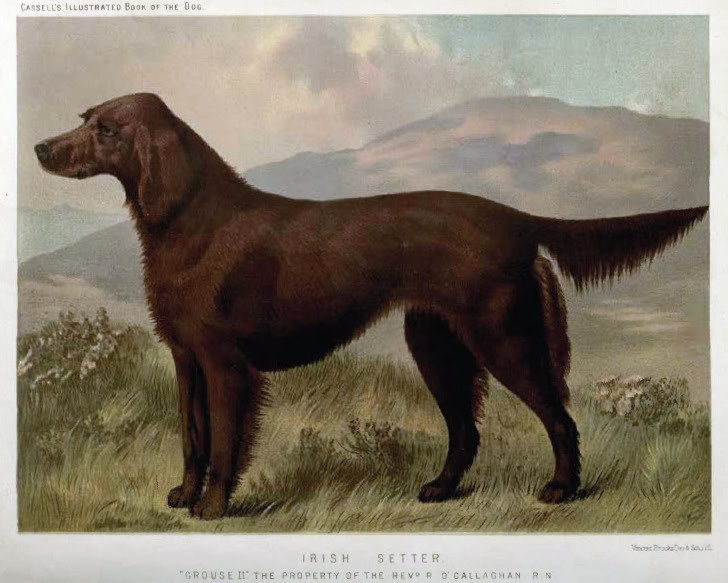
Irish Setter, 1881

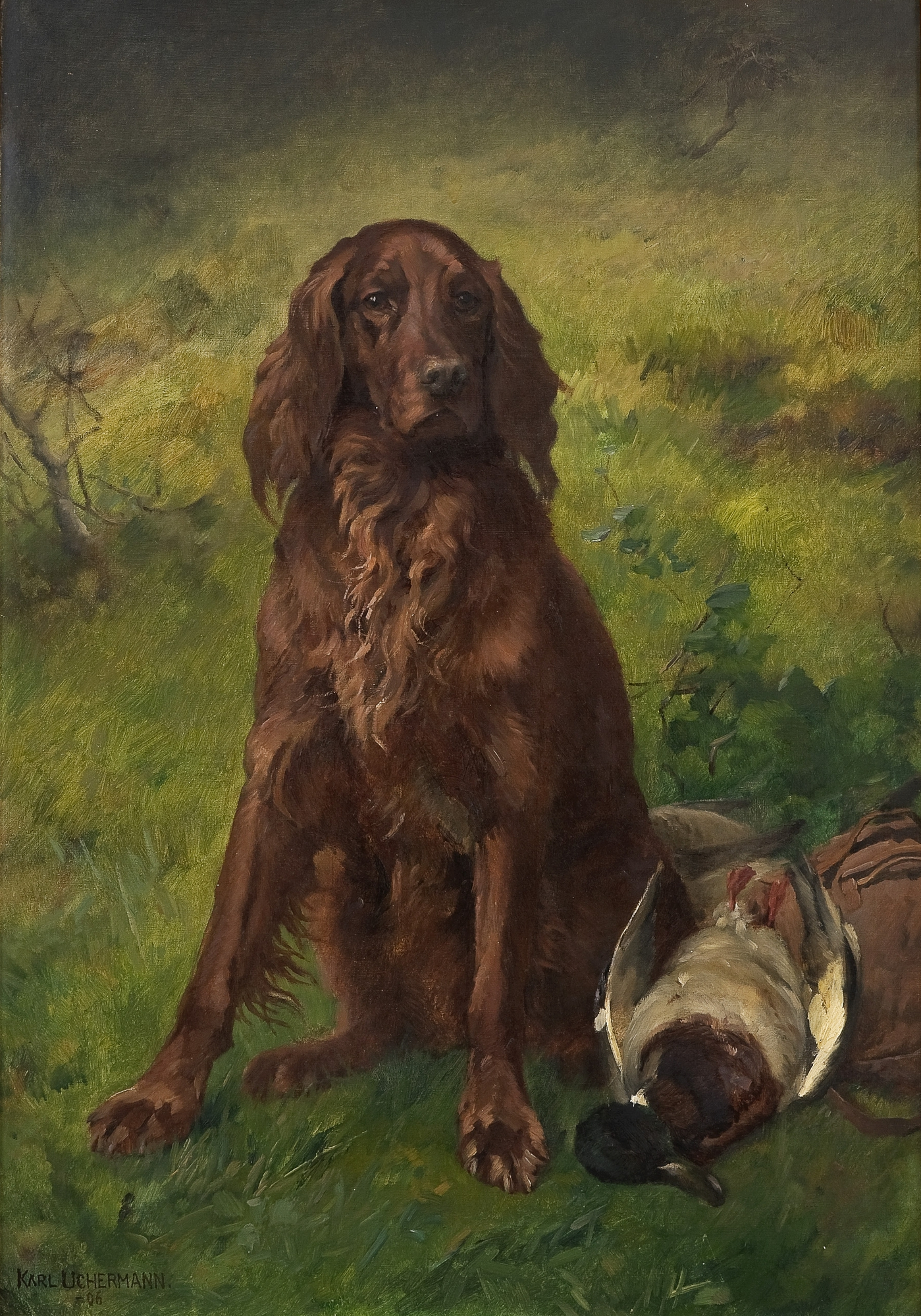
Irish Setter with a duck, 1855

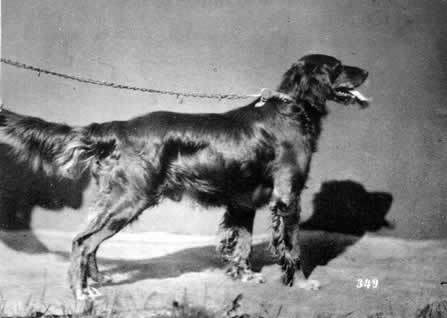
Irish Setter in 1879

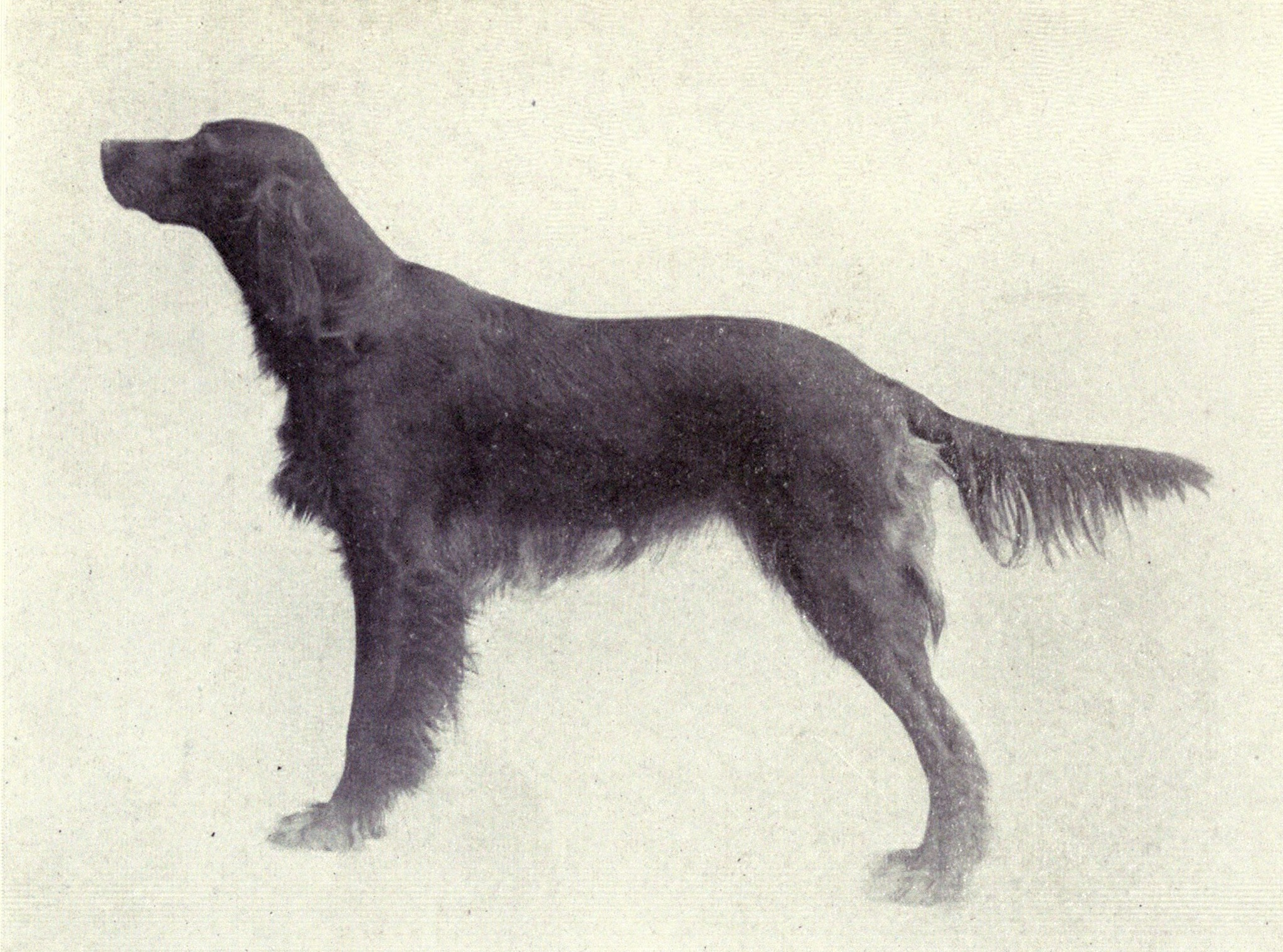
Irish Setter circa 1915

== Uses ==
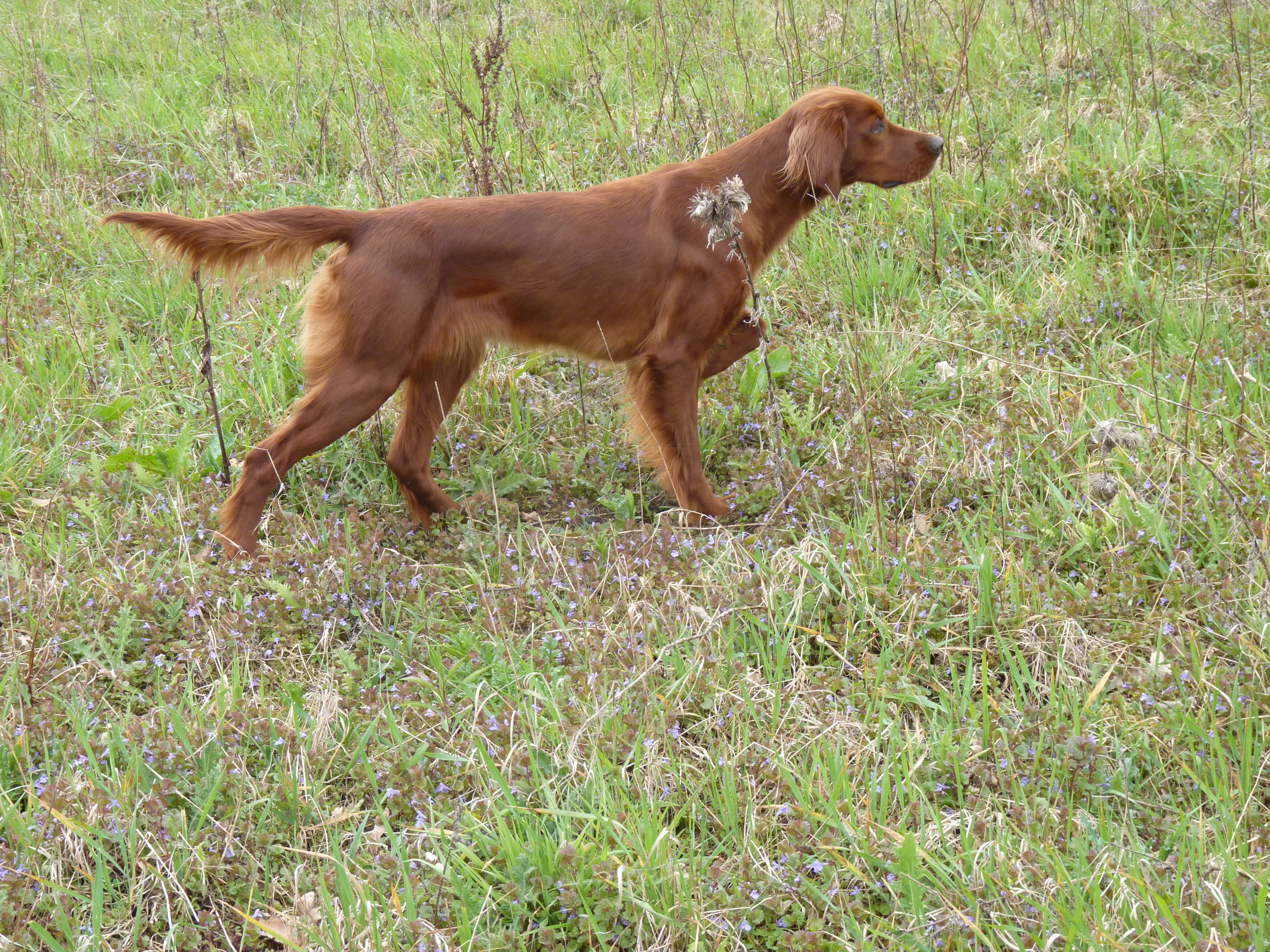
Irish Setter pointing

The Irish Setter was bred for hunting, specifically for setting or locating and pointing upland gamebirds. They are suited for hunting in fields and wet or dry moorland terrain. Using their sense of smell to locate the mark (or bird), the Irish Setter will then hold a pointing position, indicating the direction in which the bird lies hidden.

The Irish Setter was brought to the United States in the early 19th century.

In 1874, the American Field put together the Field Dog Stud Book and registry of dogs in the United States was born. This Field Dog Stud Book is the oldest pure-bred registry in the United States. At that time, dogs could be registered even when bred from sires and dams of different breeds. At about this time, the Llewellin Setter was bred using blood lines from the Lavarack breeding of English Setter and, among other breeds, bloodlines from native Irish Setters. Around the same time, the red Irish Setter became a favourite in the dog show ring.

Not all Irish Setters of the late 19th century were red, the American Kennel Club registered Irish Setters in myriad colours. Frank Forester, a 19th-century sports writer, described the Irish Setter as follows: "The points of the Irish Setter are more bony, angular, and wiry frame, a longer head, a less silky and straighter coat that those of the English. His colour ought to be a deep orange-red and white, a common mark is a stripe of white between the eyes and a white ring around the neck, white stockings, and a white tage to the tail."

The Setter that was completely red, however, was preferred in the show ring and that is the direction that the breed took. Between 1874 and 1948, the breed produced 760 conformation show champions, but only five field champions.

In the 1940s, Field and Stream magazine put into writing what was already a well-known fact. The Irish Setter was disappearing from the field and an outcross would be necessary to resurrect the breed as a working dog. Sports Afield chimed in with a similar call for an outcross. Ned LaGrande of Pennsylvania spent a small fortune purchasing examples of the last of the working Irish Setters in America and importing dogs from overseas. With the blessing of the Field Dog Stud Book, he began an outcross to red and white field champion English Setters. The National Red Setter Field Trial Club was created to test the dogs and to encourage breeding toward a dog that would successfully compete with the white setters. Thus the modern Red Setter was born and the controversy begun.

Prior to 1975, a relationship existed between the American Kennel Club and the Field Dog Stud Book in which registration with one body qualified a dog for registration with the other. In 1975 the Irish Setter Club of America petitioned the American Kennel Club to deny reciprocal registration, and the request was granted. It is claimed, by critics of the move, that the pressure was placed on the American Kennel Club by bench show enthusiasts who were unappreciative of the outcrossing efforts of the National Red Setter Field Trial Club, as well as some field trialers from the American Kennel Club after a series of losses to Field Dog Stud book red setters. Working Irish Setter kennels today field champion dogs that claim lines from both the Field Dog Stud Book and the American Kennel Club.

Irish Setter

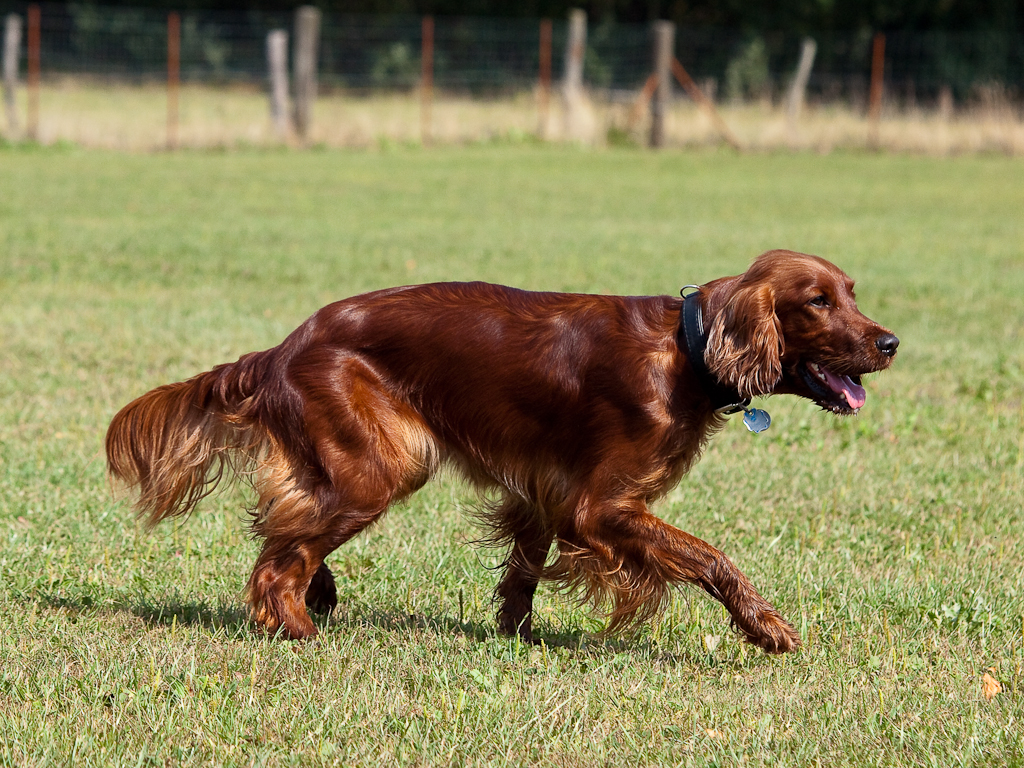
The Irish Setter was bred for hunting.

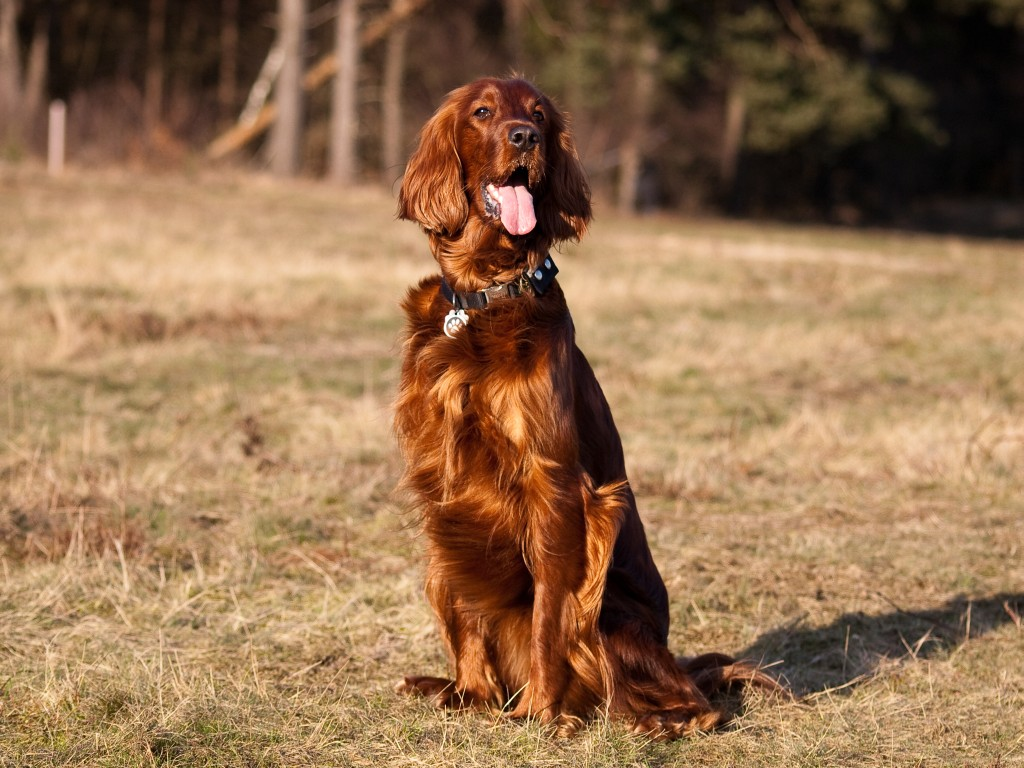
Irish Setter

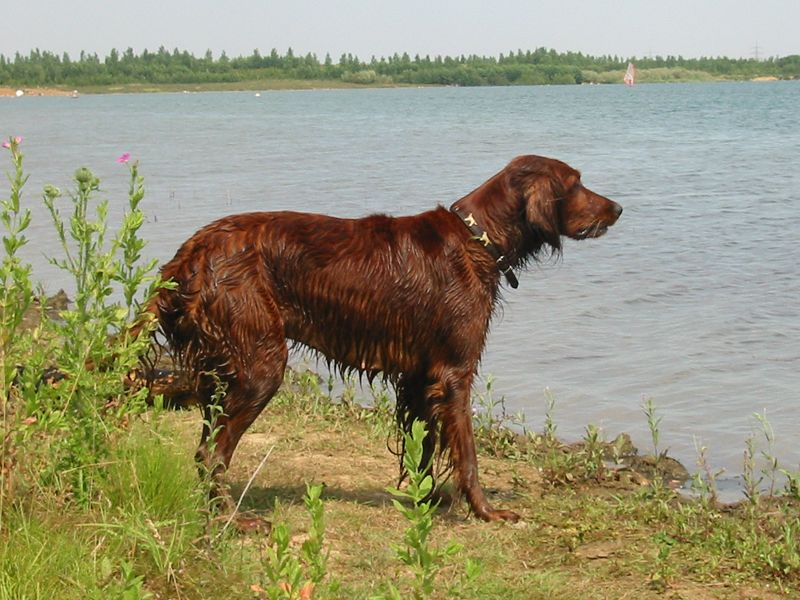
An Irish Setter after swimming

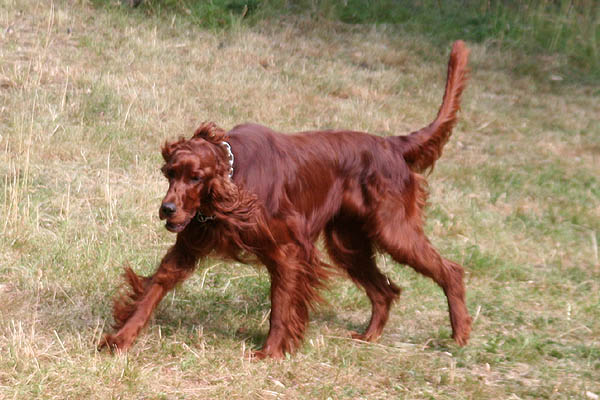
Irish Setter running in the fields

=== Working Red Setter ===
The modern Red Setter is smaller than its bench-bred cousin. While show dogs often reach 70 lb (32 kg), the Working Red Setter is generally around 45 lb (20 kg). The coat is less silky and the feathering is generally shorter. The colour is lighter, with the working dog found in russet and fawn colours. The Red Setter often has patches of white on its face and chest as the Irish Setter of old did. There have been efforts to rekindle the field abilities of the true type Irish by a handful of dedicated breeders in California and elsewhere with some success.

== Health ==
A 2024 UK study found a life expectancy of 12.9 years for the breed compared to an average of 12.7 for all purebreeds and 12 for crossbreeds.

Gluten intolerance in Irish Setters is a naturally occurring genetic disorder that is the result of a single autosomal recessive locus. At around 6 months of age, Irish Setters with this condition will develop an increased immune cell presence and a decrease in absorption within the small intestine when fed a gluten containing diet. These effects lead to further damage of the small intestine as well as malnutrition and diarrhea. Irish Setters that are fed a gluten free diet have been shown to be exempt from any effects associated with gluten intolerance.

The breed is predisposed to atopic dermatitis.

Irish Setters are predisposed to gastric dilatation volvulus (GDV), colloquially known as bloat. This condition is associated with deep-chested dogs like the Irish Setter.

== Notable setters ==
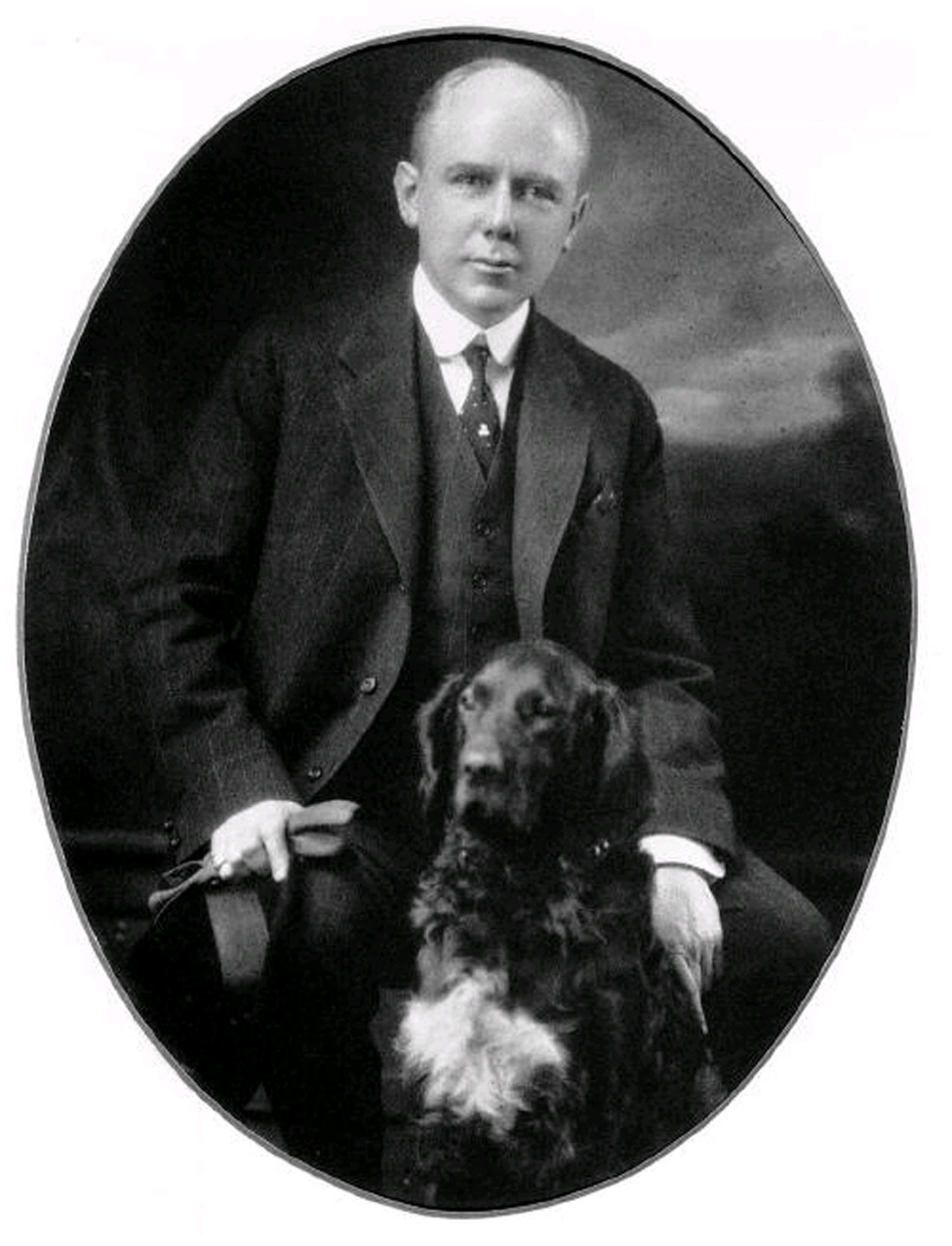
Garry Owen with Maine Governor Baxter

- King Timahoe (1968–1979), pet of Richard Nixon, a 56th birthday gift from his White House staff in January 1969
- Plunkett, the only Irish setter depicted in George Earl's mythical painting A Field Trial in the Eighties
- Milford, owned by Emperor Alexander II of Russia

== See also ==
- List of dog breeds
