= George Earl (painter) =

English painter

- Born: 1828; Cheltenham, Gloucestershire, England
- Died: 1908 (aged 79–80); Epsom, Surrey, England
- Known for: Painting
- Notable work: "The Field Trial Meeting"

George Earl (1824–1908) was a painter, primarily of sporting dogs and other animals. He was also the father of Maud Earl and Percy Earl, and the brother of Thomas Earl, all three of whom were also animal artists.

Earl was a keen sportsman and this is reflected in his work and reputation as a dog painter. He was also an early member of The Kennel Club. Although chiefly remembered as a canine artist due to his success depicting them, of the nineteen paintings Earl exhibited at the Royal Academy (RA) between 1857 and 1883 only a minority was of dogs.

== Notable works ==
- The Field Trial Meeting - A depiction of a mythical field trial set in Bala, North Wales. Earl included many of the famous dog trial faces of the day along with their animals. One such animal was 'Plunkett', the only Irish Setter depicted.
- Going North and Coming South - Two pictures commissioned by Sir Andrew Barclay Walker of the Walker Brewery, the paintings are bustling narrative works depicting railway station life. Now owned by the National Railway Museum they were rescued in 1990 from a Liverpool pub previously owned by the Walker Brewery (The Vines in Lime Street). Going North (signed and dated 1893) tells the story of a group of friends travelling from Kings Cross to Scotland for the summer grouse shooting season. The partner work Coming South (signed and dated 1895)) shows the group a month later at Perth Station, about to make their return journey. The works show much of the minutiae of Victorian station life and also include Earl's trademark sporting interests in the form of dogs and grouse. Earlier versions of the two paintings had been displayed at the RA in the 1870s.
- The Carlisle Otter Hounds, Striking the Foil - a huge and magnificent work of 20 dogs, including Bugleman, a famous hound in his days, and the entire Carlisle hunt in pursuit. It took George Earl 1 1/2 years to complete the work. It was purchased by Mr. Hermanus Koekkoek, a well known artist in his own right, who displayed the painting at his Gallery on Piccadily, London where he charged a shilling to view the work.
- Champions of England - A series of portrait studies of dogs heads painted in the 1870s, the works were illustrated in a book of the same name.
