= Maud Earl =

British-American artist

Maud Alice Earl
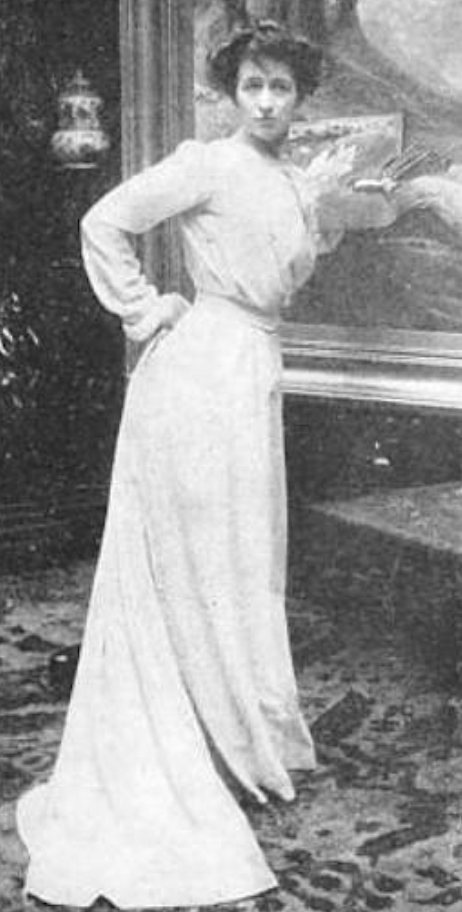
- Earl, from a 1904 publication
- Born: 1863; Marylebone, London
- Died: 1943 (aged 79–80); New York
- Education: Royal Female School of Art
- Movement: Royal Academy

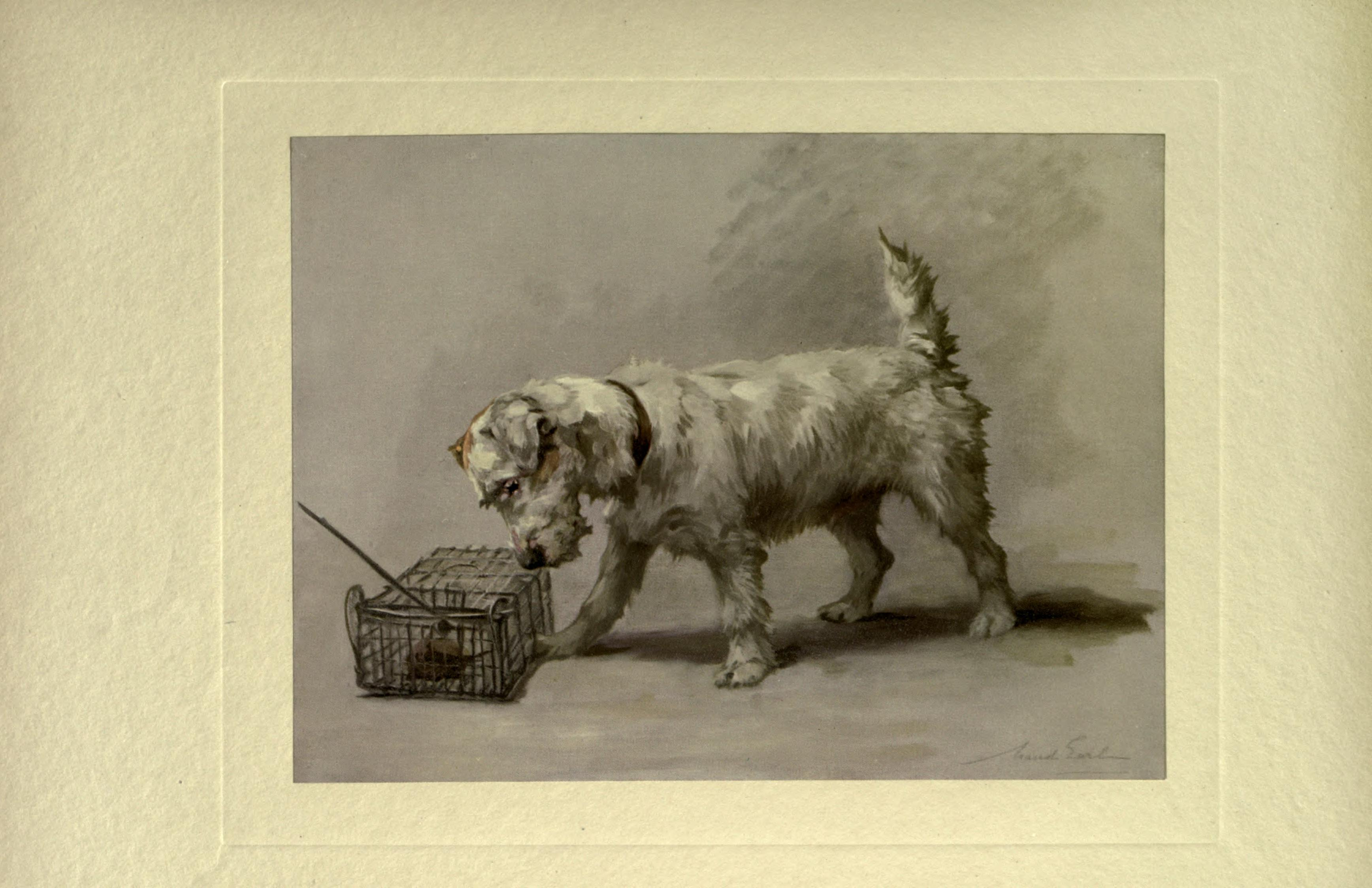
Plate VIII The Sealyham Terrier. Sealyham Terrier "Peer Gynt." Owned by Mr. Harry Jones. From The Power of the Dog, by A. Croxton Smith, 1910-1911, Holder and Stoughton, London. BHL

Maud Alice Earl (1863–1943) was a British-American artist, known for her canine paintings. Her works are much enjoyed by dog enthusiasts and also accurately record many breeds.

== Biography ==
Alice Maud Earl was born in Marylebone, London, to George Earl and Alice Beaumont Rawlins. Maud's profession was the continuation of a family tradition. Her father George, her uncle Thomas Earl and her half brother Percy Earl were also animal painters of note. George Earl, an avid sportsman and noted sporting painter, was his daughter’s first teacher and ensured she studied the anatomy of her subjects, drawing dog, horse and human skeletons to improve her skill. She later said that her father’s instruction had given her ability that set her apart from other dog painters. After her father's tutelage Maud went on to study at Royal Female School of Art, which was later incorporated into the Central School of Art.

Starting in 1884, Earl exhibited around twelve works at the Royal Academy starting with a stag painting Early Morning in 1884. She also exhibited at the Royal Society of British Artists and at the Paris Salon. In 1897 Earl had an exhibition in which she showed paintings of 48 different breeds of dog.

Earl became famous during the Victorian Era, a time when women were not expected to make their living at painting. Nevertheless, she developed a select clientele, that included members of the British royal family, such as Queen Victoria and Queen Alexandra. Although evidently extremely successful in England, Earl felt that the world she knew had been destroyed by World War I and she emigrated to New York City in 1916. By this time her work had received wide international recognition and her popular images were published in a number of books and in print form. The Sportsman's Year featured twelve of Earl's works as engravings. Earl died in New York in 1943 and is buried at Sleepy Hollow Cemetery in Sleepy Hollow, New York.

== Artistic style ==
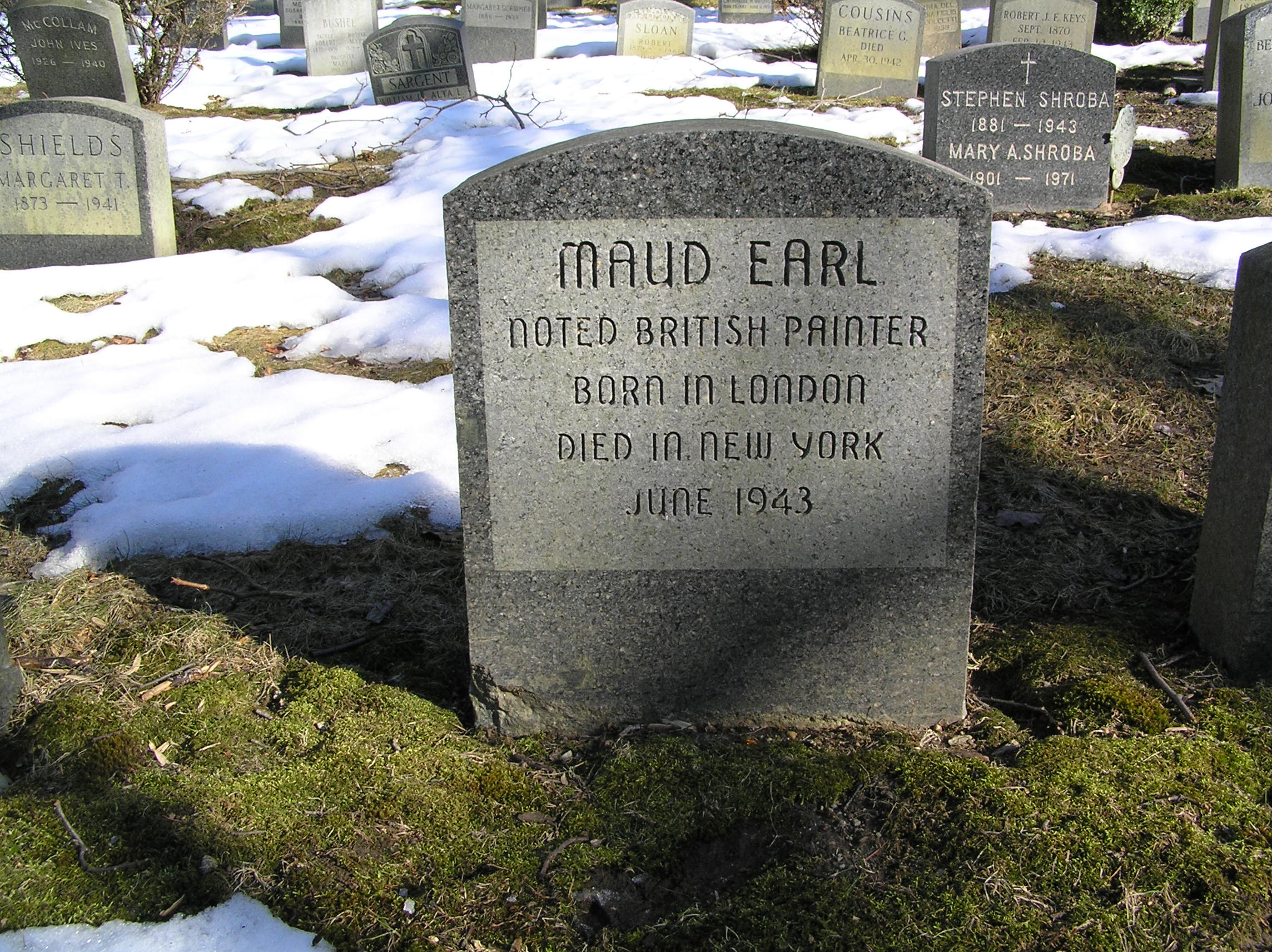
The gravesite of Maud Earl.

Maud Earl's career can be said to have developed through four styles. Her earlier dog portraits, painted between 1880 and 1900, display a rich, naturalistic style. Between 1900 and 1915 these portraits took on a sketchier, looser style, although still highly finished. Earl entered what she called her oriental style during her first few years in the United States. During this time she painted delicate pictures of birds and she believed these to be some of her best works. Finally, she painted stylized dog portraits during the 1930s.

== Notable works ==
- Caesar - Earl painted Edward VII's Fox Terrier Caesar on two occasions. The second depicted the dog mourning his master's death.
- The Power of the Dog

== Gallery ==
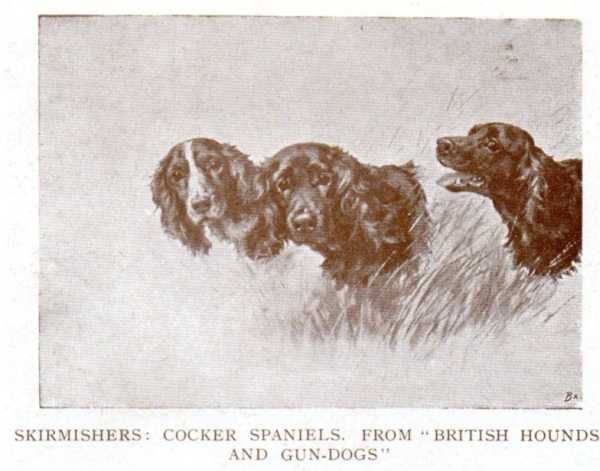

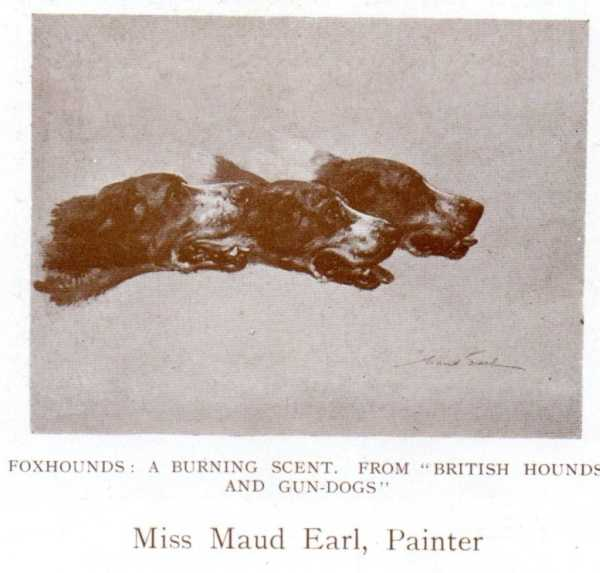

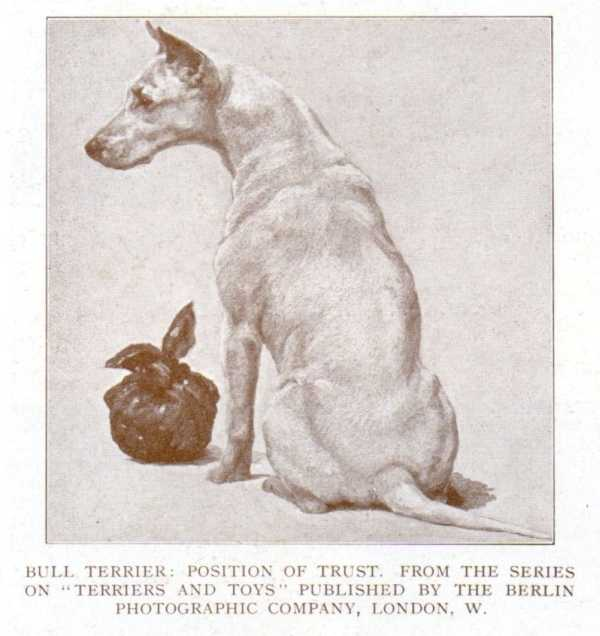

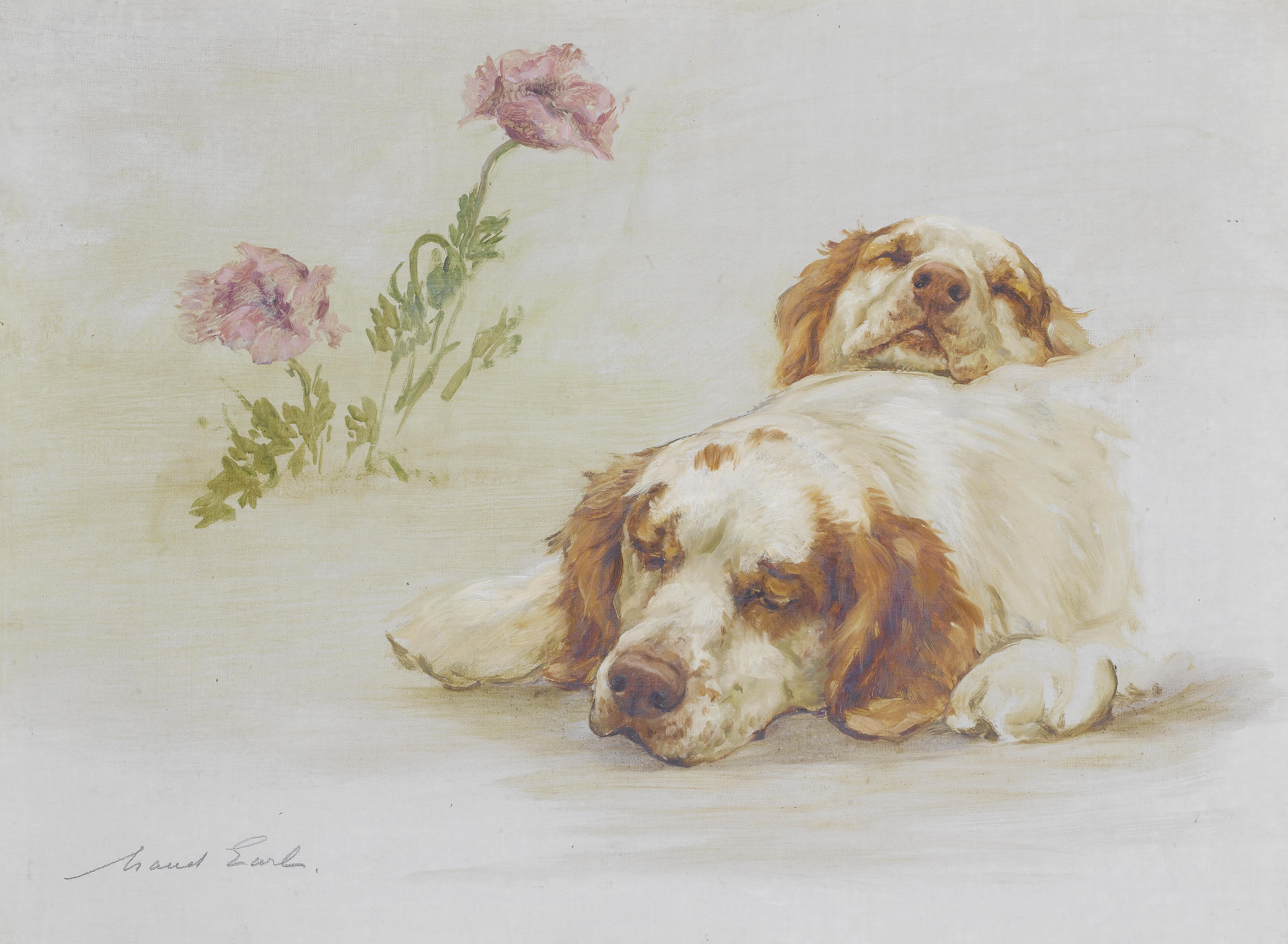

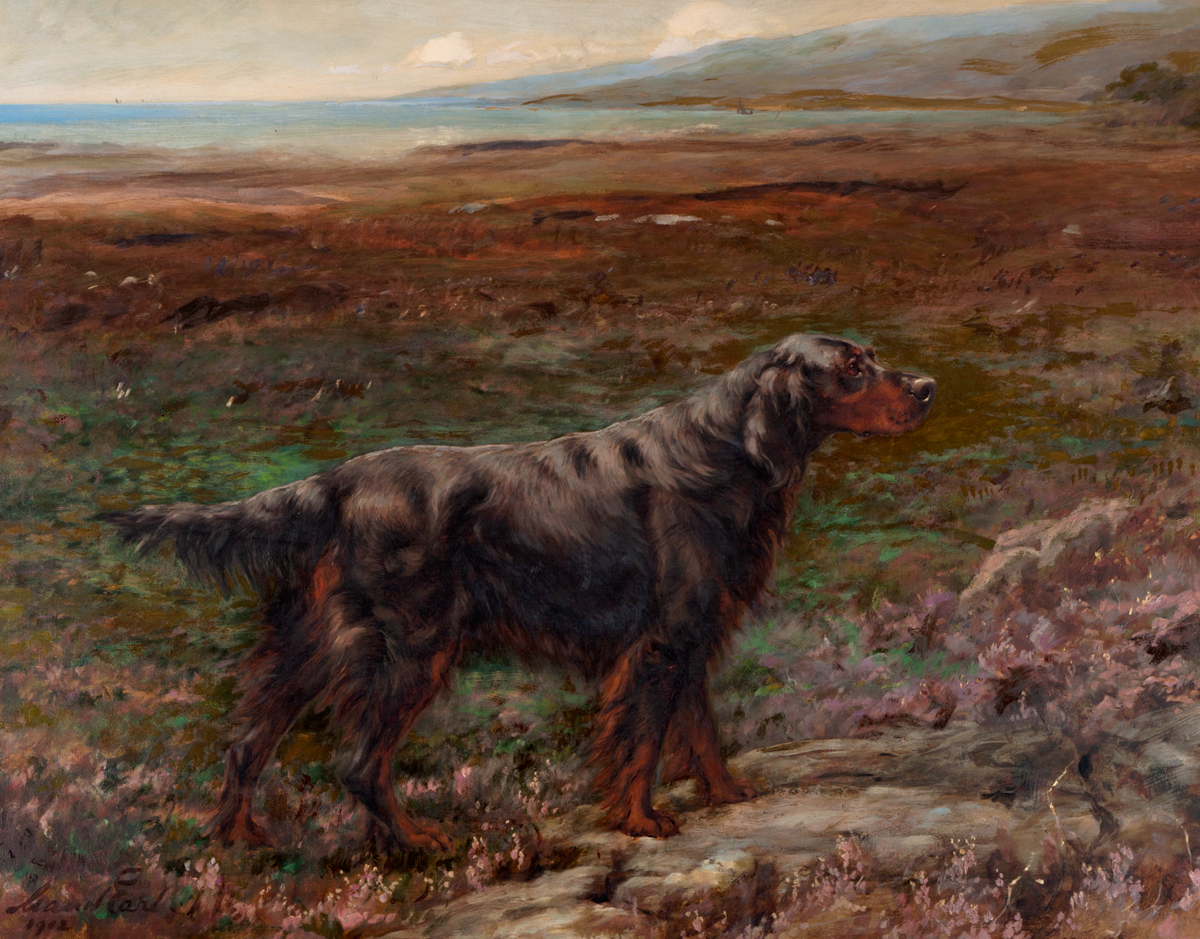

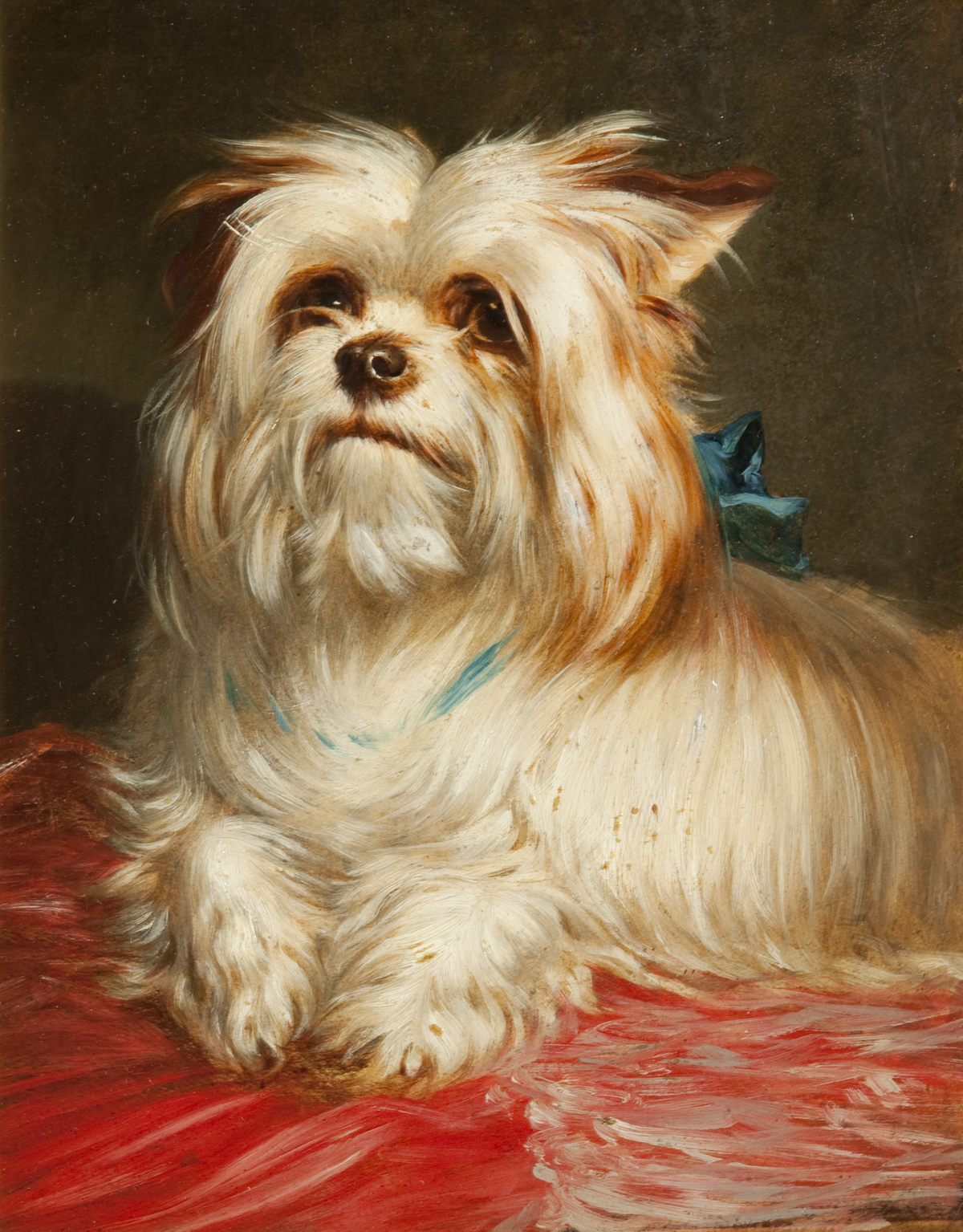

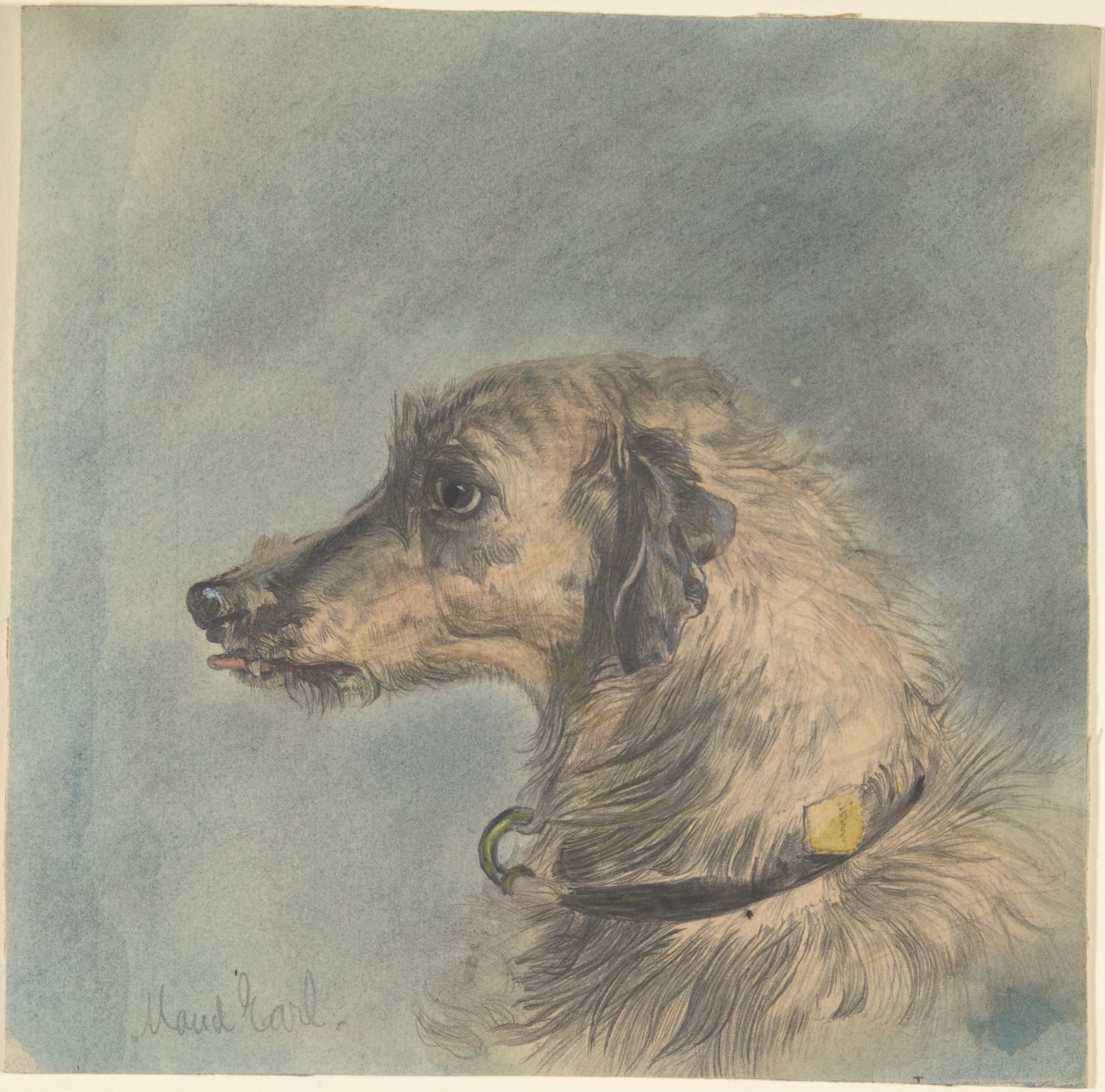

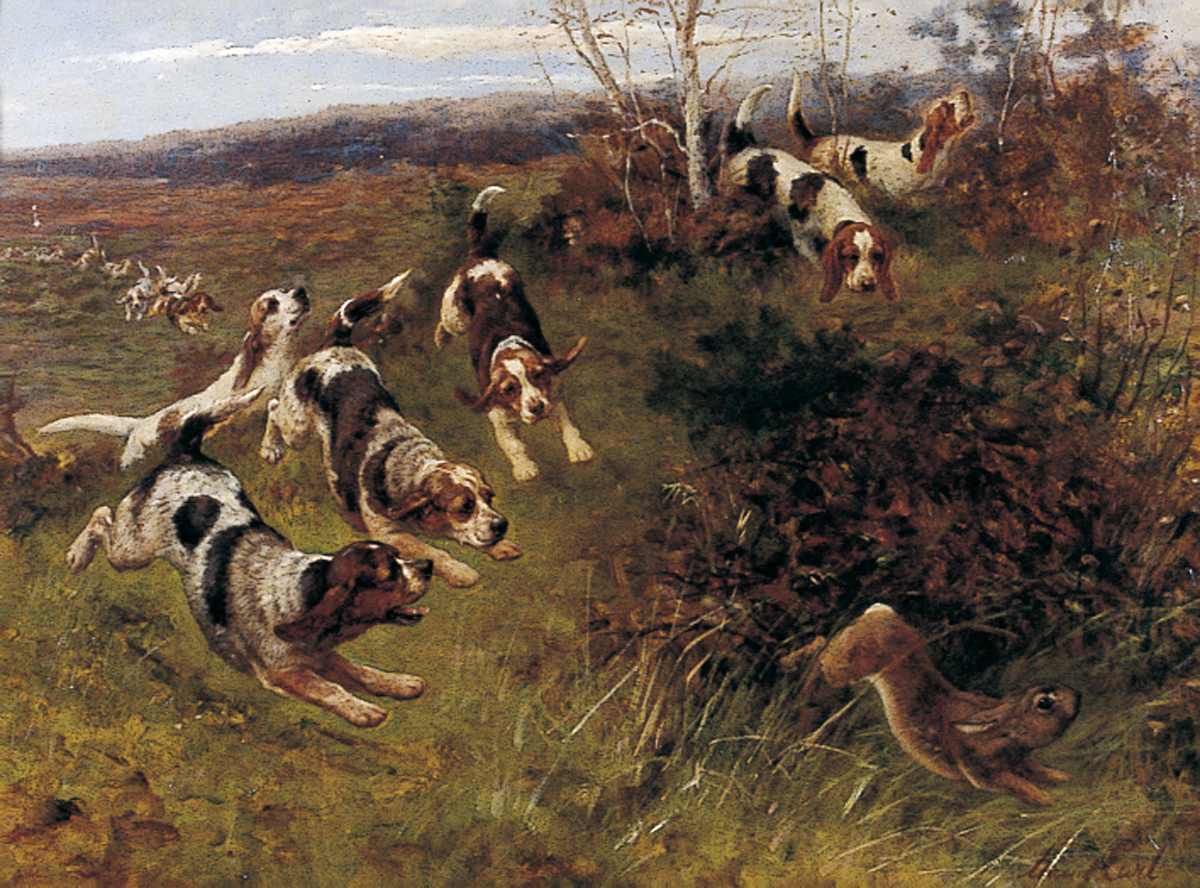
