= American Bully =

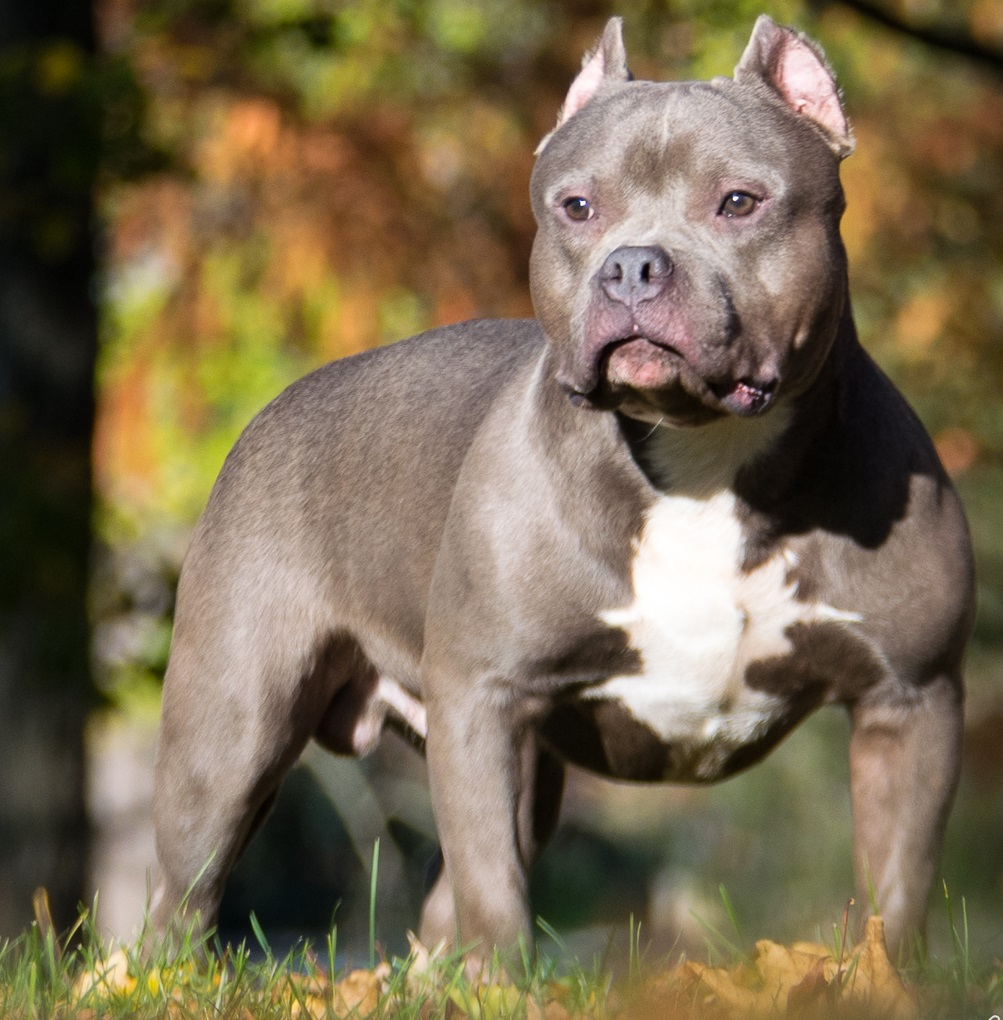
- American Bully
- Common nicknames: Am. Bully; Bully; XL Bully
- Origin: United States
Traits
- Height: 13–20 in (33–50 cm)
- Weight: 44–132 lb (20–60 kg)
- Coat: Short, smooth and glossy
- Color: All colors (except merle)
- Litter size: 4–8
Kennel club standards
- UKC: standard

The American Bully is a modern breed of dog that was developed as a companion dog, and originally standardized and recognized as a breed in 2004 by the American Bully Kennel Club (ABKC). Their published breed standard describes the dog as giving the "impression of great strength for its size".

The majority of major international kennel clubs do not recognize the American Bully as a separate breed, including the UK Kennel Club, the American Kennel Club, and the International Canine Federation (an international federation of national kennel clubs and purebred registries). On July 15, 2013, the breed was recognised by the US-based United Kennel Club (UKC).

Temperament in adult dogs is highly dependent on training, and the breed can be very demanding and needs to be properly trained. Due to its size, strength, aggression and the frequency with which it is involved in lethal attacks on humans, legal controls on the ownership of the breed exist in several countries.

XL American Bullies were responsible for half of all deaths caused by dogs in the UK between 2021 and 2023, leading to their prohibition under the Dangerous Dogs Act.

== Appearance ==
The United Kennel Club (UKC) and American Bully Kennel Club (ABKC) breed standards are similar, except the ABKC recognises four varieties of size, based on height (the Standard, Pocket, XL, and Classic), whereas the UKC recognises only one standard size.

All dogs are classified and shown as Standard until they reach a year of age, at which point they are separated into the varieties and shown against their own type.

=== Standard ===
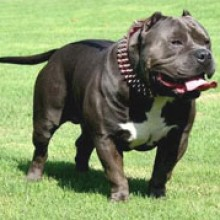
Standard type in side view

The standard American Bully type is a medium-sized dog with a compact bulky muscular body, heavy bone structure and blocky head. Male dogs must be 17 to 20 in (43 to 51 cm), while females must be 16 to 19 in (41 to 48 cm) at the withers.

=== Pocket ===
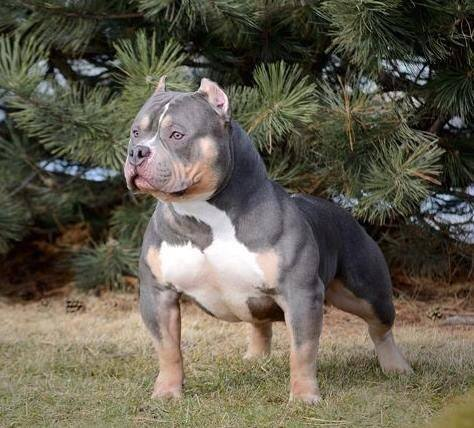
A "pocket" American Bully

The "pocket" type is a smaller variant, with full-grown males 14 to 17 inches (36 to 43 cm), and females 13 to 16 inches (33 to 41 cm), at the withers.

=== XL ===
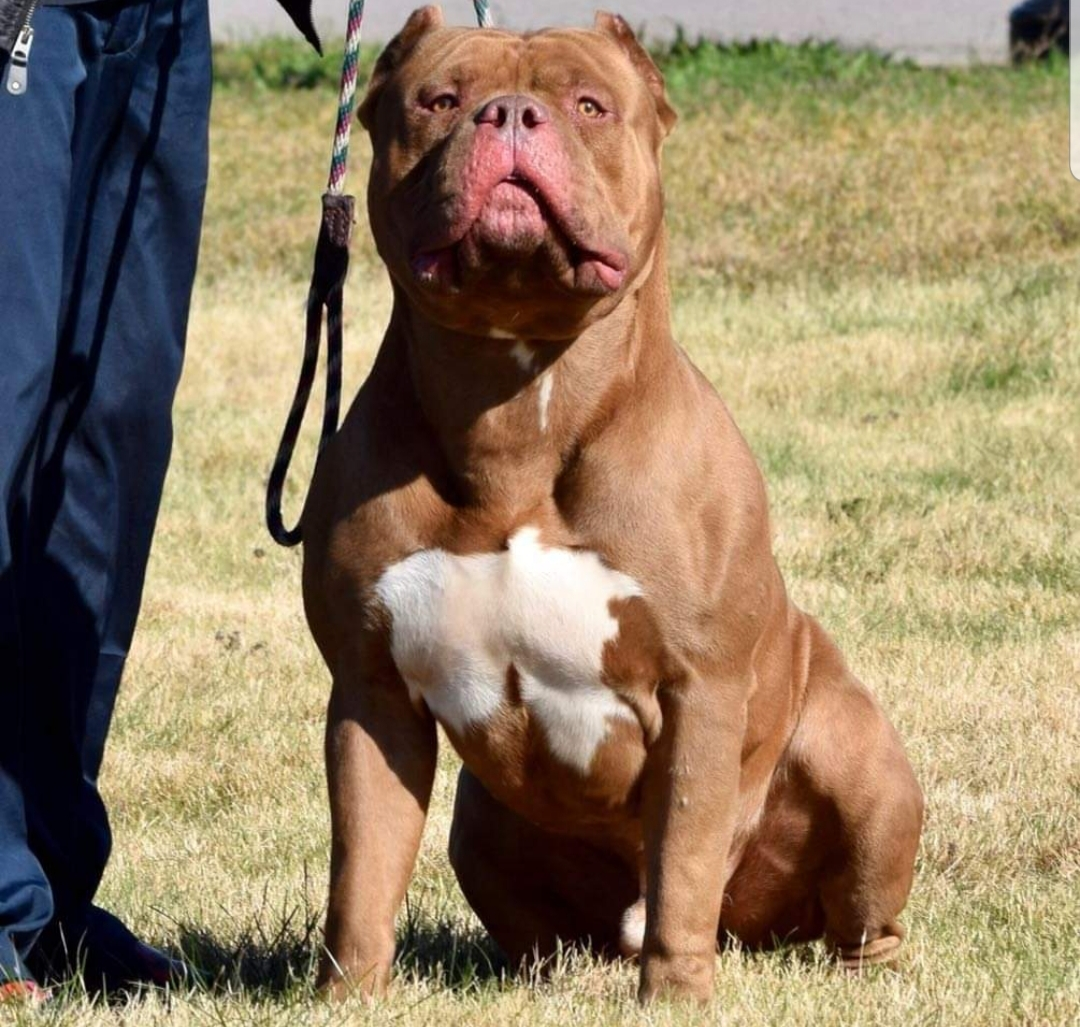
An "XL" American Bully

An "XL" type is determined by its adult height, with males 21 to 23 inches (53 to 58 cm), and females 19 to 22 inches (48 to 56 cm), at the withers.

=== Classic ===
The classic is a lighter-framed dog than the standard, but falls within the same height range. These dogs do not display the exaggerated features often found in the other varieties, and arguably display clearer American Pit Bull Terrier/American Staffordshire Terrier lineage.

=== Non-standard sizes ===
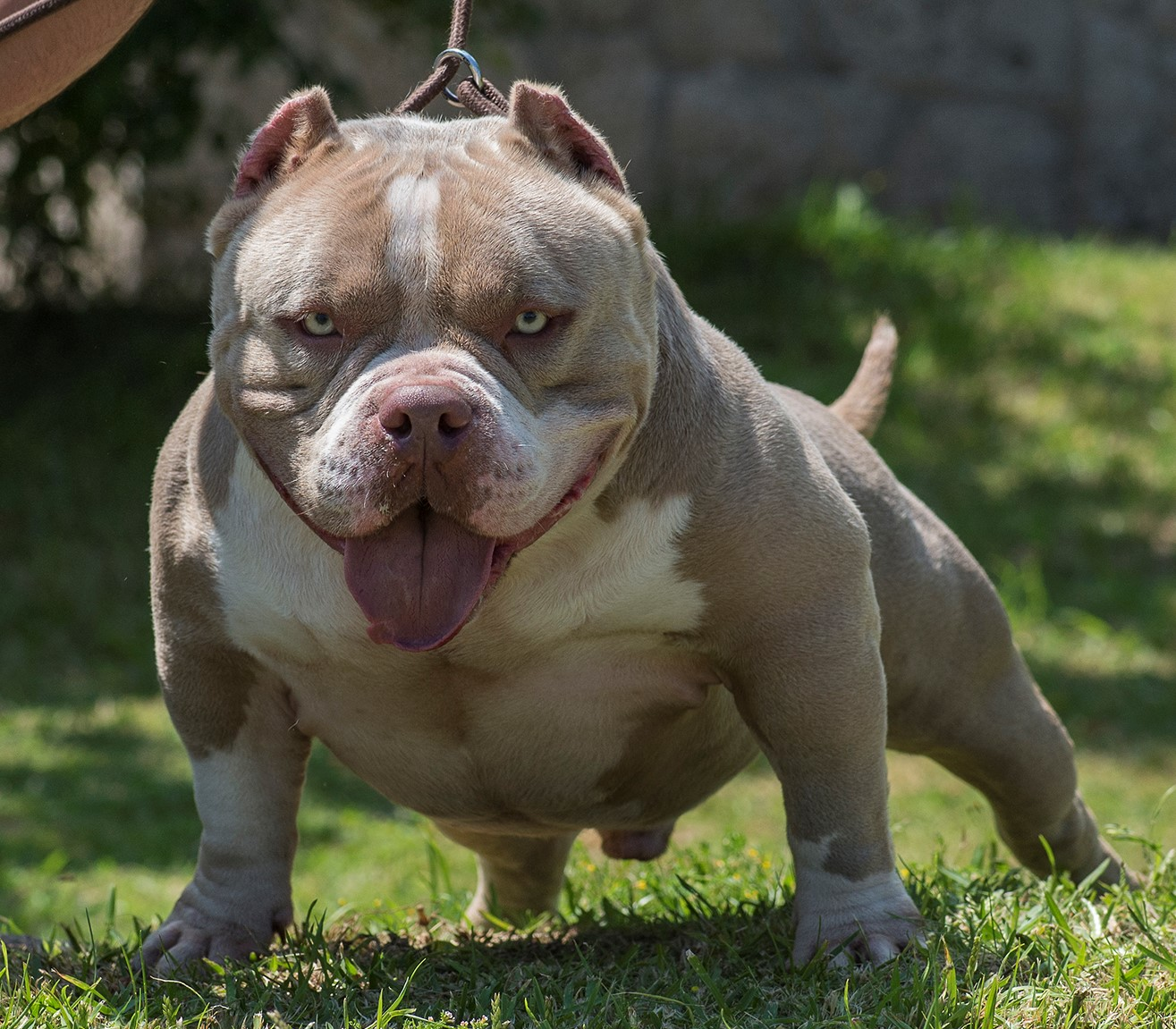
A "micro" American Bully

Outside the official breed standard, some American Bullies are bred to be either smaller or larger than the recognized size categories. Smaller dogs are commonly referred to as “Micro,” while larger ones are often called “XXL.” However, neither of these labels is officially recognized by kennel clubs as legitimate American Bully varieties, as they fall outside the established breed standards.

== Temperament ==
Bully breeders believe that an individual Bully's temperament depends on their breeding and training. Many dogs, despite acting as lapdogs in the home, do well in sports such as weight pull and flirt pole. Human aggression is discouraged in breed standards. Breeders have acknowledged that American Bully dogs can be very dangerous if improperly raised or bred.

== Health ==
As the American Bully is a novel breed there is minimal information on health. A type of congenital ichthyosis exists in the breed and is similar to a form that occurs in the American Bulldog. According to the British Veterinary Association, Mild-hip dysplasia is part of the breed standard for XL-bullies.

== History ==
The American Pit Bull Terrier (APBT) was the foundation (parent breed) used to create the American Bully. The APBT has maintained a characteristic appearance and temperament for over a century, with different strains of APBT emerging within the breed, each with different physical attributes. One particular APBT strain was crossbred to create a stockier physique that breeders originally misrepresented as purebred APBTs. Eventually, enough breeders agreed that these dogs were disparate enough from APBTs that they should be called a different breed altogether.

The American Bully, as it is now known, began development in the 1980s with the majority of the final behavioral and aesthetic product being completed in the 1990s. The breed was first recognized by its breed club, the American Bully Kennel Club (ABKC), in 2004. This registry first acted as a means to document pedigrees and show the breed against its written standard. According to the ABKC, the initial desire for this breed was to produce a dog with a lower prey drive and more of the "bully" traits and characteristics than the American Staffordshire Terrier. Mass and heavy bone was prioritized to ensure such a look, and due to this many of the dogs shown today display the wide front for which they were originally bred. The United Kennel Club state that, although American bullies were an outgrowth of the American American Pit Bull Terrier, several other breeds were used to attain the muscular look breeders desired; including the American Bulldog, English Bulldog, and Olde English Bulldogge.

The American Bully Registry states that the breed was bred to be a companion dog, and that breeders have made efforts to reduce "gameness" (the instinct to fight other dogs) in the breed. According to Bullywatch, the XL-Bully lines present in the UK are extremely inbred, due to the small founding population imported in 2014–2015. Many of these lines originate in an American dog called Kimbo, which sired a large number of dogs that displayed unpredictable aggression towards humans.

== Breed-specific legislation ==
=== Germany ===
Germany has passed a law on dangerous dogs (the Dog Transfer and Import Restrictions Act) in 2001. It prohibits the import or transfer of certain dogs and includes the following breeds: American Staffordshire Terrier, Bull Terrier, Pit Bull Terrier and Staffordshire Bull Terrier, as well as crossbreeds and mixed-breeds of these dogs.

On February 9, 2023, the Rhineland-Palatinate Higher Administrative Court ruled that the classification of a dog whose father was an American Bully as a dangerous dog is permissible under the state law on dangerous dogs.

Within the span of a year, 2 people were killed by American Bullies, both family pets. Statistically, Germany has about 3 fatal dog attacks per year.

=== Ireland ===
In Ireland, the American Bully is restricted as a 'Bandog'. It must be muzzled and on a lead no longer than 2 metres (6 ft 7 in) when in public, amongst other requirements.

On July 12, 2024, Minister for Community Development, Heather Humphreys announced plans to introduce a two stage ban beginning on October 1, 2024. Phase 1 will be a ban on the breeding, rehoming, reselling and importing. Phase 2 will limit ownership to dogs that have been licensed, microchipped and neutered.

=== Turkey ===
In Turkey, it is illegal to own or breed an American Bully.

=== United Arab Emirates ===
The United Arab Emirates "prohibits the possession and circulation of the American Bully for individuals and commercial establishments."

=== United Kingdom ===
XL Bully dogs were responsible for more than 50% (10 of the 19) dog-related human deaths caused by dogs in the UK in the period between 2021 and 2023. In January 2024, the UK Government added XL Bully dogs to the Dangerous Dogs Act 1991, making it illegal to sell, breed, or abandon Bully XL or to have one in public without a lead and muzzle. It became illegal to possess a XL Bully dog without a valid certificate of exemption, public liability insurance, microchipping the dog, neutering the dog, notification of permanent changes in home address, and secure conditions to prevent escape of the dog. A conformation standard was developed to aid enforcement officers in identifying XL Bully dogs by appearance and size.

American bullies first arrived in the United Kingdom in 2014 or 2015, and increased in popularity during the COVID lockdown of 2020–2021. Because the breed is not a registered breed with the UK Kennel Club, it is unknown how many dogs or breeders there are in the UK. Prior to the ban, the government estimated there were 10,000 XL Bully dogs in the UK, but by December 2024 there were 59,500 XL Bully dogs registered with the government (57,000 in England and Wales and 2,500 in Scotland), around 4,500 suspected banned dogs seized, and 800 dogs destroyed. Areas of Liverpool, Birmingham, Cheshire, Doncaster, and Sheffield had the highest rates of XL Bully dog exemption registration per capita.

== See also ==
- American Staffordshire Terrier
- Boxer
- Bull-type terriers
- Bulldog type
- Cephalic index
- Pit bull
