= American Dog Breeders Association =

Dog breed registry

- Abbreviation: ADBA
- Formation: September 1909; 117 years ago
- Type: Kennel club
- Purpose: Promoting the positive aspects of the American Pit Bull Terrier
- Headquarters: Salt Lake City
- Location: Utah
- Region served: United States
- Official language: English
- Website: adbadog.com

The American Dog Breeders Association (ADBA) is an all-breed dog registry founded in 1909 by Guy McCord and Con Feeley. The registry is headquartered in Salt Lake City, UT in the U.S., but has multiple affiliate clubs located around the world. The registry began by promoting the John Colby strain of pit bull types. Over time, the focus changed to the registration and promotion of purebred American Pit Bull Terriers, a breed that few other breed registries have recognized because of its ancestral origins as a fighting dog in England and Ireland. The first official breed registry to recognize American Pit Bull Terriers was the United Kennel Club (UKC) in 1898 when it registered its first dog, "Bennett’s Ring", owned by UKC founder C. Z. Bennett. ADBA sponsors various conformation dog shows, weight pulling competitions, and Top Dog Athletic Events consisting of three canine competitions: treadmill race, wall climb and lure coursing. In 1976, ADBA began publishing a quarterly magazine titled The American Pit Bull Terrier Gazette.

== History ==
The ADBA founded in 1909 by Guy McCord and Con Feeley, both of whom were breeders of American Pit Bull Terriers. They were also friends with John Pritchard Colby of Newberry, MA. who was a breeder of fighting pit bulls which became known as the Colby strain. In the early 1900s, Colby advertised as having "bred and sold more fighting dogs than any one man in America." In the beginning, ADBA considered the Colby strain as "the mainstay of the ADBA which prompted the boast of being the 'home' registration office of the Colby dogs." With the recognition of the American Pit Bull Terrier as a standard breed, the ADBA distanced itself from any association to dog fighting. Breeders with APBTs that were registered with the ADBA became persistent in their efforts to dispel the public's impression that the breed was used only for fighting purposes.

In 1951, the ADBA was managed by Frank Ferris and his wife Florence Colby, widow of John Colby. Activities of the ADBA were limited, but with an exclusive focus on the registration of American Pit Bull Terriers. In 1973, Ferris had his sights on retirement and sold the ADBA to Ralph Greenwood. A few years later, owners of registered dogs petitioned the ADBA to develop a breed standard for conformation dog shows, but they wanted one that was unique to the ADBA rather than copying the breed standards of the American Kennel Club (AKC) or UKC. In 1976, the ADBA formulated the APBT Heritage Conformation Standard on which ADBA sponsored conformation shows are judged; the goal being to maintain the "traits of intelligence, character, loyalty, and the athletic conformation that the breed was originally bred for hundreds of years ago." That same year, ADBA also began publishing a quarterly magazine The American Pit Bull Terrier Gazette which features a variety of topics ranging from dog nutrition, human interest stories, and show results.

== ADBA registration ==
Beginning in early 2015, ADBA investigated and identified issues in the APBT Stud Book which resulted in the following corrections:

- An ideal range of breed weight was added to the breed standard.
- The American Staffordshire Terrier was confirmed as a separate breed; therefore, the American Staffordshire Terriers (Am Staffs) that were registered with AKC were double registered to include ADBA registration.
- Single registrations for crossbreeds between the American Pit Bull Terrier and American Staffordshire Terrier were no longer accepted.
- Prior to ADBA's 2013 acknowledgement of issues in their APBT Stud Book, they had accepted numerous UKC APBT registrations, and recognized the American Bully as a separate breed. On July 15, 2013, UKC accepted the American Bully breed and established the foundation process. Dogs that were previously registered in the APBT Studbook were removed from that registry. Dogs that fit the American Bully breed type were registered as an American Bully. Exceptions included any dog with any condition or exaggeration that has been determined to be detrimental to the health, soundness and general welfare of the American Bully or any other breed.

The ADBA's breed standard for the American Pit Bull Terrier is the standard used in the UK for determining if a dog is of the prohibited "pit bull terrier type" under the Dangerous Dogs Act 1991. In response, the ADBA's breed standard for the APBT includes a disclaimer forbidding its use in determining if a dog meets the definition of a prohibited or restricted dog for breed-specific legislation.

In 2009 the ADBA, along with the Endangered Dog Breeders Association, filed an amicus brief in the case of United States v. Stevens alleging 18 U.S.C. § 48 was too broad and violated the First Amendment.

== Breeds ==
The ADBA is a club focused on preserving the American Pit Bull Terrier breed, and its conformation and sports events are mostly for this breed. Despite this, the club accepts to register all breeds recognized by the UKC and AKC, in addition to registering the new breed Working Pit Bulldog.

== Breed specific laws ==
Within the meaning of section 1 of the Dangerous Dogs Act (1991), a type of dog had a broader meaning than a breed of dog; therefore, in order for a court in the United Kingdom (UK) to conclude that a type of dog was a pit bull terrier, the breed standard set forth by ADBA for American Pit Bull Terriers was used as the axiom for all pit bull types, even though a particular dog did not meet the exact standard. Other countries such as relied upon as the identification protocol of Pit Bull types in "collaboration with Staffordshire University and contributors in the UK, USA, Ireland and Australia."
