= American Pit Bull Terrier =

American dog breed

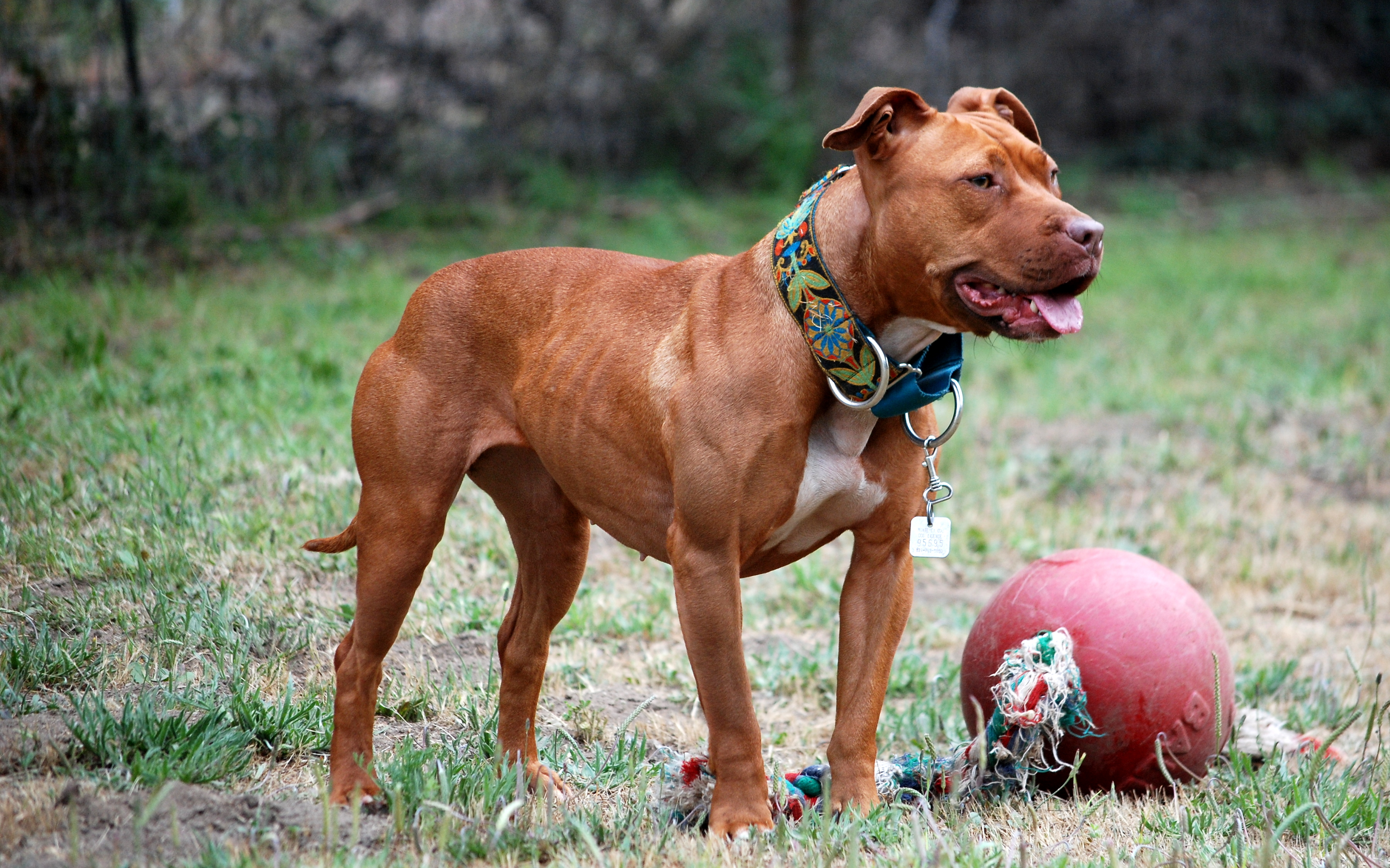
- Other names: Pit Bull; Pitbull Terrier; Pittie
- Common nicknames: Pit; APBT
- Origin: United States
- Foundation stock: Bull and terrier; Old English Bulldog; Old English Terrier
Traits
Height	Males	45–53 cm (18–21 in)
	Females	43–50 cm (17–20 in)
Weight	Males	15.8–27.2 kg (35–60 lb)
	Females	13.6–22.6 kg (30–50 lb)
- Coat: smooth thin single
- Color: Multiple accepted colours and combinations (except merle). Red, black and buckskin are the most common
- Litter size: 5–10
Kennel club standards
- United Kennel Club: standard
- American Dog Breeders Association: standard

The American Pit Bull Terrier (APBT) is a dog breed recognized by the United Kennel Club (UKC) and the American Dog Breeders Association (ADBA), but not the American Kennel Club (AKC). It is a medium-sized, short-haired dog, of a solid build, whose early ancestors came from England. When compared with the English Staffordshire Bull Terrier, the American Pit Bull Terrier is larger by margins of 6–8 inches (15–20 cm) in height and 25–35 pounds (11–16 kg) in weight. The American Pit Bull Terrier varies in size: males are normally about 18–21 inches (45–53 cm) in height and around 35–60 pounds (15–27 kg) in weight, while females are normally around 17–20 inches (43–50 cm) in height and 30–50 pounds (13–22 kg) in weight.

According to the ADBA, the American Pit Bull is described to be medium-sized and has a short coat and smooth well-defined muscle structure, and its eyes are to be round to almond-shaped, and its ears are to be small to medium in length, typically half prick or rose in carriage. The tail is prescribed to be slightly thick and tapering to a point. The coat is required by the ADBA to be glossy, smooth, short, and stiff to the touch. Many colors, color patterns, and combinations of colors are acceptable to the ADBA, except that both the ADBA and UKC do not recognize merle coloring. Color patterns that are typical in the breed are solid and tuxedo.

Despite the colloquial use of the term "pit bull" to encompass a whole category of dogs and the legal use of the term to include several breeds in legislation, some conservative professional breeders of the American Pit Bull Terrier as well as some experts and supporters claim that historically the APBT is the only true "pit bull" and the only breed that should be denominated as such.

Twelve countries in Europe, as well as Australia, Canada, some parts of the United States, Ecuador, Malaysia, New Zealand, Puerto Rico, Singapore, and Venezuela, have enacted some form of breed-specific legislation on pit bull-type dogs, including American Pit Bull Terriers, ranging from outright bans to restrictions and conditions on ownership due to the frequency with which they attack humans. Several states in Australia place restrictions on the breed, including mandatory sterilization.

== History ==
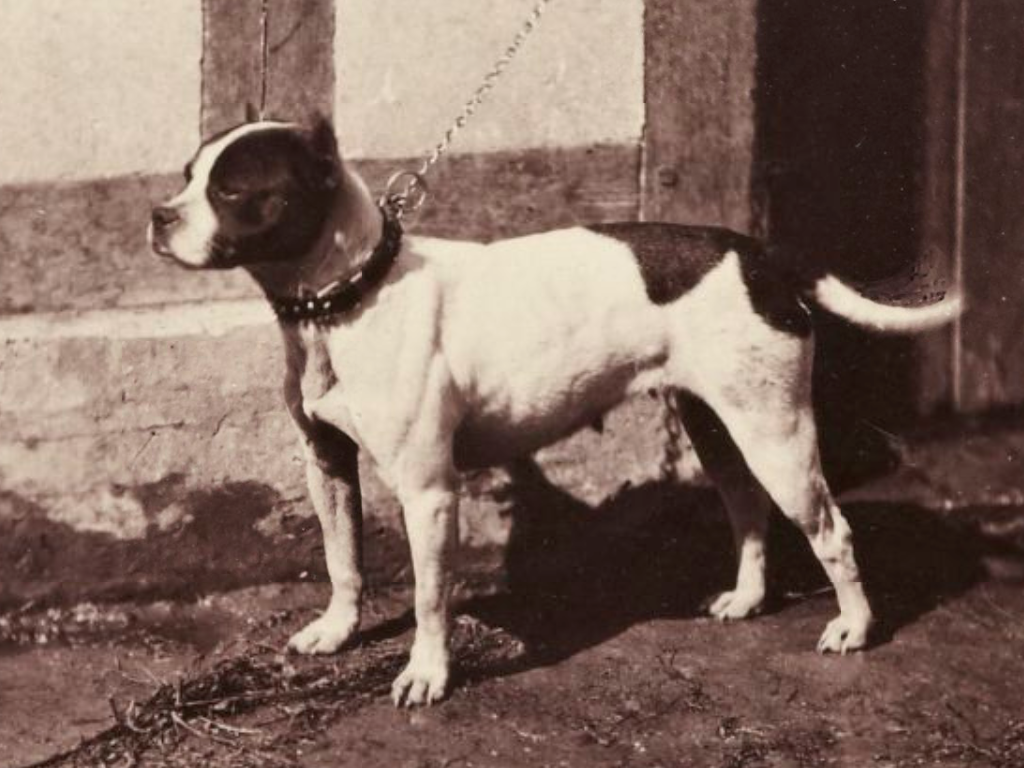
A bull and terrier type. Paris, 1863.

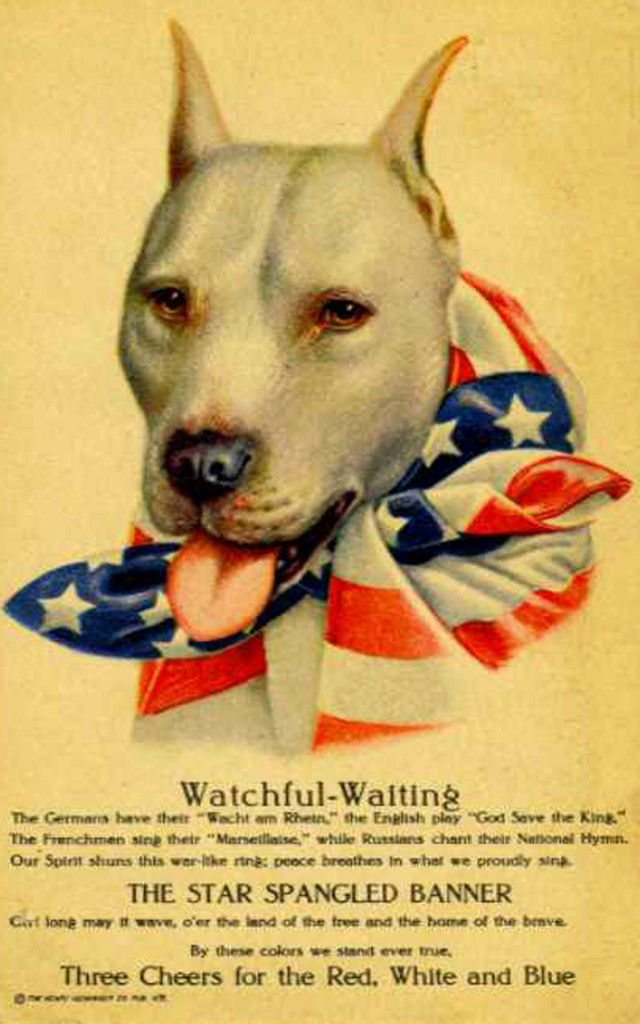
"Watchful-Waiting". World War I poster featuring a pit bull as a representation of the US.

Until the mid-19th century the since-extinct Old English Terriers and Old English Bulldogs were bred together to produce a dog that combined the gameness of the terrier with the strength and athleticism of the bulldog. This type of dog, which was bred in England, became known as the bull and terrier. These dogs arrived in the United States in the late nineteenth century where they became the direct ancestors of the American Pit Bull Terrier.

In the United Kingdom, bull and terriers were used in bloodsports such as bull baiting and bear baiting. These bloodsports were banned in 1835 when Britain introduced animal welfare laws. Since dog fighting is cheaper to organize and far easier to conceal from the law than bull or bear baits, bloodsport proponents turned to pitting their dogs against each other instead. Dog fighting was used as both a bloodsport (often involving gambling) and a way to continue to test the quality of their stock. For decades afterwards, dog fighting clandestinely took place in small areas of Britain. These dogs arrived in America around 1845 to 1860, where the dog fighting practice had continuity. On February 10, 1898, the breed was recognized by the United Kennel Club (UKC) named as American Pit Bull Terrier.

For some time in the early part of the 20th century the UKC began to register the breed name with the word "pit" in parentheses (American (Pit) Bull Terrier), to facilitate public acceptance as an American Bull Terrier. However this only lasted a short time and returned to the previous form.

In the early 20th century, pit bulls were used as catch dogs in America for semi-wild cattle and hogs, to hunt hogs, and drive livestock, and as family companions.

Pit Bull Terriers fill the role of companion dogs, working dogs, athletic sport dogs (weight pulling, French Ring Sport, Top Dog), police dogs, and therapy dogs. Pit Bull Terriers also constitute the majority of dogs used for illegal dog fighting in America In addition, law enforcement organizations report these dogs are used for other nefarious purposes, such as guarding illegal narcotics operations, use against police, and as attack dogs.

In an effort to counter the fighting reputation of pit bull–type dogs, in 1996 the San Francisco Society for the Prevention of Cruelty to Animals renamed pit bull terriers "St. Francis Terriers", hoping that people would be more likely to adopt them. 60 temperament-screened dogs were adopted until the program was halted, after several of the newly adopted pit bulls killed cats. The New York City Center for Animal Care and Control tried a similar approach in 2004, relabeling their pit bulls as "New Yorkies", but dropped the idea in the face of overwhelming public opposition.

== Temperament ==
The UKC gives this description of the characteristic of the American Pit Bull dog: "The essential characteristics of the American Pit Bull Terrier are strength and confidence. This breed is eager to please and brimming over with enthusiasm. The breed's natural agility makes it one of the most capable canine climbers so good fencing is a must for this breed. This breed does very well in performance events because of its high level of intelligence and its willingness to work."

The standard imposed by the ADBA and Old Family Red Nose Registry (OFRNR) considers human aggression a disqualification factor. The American Preservation Dog Registry (APDR) standard points out that "the temperament must be totally reliable with people".

In September 2000, the United States Centers for Disease Control and Prevention (CDC) published a study that examined dog-bite–related fatalities (human death caused by dog-bite injuries) to "summarize breeds of dogs involved in fatal human attacks during a 20-year period and to assess policy implications." The study examined 238 fatalities between 1979 and 1998 in which the breed of dog was known. It found that "the data indicates that Rottweilers and pit bull–type dogs accounted for 67% of human DBRF (dog bite-related fatality) in the United States between 1979 and 1998" and that it was "extremely unlikely that they accounted for anywhere near 60% of dogs in the United States during that same period and, thus, there appears to be a breed-specific problem with fatalities."

Media portrayal has significantly impacted how the American public views the temperament of APBT. A study from 2002 suggests that "news media exaggerates and exacerbates any real or potential problems that exist with Pit Bulls." Other studies also note that many people, including experts such as animal control officers and veterinarians, falsely report any stocky short-haired dogs as Pit Bulls. Consequently, Pit Bulls have a lower probability of adoption or even being taken into shelters for care.

== Health ==
Due to their athleticism and diverse breeding background, the breed tends to be hardy, with an average lifespan of 12 to 14 years, longer than many breeds of a similar size. There are some genetic conditions to be watchful for. The breed tends to have bone diseases such as hip dysplasia, canine degenerative myelopathy and kneecap dislocation. The breed can also have skin problems, such as mange and skin allergies, because of its short coat. Other health ailments seen in the breed include thyroid and congenital heart defects.

The breed tends to have a higher than average incidence of hip dysplasia. Culling for performance has helped eliminate this problem and others such as patella problems, thyroid dysfunction and congenital heart defects. American Pit Bull Terriers with dilute coat colors have not had a higher occurrence of skin allergies as other breeds. As a breed they are more susceptible to parvovirus than others if not vaccinated, especially as puppies, so vaccination is imperative beginning at 39 days old and continuing every 2 weeks until 4 months old, then again at 8 months, and once a year after that, as recommended for all breeds.

They are prone to demodex mange due to culling for performance. There are two different types of demodex mange, namely localized and generalized demodex. Although it is not contagious, it is sometimes difficult to treat due to immunodeficiency in some puppies. The localized symptoms are usually loss of hair in small patches on the head and feet of the puppies. This type will usually heal as the puppies grow and their immune systems grow stronger. The second type, which is generalized demodex mange, is a more severe form of the sickness. The symptoms include loss of hair throughout the entire body and the skin may also be scabby and bloody. Generalized mange is usually hereditary due to immunodeficiency genes that are passed on from sire and dam to their puppies. A simple skin scraping test will allow the vet to diagnose demodex mange. The most widely used method to treat demodex mange is ivermectin injections or oral medications. Since demodex mange lives in the hair follicles of the dog, ivermectin will kill these mites at the source.

== Bloodlines ==
The APBT has several bloodlines, many originating in "professional" dog fighting throughout the 20th century.

Others developed for the conformation shows of the United Kennel Club in the 1980s. While the history and ancestry of the APBT bloodlines can provide context and insight into the breed's development, it is essential to prioritize responsible breeding practices and the well-being of the individual dogs.

=== Castillo Pit Bulls ===
Founded by Tekla Castillo in the early 1980s, her program focused on conformation standards within the UKC. The Castillo bloodline is a lineage of American Pit Bull Terriers known for its unique combination of different breeding lines, resulting in dogs with desirable traits such as strength, intelligence, and temperament. The bloodline's foundation includes dogs such as "PR" Nelson's Hazard Joe, born from breeding between Camarano's Buster Jo and Coonie's Bonnie.

The Castillo bloodline features a mix of other well-known bloodlines, with connections to influential dog breeders like Earl Tudor, Joe Corvino, J.P. Colby, and others. Due to the interconnected nature of the breeding community and the various influences on the bloodline, the Castillo lineage has expanded as a result of the collective efforts of multiple breeders who contributed to its development over time.

=== Colby Pit Bulls ===
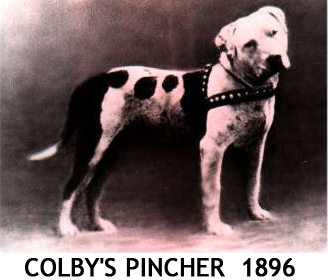
Colby's Pincher, a great-grandson of the famous Lloyd's Pilot. Weight 56 pounds. US, 1896.

The Colby dogs are a black-nosed bloodline that served as one of the pillars of the APBT breed. Considered one of the most important and famous bloodlines, the Colby dogs were started by John Pritchard Colby in 1889, who acquired the best fighting dogs (bull and terriers) imported from Ireland and England. One of the most famous dogs of his bloodline was Colby's Pincher. Pincher was widely used as a stud dog. For this reason, Pincher is present in the pedigree of the vast majority of APBT specimens. The Colby dogs bloodline remains preserved by the family of John P. Colby.

=== Old Family Red Nose ===
Old Family Red Nose (OFRN) is a strain or a family of bloodlines originating in Ireland, and known for their specific and unique reddish coloration. Many dogs of the OFRN strain has a copper-red nose and coat, red lips, red toe nails, and red or amber eyes. Not every American Pit Bull Terrier with these characteristics is necessarily an OFRN, since for this the dog must have a high percentage of the recognized bloodlines of this family in its pedigree.In the middle of the 19th century, there was a strain of pit dogs in Ireland that were known as "Old Family". At that time, all the bloodlines were closely inbred with each family clan. Since red is recessive to all colors but white, the strain was known as “Irish Old Family Reds.” The "Old Family Reds" dogs found their way to America in the 19th century, mainly via Irish immigrants, though many in the United States did import the breed.

Although once renowned for its gameness, it was later bred to maintain its reddish color. Some of the most reputable breeders of the past, such as Lightner, McClintock, Hemphill, Williams, Menefee, Norrod and Wallace have contributed to the preservation and development of the strain. Finally, as McNolty said in his 30-30 Journal (1967), "Regardless of one's historical perspective, these old amber-eyed, red-nosed, red-toe-nailed, red-coated dogs represent some of the most significant pit bull history and tradition that stands on four legs today."

== American Staffordshire Terrier ==
In 1935 in England a Cradley Heath bull and terrier strain was accepted and registered as a purebred breed by The Kennel Club as Staffordshire Bull Terrier. One year later in America the American Kennel Club (AKC) noted the growing popularity and acceptance of a similar breed already registered years earlier by the United Kennel Club (UKC), the American Pit Bull Terrier. The AKC finally decided to accept to register and recognize the American breed, but would rename the breed with the commitment that the associate breeders would not breed dogs for dogfighting.

American Bull Terrier without the "pit" (a word that referred to dogfighting arenas) was the first name considered by the AKC, but quickly dismissed due to protests by English Bull Terrier's breeders. Yankee Terrier was another option, also dismissed. The name "Staffordshire Terrier" was chosen with the claim that the breed originally came from Staffordshire in England. On June 10, 1936, around 50 UKC dogs entered the AKC stud book under the name Staffordshire Terrier. Wilfred Truman Brandon founded the AKC Staffordshire Terrier Club of America (STCA). The Colby dog named Colby's Primo was one of the first to be regarded as an ideal model of the breed standard in the AKC. The AKC stud book was opened a few more times until it was last closed around the 1970s. In 1972 the AKC changed the name of the breed to American Staffordshire Terrier as it already intended to recognize the British Staffordshire Bull Terrier as a separate breed in subsequent years.

An argument persists concerning whether the American Pit Bull Terrier and the American Staffordshire Terrier are two separate breeds or still the same breed. Pit Bull and AmStaff breeders have distanced themselves from each other by pursuing different goals over the last 30 years, producing dogs with physical and temperament differences. Since 2015, the American Dog Breeders Association (ADBA), which has registered the American Pit Bull Terrier since 1909, considers the American Staffordshire Terrier to be a separate breed. The UKC is the only kennel club at the moment to accept to register American Staffordshire Terriers as American Pit Bull Terriers. The UKC conformation champions are very similar to those of the AKC, as both clubs share many judges. The AKC has not accepted to register American Pit Bull Terrier as American Staffordshire Terriers since the late 20th century.

To this day there are dogs called "dual registered dogs", registered at the same time as American Staffordshire Terrier in the AKC and American Pit Bull Terrier in the UKC, due to past breeders who decided to keep the two pedigree registers parallel. Since 2015 the ADBA classifies most (or all) of these dual registered (AKC-UKC) dogs as American Staffordshire Terriers.

The ADBA conformation champion dogs differ greatly from UKC and AKC champion dogs. The AKC standard does not accept red nosed dogs. The UKC dogs and the AmStaff are generally heavier and more robust and bulky than the ADBA American Pit Bull Terrier dogs.

== Activities ==
American Pit Bull Terriers excel in many dog sports, including weight pulling, dog agility, flyball, lure coursing, and advanced obedience competition. Out of the 115 dogs who have earned UKC "superdog" status (by gaining championship titles in conformation, obedience, agility, and weight pull), 34 have been American Pit Bull Terriers, and another 13 were American Staffordshire Terriers. Aside from serving as a companion dog, the American Pit Bull Terrier can be a working dog and is suitable for a wide range of working disciplines due to their intelligence, high energy, and endurance. In the United States they have been used as search and rescue dogs, police dogs performing narcotics and explosives detection, Border Patrol dogs, hearing dogs to provide services to the deaf, as well as general service dogs, including therapy dogs.

American Pit Bull Terriers may be used as hunting dogs, especially because their powerful jaws can be useful in restraining feral hogs. However, the Australian Royal Society for the Prevention of Cruelty to Animals (RSPCA) describes how this practice can be dangerous for the hunting dogs, noting that the dogs may experience severe injuries, "heat exhaustion, poisoning, vehicular trauma, snake bite, and accidental shooting".

== Breed-specific legislation ==
United Kingdom, Portugal, Australia, Ecuador, Malaysia, New Zealand, the territory of Puerto Rico, Singapore, Venezuela, Trinidad and Tobago, Denmark, Israel, France, Germany, Norway, Poland, Romania, Spain, Cyprus, Switzerland, and Turkey have enacted some form of breed-specific legislation on pit bull–type dogs, including American Pit Bull Terriers, ranging from outright bans to restrictions on import and conditions on ownership. The state of New South Wales in Australia places restrictions on the breed, including mandatory sterilization.

Certain cities in the United States, as well as the province of Ontario, Canada, have banned ownership of the American Pit Bull Terrier. In the United Kingdom, it is against the law to own, sell, abandon, give away, or breed a Pit Bull Terrier. As of September 2023, restrictions have been declining with at least 120 repeals since 2018.

In 2014, new statistical evidence emerged regarding the province-wide ban on "pit bulls", more specifically the American Pit Bull Terrier and American Staffordshire Terrier, in the Canadian province of Ontario. Since the ban had been implemented, dog bites involving pit bull types, as identified by the owners or city investigators, had dropped considerably as the registered populations of these breeds decreased in the province's largest city, Toronto. However, "Toronto's reported dog bites have been rising since 2012, and in 2013 and 2014, reached their highest levels this century, even as pit bulls and similar dogs neared local extinction," and evidence published in Global News implicates several other dog breeds had contributed to the rise.

== See also ==
- List of dog breeds
- American Staffordshire Terrier
- Bull and terrier (ancestor of the APBT)
- Bull-type terriers
- Dog fighting in the United States
- Old English Bulldog
- Pit Boss
- Pit Bulls & Parolees (TV series)
