= Flirt pole =

Exercise device for dogs

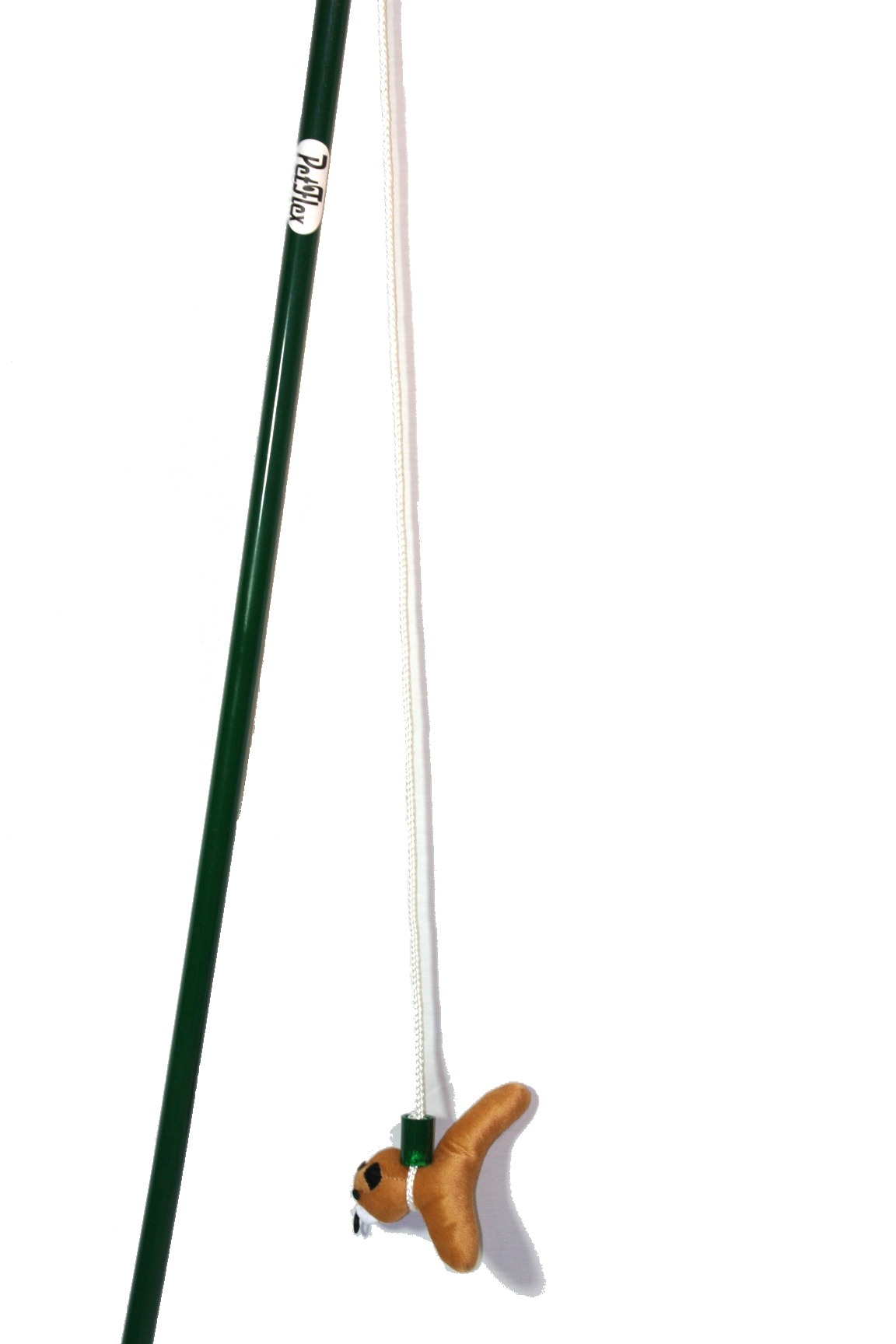
Flirt pole

A flirt pole, also called a "flirt stick", is a piece of exercise equipment for dogs that entices a dog to chase a fast moving lure. This equipment is often used to physically condition a dog and improve the dog's skills for better performance in certain competitions such as lure-coursing or Schutzhund. It is often used simply to get a dog to exert a lot of energy in a small space.

== Operation ==
A flirt pole is constructed of a long stick or pole made of a light wood, like bamboo, or a light plastic, like PVC, with a long string or rope attached at one end. Attached to the other end of the rope is a lure such as a dog toy, hide, rag, or other item depending on the exercise goal. The pole is typically 3 to 5 feet (0.91 to 1.52 m) long with the rope about the same length, and the construction is similar to a fishing pole.

=== Movements ===
The owner or trainer holds the pole and through a variety of motions, moves the rope and the lure. The idea is to move the lure so that the dog cannot catch it easily, i.e., "flirt" with the dog.

- The owner generally stands in one place while working the pole to make the lure "active" or moving. Standing in one spot and rotating to swing the pole around in a circle will cause the lure to move quickly in a wider circle.
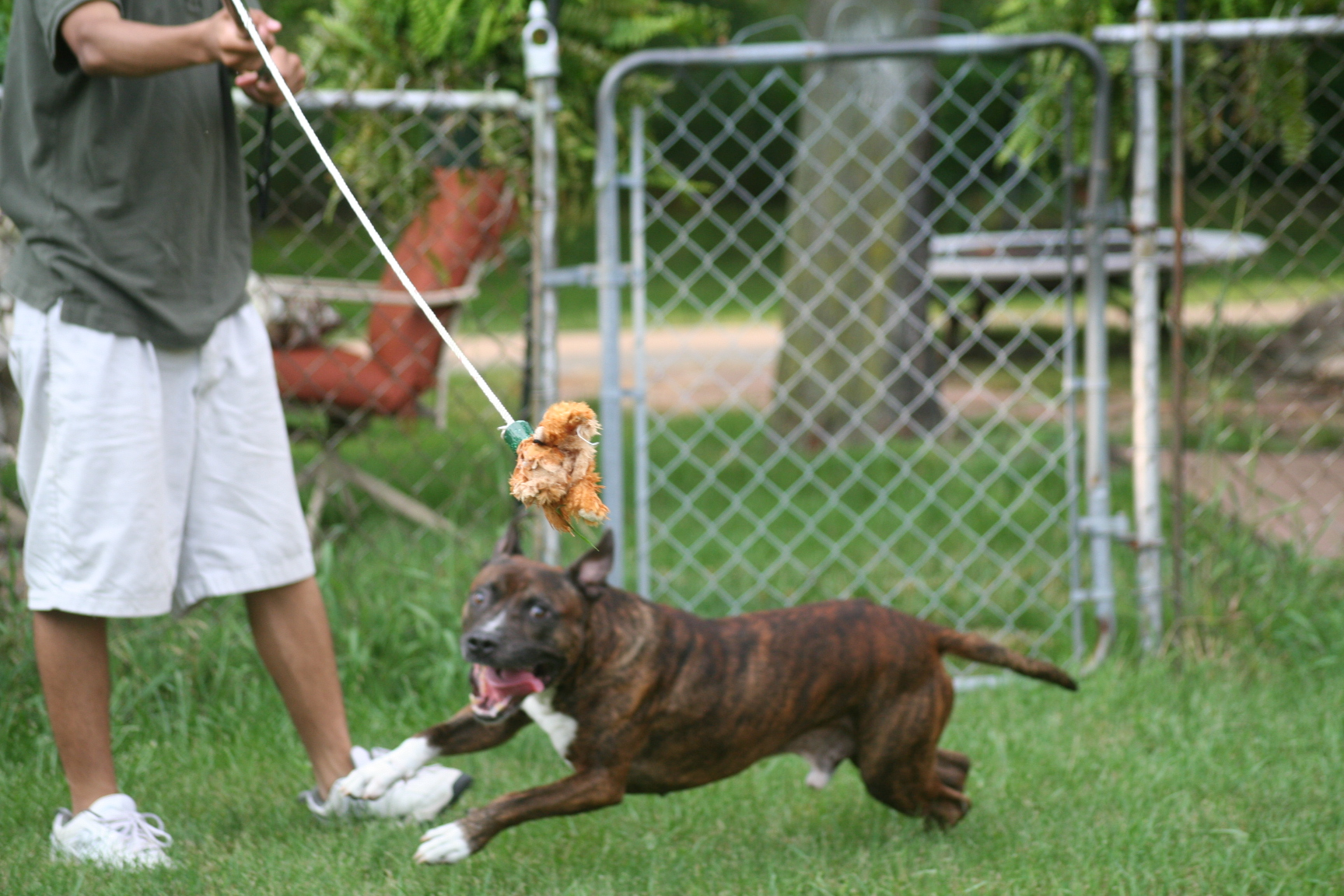
  Exercise with flirt pole where dog runs to chase lure
- Swinging while dragging the lure along the ground will create an effect of an animal running or an object escaping. In turn, the dog will run to chase the lure.
- By snapping (flicking or quickly jerking) the pole, the trainer causes the lure to "change directions".
- Jerking or swinging the pole higher so the lure is in the air entices the dog to jump while attempting to catch the object.
- To prevent the dog from catching the lure too easily, the trainer can move the pole (and lure) faster, snap the pole to change directions, or swing the lure in the air, just out of the dog’s reach.

Occasionally the dog will, or must be allowed to, catch the lure. This is a necessary part of the exercise; dog games that never reward the dog for their hard work tend to make them distraught and unbalanced. (For this reason, bomb- and drug-sniffing dogs have been found to become mentally unhinged if they never find bombs or drugs and are occasionally taken on dummy missions where they have successful finds.)

Additionally, once the dog has caught the lure, the trainer can engage in pulling exercises by tugging at the pole and encouraging the dog to pull back (creating a "tug-o-war") in order to keep its prize.

Trainers gives the dog a command to release the lure and may resume swinging the pole or end the session.

=== Principles ===
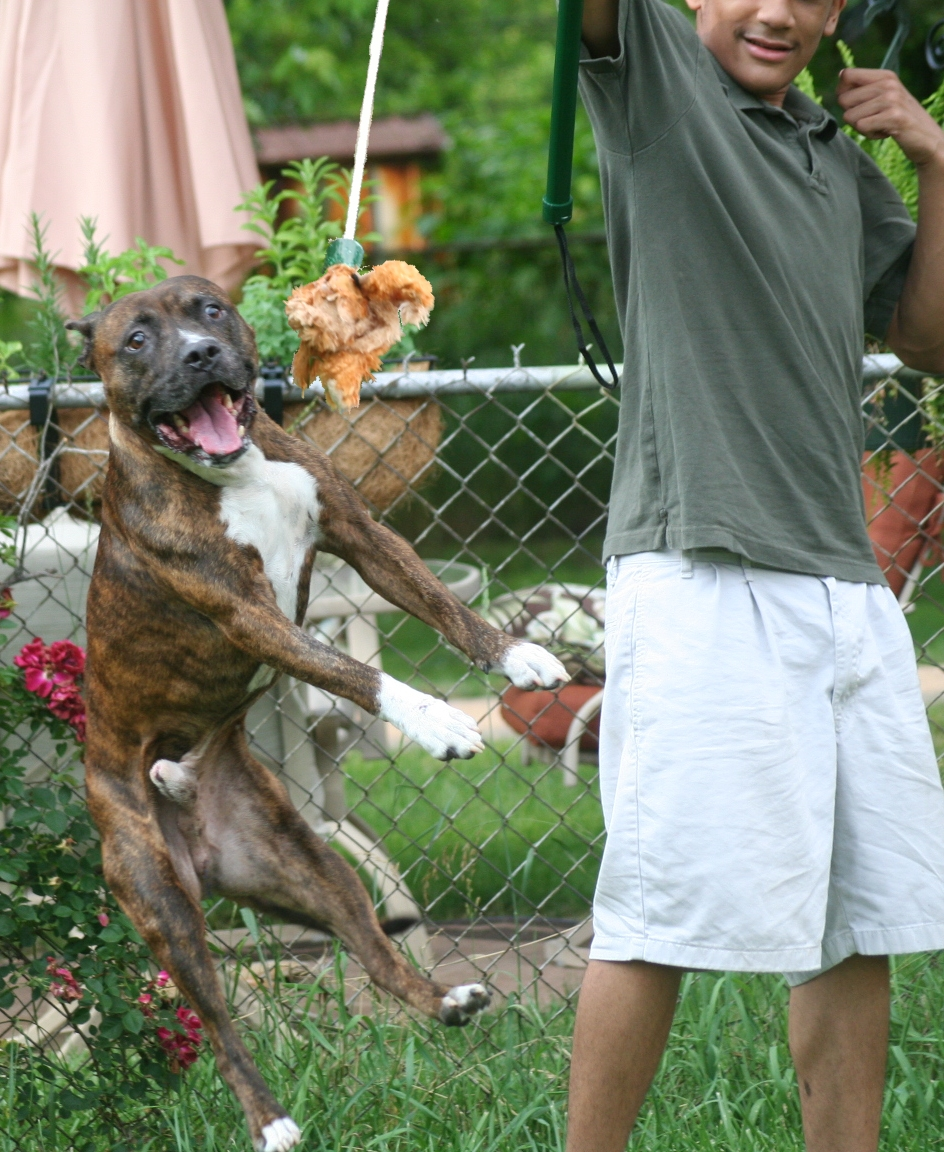
Flirt pole used to condition dog for running and jumping.

The flirt pole is used to condition dog for running and jumping. Dogs have a natural prey drive that compels them chase after and kill prey, typically smaller animals. In dog training, the prey drive can be used as an advantage because dogs with strong prey drive are also willing to pursue moving objects such as toys, thus encouraging the dog to move or act in a particular way.

The flirt pole promotes physical activity and stimulates mental activity from the dog (running, jumping, watching, planning, changing direction) by stimulating the dog’s prey drive by offering a constantly moving lure. The long pole and flexible rope make it easy for the trainer to use momentum to make the lure move fast (even faster than the dog can run), change directions quickly or move at variable heights.

The more the trainer can maneuver the pole and rope to make the lure emulate the way a small animal moves (even if the lure is non-animal, such as a rag), the more interest the dog keeps in the object.

Even though the basis of the flirt pole is engaging the dog's prey drive, these exercises do not necessarily increase the drive. In fact, many trainers like to use the flirt pole to give dogs an opportunity to express prey drive in a non-destructive way, and use the flirt pole as a part of the training and socialization.

== Uses ==
In general, dogs that are inclined to run, jump, and chase enjoy the play time with this type of equipment that allows them to indulge in their natural tendencies. Flirt poles are often used in specific types of dog training.

=== Schutzhund ===
Schutzhund is a dog sport, developed in Germany, that tests dogs on police tasks including odor detection and search and rescue. Flirt pole work is often used in training to teach skills that the dog will need later in protection work, in particular, targeting skills and grip. A flattened plastic bottle as a lure is hard to grip and teaches the dog to bite hard and hang on.

=== Dog fighting ===
Even though the practice of dog fighting is illegal, historically several types of equipment have been used to train and condition fighting dogs. A flirt pole was commonly used to train these dogs for cardiovascular and speed workouts and to encourage prey drive.

=== Lure coursing ===
Using a flirt pole with a cloth or rag is common with trainers who train for lure coursing and other activities where high prey drive is desired, and is referred to as "rag work". The moving of the rag encourages the development of prey drive; catching the rag and shaking it afterwards build confidence.

=== Professional breeding ===
Some trainers and researchers advocate beginning stimulation and socialization very early in a puppy’s life, especially for dogs that will be working dogs. This creates dogs that have solid temperaments and are well-socialized. Some professional breeders advocate using flirt pole skill exercises as a part of that conditioning in order to create acceptable outlets for the prey drive, which, along with bite inhibition training, decreases the likelihood of a puppy using his prey drive in an inappropriate manner.

=== General use ===
Dog owners and dog walkers who need to exercise dogs but are unable to walk them (for example when the person is unable to walk or walking may be dangerous) sometimes use a flirt pole as a solution to exerting the dog's energy in a small space, in a room or backyard.

== Health effects ==
In addition to improving a dog's skills (in particular for competitive dogs), flirt pole exercises improve canine health. Active flirt pole work helps to strengthen heart and lung function, improve balance, fine-tune motor skills, and strengthen muscles and joints.

Any exercise for dogs, including with the flirt pole, helps release anxious energy (which leads to destructive behaviors) and to maintain healthy body functions.

=== Risks ===
The type of activity that a flirt pole encourages is for healthy dogs in good physical condition. Flirt pole exercises should not be done with very young dogs (under a year) or with dogs that are not in good health such as obese dogs, dogs with joint problems or dogs with heart problems.

Health risks include muscle and joint injuries, especially if jumping is involved since poor landings result in injury, and over-exertion (too much hard running). In addition, without proper training, retrieving the lure from the dog may be challenging.

== See also ==
- Dog training
