= Weight pulling =

Dog sport

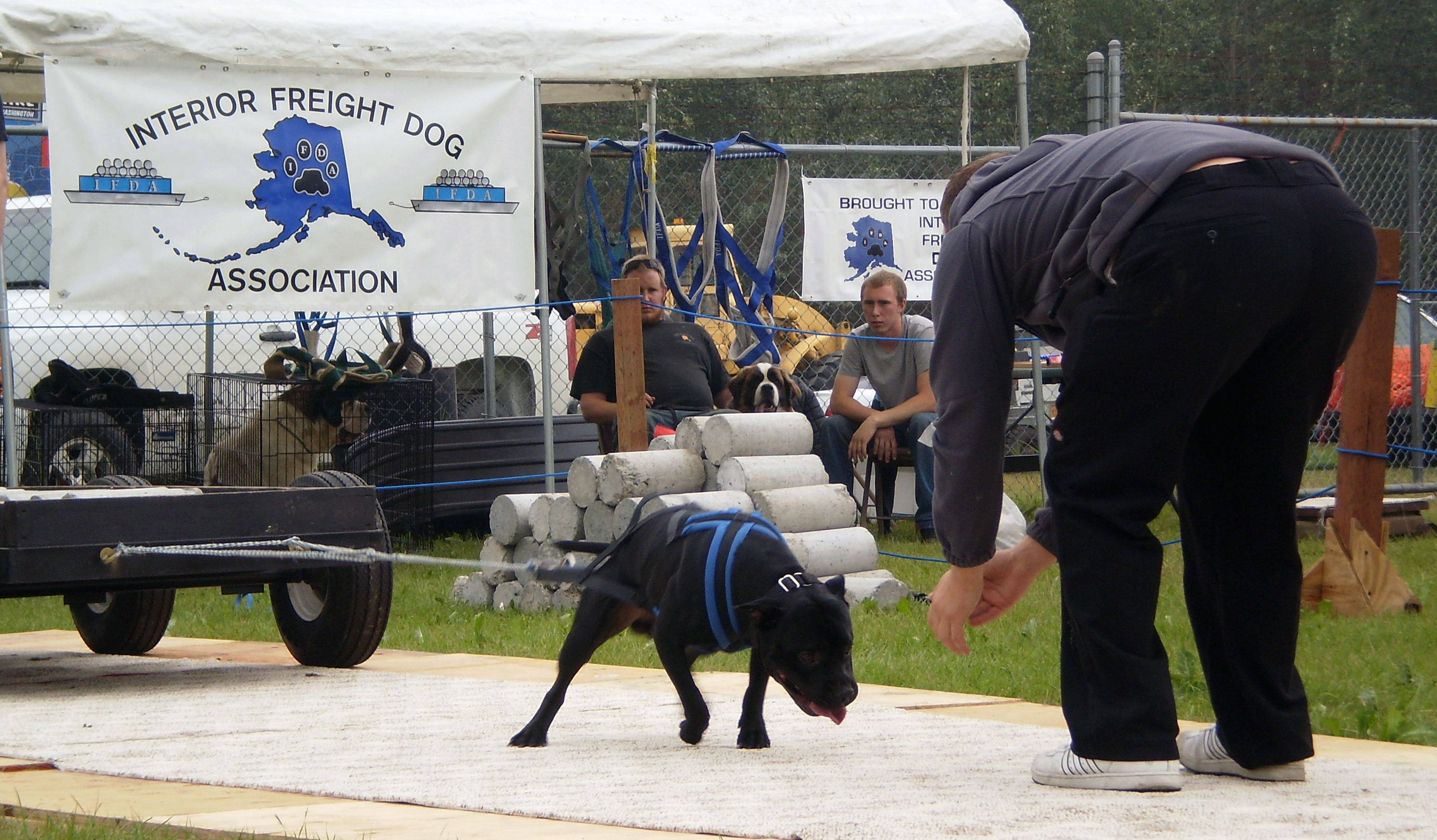
- An American Staffordshire terrier pulls a cart loaded with concrete.

Weight pulling is a dog sport involving a dog pulling a cart or sled loaded with weight a short distance across dirt/gravel, grass, carpet, or snow. It is a modern adaptation of freighting, in which dogs were used as freight animals to move cargo.

== History ==
Canine weight pull has a long history dating to at least the Klondike Gold Rush, where it was used as means of entertainment while trialing sled dogs used for freighting gear and passengers through Arctic and sub-Arctic terrain in North America. Mail delivery was also conducted by dog sled in these remote settlements until the 1930s with the last postal dog sled team being retired in 1963. For both freighting and mail delivery, dogs were expected to meet minimum standards of strength and speed, ranging from 75–100 pounds (34–45 kg) per dog on the faster mail team to 200 lb (91 kg) per dog on the slow freighting team. Jack London's 1903 book The Call of the Wild makes one of the first literary references to the sport where the fictional dog Buck pulls a heavily loaded sled while spectators place bets on his ability. London spent almost a year in the Yukon, and his observations form much of the material for the book.

== Objectives ==
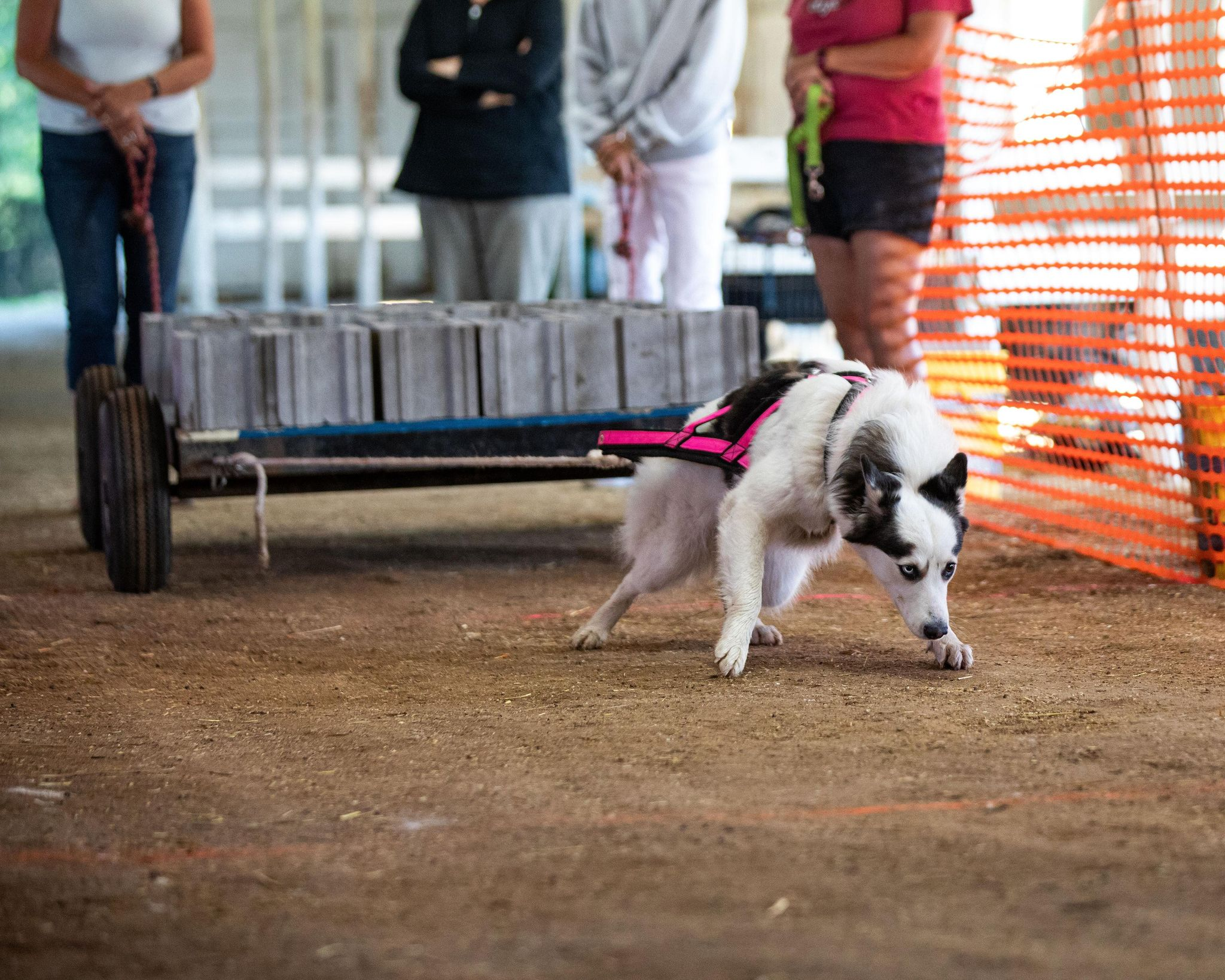
A Yakutian Laika pulling a cart over dirt

Weight pull matches start with either an empty cart or sled or at low weights. Carts may be placed on dirt, carpet or even rails. Dogs are sorted into classes by weight and then fitted with a specially constructed freighting harness designed to distribute the weight and minimize the chance of injury. At the start of a round, dogs are asked to pull the car or 16 feet within a set time frame. Dogs who successfully complete the round are eligible to go on to the next round. At the completion of each round, additional weight is added to the vehicle. The winner of each class is the dog who pulls the most weight.

While historically associated with freighting and carting dog breeds, today's weight pull competitions are open to any dog regardless of breed, size or sex.

== Sanctioning organizations ==
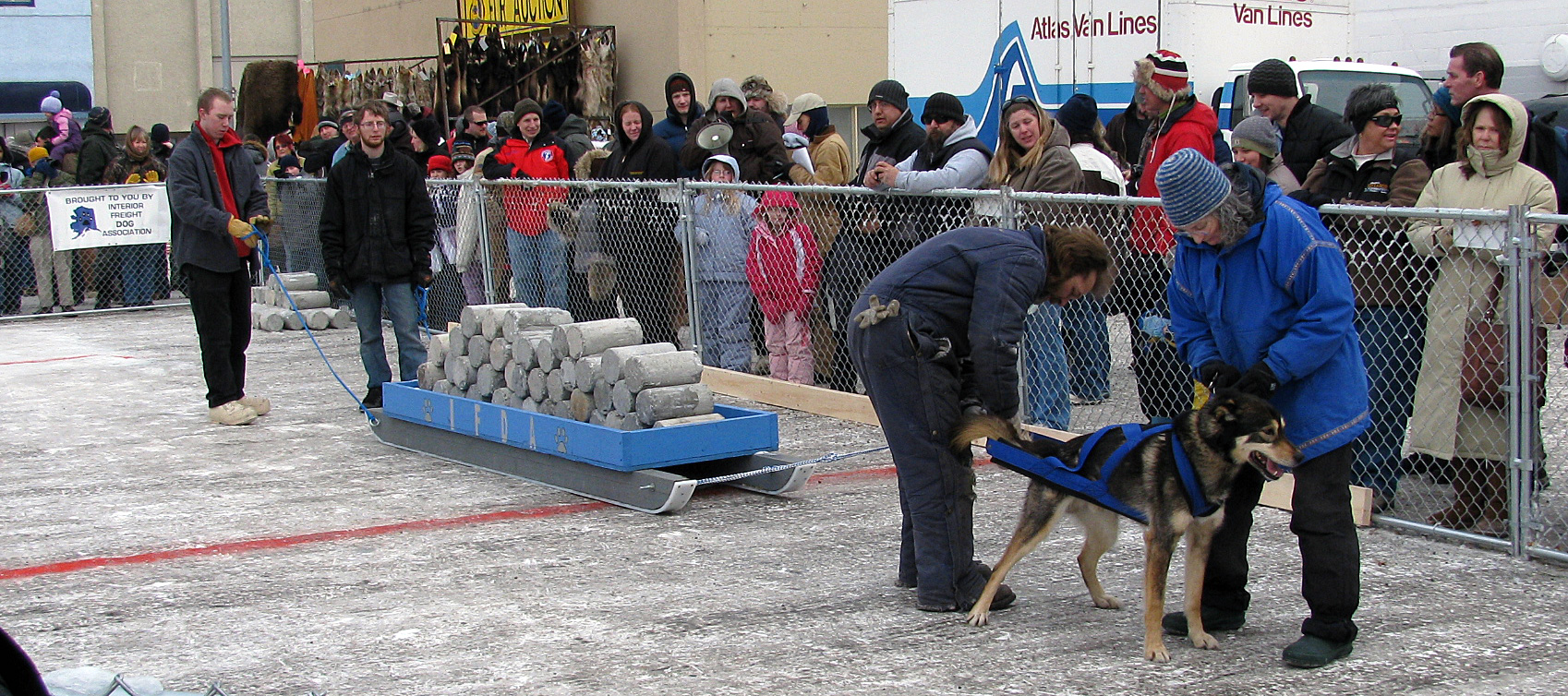
Weight pull on ice

Canine weight pulling competitions are sanctioned by various organizations, each with their own rules.

- The International Sled Dog Racing Association was the first to sanction weight pull matches. Matches were held exclusively on snow in conjunction with their sled dog races.
- The Alaskan Malamute Club of Wisconsin started offering weight pull matches on snow in November 1971. In 1984, the Alaskan Malamute Club of America expanded these rules to include carts and began offering sanctioned weight pull across the US.
- The International Weight Pulling Association was organized in 1984 to promote the heritage of the working dog. IWPA operates in North America. Since IWPA's organization in 1984, no dogs have been hurt in competition.
- Since 2000, the American Pulling Alliance has also offered sanctioned competitions in North America as well as Europe.
- In 2008, the World Wide Weight Pull Organization started to offer weight pull to all dogs, regardless of breed.
- The United Kennel Club also includes Weight Pull as one of their dog sports.
- Alaskan Malamute Clubs in the UK, and Australia offer sanctioned weight pull competitions based on the Alaskan Malamute Club of America's weight pull rules.
- Other breed clubs also offer weight pull, such as American Dog Breeders Association.
- In the 2010s other organizations started offering sanctioned competitions, such as National Working Dog Association.
- In 2012, GPA (Global Pulling Alliance) was formed to focus on educating the general public about the sport of weight pulling as a positive outlet for active canines across the globe. GPA holds competitions in 6 countries; United Kingdom, Mexico, Puerto Rico, Philippines, Ireland, and the United States, and continues to add to their list as the sport grows in popularity.
- The European Weight Pull League sanctions matches throughout Europe.
- Bulgaria also has started to promote the sport by a club called Weight Pulling & Sporting Dogs Bulgaria.
- Since 2014 Lithuania has a dog weight pulling club called "Weight Pulling Lithuania".
- Dogs Australia (formerly ANKC - Australian national kennel club) has sanctioned weightpull events since 2015.

Weight pulling is included in the sled sports discipline and in 2025 there are currently 5 recognised titles dogs may achieve in competition.

== Controversy ==
Proponents of weight pull cite the improved fitness and wellbeing of the dogs, especially working breeds. Handlers often cite improved bond with their dog and that no force or baiting with food is used to convince the dogs to pull. The activity has been criticized as cruel or harmful by animal rights activists who cite that dogs are at risk of physical injury including muscle strains and tears, allegations of doping the dogs or abusing them during training and that the sport may be used by some to prepare dogs for dog fighting.

== See also ==
- Championship (dog)
