= Dog anatomy =

Studies of the visible part of a canine

Dog anatomy comprises the anatomical study of the visible parts of the body of a domestic dog. Details of structures vary tremendously from breed to breed, more than in any other animal species, wild or domesticated, as dogs are highly variable in height and weight. The smallest known adult dog was a Yorkshire Terrier that stood only 6.3 cm (2.5 in) at the shoulder, 9.5 cm (3.7 in) in length along the head and body, and weighed only 113 grams (4.0 oz). The heaviest dog was an English Mastiff named Zorba, which weighed 314 pounds (142 kg). The tallest known adult dog is a Great Dane that stands 106.7 cm (42.0 in) at the shoulder.

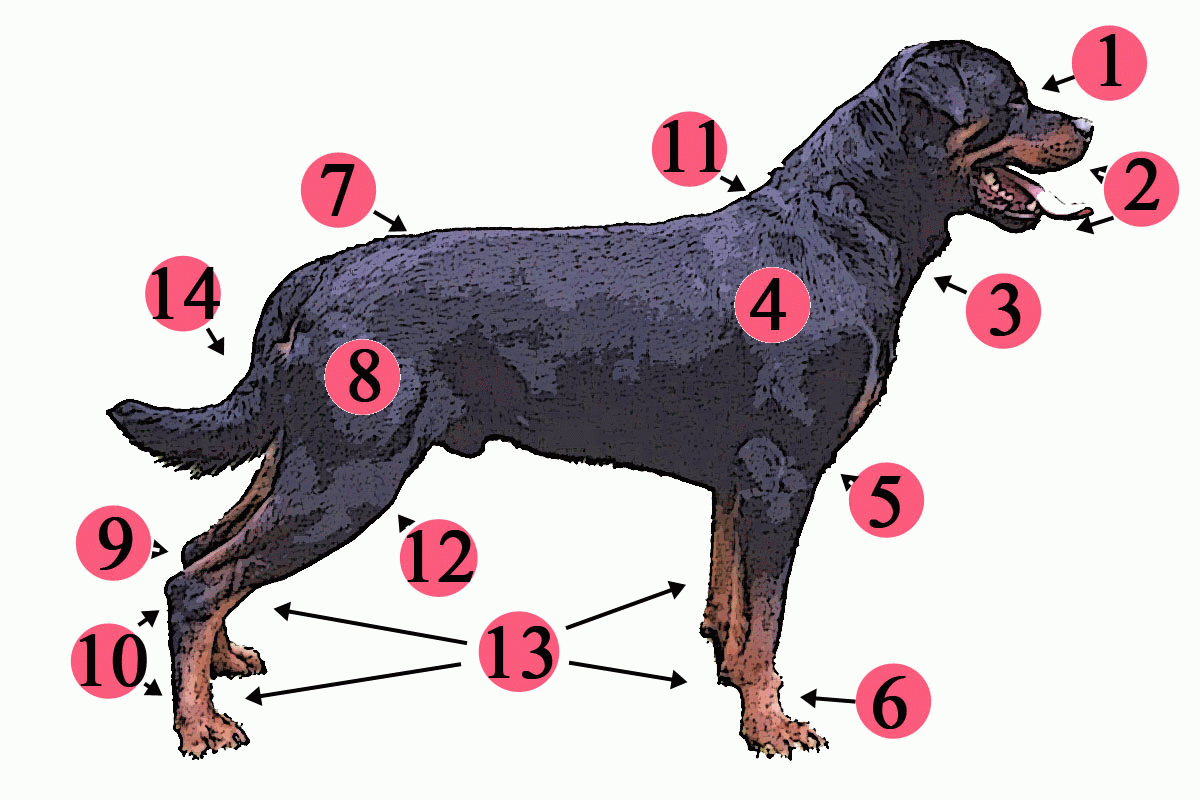
External anatomy (topography) of a typical dog: 1. Head 2. Muzzle 3. Dewlap (throat, neck skin) 4. Shoulder 5. Elbow 6. Forefeet 7. Croup (rump) 8. Leg (thigh and hip) 9. Hock 10. Hind feet 11. Withers 12. Stifle 13. Paws 14. Tail

== Anatomy ==
=== Muscles ===
The following table lists the limb muscles of the dog.

| Muscle | Location | Origin | Insertion | Nerve | Action |
|---|---|---|---|---|---|
| Descending superficial pectoral | chest and shoulders | first sternebra | greater tubercle of the humerus | cranial pectoral nerves | adducts the forelimb |
| Transverse superficial pectoral | chest and shoulders | second and third sternebrae | greater tubercle of the humerus | cranial pectoral nerves | adducts the forelimb |
| Deep pectoral | chest and shoulder | ventral sternum | lesser tubercle of the humerus | caudal pectoral nerves | extends the shoulder joint |
| Sternocephalicus | chest and neck | sternum | temporal bone | accessory nerve | turns the head and neck |
| Sternohyoideus | anterior chest | Sternum | Basihyoid bone | ventral branches of the cervical spinal nerves | moves the tongue caudally |
| Sternothyoideus | neck | first costal cartilage | thyroid cartilage | ventral branches of the cervical spinal nerves | moves the tongue caudally |
| Omotransversarius | anterior back and neck | spine of the scapula | wing of the atlas | accessory nerve | advances the forelimb and flexes the neck |
| Trapezius | anterior back midline | supraspinous ligament | spine of the scapula | accessory nerve | elevates and abducts the forelimb |
| Rhomboideus | back of the neck to the shoulders | nuchal crest of the occipital bone | scapula | ventral branches of the spinal nerves | elevates the forelimb |
| Latissimus dorsi | back and shoulder | thoracolumbar fascia | teres major tuberosity of the humerus | thoracodorsal nerve | flexes the shoulder joint |
| Serratus ventralis | back of the neck to shoulders | transverse processes of the C3 to C7 vertebrae | scapula | ventral branches of the cervical spinal nerves | support the trunk and depress the scapula |
| Deltoideus | shoulder | acromial process of the scapula | deltoid tuberosity | axillary nerve | flexes the shoulder |
| Infraspinatus | shoulder | infraspinatus fossa | greater tubercle of the humerus | suprascapular nerve | extends and flexes the shoulder joint |
| Teres minor | shoulder | infra glenoid tubercle of the scapula | teres minor tuberosity of the humerus | axillary nerve | flexes the shoulder and rotates the forelimb laterally |
| Supraspinatus | shoulder | supraspinous fossa of the scapula | greater tubercle of the humerus | suprascapular nerve | extends and stabilizes the shoulder joint |
| Subscapularis | shoulder | subscapular fossa | greater tubercle of the humerus | subscapular nerve | rotates the forelimb medially |
| Teres major | shoulder | scapula | teres major tuberosity of the humerus | axillary nerve | rotates the forelimb medially |
| Coracobrachialis | shoulder | coracoid process of the scapula | crest of the lesser tubercle of the humerus | musculocutaneous nerve | adducts, extends, and stabilizes the shoulder |
| Tensor fasciae antebrachium | upper forelimb | fascia covering the latissimus dorsi | olecranon | radial nerve | extends the elbow |
| Triceps brachii | upper forelimb | caudal border of the scapula | olecranon tuber | radial nerve | extends the elbow and flexes the shoulder |
| Anconeus | lower forelimb | humerus | proximal end of the ulna | radial nerve | extends the elbow |
| Biceps brachii | upper forelimb | supraglenoid tubercle | ulnar and radial tuberosities | musculocutaneous nerve | flexes the elbow and extends the shoulder |
| Brachialis | upper forelimb | lateral surface of the humerus | ulnar and radial tuberosities | musculocutaneous nerve | flexes the elbow |
| Extensor carpi radialis | lower forelimb | supracondylar crest | metacarpals | radial nerve | extends the carpus |
| Common digital extensor | lower forelimb, carpus | lateral epicondyle of the humerus | distal phalanges | radial nerve | extends the carpus and digits 3, 4, and 5 |
| Extensor carpi ulnar | lower forelimb | lateral epicondyle of the humerus | metacarpal 5 and the accessory carpal bone | radial nerve | abducts and extends the carpal joint |
| supinator | forelimb | lateral epicondyle of the humerus | radius | radial nerve | rotates the lower forelimb laterally |
| Abductor pollicis longus | lower forelimb | ulna | metacarpal 1 | radial nerve | abducts digit 1 and extends the carpal joint |
| pronator teres | lower forelimb | medial epicondyle of the humerus | medial border of the radius | median nerve | rotate lower forelimb medially and flex the elbow |
| Flexor carpi radialis | lower forelimb | medial epicondyle of the humerus | palmar side of metacarpals 2 and 3 | median nerve | flexes the carpus |
| Superficial digital flexor | lower forelimb | medial epicondyle of the humerus | palmar surface of the middle phalanges | median nerve | flexes the carpus and the metacarpophalangeal and proximal interphalangeal joints |
| Flexor carpi ulnar | lower forelimb | olecranon | accessory carpal bone | ulnar nerve | flexes the carpus |
| Deep digital flexor | lower forelimb | medial epicondyle of the humerus | palmar surface of the distal phalanges | median nerve | flexes the carpus, metacarpophalangeal joints, and interphalangeal joints |
| Pronator quadratus | lower forelimb | radius and ulna | ? | median nerve | pronates the paw |
| Biceps femoris | upper hindlimb | ischiatic tuberosity | patellar ligament | sciatic nerve | extends the hip, stifle, and hock |
| Semitendinosus | hindlimb | ischiatic tuberosity | tibia | sciatic nerve | extends the hip and hock, flexes the stifle |
| Semimembranosus | hindlimb | ischiatic tuberosity | femur and tibia | sciatic nerve | extends the hip and stifle |
| Sartorius | hindlimb | ilium | patella and tibia | femoral nerve | flexes the hip and both flexes and extends the stifle |
| Gracilis | hindlimb | pelvic symphysis | cranial border of the tibia | obturator nerve | adducts the hindlimb, flexes the stifle and extends the hip and hock |
| Pectineus | upper hindlimb | iliopubic eminence | caudal femur | obturator nerve | adducts the hindlimb |
| Adductor | upper hindlimb | pelvic symphysis | lateral femur | obturator nerve | adducts the hindlimb and extends the hip |
| Tensor fasciae latae | upper hindlimb | tuber coxae of the ilium | lateral femoral fascia | cranial gluteal nerve | flexes the hip and extends the stifle |
| Superficial gluteal | hips | lateral border of the sacrum | third trochanter | caudal gluteal nerve | extends the hip and abducts the hindlimb |
| Middle gluteal | hips | ilium | greater trochanter | cranial gluteal nerve | abducts the hip and rotates the hindlimb medially |
| Deep gluteal | hips | ischiatic spine | greater trochanter | cranial gluteal nerve | extends the hip and rotates the hindlimb medially |
| Internal obturator | hips | pelvic symphysis | trochanteric fossa of the femur | sciatic nerve | rotates the hindlimb laterally |
| Gamelli | hips | lateral surface of the ischium | trochanteric fossa | sciatic nerve | rotates the hindlimb laterally |
| Quadratus femoris | hips | ischium | intertrochanteric crest | ? | extends the hip and rotate the hindlimb laterally |
| External obturator | hips | pubis and ischium | condyloid process of mandible | obturator nerve | rotates the hindlimb laterally |
| Quadriceps femoris | upper hindlimb | femur and ilium | tibial tuberosity | femoral nerve | extends the stifle and flexes the hip |
| Ilipsoas | upper hindlimb | ilium | lesser trochanter | femoral nerve | flexes the hip |
| Cranial tibial | lower hindlimb | tibia | plantar surfaces of metatarsals 1 and 2 | peroneal nerve | flexes the tarsus and rotates the paw laterally |
| Popliteus | lower hindlimb | lateral condyle of the femur | tibia | tibial nerve | rotates the leg medially |
| Long digital extensor | lower hindlimb | extensor fossa of the femur | extensor processes of the distal phalanges | peroneal nerve | extends the toes and flexes the tarsus |
| Peroneus longus | lower hindlimb | tibia and fibula | fourth tarsal bone and the plantar aspect of the metatarsals | peroneal nerve | flexes the tarsus and rotates the paw medially |
| Gastrocnemius | lower hindlimb | supracondylar tuberosities of the femur | tuber calcanei | tibial nerve | extends the tarsus and flexes the stifle |
| Superficial digital flexor | lower hindlimb | lateral supracondylar tuberosity of the femur | tuber calcanei and bases of the middle phalanges | tibial nerve | extends the tarsus and flexes the stifle |
| Deep digital flexor | lower hindlimb | Fibula | plantar surface of the distal phalanges | tibial nerve | extends the tarsus and flexes the toes |

=== Skeleton ===
Skeleton of a dog: 1. Cranium 2. Maxilla 3. Mandible 4. Atlas 5. Axis 6. Scapula 7. Spine of scapula 8. Humerus 9. Radius 10. Ulna 11. Phalanges 12. Metacarpal bones 13. Carpal bones 14. Sternum 15. Cartilaginous part of the rib 16. Ribs 17. Phalanges 18. Metatarsal bones 19. Tarsal Bones 20. Calcaneus 21. Fibula 22. Tibia 23. Patella 24. Femur 25. Ischium 26. Pelvis

The vertebrae have muscles attached to the pedicles, the laminae, the spinous, transverse, and articular processes, the vertebral and intervertebral foramina, the atlas (C1), axis (C2), dens, and ventral lamina (C6).

Dog skeletal features

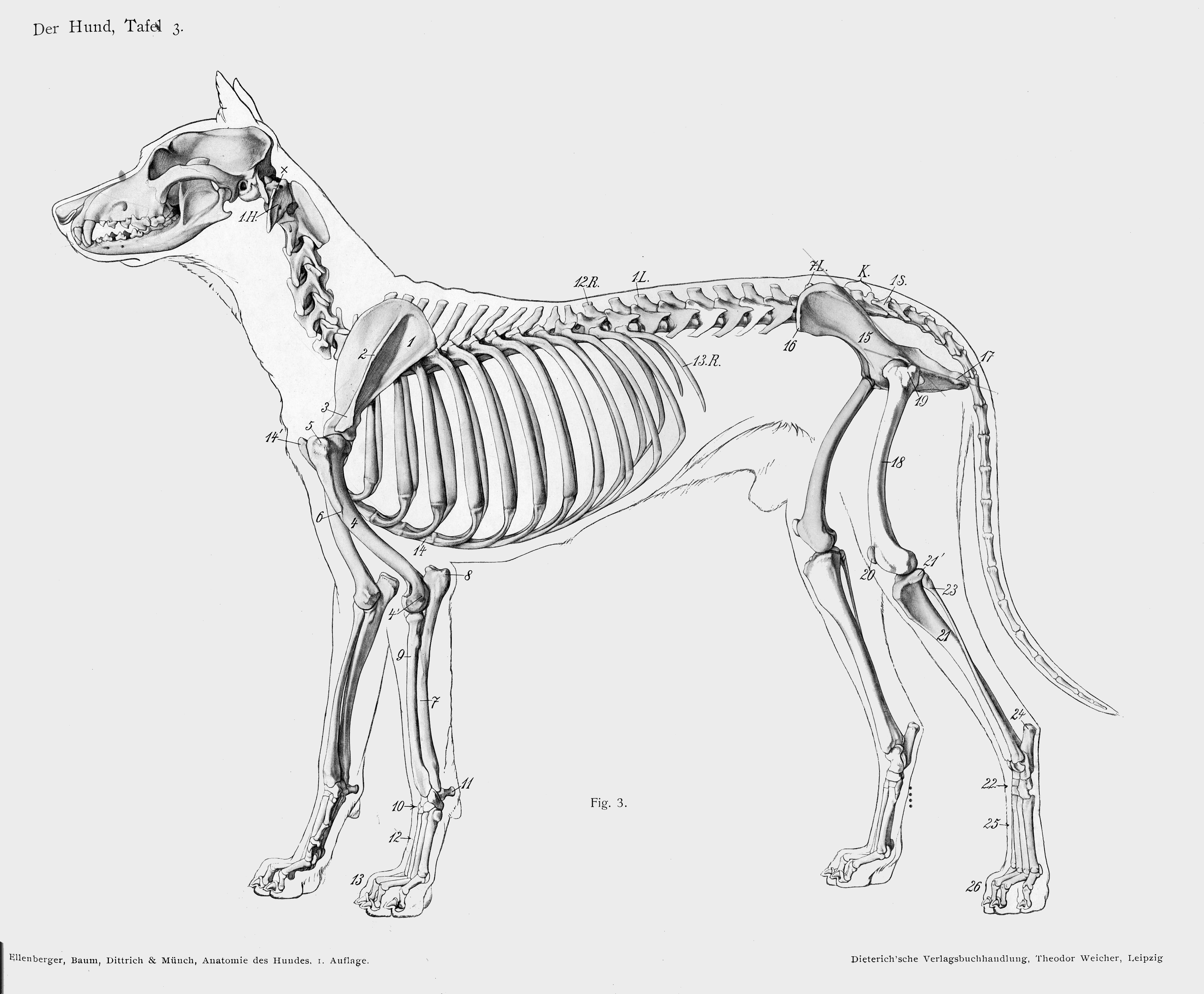
Lateral view of a dog skeleton

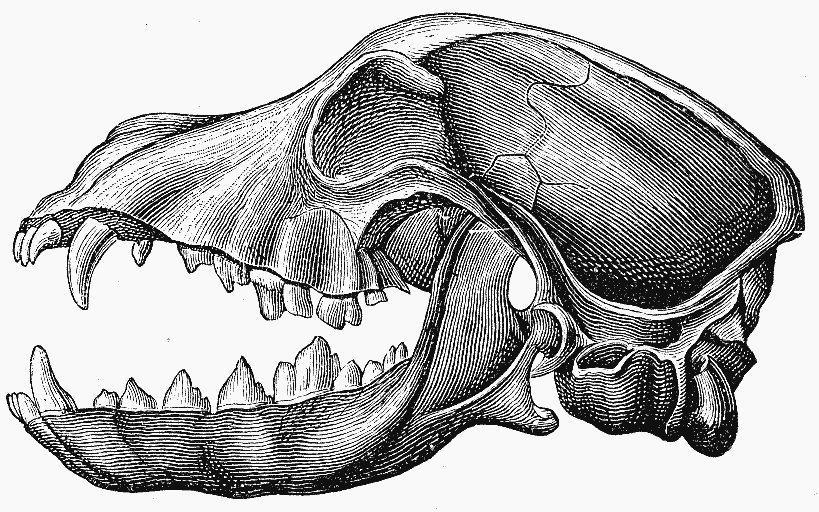
Lateral view of a dog skull, jaw opened

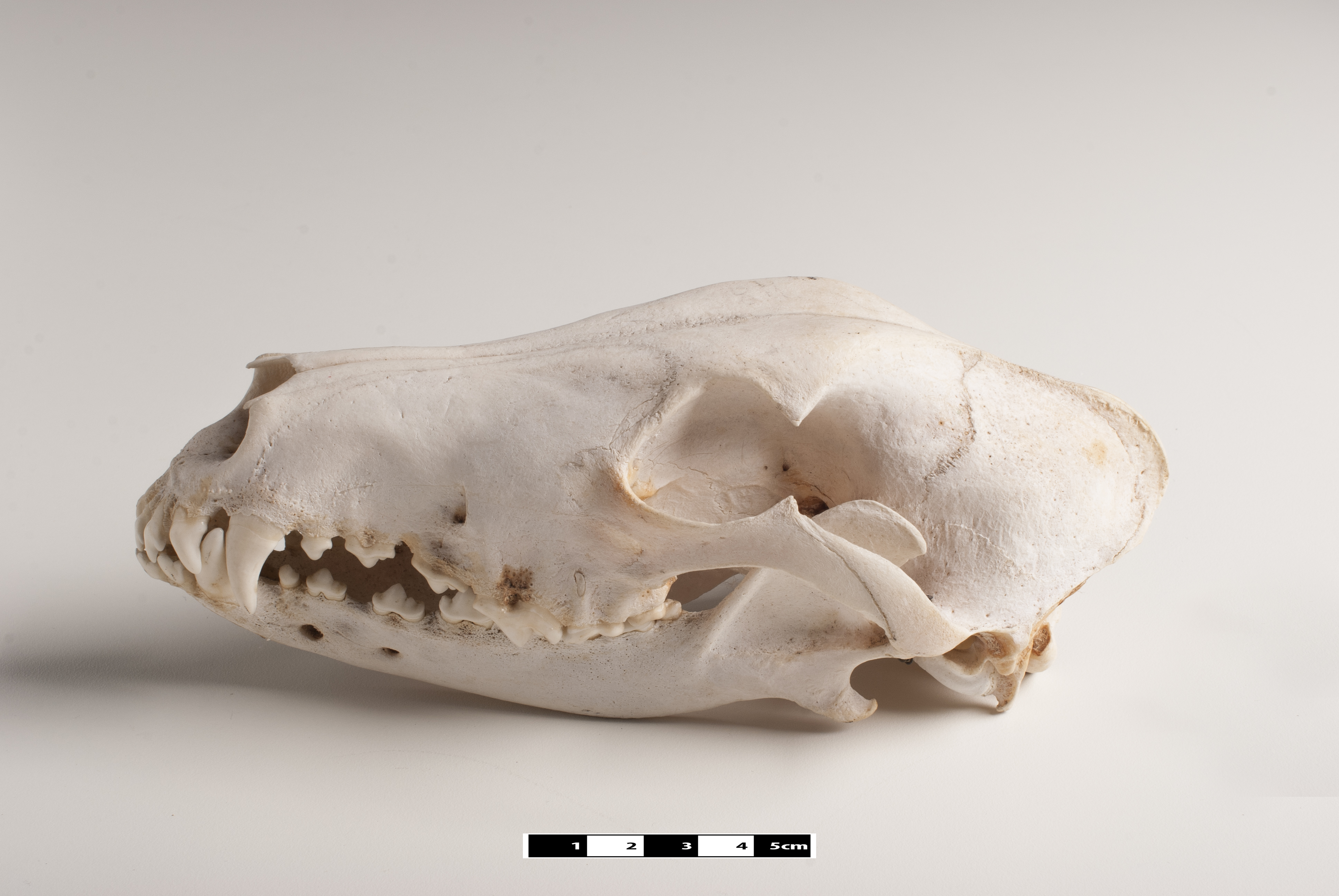
Lateral view of a dog skull, jaw closed

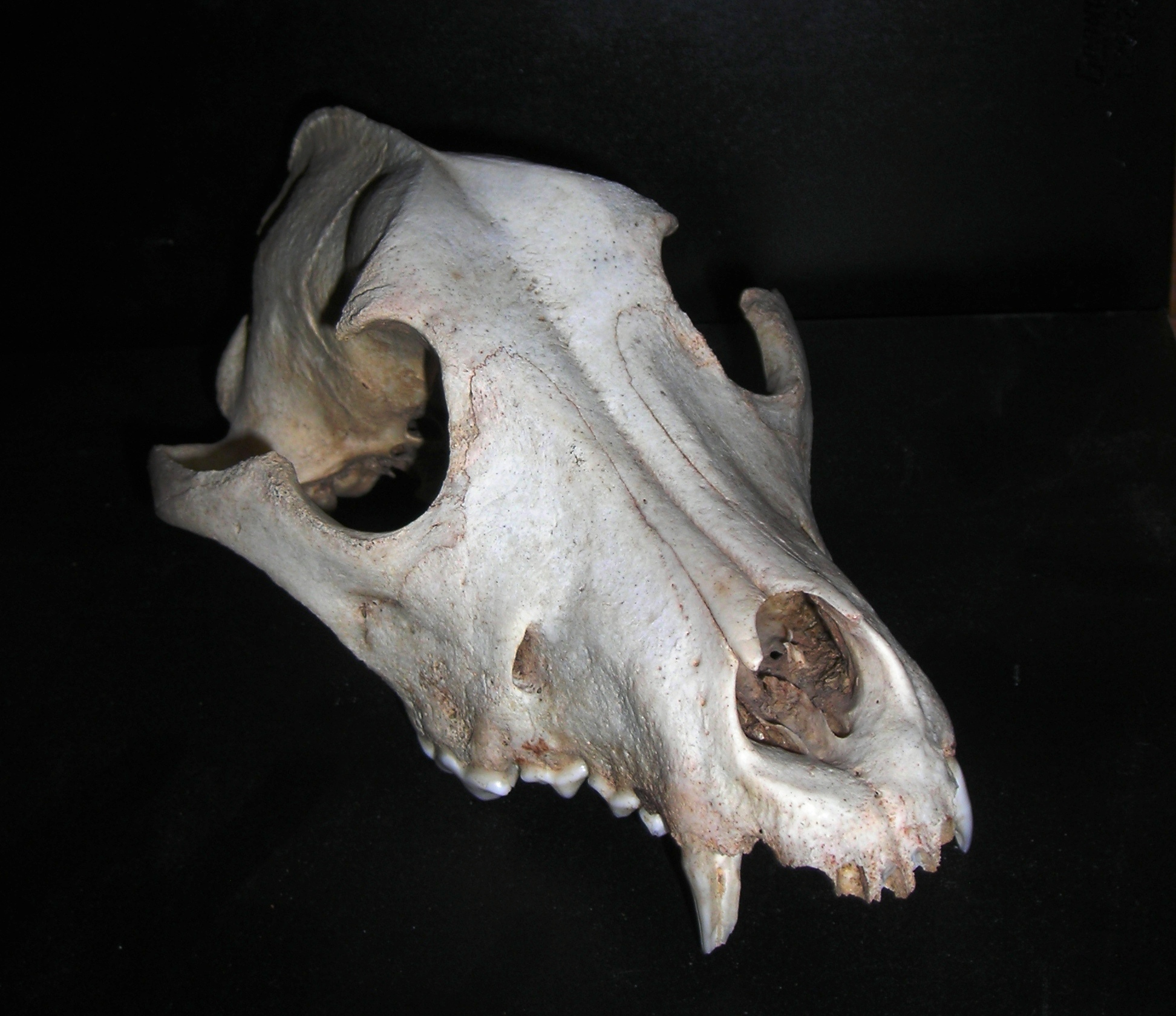
Frontal view of a dog skull

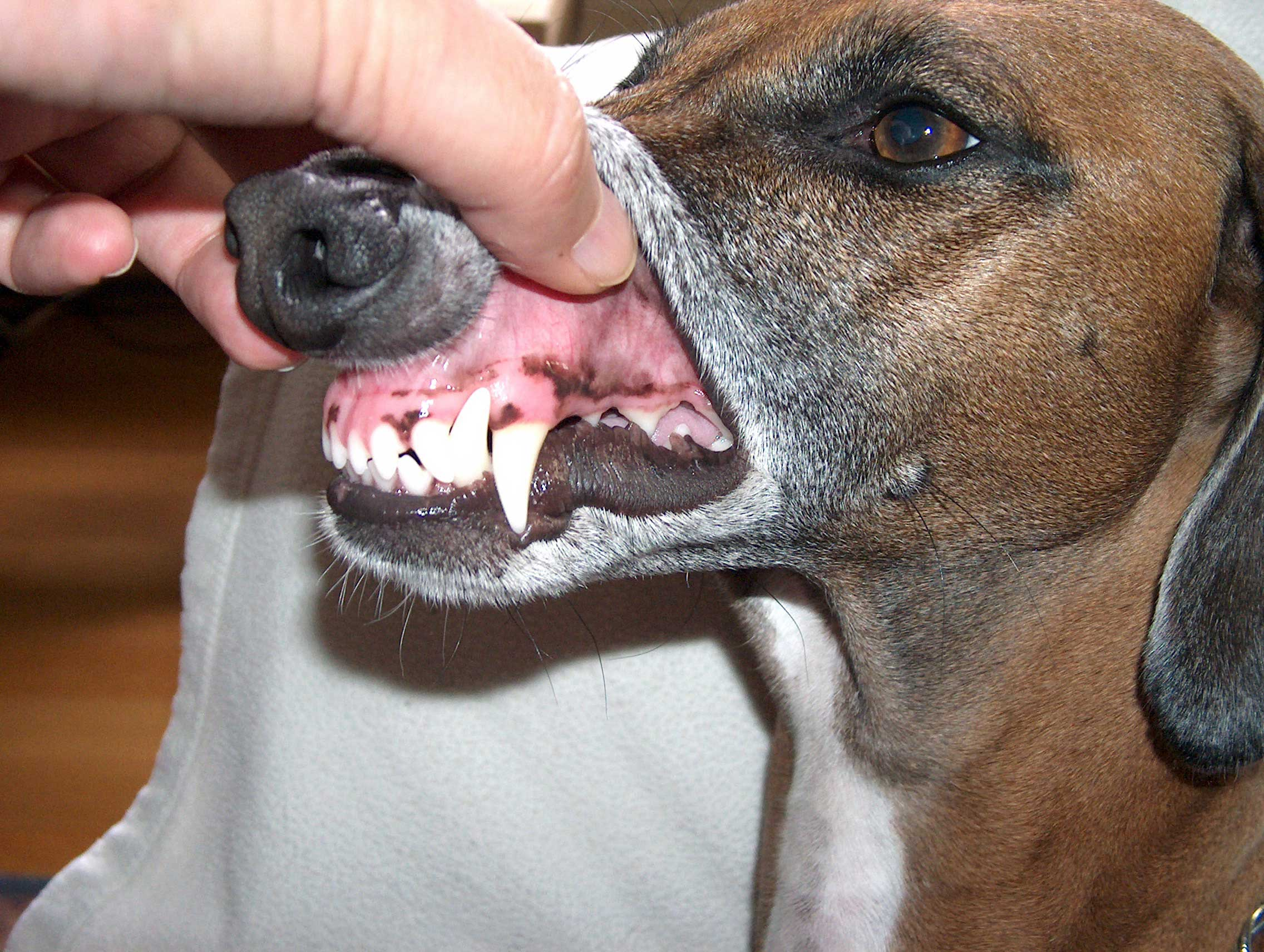
A dog's teeth

=== Skull ===
In 1986, a study of skull morphology found that the domestic dog is morphologically distinct from all other canids except the wolf-like canids. The difference in size and proportion between some breeds are as great as those between any wild genera, but all dogs are clearly members of the same species. In 2010, a study of dog skull shape compared to extant carnivorans proposed that "The greatest shape distances between dog breeds clearly surpass the maximum divergence between species in the Carnivora. Moreover, domestic dogs occupy a range of novel shapes outside the domain of wild carnivorans."

The domestic dog compared to the wolf shows the greatest variation in the size and shape of the skull (Evans 1979) that ranges from 7 to 28 cm in length (McGreevy 2004). Wolves are dolichocephalic (long-skulled) but not as extreme as some breeds of dogs, such as greyhounds and Russian Wolfhounds (McGreevy 2004). Canine brachycephaly (short-skulledness) is found only in domestic dogs and is related to paedomorphosis (Goodwin 1997). Puppies are born with short snouts, with the longer skull of dolichocephalic dogs emerging in later development (Coppinger 1995). Other differences in head shape between brachycephalic and dolichocephalic dogs include changes in the craniofacial angle (angle between the basilar axis and hard palate) (Regodón 1993), morphology of the temporomandibular joint (Dickie 2001), and radiographic anatomy of the cribriform plate (Schwarz 2000).

One study found that the relative reduction in dog skull length compared to its width (the cephalic index) was significantly correlated to both the position and the angle of the brain within the skull, regardless of the brain size or the body weight of the dog.

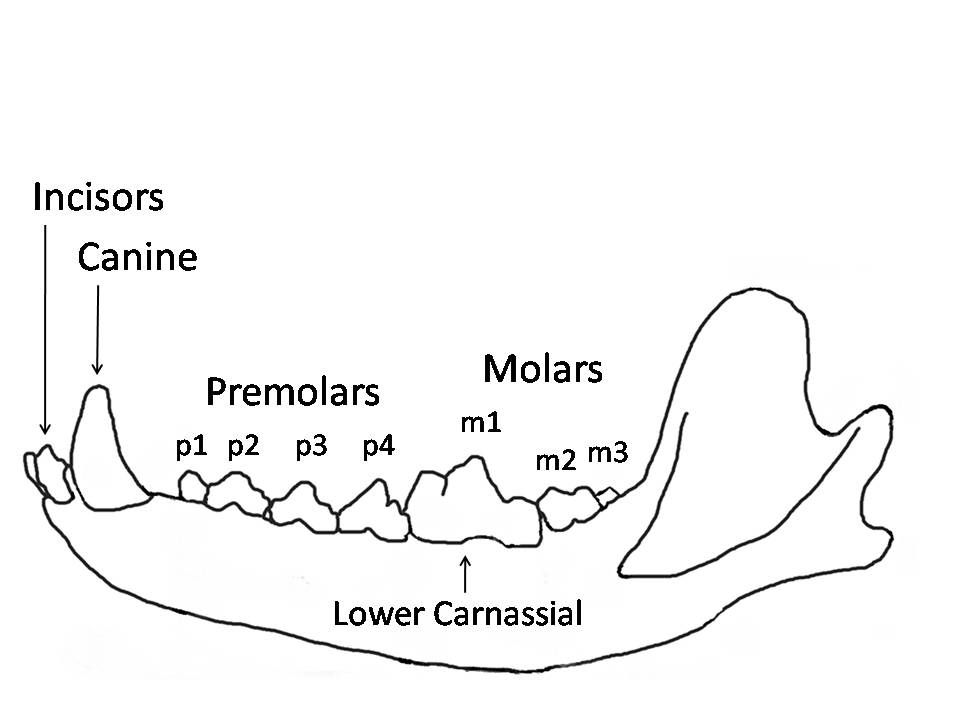
A wolf mandible diagram showing the names and positions of the teeth

Bite force adjusted for body weight in Newtons per kilogram
| Canid | Carnassial | Canine |
|---|---|---|
| Wolf | 131.6 | 127.3 |
| Dhole | 130.7 | 132.0 |
| African wild dog | 127.7 | 131.1 |
| Greenland Dog (domesticated) | 117.4 | 114.3 |
| Coyote | 107.2 | 98.9 |
| Side-striped jackal | 93.0 | 87.5 |
| Golden jackal | 89.6 | 87.7 |
| Black-backed jackal | 80.6 | 78.3 |

=== Respiratory system ===
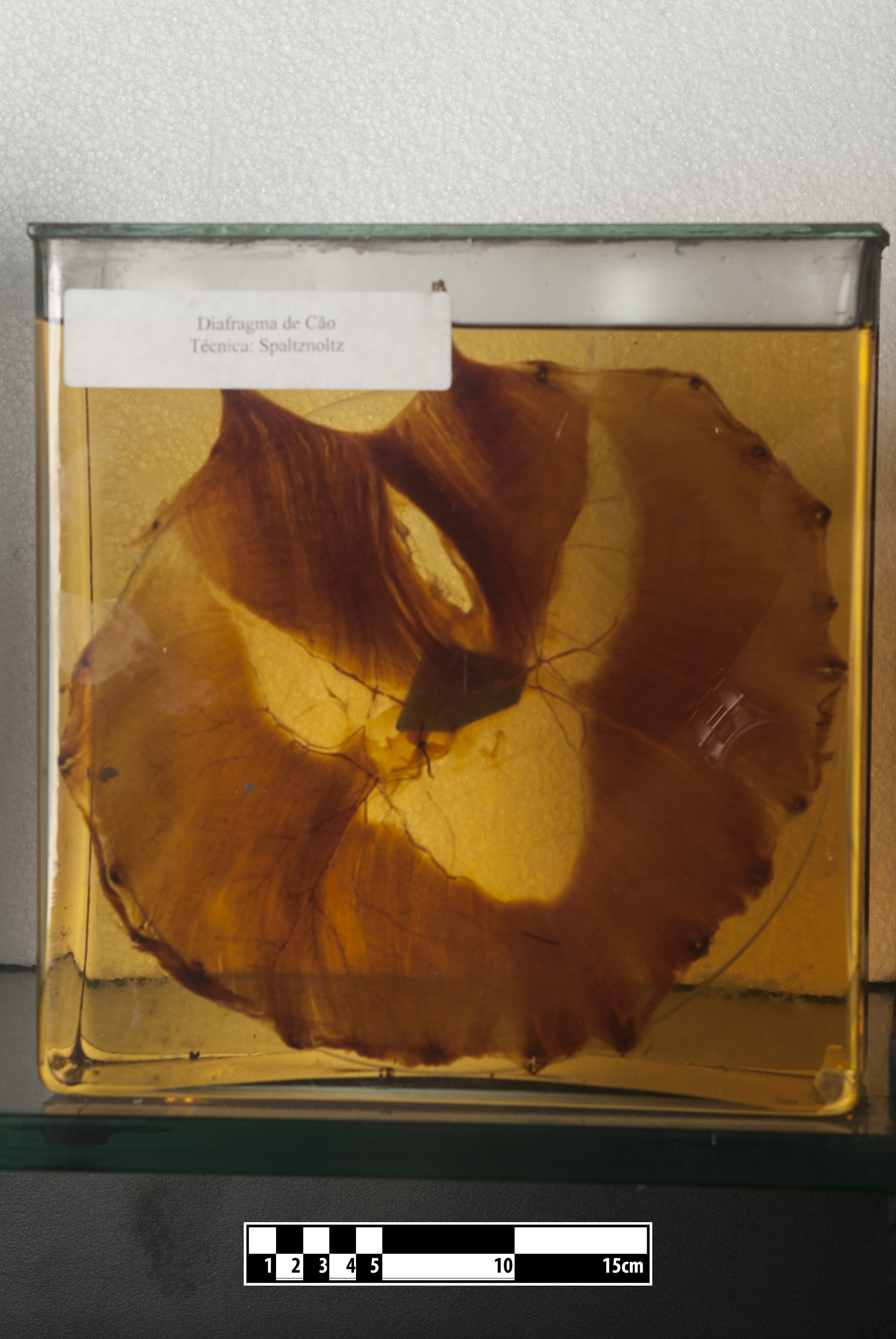
Dog diaphragm

The respiratory system is the set of organs responsible for the intake of oxygen and the expelling of carbon dioxide. As dogs have few sweat glands in their skin, the respiratory system also plays an important role in body thermoregulation.

Dogs are mammals with two large lungs that are further divided into lobes. They have a spongy appearance due to the presence of a system of delicate branches of the bronchioles in each lung, ending in closed, thin-walled chambers (the points of gas exchange) called alveoli. The presence of a muscular structure, the diaphragm, exclusive to mammals, divides the peritoneal cavity from the pleural cavity, besides assisting the lungs during inhalation.

Inbreeding dogs can cause brachycephalic airway syndrome. The dog's face can have a shortened skull, facial and nasal bones, stenotic nares, a hypoplastic trachea, and everted laryngeal saccules.

=== Digestive system ===
The organs that make up the canine digestive system are the same as those in most other mammals, including a mouth, esophagus, stomach, small and large intestines, rectum, anus, liver, and pancreas.

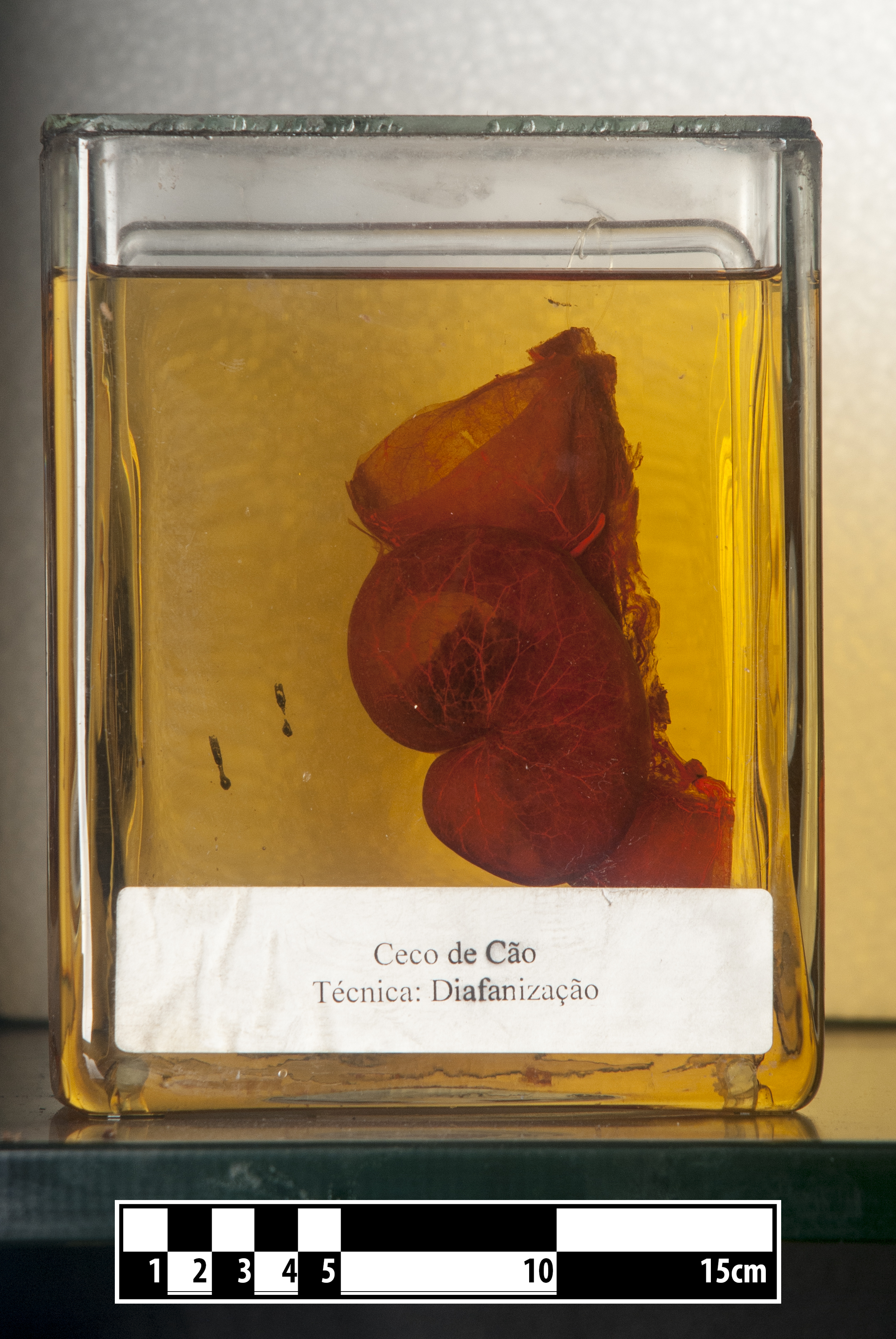
Dog cecum

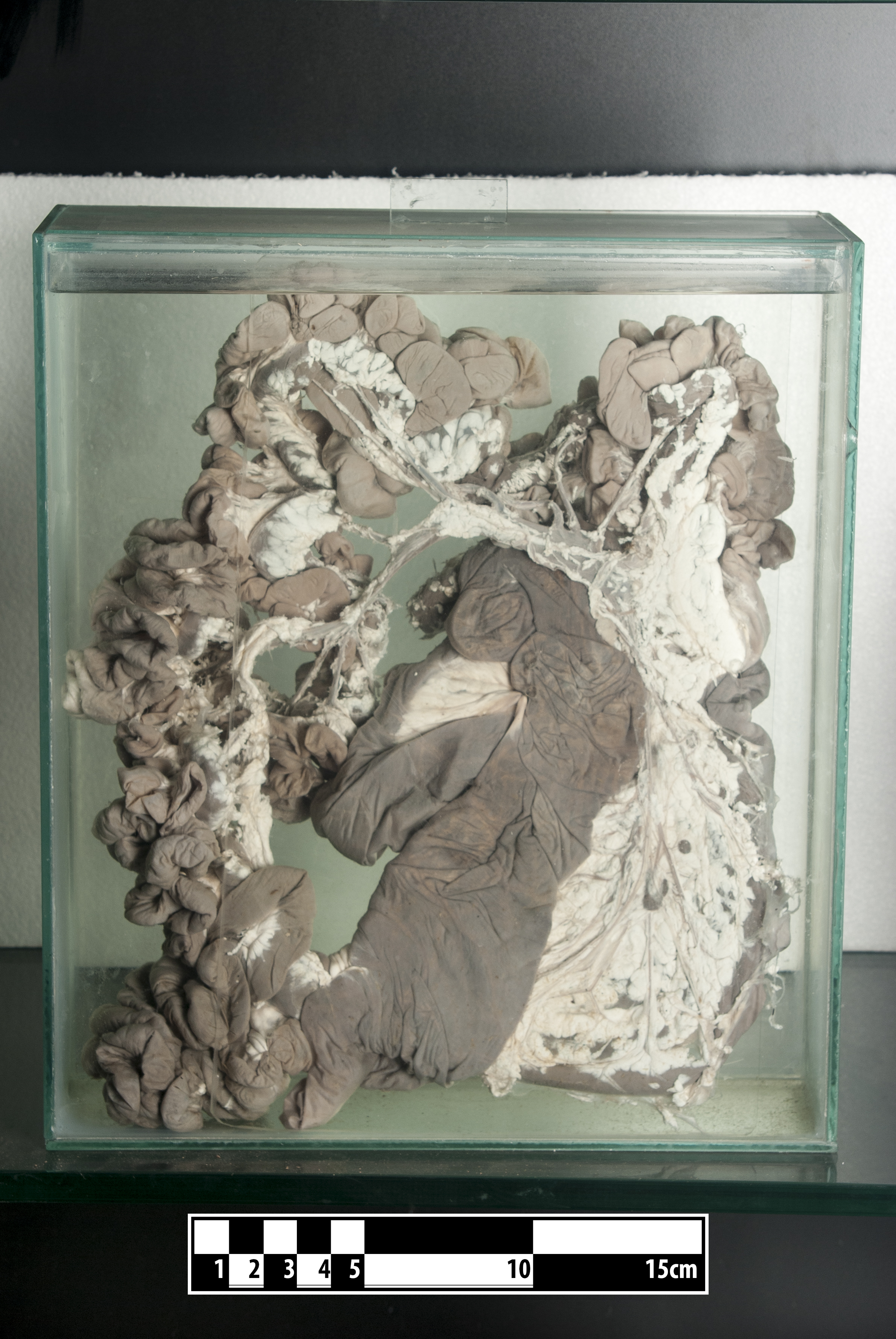
Dog digestive tract

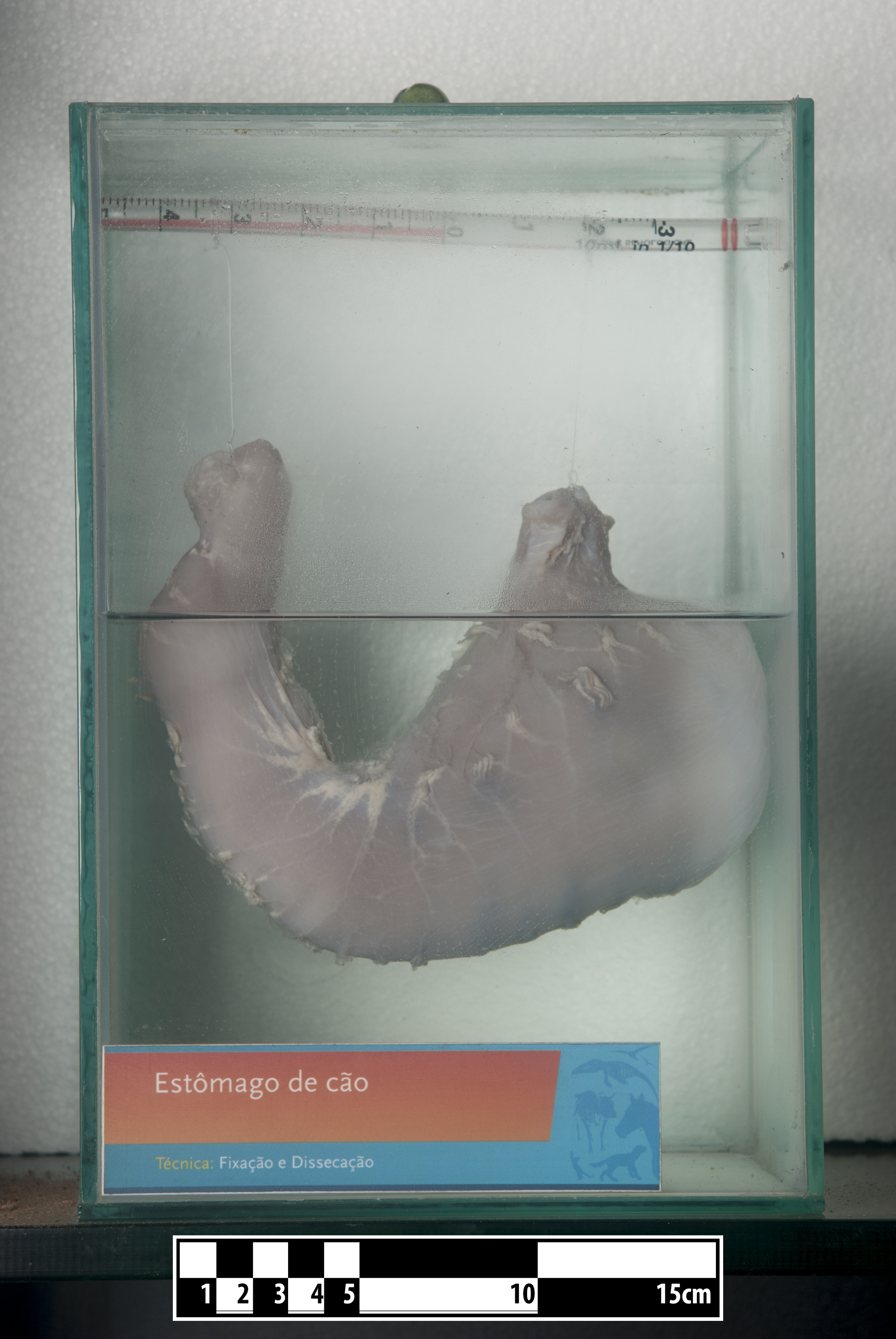
Dog stomach

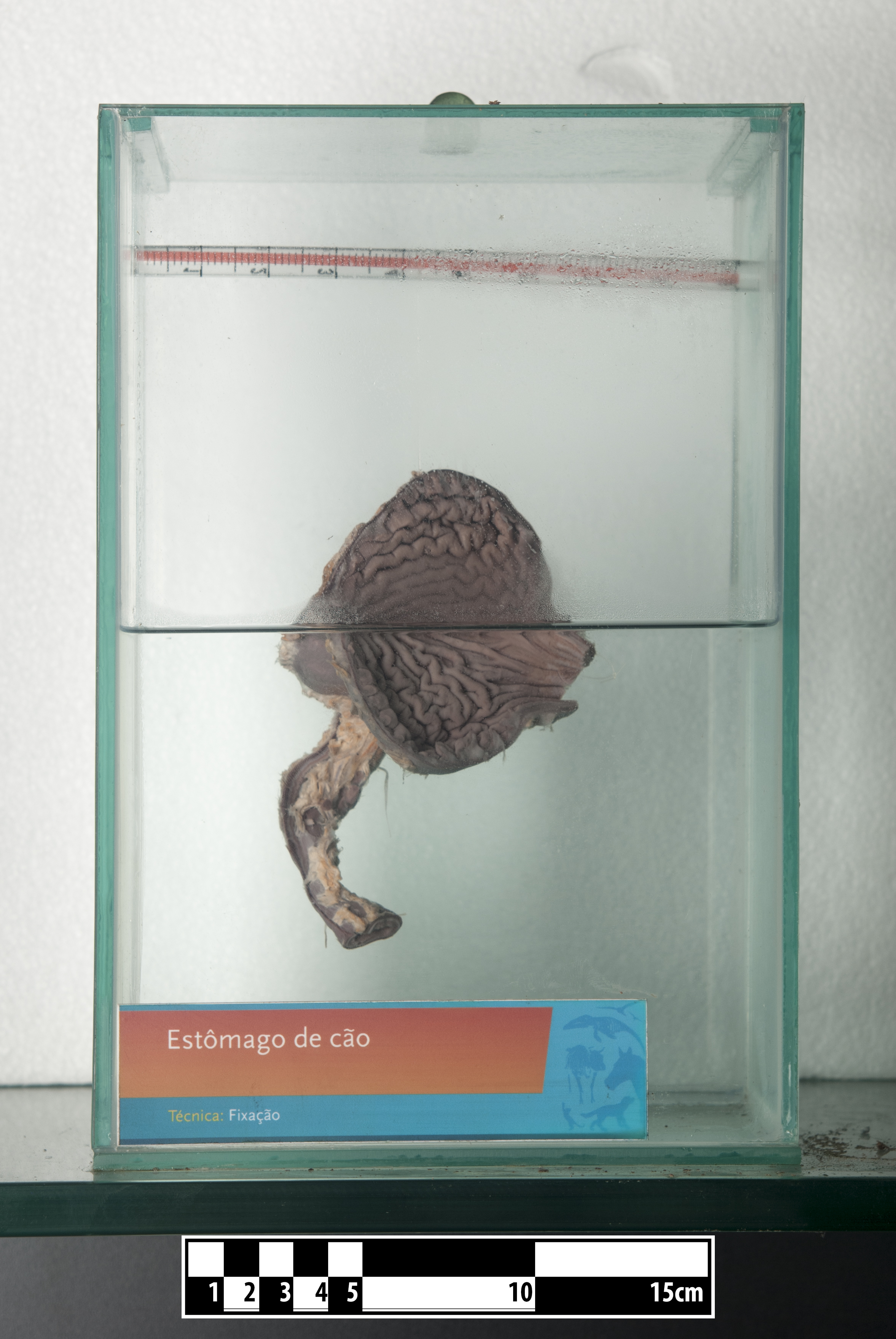
Dog stomach (open, inner view)

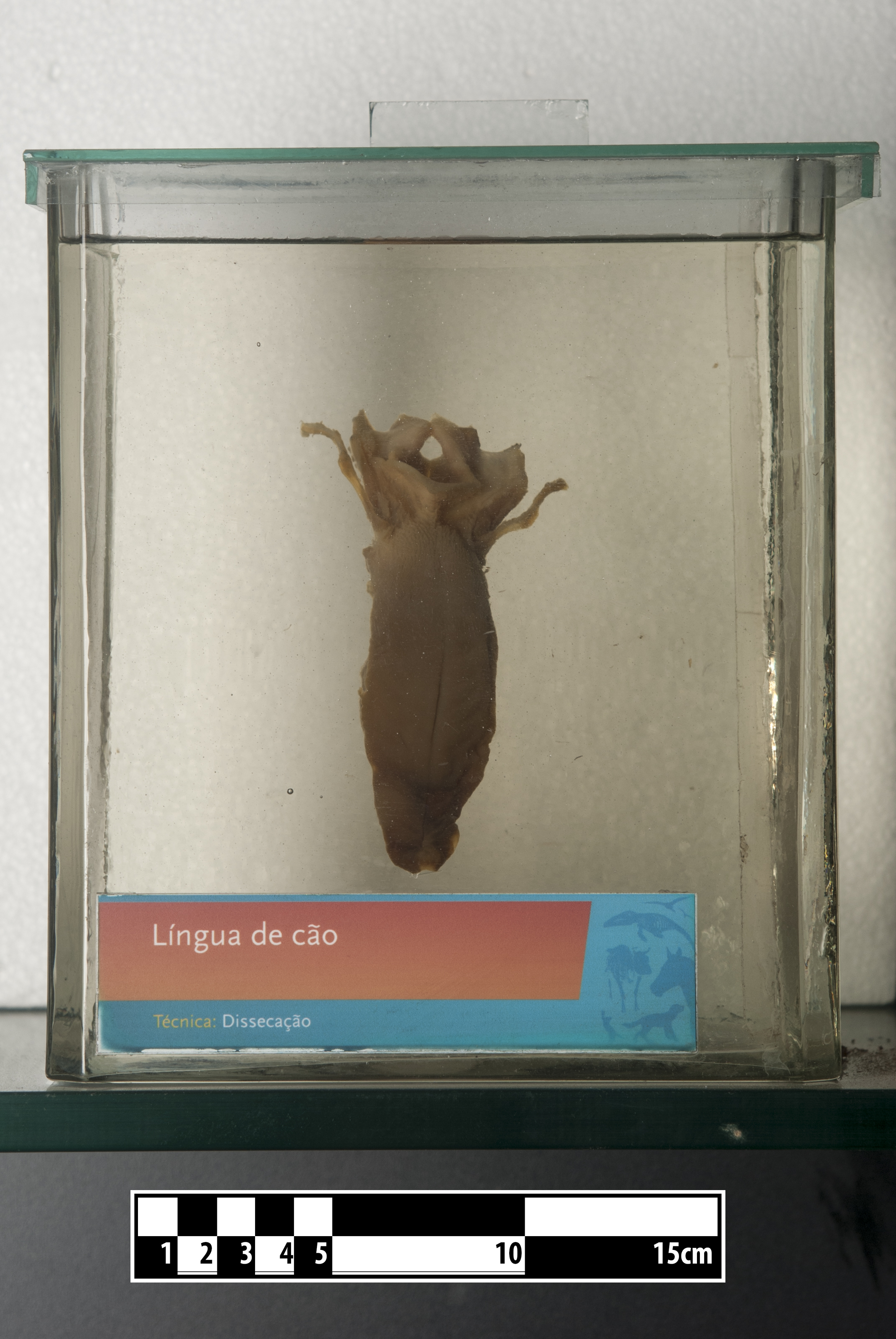
Formalin fixed dog tongue

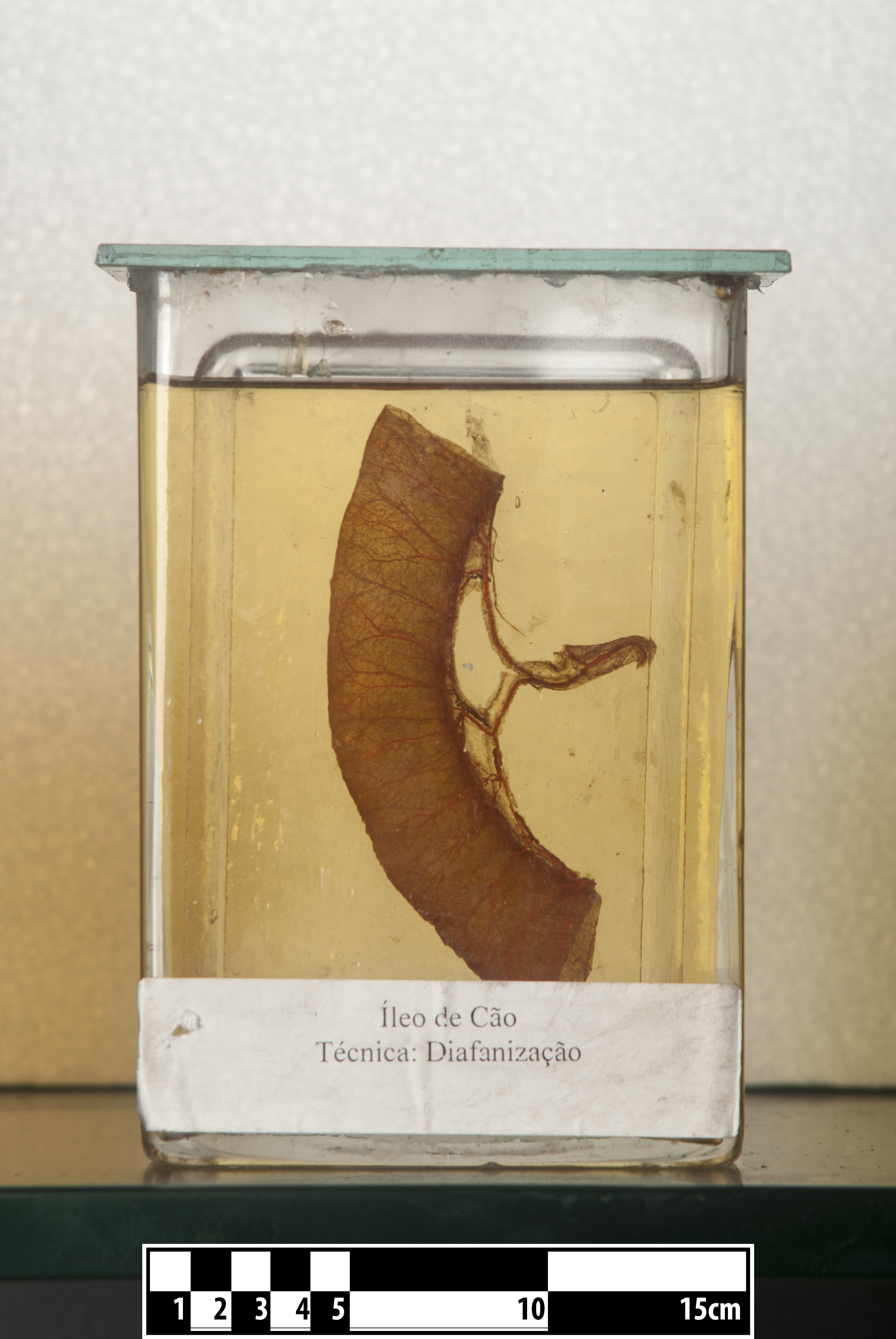
Segment of dog ileum

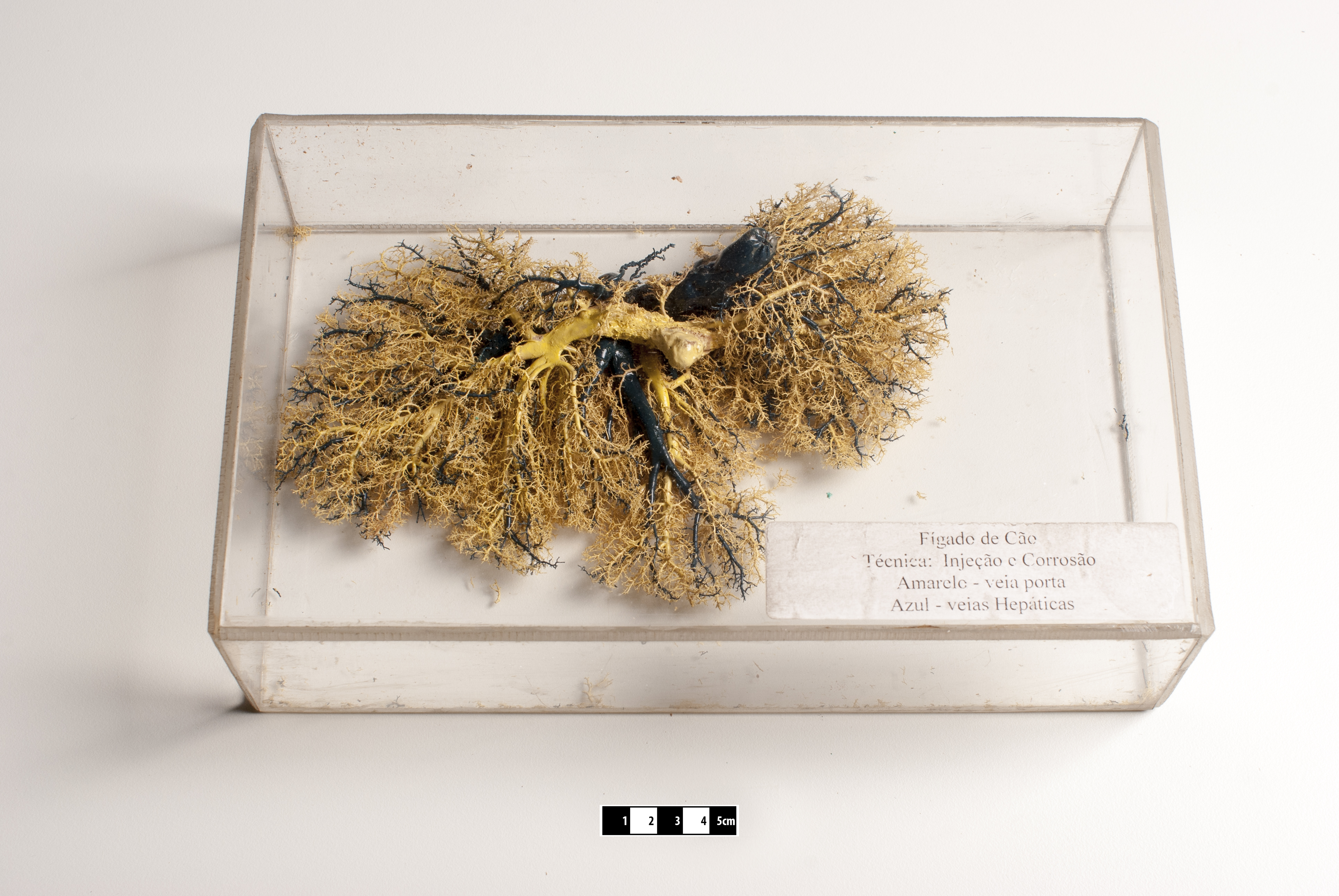
Vascular structure of the dog liver

== Physical characteristics ==
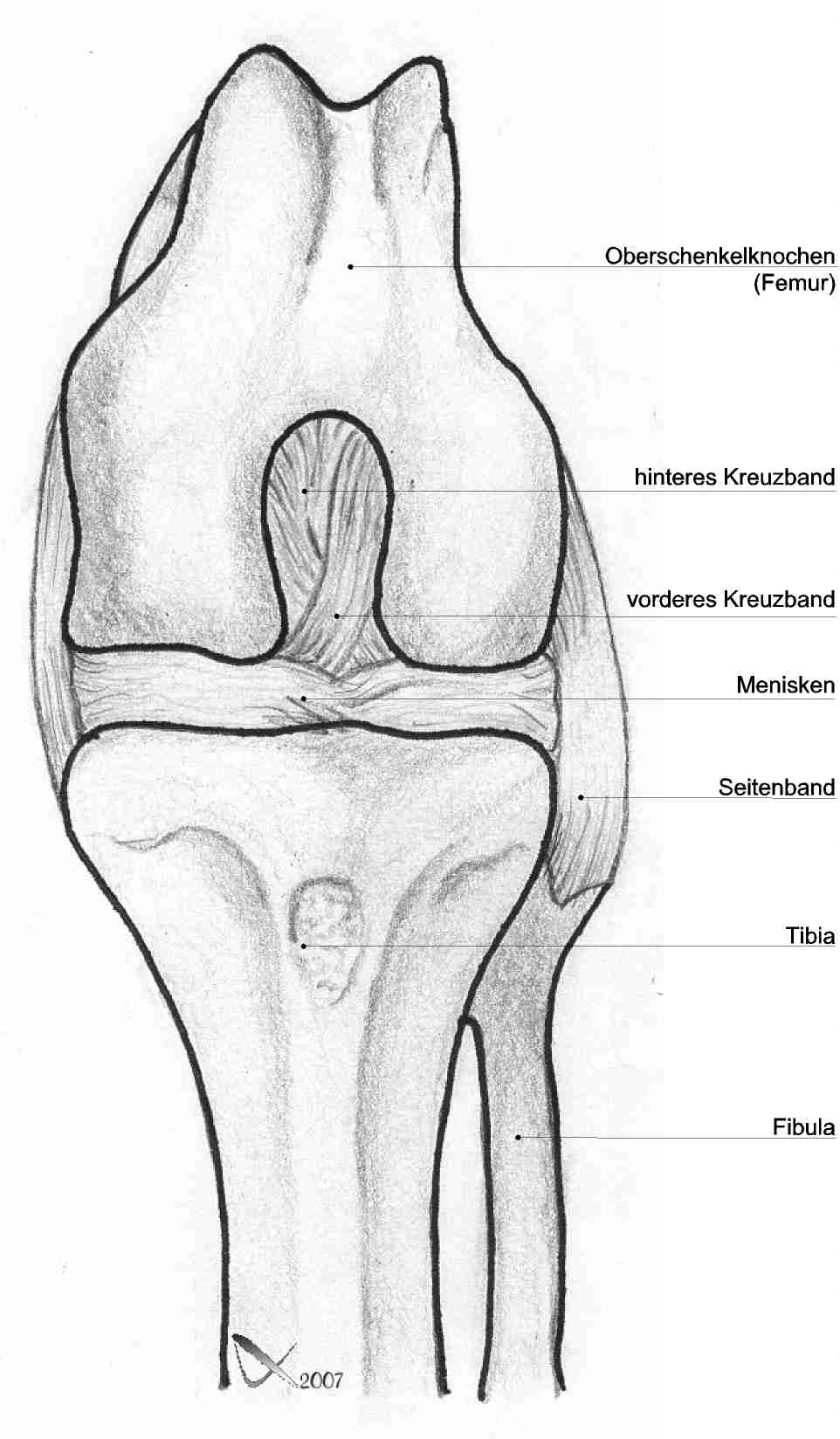
Dog knee

Sixty percent of the dog's body mass falls on the front legs.

The dog has a cardiovascular system. The dog's muscles provide the dog with the ability to jump and leap. Their legs can propel them to leap forward rapidly to chase and overcome prey. They have small, tight feet and walk on their toes (thus having a digitigrade stance and locomotion). Their rear legs are fairly rigid and sturdy. The front legs are loose and flexible, with only muscle attaching them to the torso.

The dog's muzzle size will vary with the breed. Dogs with medium muzzles, such as the German Shepherd, are called mesocephalic and dogs with a pushed in muzzle, such as the Pug, are called brachycephalic. Today's toy breeds have skeletons that mature in only a few months, while giant breeds, such as the Mastiffs, take 16 to 18 months for the skeleton to mature. Dwarfism has affected the proportions of some breeds' skeletons, as in the Basset Hound.

All living Canidae have a ligament connecting the spinous process of their first thoracic (or chest) vertebra to the back of the axis bone (second cervical or neck bone), which supports the weight of the head without active muscle exertion, thus saving energy. This ligament is analogous in function (but different in exact structural detail) to the nuchal ligament found in ungulates. This ligament allows dogs to carry their heads while running long distances, such as while following scent trails with their nose to the ground, without expending much energy.

Dogs have disconnected shoulder bones (lacking the collar bone of the human skeleton) that allow a greater stride length for running and leaping. They walk on four toes, front and back, and have vestigial dewclaws on their front legs and on their rear legs. When a dog has extra dewclaws in addition to the usual one in the rear, the dog is said to be "double dewclawed."

=== Size ===
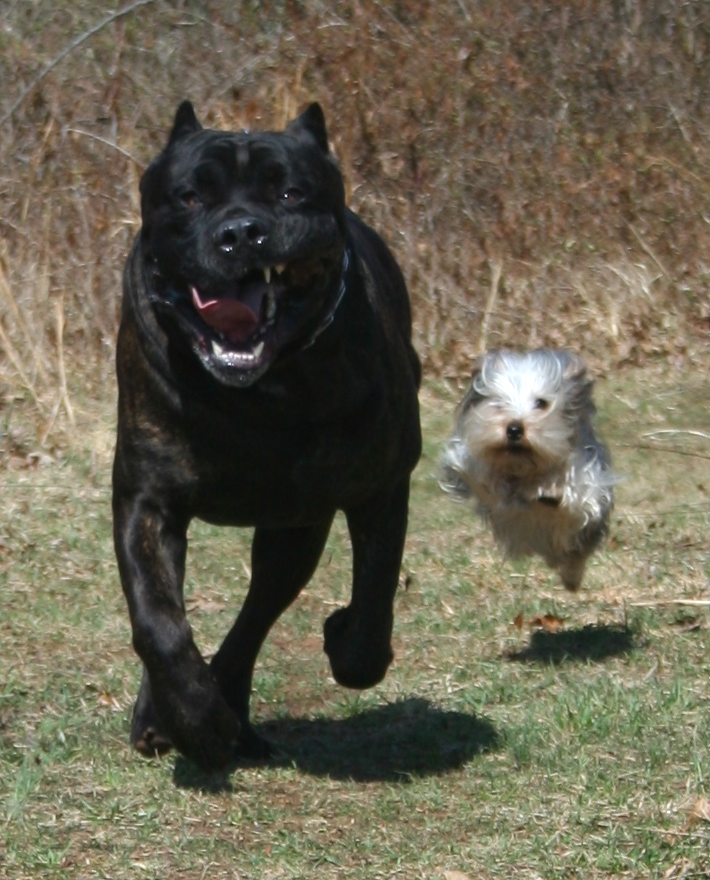
The difference in body size between a Cane Corso (Italian Mastiff) and a Yorkshire Terrier is over 30-fold; both are members of the same species.

Dogs are highly variable in height and weight. The smallest known adult dog was a Yorkshire Terrier that stood only 6.3 cm (2.5 in) at the shoulder, 9.5 cm (3.7 in) in length along the head and body, and weighed only 113 grams (4.0 oz). The largest known adult dog was an English Mastiff, which weighed 155.6 kg (343 lb). The tallest known adult dog is a Great Dane that stands 106.7 cm (42.0 in) at the shoulder.

In 2007, a study identified a gene that was proposed to be responsible for dog size. The study found a regulatory sequence next to the gene Insulin-like growth factor 1 (IGF1), which, together with the gene and regulatory sequence, "is a major contributor to body size in all small dogs." Two variants of this gene were found in large dogs, making a more complex reason for the large breed size. The researchers concluded that this gene's instructions to make dogs small must be at least 12,000 years old and it is not found in wolves. Another study has proposed that lap dogs (small dogs) are among the oldest existing dog types.

=== Coat ===
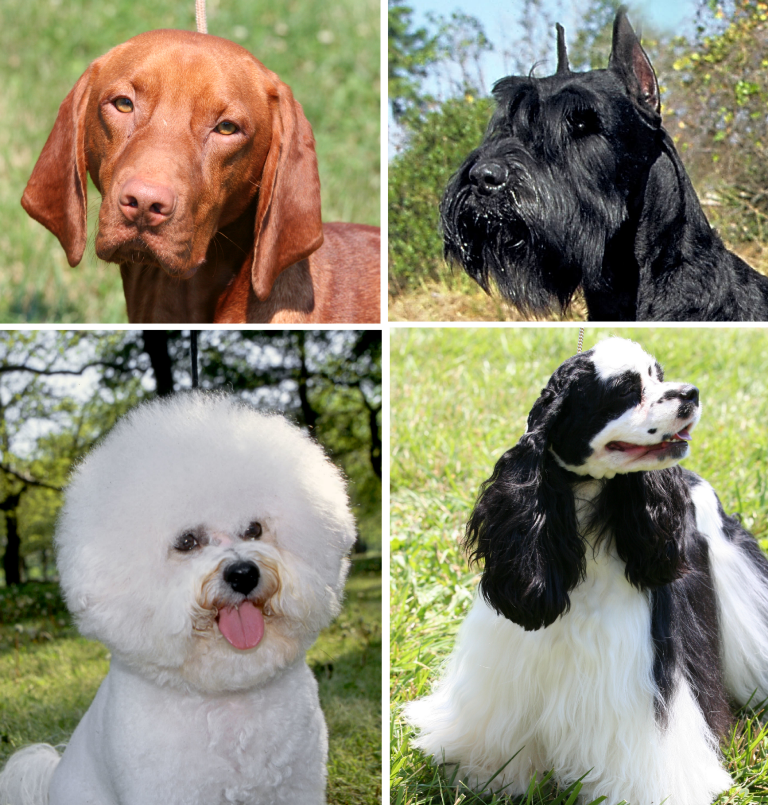
Montage showing the coat variation of dogs.

Domestic dogs often display the remnants of countershading, a common natural camouflage pattern. The general theory of countershading is that an animal that is lit from above will appear lighter on its upper half and darker on its lower half, where it will usually be in its own shade. This is a pattern that predators can learn to watch for. A counter-shaded animal will have dark coloring on its upper surfaces and light coloring below. This reduces the general visibility of the animal. In this pattern, many breeds will have the occasional "blaze", stripe, or "star" of white fur on their chests or undersides.

A study found that the genetic basis that explains coat colors in horse coats and cat coats did not apply to dog coats. The project took samples from 38 different breeds to find the gene (a beta defensin gene) responsible for dog coat color. One version produces yellow dogs and a mutation produces black dogs. All dog coat colors are modifications of black or yellow. For example, the white in white Miniature Schnauzer is a cream color, not albinism (a genotype of E/E' at MC1R).

Modern dog breeds exhibit a diverse array of fur coats, including dogs without fur, such as the Mexican Hairless Dog. Dog coats vary in texture, color, and markings, and a specialized vocabulary has evolved to describe each characteristic.

=== Tail ===
There are many different shapes of dog tails: straight, straight up, sickle, curled and cork-screw. In some breeds, the tail is traditionally docked to avoid injuries (especially for hunting dogs). It can happen that some puppies are born with a short tail or no tail in some breeds. The T-box gene mutation (C189G) is responsible for bobtail breeds having no tail to short tail. Dogs have a violet gland or supracaudal gland on the dorsal (upper) surface of their tails.

=== Footpad ===
The dog's footpad is a fatty tissue locomotive-supporting organ, present at the bottom of the four legs, consisting of digital pads, a metacarpal pad, and a carpal pad, with dewclaw near the footpad. When a dog's footpad is exposed to the cold, heat loss is prevented by an adaptation of the blood system that recirculates heat back into the body. It brings blood from the skin surface and retains warm blood on the pad surface.

== Senses ==
=== Vision ===
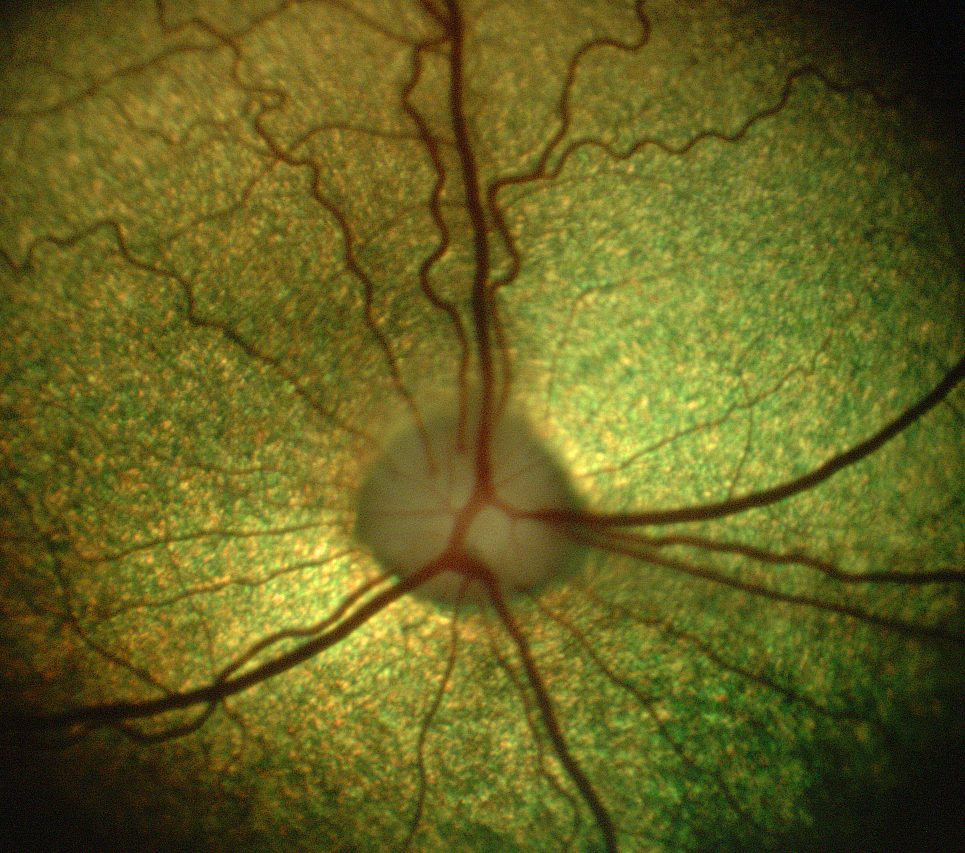
The dog's retina shows the optic disc and the eye's vasculature.

Like most mammals, dogs have only two types of cone photoreceptors, making them dichromats. These cone cells are maximally sensitive between 429 nm and 555 nm. Behavioural studies have shown that the dog's visual world consists of yellows, blues and grays, but they have difficulty differentiating between red and green, making their color vision equivalent to red–green color blindness in humans (deuteranopia). When a human perceives an object as "red," this object appears as "yellow" to the dog, and the human perception of "green" appears as "white," a shade of gray. This white region (the neutral point) occurs around 480 nm, the part of the spectrum that appears blue-green to humans. For dogs, wavelengths longer than the neutral point cannot be distinguished from each other, and all appear yellow.

Dogs use color instead of brightness to differentiate between light or dark blue/yellow. They are less sensitive to differences in gray shades than humans and can also detect brightness with about half the accuracy of humans. The dog's visual system has evolved to aid in hunting. Dogs have been shown to be able to discriminate between humans (e.g., identifying their human guardian) at a range of between 800 and 900 metres (2,600 and 3,000 ft); however, this range decreases to 500–600 metres (1,600–2,000 ft) if the object is stationary. Dogs can detect a change in movement that exists in a single diopter of space within their eye. Humans, by comparison, require a change of between 10 and 20 diopters to detect movement. A test has estimated poodles' visual acuity to have a Snellen rating of 20/75, a relatively low score compared to humans' vision.

As crepuscular hunters, dogs often rely on their vision in low light situations: They have very large pupils, a high density of rods in the fovea, an increased flicker rate, and a tapetum lucidum. The tapetum is a reflective surface behind the retina that reflects light to give the photoreceptors a second chance to catch the photons. There is also a relationship between body size and the overall diameter of the eye. A range of 9.5 and 11.6 mm can be found between various breeds of dogs. This 20% variance is associated with an adaptation toward superior night vision.

The eyes of different breeds of dogs have different shapes, dimensions, and retina configurations. Many long-nosed breeds have a "visual streak"—a wide foveal region that runs across the width of the retina and gives them a very wide field of excellent vision. Some long-muzzled breeds, in particular, the sighthounds, have a field of vision up to 270° (compared to 180° for humans). Short-nosed breeds, on the other hand, have an "area centralis", a central patch with up to three times the density of nerve endings as the visual streak, giving them detailed sight much more like a human's. Some broad-headed breeds with short noses have a field of vision similar to that of humans.

Most breeds have good vision, but some show a genetic predisposition for myopia—such as Rottweilers, with which one out of every two has been found to be myopic. Dogs also have a greater divergence of the eye axis than humans, enabling them to rotate their pupils farther in any direction. The divergence of the eye axis of dogs ranges from 12 to 25°, depending on the breed. Experimentation has found that dogs can distinguish between complex visual images such as those of a cube or a prism. Dogs also show attraction to static visual images such as the silhouette of a dog on a screen, their own reflections, or videos of dogs; however, their interest declines sharply once they are unable to make social contact with the image.

=== Hearing ===
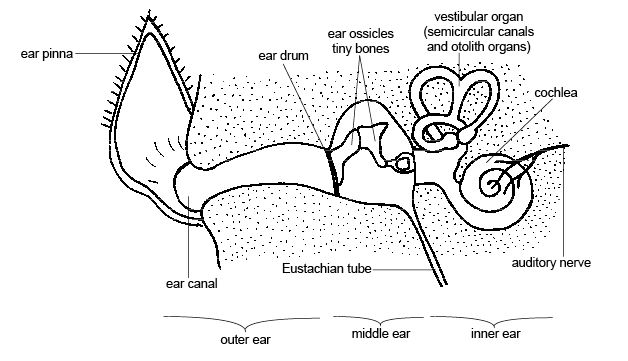
Schematic anatomy of the ear. In dogs, the ear canal has a "L" shape, with the vertical canal (first half) and the horizontal canal (deeper half, ending with the eardrum)

The frequency range of dog hearing is between 16 and 40 Hz (compared to 20–70 Hz for humans) and up to 45–60 kHz (compared to 13–20 kHz for humans), which means that dogs can detect sounds beyond the upper limit of the human auditory spectrum.

Dogs have ear mobility that allows them to rapidly pinpoint the exact location of a sound. Eighteen or more muscles can tilt, rotate, raise, or lower a dog's ear. A dog can identify a sound's location much faster than a human can, as well as hear sounds at four times the distance. Dogs can lose their hearing from age or an ear infection.

=== Smell ===
While the human brain is dominated by a large visual cortex, the dog brain is dominated by a large olfactory cortex. Dogs have roughly forty times more smell-sensitive receptors than humans, ranging from about 125 million to nearly 300 million in some dog breeds, such as bloodhounds.

=== Taste ===
A Berger Blanc Suisse is drinking water from a bowl in slow motion.

Dogs have around 1,700 taste buds compared to humans, with around 9,000. The sweet taste buds in dogs respond to furaneol. It appears that dogs do like this flavor, and it probably evolved because, in a natural environment, dogs frequently supplement their diet of small animals with whatever fruits are available. Because of dogs' dislike of bitter tastes, various sprays, and gels have been designed to keep dogs from chewing on furniture or other objects. Dogs also have taste buds that are tuned for water, which is something they share with other carnivores but is not found in humans. This taste sense is found at the tip of the dog's tongue, which is the part of the tongue that they curl to lap water. This area responds to water at all times, but when the dog has eaten salty or sugary foods, the sensitivity to the taste of water increases. It is proposed that this ability to taste water evolved as a way for the body to keep internal fluids in balance after the animal has eaten things that will either result in more urine being passed or will require more water to adequately process. It appears that when these special water taste buds are active, dogs seem to get an extra pleasure out of drinking water, and will drink copious amounts of it.

=== Touch ===
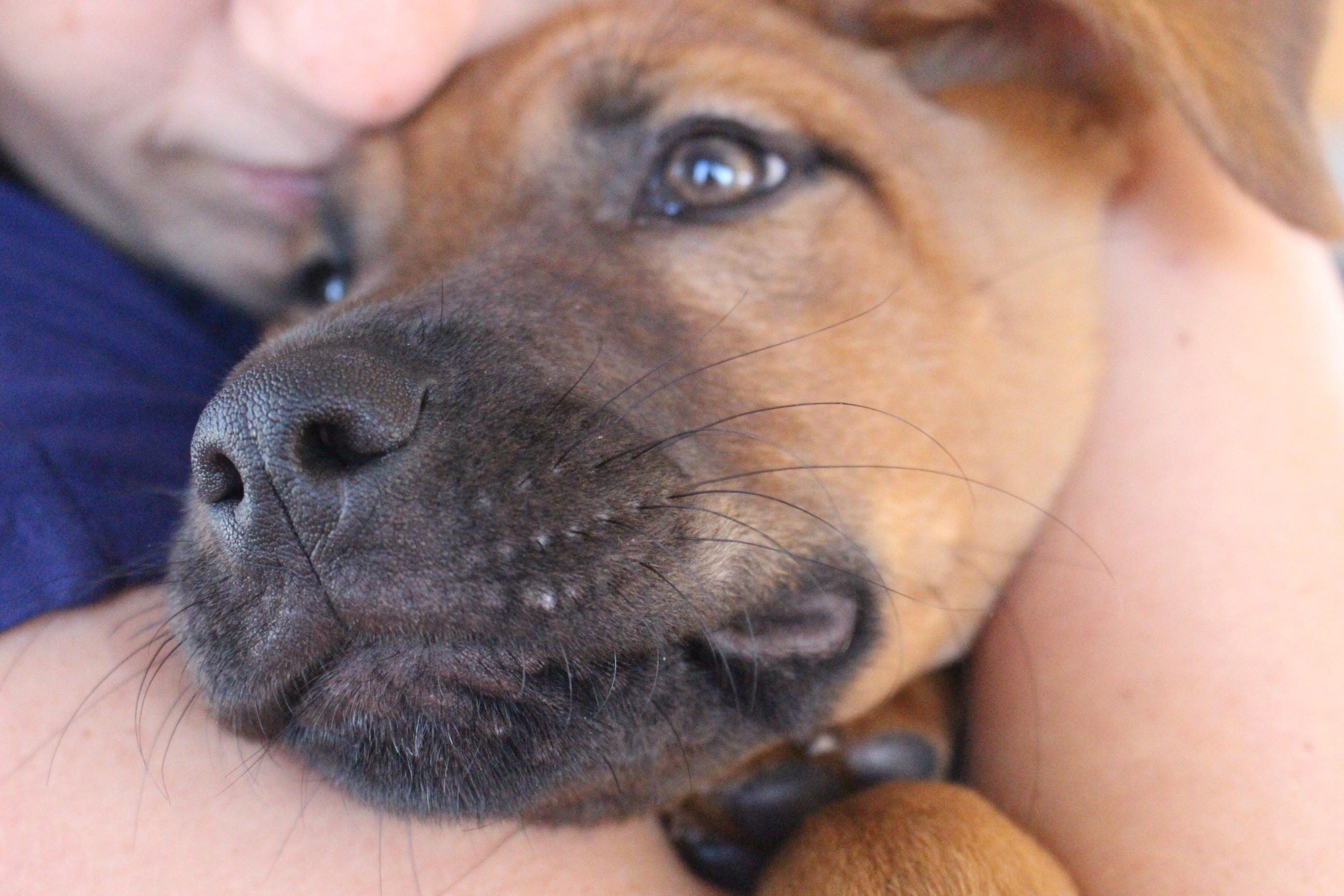
A dog's whiskers

Dogs have specialized whiskers known as vibrissae, sensing organs present above the dog's eyes, below their jaw, and on their muzzle. Vibrissae are more rigid, embedded much more deeply in the skin than other hairs, and have a greater number of receptor cells at their base. They can detect air currents, subtle vibrations, and objects in the dark. They provide an early warning system for objects that might strike the face or eyes, and probably help direct food and objects towards the mouth.

=== Magnetic sensitivity ===
A study found that dogs may prefer, when they are off the leash and the Earth's magnetic field is calm, to urinate and defecate with their bodies aligned on a north–south axis. Dogs are sensitive to changes in the Earth's magnetic field polarity. No significant differences between males and females in angular preferences were found. Some studies have detected cryptochrome 1 in some dogs' photoreceptors' blue-sensitive cones.

== Temperature regulation ==
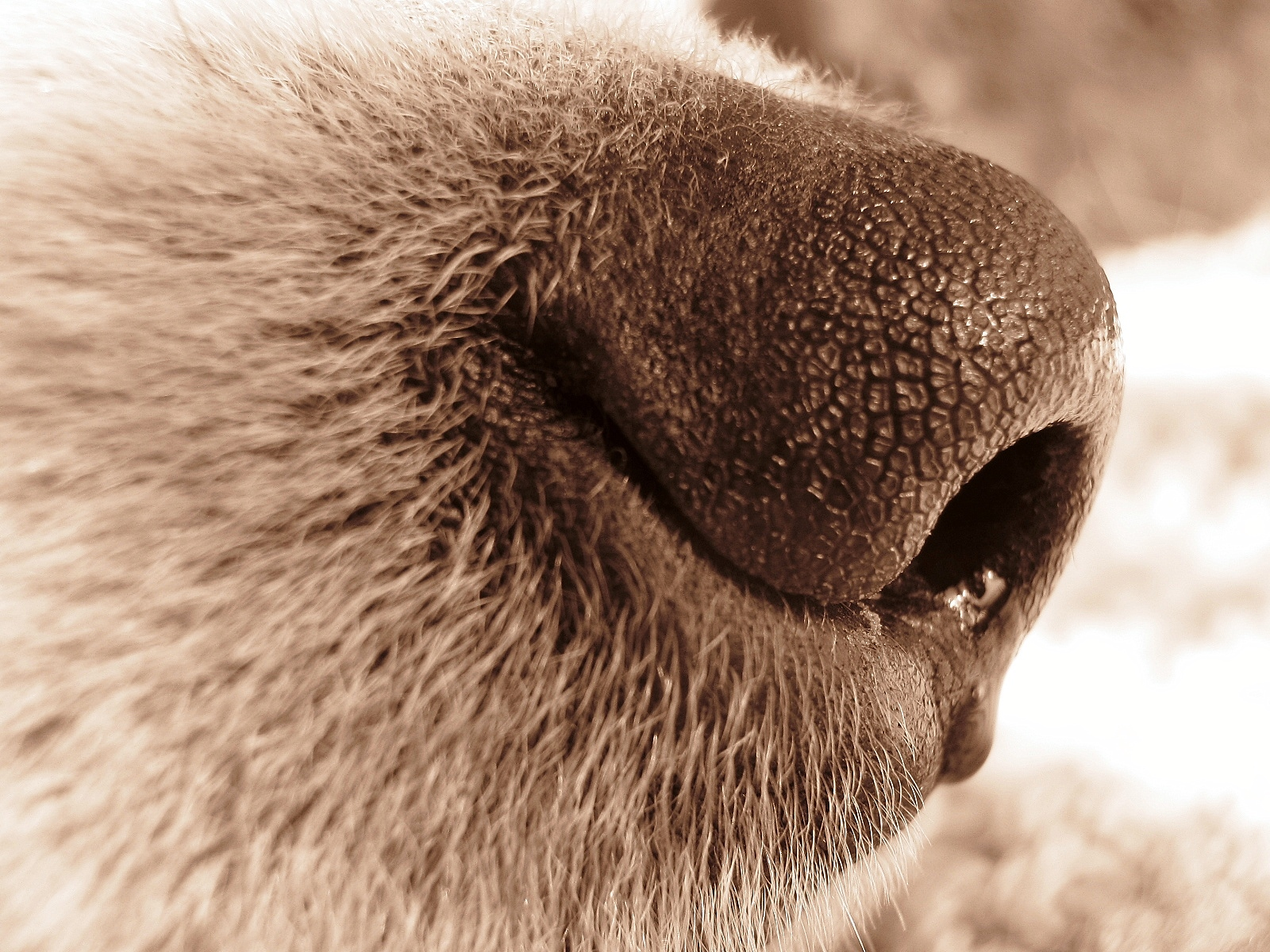
The nose of a dog

Primarily, dogs regulate their body temperature through panting and sweating via their paws. Panting moves cooling air over the moist surfaces of the tongue and lungs, transferring heat to the atmosphere.

Dogs and other canids also possess a set of nasal turbinates, an elaborate set of bones and associated soft-tissue structures (including arteries and veins) in the nasal cavities. These turbinates allow for heat exchange between small arteries and veins on their maxilloturbinate surfaces (the surfaces of turbinates positioned on maxilla bone) in a counter-current heat-exchange system. Compared to the ambush predation of cats, dogs are capable of prolonged chases due to these turbinates (cats possess a much smaller and less-developed set of nasal turbinates). This same turbinate structure helps conserve water in arid environments. The water conservation and thermoregulatory capabilities of these turbinates in dogs may have allowed dogs (including both domestic dogs and their wild prehistoric ancestors) to survive in the Arctic environment and other cold areas of northern Eurasia and North America, which are dry and cold.
