= Shih Tzu =

Dog breed

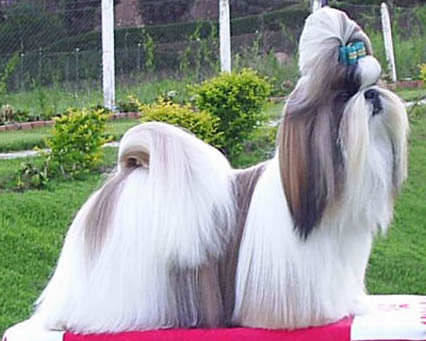
- A Shih Tzu in full show coat
- Other names: Chrysanthemum Dog
- Origin: Tibet
Traits
Height	Males	20–28 centimetres (7.9–11.0 in)
	Females	20–28 centimetres (7.9–11.0 in)
- Weight: 4–7.5 kilograms (8.8–16.5 lb)
- Coat: See coat colors section below
- Color: Often multiple color coats; Gold; Dark/light brown; Black; Grey; Liver/white
- Litter size: 2–9
Kennel club standards
- China Kennel Union: standard
- The Royal Kennel Club: standard
- Fédération Cynologique Internationale: standard

The Shih Tzu (UK: /ˌʃiːˈtsuː/, US: /ˈʃiːtsuː/) is a toy dog or pet dog breed originating from Tibet and believed to be bred from the Pekingese and the Lhasa Apso.

== Description ==
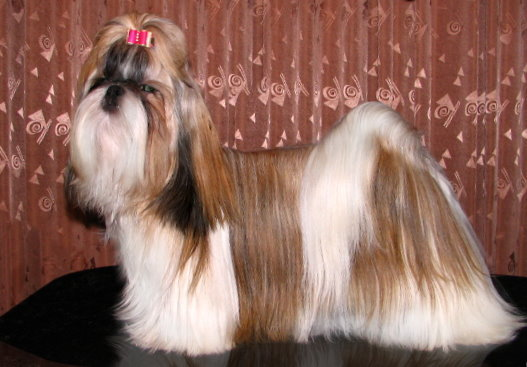
A Tricolor (black, white, brown) Shih Tzu in show coat.

The Shih Tzu is a sturdy little dog with a small snout and normally has large dark brown eyes. They have a soft and long double coat that will tangle and mat easily if not brushed at least every 2 or 3 days. A Shih Tzu should stand no more than 26.7 cm (10 1/2") at the withers and with an ideal weight of 4.0 to 7.5kg (9 to 17 lbs). Their floppy ears are covered with long hair, and their heavily hair-covered tail is carried curled over the back. The coat may be of any color, though white and with blazes of grey are frequently seen. A very noticeable feature is the underbite, which is required in the breed standard. The Chinese have described their head shapes as "owl head" and "lion head", and their mouth as "frog mouths" and their lips as "earthworm lips".

== Etymology ==
Shih Tzu
- Traditional Chinese: 獅子
- Simplified Chinese: 狮子
- Literal meaning: lion
Transcriptions
Standard Mandarin
- Hanyu Pinyin: shīzi
- Bopomofo: ㄕ ˙ㄗ
- Wade–Giles: shih^{1}-tzu
- IPA: [ʂʐ̩˥ d͡z̥z̩˨]
Yue: Cantonese
- Yale Romanization: sī jí
- Jyutping: si^{1} zi^{2}
- IPA: [siː˥ t͡siː˧˥]

Chinese name
- Chinese: 西施犬
- Literal meaning: Hsi Shih dog
Transcriptions
Standard Mandarin
- Hanyu Pinyin: Xī Shī quǎn
- Bopomofo: ㄒㄧ ㄕ ㄑㄩㄢˇ
- Wade–Giles: hsi^{1}-shih^{1} ch'üan^{3}
- IPA: [ɕíʂɨ́ tɕʰɥɛ̀n]
Yue: Cantonese
- Yale Romanization: sāi sī hyún
- Jyutping: sai^{1} si^{1} hyun^{2}
- IPA: [sɐi̯˥ siː˥ hyːn˧˥]

The name comes from the Wade–Giles romanization of the Mandarin Chinese word for "lion" (狮子; shīzi), because this kind of dog was bred to resemble "the lion, as in traditional oriental art". (The Pekingese breed is also called "lion dog" in Chinese).

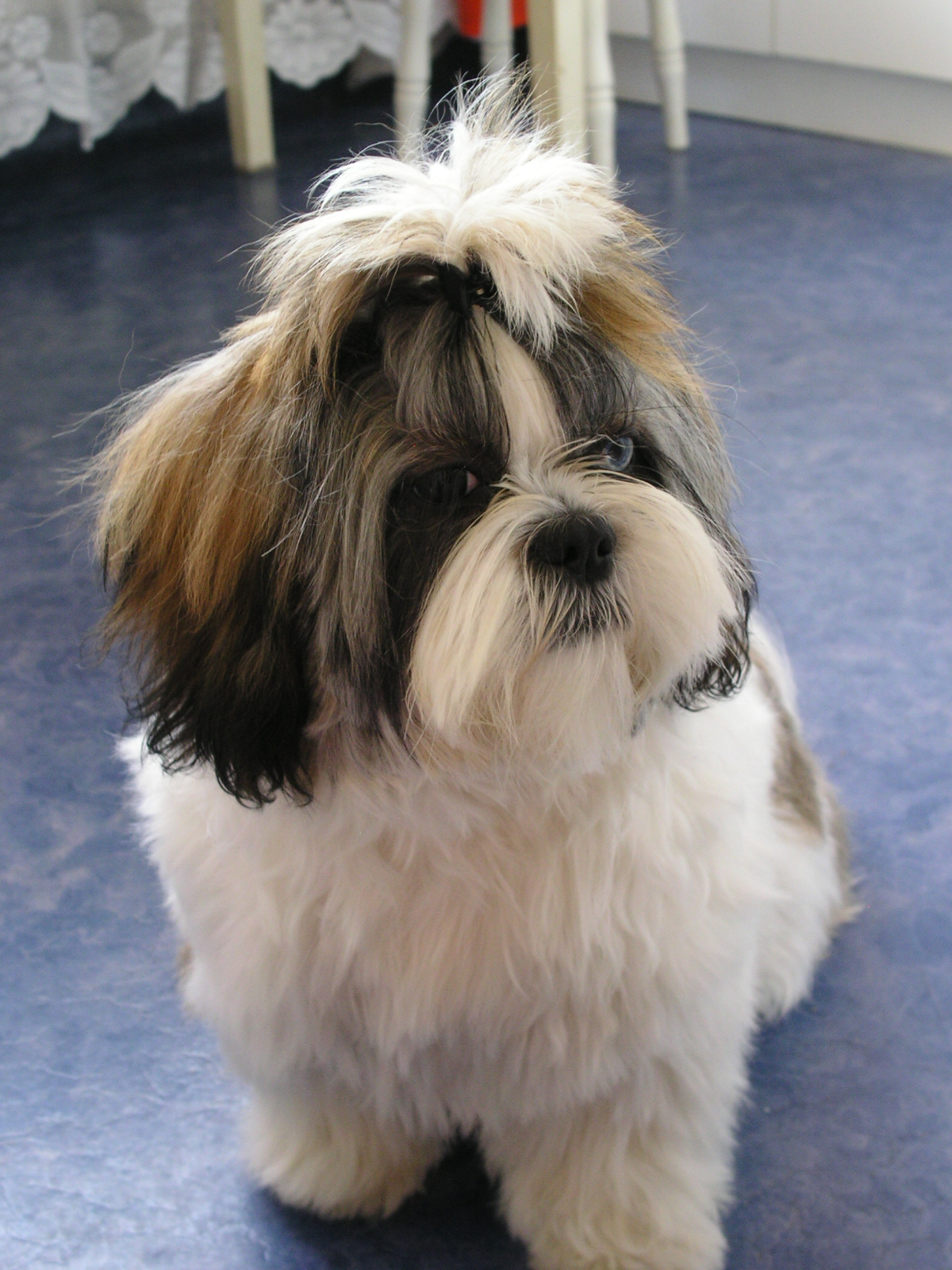
A female Shih Tzu at around 18 months of age.

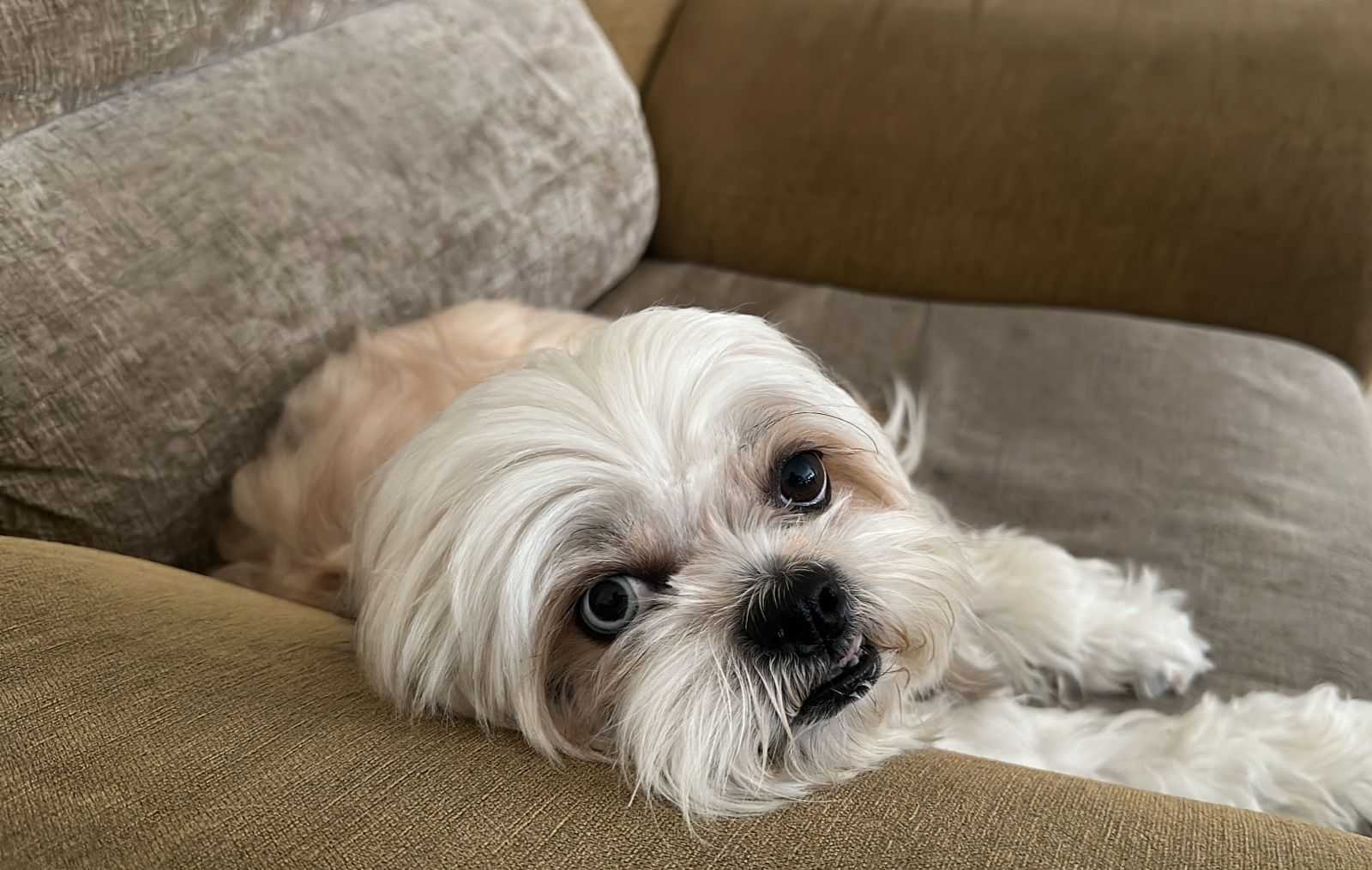
A female Shih Tzu, with different colored eyes.

In contemporary Mandarin, the Shih Tzu is generally known as the "Xi Shi dog" (西施犬; Xī Shī quǎn), Xi Shi being regarded as one of the most beautiful women of ancient China. Shih Tzu was nicknamed the "chrysanthemum dog" in England in the 1930s. The dog may also be called the Tibetan Lion Dog, but whether the breed should be referred to as "Tibetan" or "Chinese" is a source of both historical and political contention, and dog historians tend to have very strong opinions on the subject.

== History ==
One theory is that the Shih Tzu descended from a cross between the Pekingese and Lhasa Apso. The dogs were favorites of the Chinese royals during the Ming Dynasty and were so prized that, for years, the Chinese refused to sell, trade, or give any away. Empress Dowager Cixi developed a program dedicated to breeding Shih Tzus. Many court eunuchs also bred Shih Tzus to win favor with the Emperor.

The first dogs of the breed were imported into Europe (England and Norway) during the 1920s and 1930s. Lady Brownrigg, an Englishwoman living in China, first brought two Shih Tzus to England in 1928. These dogs were classified by the Kennel Club as "Apsos". The first European standard for the breed was written in England in 1935 by the Shih Tzu Club, and the dogs were categorised again as Shih Tzu. This was the result of the first congregation of these dogs from China at Crufts in 1933 at which it was realised that the Tibetan Terrier, Apso and Shih Tzu were distinctly different breeds. The breed spread throughout Europe and was brought to the United States after World War II, when returning members of the U.S. military brought back dogs from Europe and Asia, in the mid-1950s. The Shih Tzu was recognized by the American Kennel Club in 1969 in the Toy Group.

In 1934, the Shih Tzu Club of England was founded and the breed was officially recognised by the Kennel Club (UK) on 7 May 1940. When it became eligible for Challenge Certificates, none were awarded until 1949. The breed is now recognized by all of the major kennel clubs in the English-speaking world. It is also recognized by the Fédération Cynologique Internationale for international competition in Companion and Toy Dog Group, Section 5, Tibetan breeds.

Controversially, breeder Freda Evans of England introduced a black and white Pekingese into the breed in 1952. Today, both the U.K. and U.S. Kennel Clubs recognize the descendants of the Shih Tzu and Pekingese cross as purebred Shih Tzus.

In the United States, the Shih Tzus were ranked the 20th most popular breed in 2024, falling slightly in popularity since 2012 when it was placed in 11th position. In Israel the Shih Tzus were ranked as the most popular breed in 2019.

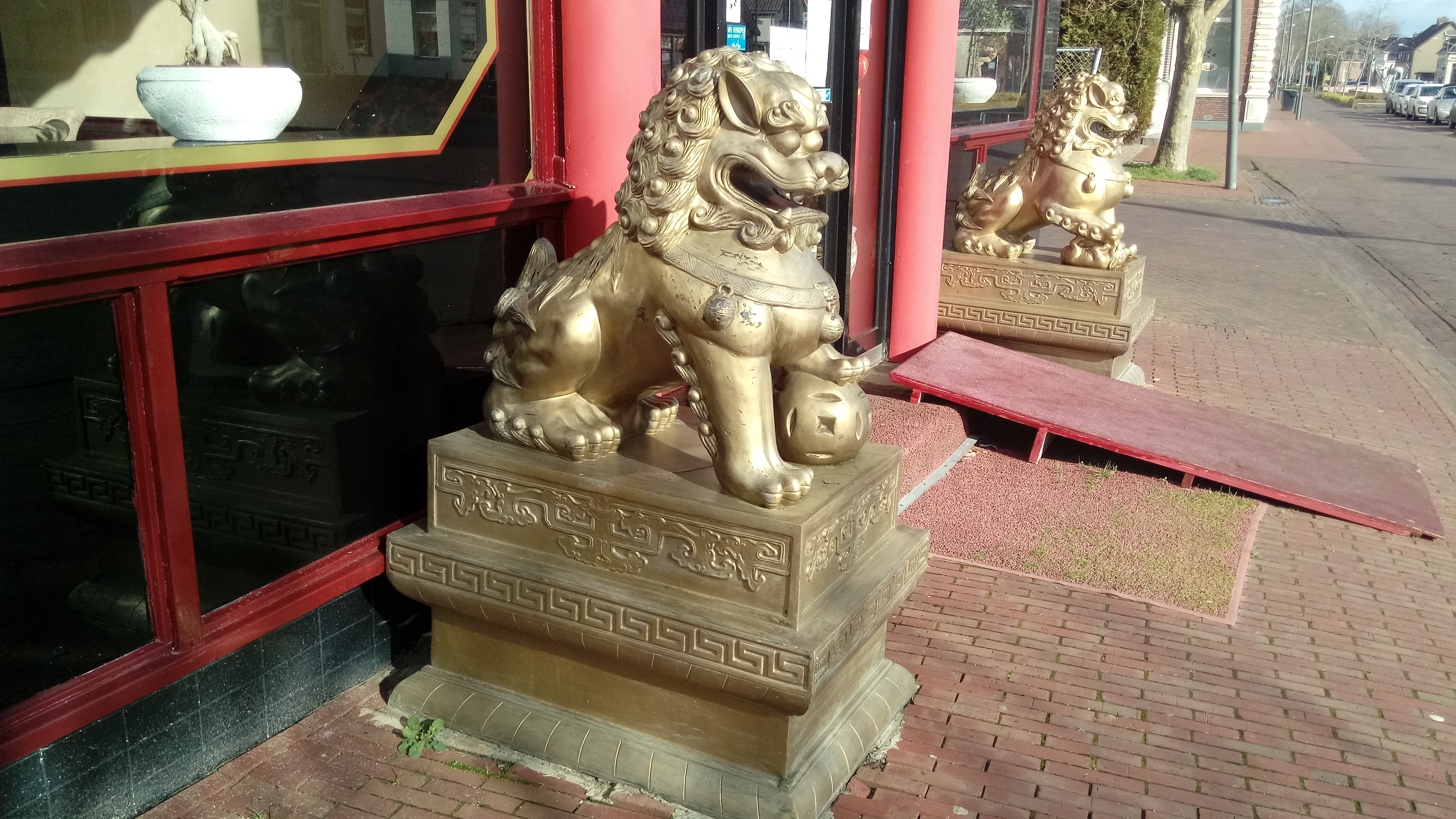
A Chinese guardian lion (or "Fu"/"Foo" dog) statue in the Groninger city of Veendam, Veenkoloniën. These statues are meant to guard this building, with the one on the left holding a ball and the one on the right with her puppy.

== In Buddhist mythology ==
Shih Tzus are largely associated with Buddhism and Buddhist mythology. The name "Shih Tzu" in Mandarin directly translates to "lion", an animal considered sacred in Buddhist religion. Lions symbolize royalty, strength, and bravery – "fear nothing, and act without delay." Pairs of stone lions or lion dogs located outside guard palace doors, tombs, temples, and public buildings are thought to protect these buildings from harmful individuals and spiritual influences. These stone statues are often called Fu (or Foo) dogs, and it is suggested that these are the lionized form of the Shih Tzu. "Fu" roughly translates to "happiness" in Manchurian, with legend stating Fu dogs are happy Shih Tzus forever guarding the temple of Buddha. Fu dog statues typically represent a male and female Shih Tzu, carved out of stone, jade, teak, ivory, cinnabar, bronze, or ceramics. The male dog is often seen holding a ball with his left paw and the female dog holds her puppy. Sources state this holds a symbolic meaning, with the male dog representing powers over nature, energy, wisdom, and precious stones and the female dog symbolizing protection, play, and a disciplinary attitude.

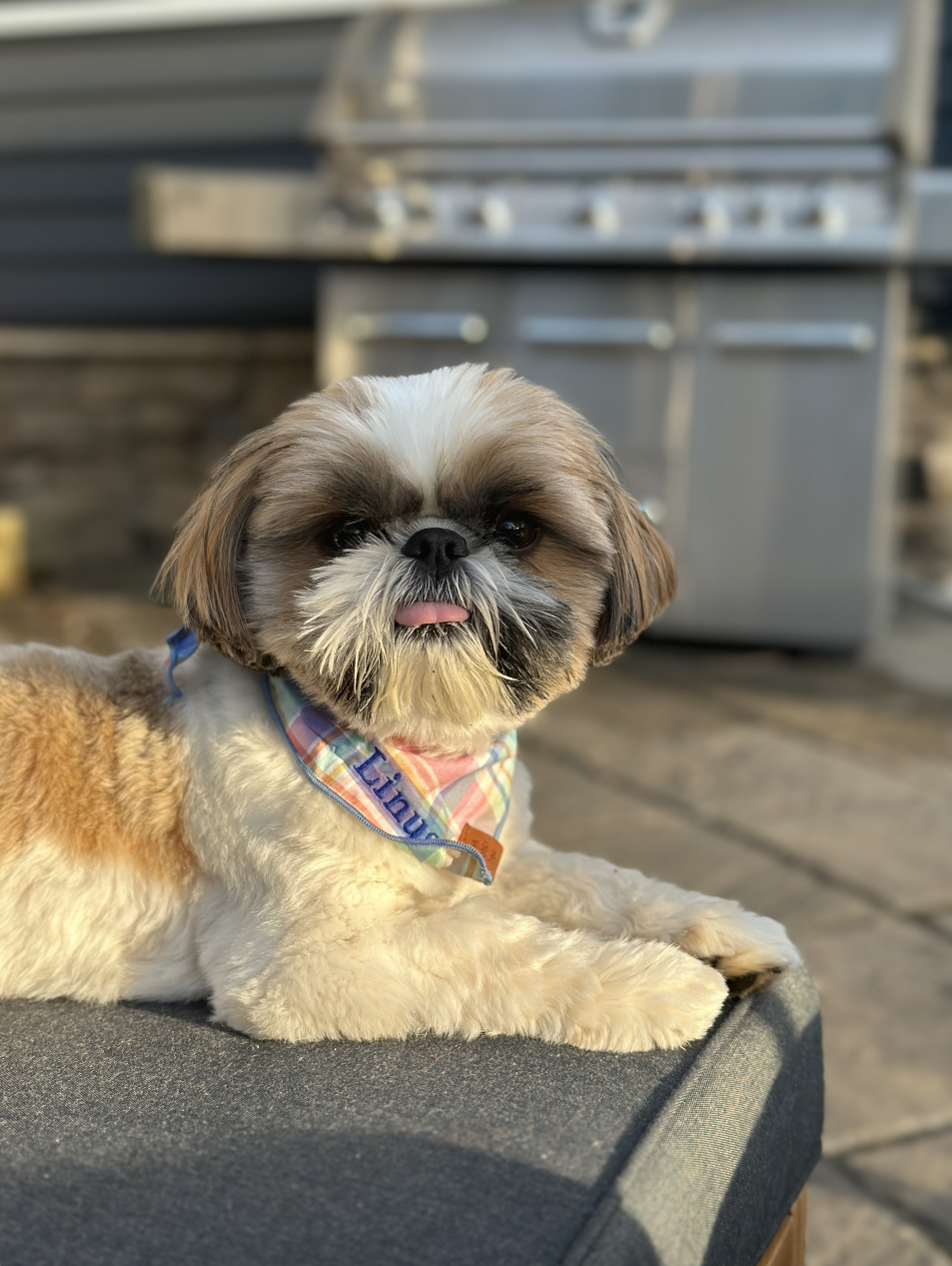
A male Shih Tzu shown with the star of Buddha on his head, marked by the white patch of hair.

Buddhists consider Shih Tzus blessed by and sacred beasts of Buddha. Legend states Buddha rode to earth on a lion and carried with him a small lion dog which accompanied him everywhere he went. Legends vary across different sources, however many cite the Shih Tzu accompanied the Buddha of wisdom, Manjushri. This lion dog had the ability to turn himself into a lion to carry Manjushri on his back. The physical features of Shih Tzus serve as proof of the eternal connection between Buddha and this breed. According to legend, several robbers surrounded Buddha with the intention of robbing and murdering him when the Shih Tzu transformed into a ferocious lion so large that the robbers were scared and fled the scene. As the Shih Tzu returned to its dog form, Buddha blessed him for his courage. Many Shih Tzus reflect this blessing in the form of the "Star of Buddha", which may also be called "Buddha's kiss", represented as a white patch of hair on the top of dog's head. Markings on the dogs back is said to be the saddle Buddha used to ride the dog in its lion form. Legends vary across sources, largely because legends are historically passed down by word-of-mouth. Some cite this mark on the head as the place where Buddha kissed the dog, giving it his blessing. Other sources state Buddha laid his finger on the dog's forehead in blessing, giving it a flash of white hair on its forehead.

== Coat colors ==
The Shih Tzu comes in many colours. The following colours are recognised by The Royal Kennel Club:

- black and white
- brindle
- brindle and white
- gold and white
- gold brindle
- gold brindle and white
- gold with black mask
- grey and white
- solid black
- solid gold
- liver
- liver and white

Additionally, the following colours are recognised as existing within the breed but not being part of the standard: blue, cream, lilac, lilac & white, white, particolour.

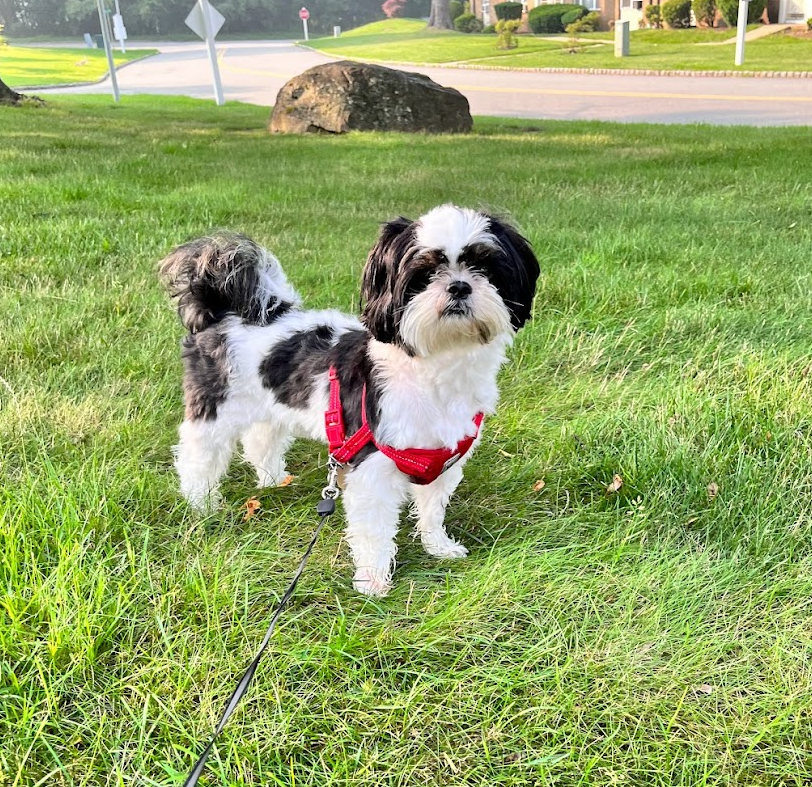
Black and white coat colour on Shih Tzu

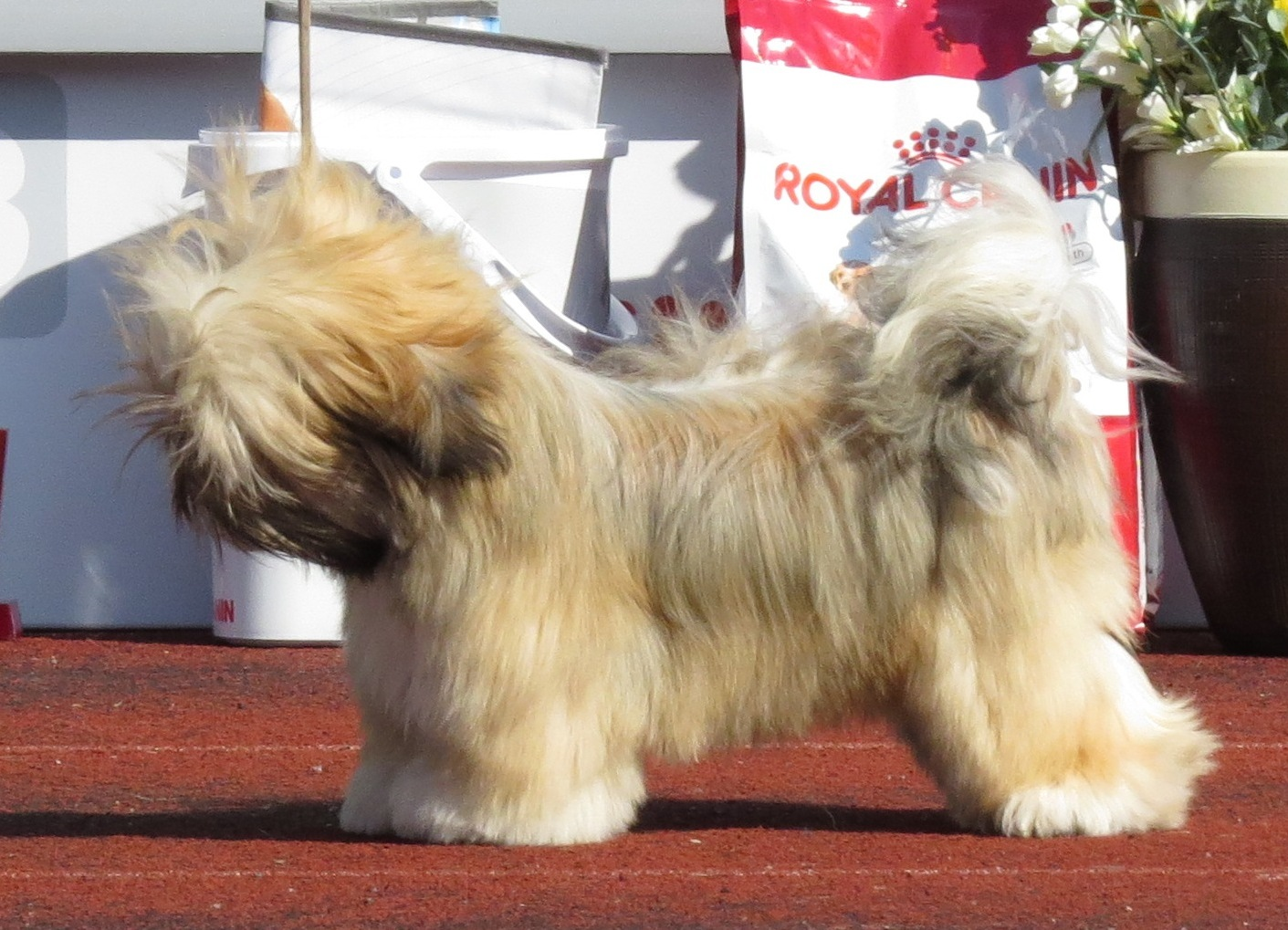
A cream coloured Shih Tzu

== Health ==
A number of health issues, some of them hereditary, have been found in individual Shih Tzu, and are listed below. The popularity of the breed has allowed for extremely poor breeding in general, leading to generalized and lifelong diseases, often from a fairly early age.

=== Heart disease ===
Mitral valve disease is the most common heart disease in dogs and can lead to congestive heart failure (CHF). The condition is more common in smaller dogs including the Shih Tzu.

=== Brachycephaly ===
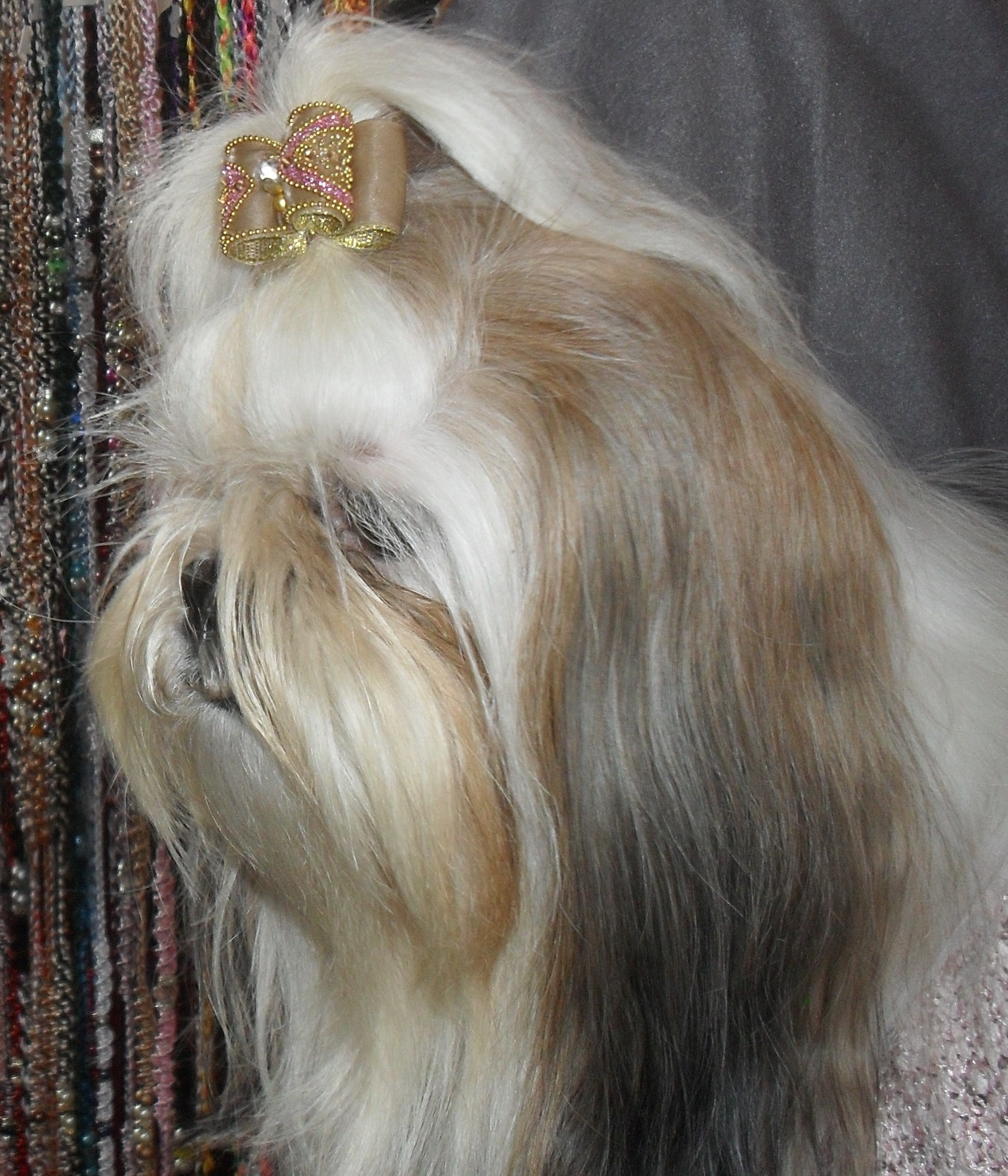
A Shih Tzu at a dog show

The short nose of the Shih Tzu causes breathing difficulties and other health issues in the dog. Brachycephalic airway obstruction syndrome (BAOS) is a condition caused by brachycephaly. The main issues arising from the shortened muzzle are stenotic nares, where the nostrils are close together causing difficulties with breathing through the nose; an elongated soft palate; and tracheal hypoplasia, a narrow windpipe. This causes difficulty breathing which leads to increased respiratory effort which further narrows the trachea which can lead to laryngeal collapse. Dogs suffering from BAOS struggle with exercise, are prone to heat stroke due to ineffective evaporative ability, and have trouble sleeping.

=== Eye issues ===
It is very common for Shih Tzus to develop eye problems at any age, and even more so once they are older. Most veterinarians will recommend eye drops to assist with any eye irritations. Some dogs have allergies which cause excess discharge around the eye. Older Shih Tzu are known to develop cataracts which can be corrected with surgery. If not treated, the dog may become blind in the eye that has the cataract. The distinctive large eyes can easily be scratched which may cause an ulcer. The dog will normally have the injured eye closed or half closed and may have excessive tears. The most common problem of Shih Tzus concerning eye conditions is the formation of epiphora caused by the fur on the eyelids scratching the conjunctiva and the cornea. However this can be medicated by the application of prescribed eye drops from a certified veterinarian such as eyevita. Shih Tzus are also prone to excessive tear production which in turn cause tear stains around the eyes. A study from Japan reviewing cases of dogs presented for ophthalmologic examination found the Shih Tzu to make up 16% of all glaucoma cases whilst only making up 8.2% of the total population used in the study.

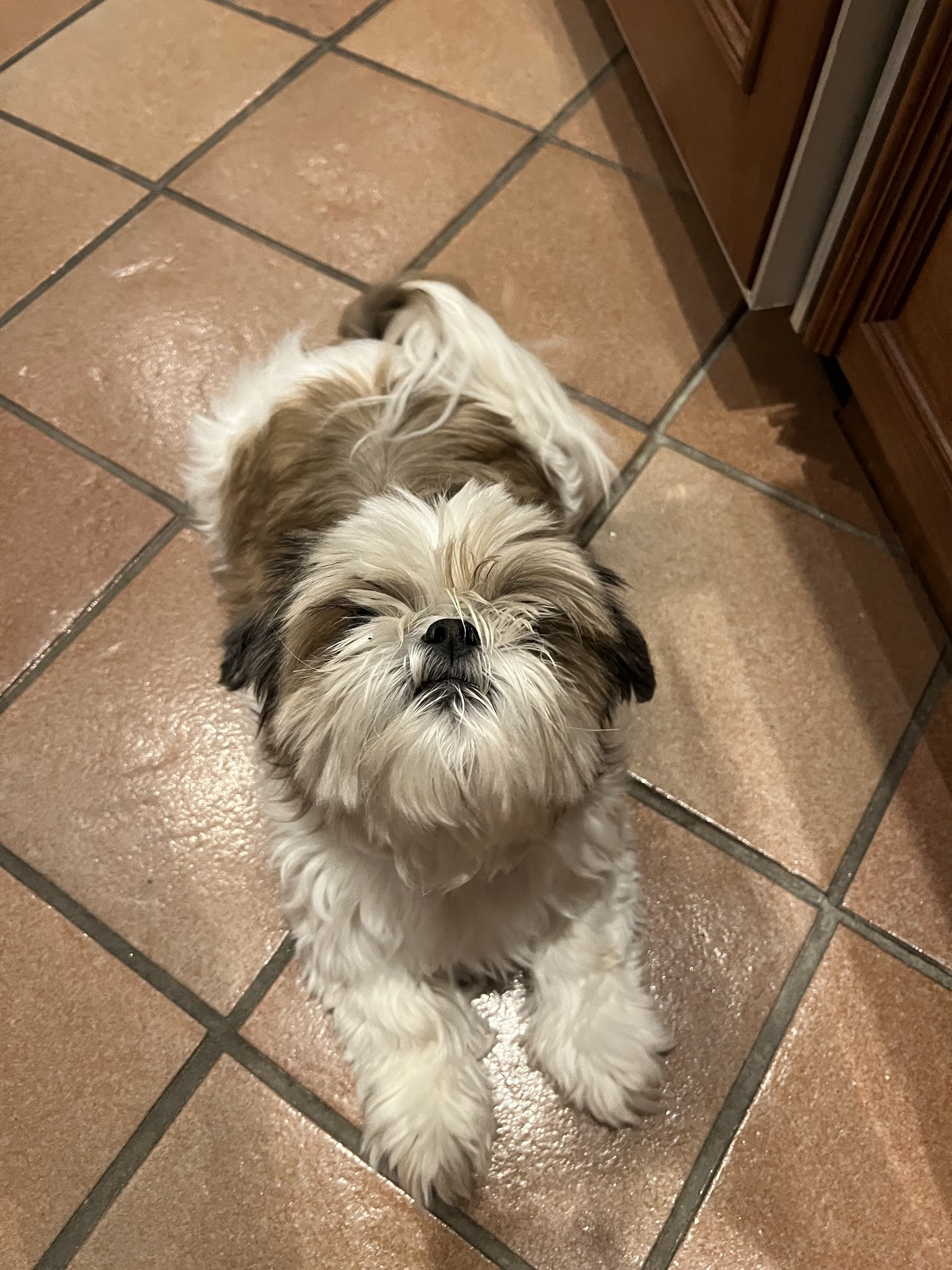
Shih tzu with hair covering eyes. Untrimmed hair can be an issue. This is remedied with a top knot or a short puppy cut.

=== Ear issues ===
A very common issue for Shih Tzus is the development of ear infections, as they have a long coat and hair grows in their ears. If ears are not plucked and cleaned often, ear infections will reoccur and cause more serious health issues.

=== Hepatobiliary ===
A UK study found the Shih Tzu to have a 4.02 times greater risk of impaired hepatic perfusion, a condition resulting in reduced bloodflow to the liver, compared to other dogs.

=== Life expectancy ===
A 2022 study in the United Kingdom found the life expectancy of the Shih Tzu to be 11 years, a few months below the average life expectancy of all dogs. A 2024 UK study found a life expectancy of 12.8 years for the breed compared to an average of 12.7 for purebreeds and 12 for crossbreeds. A Japanese study found the Shih Tzu to have a life expectancy of 15 years, above the 14 year average for all dogs. (Note: The Japanese study reviewed cemetery data which is unlikely to have any records of still-births and altricial deaths whilst a veterinary clinic likely would have data on these.)

== Variations ==
=== Kennel club differences ===
There is a difference between the Shih Tzu of the American Kennel Club and the Kennel Club (UK).

==== The AKC (American Kennel Club) Shih-Tzu ====
- Their front legs (forequarters) are straight. Their hindquarters are muscular. Neither should be too short nor too long.
- The standard head is big and round and is set high with face looking forward or up.
- The neck and body are the most important and should not be exaggerated.
- The eyes are large and face the front.
- The shoulders of the American type of Shih-Tzu are frontal.

== See also ==
- List of dog breeds
- The Kennel Club
- Lhasa Apso
- Pekinese
- Maltese
