= Stenotic nares =

Narrowing of the nostrils in animals

Before surgery

After surgery

Stenotic nares means the nares (nostrils) are pinched or narrow, making it more difficult for an animal to breathe, and resulting in a lot of open-mouth breathing and panting. The condition is part of the brachycephalic airway obstructive syndrome common to short-nosed dog and cat breeds. Dog breeds commonly affected by stenotic nares include Boston Terrier, Boxer, Bulldog, King Charles Spaniel, Lhasa Apso, Pug, and Shih Tzu. Stenotic nares is a congenital trait, meaning an animal is born with it. Veterinarians can perform a simple surgery to help widen the nares, which can be done at the same time as a spay or neuter surgery.

== Treatment ==
Several resection techniques exist to help correct stenotic nares including alar wing amputation (Trader's technique), punch resection, vertical wedge, horizontal wedge, alapexy, and laser ablation. CO_{2} laser repair of the stenotic nares is bloodless, allowing a clear view of the surgical field and more precise surgical incisions.

== Prevention ==
Since stenotic nares is congenital, there is no prevention other than breeding the trait out over generations.
