= Brachycephalic obstructive airway syndrome =

Condition affecting short-nosed dogs and cats

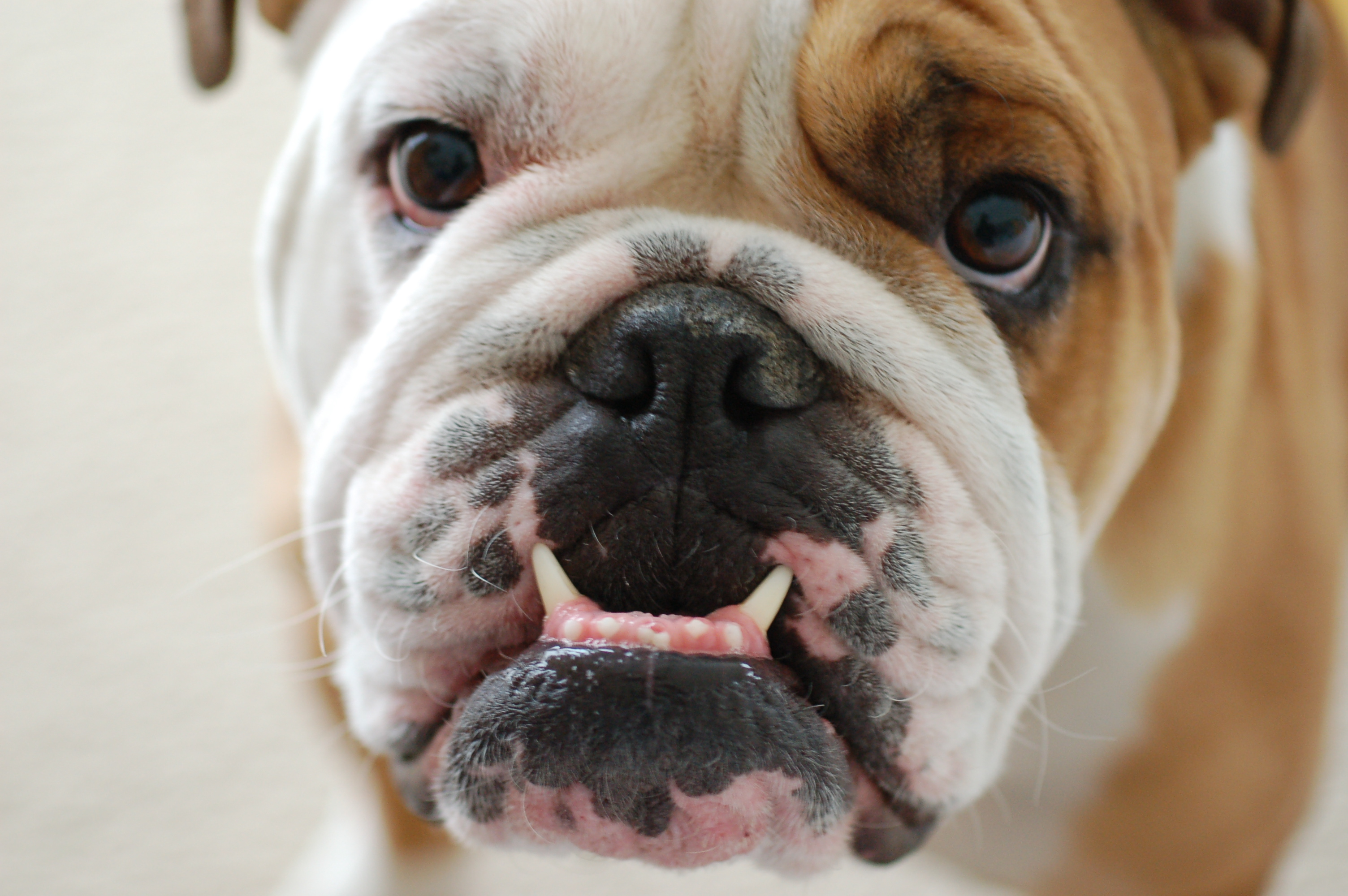
The English bulldog, a typically brachycephalic dog breed, may have brachycephalic syndrome.

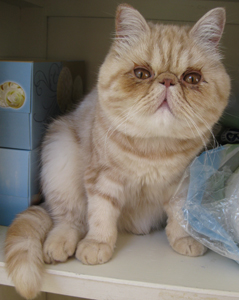
A peke-face Exotic Shorthair.

Brachycephalic obstructive airway syndrome (BOAS), also known as brachycephalic airway obstructive syndrome (BAOS), brachycephalic airway syndrome (BAS), and brachycephalic syndrome (BS), is a pathological condition affecting short nosed dogs and cats which can lead to severe respiratory distress. There are four different anatomical abnormalities that contribute to the disease, all of which occur more commonly in brachycephalic breeds: an elongated soft palate, stenotic nares, a hypoplastic trachea, and everted laryngeal saccules (a condition which occurs secondary to the other abnormalities). Because all of these components make it more difficult to breathe in situations of exercise, stress, or heat, an animal with these abnormalities may be unable to take deep or fast enough breaths to blow off carbon dioxide. This leads to distress and further increases respiratory rate and heart rate, creating a vicious cycle that can quickly lead to a life-threatening situation.

Brachycephalic dogs have a higher risk of dying during air travel and many commercial airlines refuse to transport them.

Dogs experiencing a crisis situation due to brachycephalic syndrome typically benefit from oxygen, cool temperatures, sedatives, and in some cases more advanced medical intervention, including intubation.

== Causes and risk factors ==
This diagram illustrates what the airway structure looks like in a brachycephalic dog; in this case, a Boxer.: 1. Nasal cavity 2. Oral cavity 3. Soft palate 4. Pharynx 5. Larynx 6. Trachea 7. Esophagus 8. Nasopharynx 9. Hard palate; The brachycephalic dog has a shorter snout that causes the airway to be shorter, which means all the parts that make up the airway get compressed. Due to this phenomenon, a brachycephalic dog has an elongated soft palate which can cause most of the problems with the dog's breathing. They can also have problems getting enough air in because of their elongated soft palate and shorter airway.

The primary anatomic components of BOAS are stenotic nares (pinched or narrowed nostrils) and soft palate hyperplasia. Other anatomical factors that are involved include aberrant cochae, skull confirmation, macroglossia, glottic stenosis, and tracheal hypoplasia. These anatomical factors can also result in secondary conditions like everted laryngeal saccules, partial collapse of the dorsonasal pharynx, and laryngeal collapse.

Other risk factors for BOAS include a lower craniofacial ratio (shorter muzzle in comparison to the overall head length), a higher neck girth, a higher body condition score, and neuter status.

In addition to this mucosal hyperplasia and collapse of the airway can aggravate the condition.

== Breed prevalence ==
The breeds most commonly affected are the Bulldog, French Bulldog, Pug, and Boston Terrier. Other brachycephalic breeds include: the Pekingese, Shih Tzu, Lhasa Apso, Cavalier King Charles Spaniel, Boxer, Dogue de Bordeaux, Brussels Griffon, and Bullmastiff.

== Signs and symptoms ==
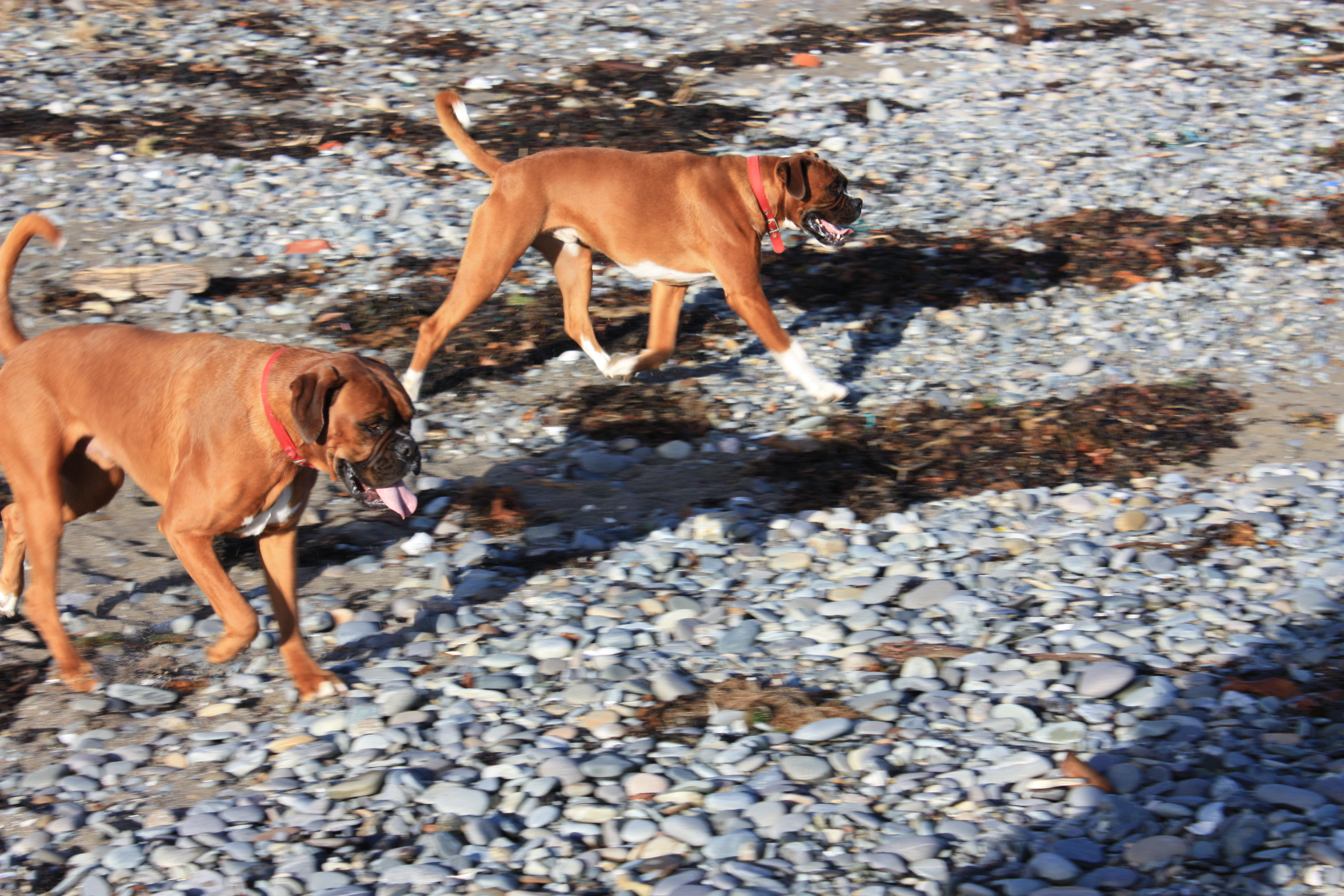
Breeds with less extreme brachycephalia, such as the Boxer, have less compromised thermoregulation and thus are more tolerant of vigorous exercise and heat.

Symptoms of brachycephaly include: snoring, dyspnoea, emesis, stridor, insomnia, cyanosis, syncope, and dysphagia.

Despite observing clinical signs of airway obstructions, some owners of brachycephalic breeds may perceive them as normal for the breed, and may not seek veterinary intervention until a particularly severe attack happens.

After waking from surgery, most dogs that are intubated will try to claw out their tracheal tube. In contrast, brachycephalic dogs often seem quite happy to leave it in place as it opens the airway, making it easier to breathe.

=== Secondary conditions ===
Other conditions may be observed concurrently. These include swollen/everted laryngeal saccules, which further reduce the airway, collapsed larynx, and chronic obstructive pulmonary disease caused by the increased lung workload.

== Treatment ==
Stenotic nares in a Boxer before (left) and after (right) surgery.

Treatment consists of surgery for widening the nostrils, removing the excess tissue of an elongated soft palate, or removing everted laryngeal saccules. Early treatment prevents secondary conditions from developing.

Potential complications include hemorrhages, pain, and inflammation during and after surgery. Some veterinarians are hesitant to perform soft palate correction surgery. With CO_{2} surgical lasers, these complications are greatly diminished.

== Prevention ==
Avoiding stress, high temperatures, and overfeeding can reduce the risk. Using harnesses instead of collars can avoid pressure on the trachea.

The risk of brachycephalic syndrome increases as the muzzle becomes shorter. To avoid producing affected dogs, breeders may choose to breed for more moderate features rather than for extremely short or flat faces. Dogs with breathing difficulties, or at least those serious enough to require surgery, should not be used for breeding. Removing all affected animals from the breeding pool may cause some breeds to be unsustainable and outcrossing to non-brachycephalic breeds might be necessary.

Although outcrossing can attempt to lengthen the average snout length within a breed over time and reduce BOAS, it is not popular with established breed registries who record pedigrees of purebred dogs. In 2014, the Dutch government passed the Animals Act and the Animal Keepers Act, and subsequent enforcement caused the Dutch Kennel Club (Raad van Beheer) in 2020 to announce they were restricting registrations within 12 dog breeds based on snout length, and encouraging outcrosses to other breeds, while promising that future generations may be eligible for registration as purebreds. This caused concern with the Fédération Cynologique Internationale (FCI), of which RvB is a member, and with the American Kennel Club, both of which expressed concerns about governments legislating such matters.

== Other health problems ==
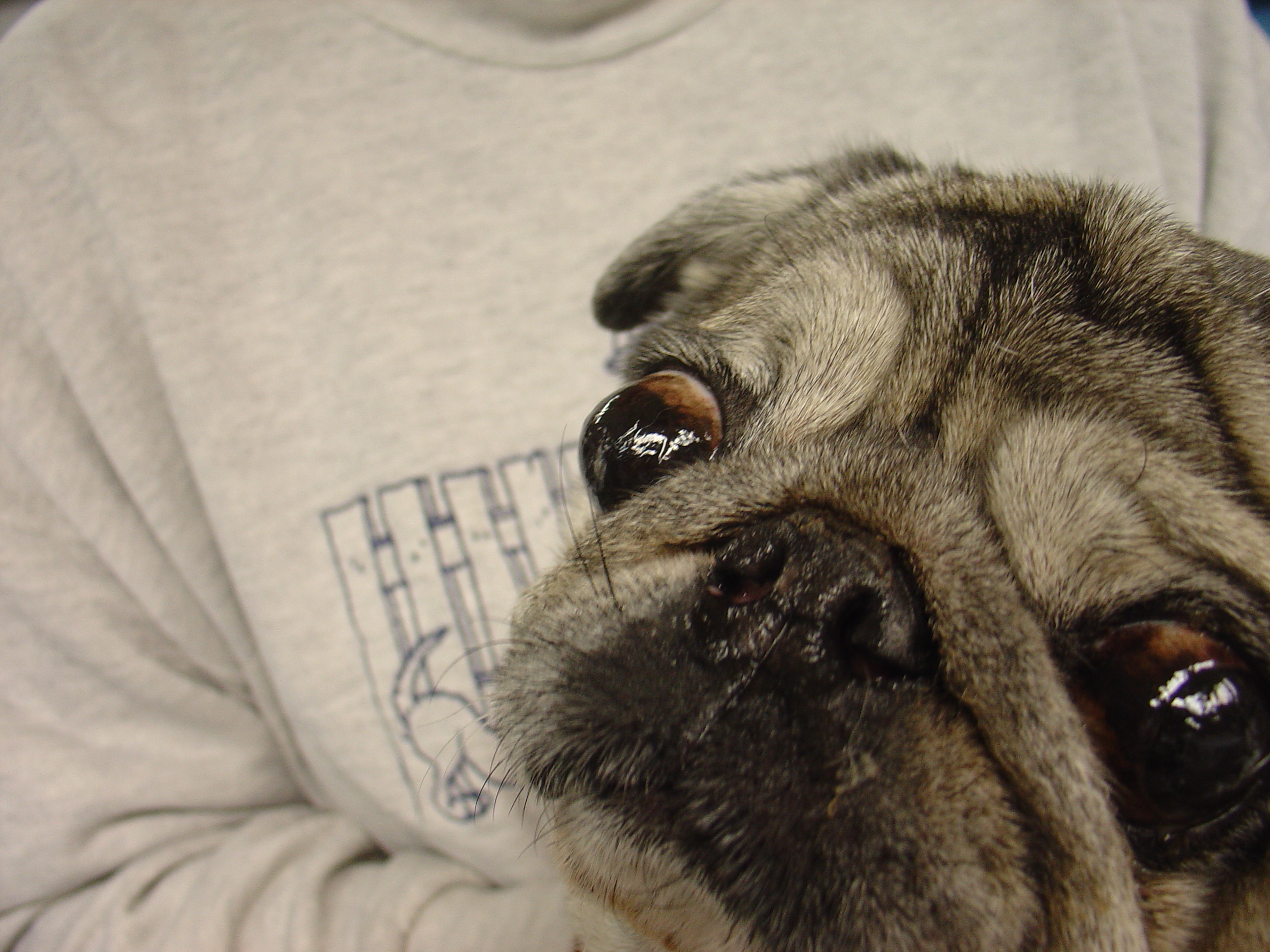
Exophthalmos in a pug

Non-airway problems associated with brachycephalia may include:

- Inflammation in skin folds
- Mating and birthing problems
- Malocclusion – misalignment of the teeth.
- Dental crowding
- Brachycephalic ocular syndrome
  - Ectropion/entropion – inward/outward rolling of eyelid
  - Macropalpebral fissure
  - Lagophthalmia – inability to close eyelids fully
  - Exophthalmos/eye proptosis – abnormal protrusion of the eye
  - Nasal fold trichiasis – fur around the nose fold rubs against the eye.
  - Distichiasis – abnormally placed eyelashes rub against the eye.
  - Poor tear production
  - Gastrointestinal problems

== See also ==
- Cephalic index – for lists of affected dog, cat, and other animal breeds
