= List of fictional dogs in live-action film =

This is a list of fictional dogs in live-action film and is a subsidiary to the list of fictional dogs. It is a collection of various non-animated dogs in film.

== Film (live-action) ==
Character	Breed	Source	Notes
Abu	Mixed breed	The Thief of Bagdad	The dog that the evil Jaffar turns the boy thief into.
Ace	German Shepherd	Ace of Hearts	About a K-9 dog accused of mauling a police suspect.
Albert	Great Dane	Live a Little, Love a Little	Greg's dog; an Elvis Presley movie about a photographer.
Alfie	Old English Sheepdog	Serpico	Frank's dog; about a police officer trying to fight police corruption.
Algonquin	Poodle	Elvira, Mistress of the Dark	Elvira's dog; about a famed horror hostess who goes to a stuffy town to claim her inheritance of a haunted house.
Ambrosius	Old English Sheepdog	Labyrinth	The family dog; about a woman's quest to reach the center of an enormous otherworldly maze.
Andrew	Biewer Terrier	Mary Poppins	The Lock family dog; about a magical nanny who comes to work for an unhappy family.
Angus	Bulldog	Mr. Magoo	About a myopic millionaire; based upon the cartoon character.
Anwar Sadat	Puggle	I Love You, Man	Sidney's dog; about a friendless guy who goes on a series of man-dates to find a Best Man for his wedding.
Argus	Irish Red and White Setter	Familiar Strangers	The family dog; about a four-day Thanksgiving family gathering.
Arthur	Jack Russell Terrier	Beginners	Oliver's adopted dog; about a young man who has to deal with his elderly father.
Asta	Wire Fox Terrier	Thin Man	Nick & Nora Charles' dog who helps the couple solve murders.
Atlas	Mixed breed	Topper Takes a Trip	Marion Kirby's dog; about a ghost and her dog, played by Asta
B'ar killer	Irish Wolfhound	Against a Crooked Sky	Russian's dog; about a woman who is kidnapped by a mysterious Indian tribe and her brother who hopes to rescue her.
Baby	Jack Russell Terrier	Clean Slate	Pogue's dog; about a private eye who suffers total amnesia every day and gets entangled in a murder case.
Babydoll	German Shepherd	Heavy Petting	About a K-9 dog accused of mauling a police suspect.
Backup	Pit bull	Veronica Mars	Veronica's dog; about a high school girl who solves mysteries.
Balto	Wolfdog	Balto	A half-wolf, half-husky stray.
Banjo	English Setter	Banjo	A young girl has her dog taken away and she runs away to find it.
Baxter	Border Terrier	Anchorman, Anchorman 2	Ron Burgundy's dog; frequently communicates with Ron through barks and wards off an angry bear.
Beethoven	St. Bernard	Beethoven	Adopted by his family, he is the series' protagonist dog.
Benji	Mixed breed	Benji	About a small dog who is adopted by his family.
Bimini	Yorkshire Terrier	Beverly Hills Chihuahua	Bimini is a gentle Yorkshire Terrier who appeared in Beverly Hills Chihuahua and its sequel.
Bingo	Collie mix	Bingo	About a runaway circus dog who saves the life of a young boy.
Boi	Yorkshire Terrier	High School Musical	Boi is Sharpay's dog who first appeared in High School Musical 2. He is portrayed by Manly "Little Prickles" Ortega, Kenny Ortega's dog.
Bonaparte	Poodle	Beau Brumell	About a poor soldier who befriends the Prince of York in the 1790s.
Bonkers (Bonkie)	Labrador Retriever	The World According to Garp	Garp's neighbor's dog who bites Garp.
Boomer	Golden Retriever	Independence Day	Family dog of Steven Hiller, Jasmine Dubrow, and Dylan Dubrow-Hiller.
Boscoe	Mixed breed	One Crazy Summer	Squid Calamari's collared dog.
Brandy	Pit bull	Once Upon a Time in Hollywood	Cliff Booth's pet who helps him and Rick Dalton kill Tex Watson and Susan Atkins
Bruiser	Chihuahua	Legally Blonde	Elle Woods' pet and partner.
Buck	Alaskan Malamute	Eight Below	One of Jerry Shepherd's dogs.
Buckley	Beagle	The Royal Tenenbaums	Dog belonging to Chas Tenenbaum and his two sons
Buddy	Golden Retriever	Air Bud	About a dog who has the uncanny ability to play basketball.
Buddy	Bloodhound	Cats & Dogs	The Brody family's former pet who is an agent of D.O.G. and is captured while chasing a cat.
Buddies	Golden Retriever	Air Buddies	Buddy's puppies, consisting of Budderball, B-Dawg, Mudbud, Buddha and Rosebud.
Bug	Boston Terrier	Strays	A stray dog befriends the protagonist Reggie and helps him in his plan to get revenge on his owner.
Buster	Black Labrador	The Aviator	The Hepburn family dog that sits on Howard Hughes' feet.
Butch	Anatolian Shepherd	Cats & Dogs	Lou's mentor.
Camille	Pomeranian	Hounded	The Van Dusen's dog; about a teenager who is hounded by a well-groomed tiny dog that actually turns out to be a beast.
Chance	American Bulldog	Homeward Bound: The Incredible Journey	The Hunter family dog, a remake of the 1963 movie The Incredible Journey based on the book by Sheila Burnford, voiced by Michael J. Fox.
Charlie	Bearded Collie mix	The Absent-Minded Professor	Professor Brainard's dog; about a college professor who invents an anti-gravity substance which a corrupt businessman wants for himself.
Charlie	Labrador Retriever	Joe Dirt	Brandy's dog; about a man looking for his parents who abandoned him at the Grand Canyon when he was a baby.
Cherokee	Golden Retriever	Scream 3	Sidney's dog; about a woman trying to escape the horrors of a prior horror movie.
Chestnut	Great Dane	Chestnut: Hero Of Central Park	About two former orphans who try to keep their loveable Great Dane a secret from their adoptive parents.
Chico	Australian Cattle Dog	Secret Window	Mort Rainey's dog; about a writer who is accused of plagiarism by a stranger who starts to terrorize him.
Chiffon	English Sheepdog	The Shaggy Dog	Wilby's reincarnation as a dog; about a boy who changes into a sheepdog and back again.
Chinook	Alaskan Malamute	Trail of the Yukon	A White Malamute dog that accompanies his master Kirby Grant who is a Canadian Mounty
Chloe	Chihuahua	Beverly Hills Chihuahua	About a dog who gets kidnapped in Mexico and has to escape from an evil Doberman.
Cho Cho	Briard	The Karate Dog	A talking dog who helps the police.
Chomps	Mixed breed	C.H.O.M.P.S.	Brian's dog; about a young inventor who creates a robotic dog that is part of a home protection system.
Chomp	Border Terrier	102 Dalmatians	One of Kevin's dogs.
Chopper	Golden Retriever	Stand By Me	Junkyard dog.
Christmas	Labrador Retriever	A Dog Named Christmas	Todd's dog; about a mentally challenged man living with his parents in the rural Midwest.
Chum	Labrador Retriever	Spanglish	The Clasky family dog; about a woman and her daughter who emigrate from Mexico to America where they start working for a family.
Clown	Old English Sheepdog	Billie	Billie's dog; about a 15-year-old tomboy who has track running skill that she teaches other track athletes.
Clue	Basset Hound	The Adventures of Mary-Kate & Ashley	Sidekick to the famous twins who helped solve mysteries.
Cofi	Rottweiler	Amores Perros (Mexican)	Octavio's dog; about a horrific car accident that connects three stories.
Colossus	English Bulldog	Van Wilder	Van Wilder's dog; about a rich kid who likes the college life but isn't serious about it.
Copper	Bloodhound	The Fox and the Hound	About a dog who forms an unlikely friendship with his natural enemy the fox.
Cora	Unknown	To Dance with the White Dog	Sam's vision of a dog; about a mysterious dog that the old man starts to see after his wife Cora dies.
Countess	Cocker Spaniel	Sharpay's Fabulous Adventure	Countess is a Cocker Spaniel who is Roger Elliston's dog. She fell in love with Boi when she met him.
Cujo	St. Bernard	Cujo	The rabid dog; about a family terrorized by the eponymous Cujo.
Daisy	Generic	Blondie	The family dog; about the Bumsteads, Dagwood and Blondie and their two children. (Based upon the comic strip.)
Daisy	Australian Shepherd	Show Dogs	Daisy is an Australian Shepherd who is Max's love interest.
Daisy	Beagle	John Wick	Wick's dog; about an ex-hitman who comes out of retirement to serve retribution on a Russian crime syndicate.
Daisy	Labrador Retriever	Gran Torino	Walt's dog; about a recently widowed Korean War veteran who is alienated from his family and angry at the world.
Daisy	Staffordshire Bull Terrier	Snatch	Vinny's dog; about a bunch of shady characters trying to track down a priceless stolen gem.
Danny Boy	German Shepherd	Danny Boy	Jimmy's dog; about a highly decorated war dog who returns home but is kidnapped by an animal abuser.
Dante	Yorkshire Terrier	Show Dogs	Dante is a haughty Yorkshire Terrier who competes in the Canini Invitational dog show.
Daphne	Poodle	Look Who's Talking Now	One of the talking dogs; about a street-wise mutt and a spoiled pedigree poodle who have to deal with human problems.
Dash	King Charles Spaniel	Young Victoria	The queen's dog; based on the early life and reign of Queen Victoria of the United Kingdom.
David	Poodle Miniature	Sabrina	Sabrina's dog; about a chauffeur's daughter who must sort out a tangled love affair by going to Paris.
Delgado	German Shepherd	Beverly Hills Chihuahua	About a dog who gets dog-napped in Mexico and has to escape from an evil Doberman.
Devil	German Shepherd	The Phantom	The Phantom's dog; about a masked crime-fighter based upon the comics.
Devon	Border Collie	A Dog Year	Jon's dog; about a guy suffering from a midlife crisis who takes in a dog that's crazier than he is.
Dewey	Irish Terrier	Firehouse Dog	The dog who teams up with a young kid to get the fire station back on its feet.
Diamond	Golden Retriever	Dog Gone	Owen's adopted dog (also titled Diamond Dog Caper); about a boy who battles a gang of bumbling thieves to rescue a dog carrying a fortune in stolen diamonds.
Digby	Old English Sheepdog	Digby, the Biggest Dog in the World	About an Old English Sheepdog who accidentally drinks a liquid growth formula and expands to gigantic proportions.
Diggs	German Shepherd	Cats & Dogs: The Revenge of Kitty Galore	arrogant, dimwitted, rebellious, impulsive, and egotistical German Shepherd who becomes an agent of D.O.G.
Digger	Borzoi	102 Dalmatians	One of Kevin's dogs.
Dog	Collie	Big Jake	Jacob's dog; starring Laddie, who played stunt double for Silver, won the 1971 PATSY Award for his performance in this film.
Dog	Australian Cattle Dog	Mad Max 2: The Road Warrior	Max's companion and one true friend.
Dogmatix (Idefix)	Terrier	Asterix	Obelix's minuscule dog.
Dolce	Pomeranian	Young Adult	Mavis' dog; about a fiction writer who returns to her home in Minnesota looking to rekindle a romance with her ex-boyfriend who is now married with kids.
Dolores	Pomeranian	Double Take	Freddy's dog; about a man who likes to keep his dog in a knapsack.
Domino	Dalmatian	102 Dalmatians	A Dalmatian puppy with dice patterned ears.
Dooley	Hound mix	The Misfits	Gay's dog; about a divorcée who falls for an over-the-hill cowboy in early-sixties Nevada.
Dorothy	Mixed breed	5 Flights Up	The Carver's dog; about an older couple who tangle with the notion of moving to a new apartment.
Dottie	Bichon Frise	Coming to America	McDowell family female dog.
Dougal	Great Dane	Little Lord Fauntleroy	The Earl of Dorincourt's pet and Ceddie's new friend; about an English earl whose life changes when he takes in the heir to his estate.
Drooler	Bullmastiff	102 Dalmatians	One of Kevin's dogs who drools.
Dude	Mongrel	Descendants	A dog who first appeared in the first installment in the musical fantasy adventure-comedy film series and was adopted by Carlos after the latter overcame his fear of dogs. Later in Descendants 2, he gains the ability to speak by eating a magical sweet Mal gives his owner.
Duke	Great Dane	Bathing Beauty	Willis' dog; about a contrived misunderstanding that leads to the breakup of a songwriter and his fiancé.
Duke	English Mastiff	The Quiet American	Alden Pyle's dog; about a love triangle between an English journalist, a CIA agent, and a young Vietnamese
Duke	Great Dane	Seven Pounds	Emily's dog; about a man with a fateful secret who sets out to change the lives of seven people.
Duke		The Swiss Family Robinson	
E. Buzz	Golden Retriever	Poltergeist	The Freeling's family dog; about a family whose house is occupied by supernatural forces.
Eddie	Labrador Retriever	The Fabulous Baker Boys	Jack's dog; about 2 brothers playing twin pianos at night clubs who improve their act with a singer.
Edison	English Sheepdog	Chitty Chitty Bang Bang	The family dog; about a wrecked racing motorcar in the early twentieth century..
Edward	Cardigan Welsh Corgi	The Accidental Tourist	Muriel Pritchet's unruly dog; about a writer of travel guides who tries to carry on with his life after his son is killed and his marriage crumbles.
Einstein	Catalan Sheepdog	Back to the Future	Doc Brown's dog; about traveling back in time.
Elway	Basset Hound	The Smurfs	The Winslow dog; about tiny blue Smurfs who are chased from their village by the evil wizard Gargamel and end up in New York City.
Elwood	Old English Sheepdog	The Shaggy D.A.	Wilby's transformation as a dog; about a lawyer who finds strange things happening to him.
Engels	Maltese	Hail, Caesar!	Gurney's dog; a fictional take on the real-life fixer, Eddie Mannix.
Ernie	Griffon Bruxellois	Sweet November	Sara's temporary dog; about an adman whose life changes when it gets involved with a free-spirited woman.
Evie	German Shepherd	We Think the World of You	Johnny's dog; about an aimless young man who is sent to prison and entrusts his dog to the care of his former lover.
Fang		Harry Potter	Hagrid's dog. In the books Fang is called a "boarhound" (Great Dane) but the role is played by a Mastiff in the Harry Potter films.
Fang	Mixed breed	Vampire Dog	Ace's dog; about a boy who unwittingly adopts a 600 year old talking vampire dog.
Fanto	Poodle	It All Came True	The Great Boldini's companion; about a crooked nightclub owner who blackmails his piano player to allow him to stay at his eccentric mother's boarding house.
Flealick	Jack Russell Terrier	Babe: Pig in the City	One of Babe's friends; about Babe the pig who has to go to the big city to save the farm. (Also in the film are dogs Alan, Nigel, Punk and Snoopy.)
Fluke	Golden Retriever	Fluke	The reincarnated human; about a workaholic who dies in an auto accident and comes back to life as a dog.
Flush	Cocker Spaniel	The Barretts of Wimpole Street	Elizabeth's dog; about the real-life romance between poets Elizabeth Barrett and Robert Browning.
Fly	Border Collie	Babe	Babe's companion; about a pig who befriends a dog that teaches him to herd sheep.
Francis	Mexican Hairless Dog	Superstar	Mary's dog; about a homely girl who wants to become a superstar by performing in her school's talent show.
Frank the Pug	Pug	Men in Black	An alien in disguise. Frank is also in the sequels and the 2007 movie "Frank".
Fred	Basset Hound	Smokey and the Bandit	Snow's dog, a comedy about buddies running a tractor trailer full of beer over county lines in hot pursuit by a sheriff.
Friday	Jack Russell Terrier	Hotel for Dogs	Andi and Bruce's dog; about 2 orphans who hide their dog at an abandoned hotel when their guardians forbid pets at home.
Geneviève	Labrador Retriever	Madeline	Madeline's dog; about an orphan girl who lives in Paris and attends a boarding school.
George	Wire Fox Terrier	The Devil to Pay	Willy's dog; about a free-spirited but lovable man who returns home penniless and falls in love.
George	Wire Fox Terrier	Bringing Up Baby	Susan's dog; about a paleontologist pursued by a flighty heiress and her pet leopard. Makes off with the bone; owned by Mrs. Elizabeth Carlton Random, Susan's aunt.
Gladstone	English Bulldog	Sherlock Holmes	Watson's dog; about Holmes and Watson's efforts to prevent the ritual murder of a woman.
Grace	Basset Hound	Kit Kittredge: An American Girl	Kit's dog, set in Cincinnati at the height of the Great Depression where a resourceful young girl helps her mother run a boardinghouse.
Greta	Rottweiler	Play Dead	Hester's gift to her niece; about a woman who uses her magic powers and a vicious Rotweiller dog to murder her relatives.
Greyfriars Bobby	Skye Terrier	Greyfriars Bobby	Auld Jock's loyal dog; about a dog who follows a farm worker who ultimately dies in poverty and is buried in Greyfriar's Kirkyard.
Guardian Dog	Generic	IF	An imaginary friend who resembles a dog superhero. He is voiced by Sam Rockwell.
Gus	Siberian Husky	Iron Will	Will's dog. about a guy who decides to join a cross country dogsled race.
Gypsy	Greyhound	Johnny Eager	Johnny's dog; about an ex-con tough-guy who wants to open a dog racing track while dating the D.A.'s daughter.
Hachi	Akita Inu	Hachi: A Dog's Tale	Based on the children's book Hachiko: The True Story of a Loyal Dog.
H. G. Wells	St. Bernard	Father Dear Father	The father's pet; about a writer of trashy thriller novels who finds himself bringing up his two irrepressible daughters.
Hank	Great Dane	The Truth About Cats & Dogs	Brian's dog; about a successful radio-show host with low self-esteem who asks her modeling friend to impersonate her when she is supposed to meet a handsome man.
Harvey	Golden Retriever	E.T. the Extra-Terrestrial	The family dog; about a meek and alienated little boy who finds a stranded extraterrestrial.
Hearsay	Sheepdog	The Firm	Mitch and Abigale's dogs; about a young lawyer in a law firm.
Hercules	English Mastiff	The Sandlot	Mr. Mertle's dogs; about a group of young baseball players during the summer of 1962.
Hintza	Rhodesian Ridgeback	A Far Off Place	Harry's dog. Survivors of a massacre must flee across the kalahari desert.
Hobo	German Shepherd	The Littlest Hobo	About a stray dog who wanders from town to town helping people in need. He was often given names by his many temporary owners.
Hooch	Dogue de Bordeaux	Turner and Hooch	Turner's dog; about a detective who adopts the dog of a dead man to help him find the murderer.
Hosehead	Mongrel	Strange Brew	Bob and Doug's dog; a comedy about two dimwit brothers and a murdering brewmaster.
Hubble	Border Terrier	Good Boy!	An intergalactic canine pilot who visits Earth to verify that dogs don't control the planet.
Hubert	Black and Tan Coonhound	The Duke	The heir to a fortune; about a dog Hubert inheriting an English country mansion.
Hubert	Bloodhound	Best in Show	Harlan Pepper's dog; about five dogs and their owners at the Mayflower Kennel Club Dog Show held in Philadelphia.
Hunter	Great Dane	Strays	A therapy dog helping the protagonist Reggie
Indiana	Alaskan Malamute	Indiana Jones and the Last Crusade	Indiana Jones' childhood dog, named after character-creator George Lucas' own Alaskan Malamute. The dog is only referenced in the movie, not seen.
Jack	Cairn Terrier	Lost & Found	Lila's dog; about a restaurant owner who is in love with his new neighbor and attempts to get her affections by kidnapping her dog and offering to help her find him.
Jack	Jack Russell Terrier	The Artist	Valentin's dog in the movie The Artist; about a silent movie star who wonders if the arrival of talking pictures will cause him to fade into oblivion; played by Uggie who won the 2011 Palm Dog Award for his performance.
Jack	Portuguese Podengo	The Lake House	The dog that Alex and Kate share; about two strangers who fall in love but are living in a different time.
Jackyl	Chihuahua	Dude Where's My Car?	Nelson's cannabis-loving dog; about two potheads who wake up from a night of partying and can't remember where they parked their car.
Jane	Fluffy puppy	The Young in Heart	A pet given to old lady Fortune, a family of con artists who are befriended by a rich old woman and from whom they hope to be inherit riches.
Jasper	Cocker Spaniel	Rebecca	Maxim de Winter's dog; about a self-conscious bride who is tormented by the memory of her husband's dead first wife.
Jed	Wolfdog	The Journey of Natty Gann	Nanny's wolf-dog; about a tomboy in the 1930s who runs away from her guardian to join her single father who is 2000 miles away.
Jennie	Sealyham Terrier	Higglety Pigglety Pop!	About a dog who is not content with having everything but must go out in the world to find something she doesn't have.
Jerry Lee	German Shepherd	K9	A police dog; about a mischievous drug-sniffy dog. Sequels include K-911 and K-9: P.I.
Jessie	Border Collie	Animal Farm	About animals on a farm who revolt against their human owner and end up with a tyranny, narrated by the dog.
Jip	Irish Wolfhound	Dolittle	A loyal dog who wears glasses; about a veterinarian with the ability to communicate with animals; based on the book series by Hugh Lofting.
Joey	Bloodhound	Fool's Parade	Captain "Doc" Council's dog; about three ex-convicts who hope to go straight and an evil prison official who wants to steal their money and kill them.
Johnny One-Eye	Mixed breed	Johnny One-Eye	Martin's dog; about a former gangster turned legitimate businessman who ends up in trouble.
Jonnie	Brittany	Ring of Bright Water	Mary's dog; about a man with a pet otter who moves into a rustic cottage overlooking the sea in Scotland where he meets a woman and her dog.
Junkyard	Boston Terrier	Race to Witch Mountain	The dog the kids befriend; about a Las Vegas cabbie who enlists the help of a UFO expert to protect two kids with paranormal powers from an evil organization.
Katie	Dalmatian	What Dreams May Come	The Nielsen's dog; about a death in the family... in fact several.
Kavik	German Shepherd	The Courage of Kavik the Wolf Dog	Andy's adopted dog; about the travails of a sled-dog (not really a wolf-dog) who finally finds a home.
Khyi Yang Po	Bearded Collie	The Shaggy Dog	The dog that bites Dave, transforming him into a dog; about a deputy district attorney who changes into a dog when excited, then back again when calm.
Kiki	German Shepherd	Kickboxer	Xian's loyal canine companion.
Lady	Basenji	Goodbye My Lady	Skeeter's dog; about an old man and a young boy living in the Georgia swamps who are brought together by the love of a dog.
Lassie	Rough Collie	Lassie Come Home	About a boy and his dog.
Laughing Gravy	Mixed breed	Laughing Gravy	Laurel and Hardy's dog; about two men who try to hide their pet dog from their mean-tempered landlord.
Lenny	Mixed breed	Lenny the Wonder Dog	A talking dog; about a mutt whose implanted microchip gives him special powers as he and a young boy go on a quest to save the world.
Lester	German Shepherd	Halloween	The Lindsay family dog; about a killer who gets out of a sanitarium to pursue is life's work; a remake of the 1978 thriller.
Lightning	Bloodhound	Racing Stripes	The Walsh family's bloodhound who is lazy and talks while sleeping.
Lincoln	Portuguese Podengo	Soccer Dog-The Movie	Clay's dog; about an adopted boy whose dog has an uncanny ability to play soccer.
Little Dipper	Dalmatian	102 Dalmatians	
Lloyd	Pug	Norbit	Mrs. Henderson's pet Pug dog; about a mild-mannered guy who is engaged to a monstrous woman and meets the woman of his dreams.
Lou	Beagle	Cats & Dogs	The Brody family dog; about the top-secret high-tech espionage war going on between cats and dogs.
Luath	Labrador Retriever	The Incredible Journey	About two dogs and a cat; based on the book Sheila Burnford.
Lucky	Mixed breed	Dr. Dolittle	The Doctor's dog; about a doctor who discovers he can talk to animals; based loosely on the children's book written by Hugh Lofting.
Lucky	St. Bernard	You Lucky Dog	The heir to his deceased master's fortune; about a dog psychiatrist who is famous for literally being able to read dog's minds.
Lucky	Border Collie	You Lucky Dog	Fashion designer Lisa's dog; about a sheep dog who helps rescue children trapped in a forest fire and brings them to safety.
Lucy	Labrador Retriever	Wendy and Lucy	Wendy's dog; about a woman who not only is down on her luck, but she also loses her dog.
Maggie	Labrador Retriever	The Wild River	The family dog; about a husband and wife and son on a white water rafting trip who encounter two men who turn out to be armed killers.
Maggie	Australian Shepherd	Strays	A stray dog befriending the protagonist Reggie and helping him in his plan to get revenge on his owner.
Marley	Labrador Retriever	Marley and Me	The Grogan family dog; about a man and his family's life during the thirteen years that they lived with their dog.
Marlowe	Husky	Cop Dog	Robby's dog; about a boy and his dad's dog who set out to solve the death of the young boy's father.
Matisse (aka Mike)	Border Collie	Down and Out in Beverly Hills	The family dog; about a rich but dysfunctional couple who save the life of a suicidal bum.
Max	Tibetan Mastiff	Man's Best Friend	The genetically altered dog; about a dog that turns from man's best friend into man's worst nightmare as he attacks everything that moves.
Max	Rottweiler	Show Dogs	Max is the main character from the film who works as a K-9 police dog and has a human partner called Frank Nicholas.
Max	Siberian Husky	Eight Below	One of Jerry Shepherd's dogs
Max	Belgian Sheepdog	Max	Kyle's dog; about a dog whose handler, a U.S. Marine in Afghanistan, is killed, and who then is adopted by the soldier's family.
Max	Belgian Shepherd	Max	About a military service dog returning from service in Afghanistan.
Max	Mixed-breed	How the Grinch Stole Christmas	The canine companion to the Grinch: Live action adaptation of Dr. Seuss’ How the Grinch Stole Christmas
Maya	Siberian Husky	Eight Below	The only female dog of Jerry Shepherd's dogs
Melba	Poodle (toy)	Five Golden Hours	Aldo Bondi's dog; about a petty crook who consoles wealthy widows until he falls in love with one of them.
Mike	Mixed breed	Bait	Ray's dog; about two men and a woman searching for gold in remote mountains.
Milo	Jack Russell Terrier	The Mask	Stanley Ipkiss' dog; about a bank clerk who is transformed into a manic super-hero when he wears a mysterious mask
Miss Agnes	Shih Tzu	Best in Show	Scott Donlan and Stefan Vanderhoof's dog; about five dogs and their owners at the Mayflower Kennel Club Dog Show held in Philadelphia..
Miss Skippy	Wire Fox Terrier	Midnight Alibi	The gift Vance gives Abigail (Old Doll); about a gambler who befriends an old lady who later supplies him with an alibi.
Missy	St. Bernard	Beethoven's 2nd	Beethoven's female partner.
Mogley	Border Collie mix	Dog Park	Andy's dog; about a guy who loses his dog when he loses his girl.
Monty	Mixed breed	The Hidden Room	Mrs. Riordan's dog; about a husband who plans a devilish revenge against his wife's lover.
Mooch	Terrier	Mooch Goes To Hollywood	About an ambitious dog who attempts to become a canine star after befriending Zsa Zsa Gabor.
Moreover,	German Wirehaired Pointer	The Biscuit Eater	About a dog who has a strong relationship with two twelve-year-old boys.
Moses	Unknown	Dogville	Chuck's dog; about a woman hiding from mobsters who arrives in the small town and is provided refuge in return for physical labor.
Moses	Chihuahua	Meet the Fockers	The Focker's dog; about a couple who decide to meet each other's family.
Mother Teresa	Newfoundland	Must Love Dogs	Sarah's brother's dog; about a teacher who looks in the personals ads for a change of pace and a relationship.
Mr. Beefy	Bulldog	Little Nicky	About which of Satan's three sons will succeed their father as ruler of Hell.
Mr. Jones	Small long-haired dog	The Long Voyage Home	Phyllis's dog; about a mysterious death and an amateur sleuth calling it murder
Mr. Smith	Wire Fox Terrier	The Awful Truth	Lucy's dog; about a married couple dealing with unfounded suspicions and each other's attempts to find new romance
Mr. Twixzle	Great Dane	Rent-a-Kid	The kids' dog; about a salesman who hatches a scheme to rent out the kids to prospective adoptive parents.
Muffin	Pomeranian	Screwed	Miss Crock's dog; about a chauffeur who kidnaps his rich boss's dog to hold it for ransom, but the plan goes awry.
Muffy	Cairn Terrier	Anatomy of a Murder	A beer-drinking dog; about a murder trial based on the novel by John D. Voelker under the pen name Robert Traver.
Murphy	Doberman Pinscher	They Only Kill Their Masters	The victim's dog; about a small-town sheriff attempts to uncover facts behind the killing of a pregnant woman by her Doberman pinscher.
My Little Darling	Cairn Terrier	Shall We Dance	Linda's dog; about a ballet dancer who chases after a tap dancer.
Nacho	Alaskan Malamute	The Lost Boys	Sam's dog; about two Arizonan brothers who move to California and end up fighting a gang of teenage vampires.
Nacho	Chihuahua	Nacho Chihuahua	Joe's dog; about a chihuahua who runs away from his owner to find his homeland, South of the Border (attraction).
Nanook	Alaskan Malamute	The Lost Boys	Sam's dog; about two Arizonan brothers who move to California and end up fighting a gang of teenage vampires.
Ned	Bulldog (American)	The Number 23	The dog that bit Walter's hand; about a man who becomes obsessed with a book that he believes was written about him.
Nelson	German Shepherd	The Little Hut	Lady Ashlow's dog; about a husband and wife, along with her male friend and her protective dog, marooned on an island where they try to untangle a love triangle.
Nerak	Scottish Terrier	The Watcher in the Woods	Ellie's puppy in the movie; about a family who moves to a country home where the young girls experience haunting events linked to the past.
Nevins	Terrier mix	The Cat in the Hat	The Waldens' pet dog; about two bored kids whose life is turned up-side-down when a talking cat comes to visit them.
Nikki	Malamute	Nikki, Wild Dog of the North	Andre's dog; about a dog separated from his owner in the rugged Canadian wilderness.
Oddball	Dalmatian	102 Dalmatians	A spotless Dalmatian puppy.
Oddball	Maremmano-Abruzzese Sheepdog	Oddball	A sheepdog is trained to defend a colony of little penguins from foxes on an island in Victoria, Australia.
Old Dan	Redbone Coonhound	Where the Red Fern Grows	One of Billy's dogs, (the other is Little Ann) about a boy and his quest for his own Redbone Coonhound hunting dogs.
Old Drum	Golden Retriever	The Trial of Old Drum	Charlie's dog; about an orphan dog that becomes a boy's best friend and is then forced to stand trial for killing a neighbor's sheep.
Old Yeller	Black Mouth Cur	Old Yeller	The family's dog who is bitten by a rabid wolf with a virus, before Travis forced himself to kill the dog.
Ole Rex	Mixed breed	Old Rex	A shaggy white dog; about a boy who nurses a stray dog back to health then runs away with him.
Ollie	Australian Kelpie	The Sundowners	Sean's dog; about an Australian outback family.
Otis	Pug	The Adventures of Milo and Otis	About the roving misadventures of a dog and a cat.
Otis	Jack Russell Terrier	Son of the Mask	Tim's dog; about a man who finds himself in a predicament when his dog stumbles upon the mask of Loki.
P. B.	Bull Terrier	Babe 2: Pig in the City	One of the talking animals.
Papi	Chihuahua	Beverly Hills Chihuahua	Papi is a Chihuahua who has a crush on Chloe and has married her since Beverly Hills Chihuahua 2.
Pard	Mixed breed	High Sierra	Roy's dog; about an ex-con who is hired by his old boss to help a group of inexperienced criminals to carry out a robbery.
Pard	Mixed breed	I Died a Thousand Times	Roy's dog, a remake of the 1941 movie; about an ex-con who helps a group of inexperienced criminals to carry out a robbery.
Patsy	Old English Sheepdog	Storm in a Teacup	Mrs. Hegarty's dog; about a politician whose disregard for a dog is publicized by a reporter.
Peewee	Great Dane	Breakfast for Two	Mr. Blair's dog; about a Texas debutante who tries to reform a bankrupt playboy.
Peek	Chinese Crested	Cats & Dogs	A dog agent.
Pencil	Beagle	Year of the Dog	Peggy's first dog; about a secretary whose life changes in unexpected ways after her dog dies.
Pete	Labrador Retriever	The Silent Call	Guy's dog; about a dog who is left behind and takes on 1,000-mile journey to rejoin the family in Los Angeles.
Petey	Pit Bull	Our Gang	The kids' dog, a series of American comedy short films about a group of poor neighborhood children and the adventures.
Philippe	Papillon	Show Dogs	Philippe is a Papillon who speaks with a French accent and asks Max for advice on how to win the contest so the latter one can rescue Ling-Li.
Pijo	Bichon	Doggie B	Dances throughout the film and, with the help of special effects, successfully completes multiple flips on-screen.
Pip	Beagle	Spooky Buddies	A beagle puppy who is Joseph's dog and became a ghost when he was turned to stone by the Halloween Hound.
Pilot	Golden Retriever	The Retrievers	The Lowry family dog; about a dog who tries to retrieve her puppies that were given away at birth.
Plugger	Border Collie mix	A Million Ways to Die in the West	Anna's companion in a rambling comedy in the American West.
Pluto	Dalmatian	The Truman Show	Truman's neighbor Spencer's dog.
Poe	Pit Bull Terrier, American	Wonder Boys	The Gaskill's dog; about an English Professor who tries to deal with the various problems that his friends and associates involve him in.
Pongo and Perdita	Dalmatians	101 Dalmatians	The Dearly's dogs; about two Dalmatians and their 15 puppies.
Popper	Maltese	The Goldfinch	Dog initially belonging to Xandra, but later taken by Theodore Decker. Often referred to as Popchik or Popcyk.
Poppy	Chihuahua	Mars Attacks!	Nathalie Lake's dog; about Martians who surround the planet with an armada of flying saucers.
Poppy	Chihuahua	Easy Virtue	The family's annoying, barking dog; about a glamorous American widow trying to fit in with her husband's old English manored family.
Porthos	Great Pyrenees	Finding Neverland	Sir James Matthew Barrie's dog; about J.M. Barrie's friendship with a family who inspired him to create Peter Pan.
Precious	Poodle	The Silence of the Lambs	Jame Gumb's dog; about an FBI agent hunting a serial killer.
Prince	German Shepherd	The Case of the Howling Dog	Clinton Foley's dog; about lawyer Perry Mason who is hired to make a will but ends up solving a murder.
Prince Dansker	Great Dane	Death of a Champion	The champion; about an effort by detectives to discover who killed a famous show dog.
Prince Terrien	Terrier mix	Bridge to Terabithia	The dog that Jess gave Leslie; about a young boy whose life is changed after meeting a new friend.
Puffy	Border Terrier	There's Something About Mary	Magda's dog; about a guy who meets a girl from high school where his prior date with her was an embarrassing disaster.
Puppy Paws	Golden Retriever	Santa Buddies	Son of Santa Paws.
Quark	Jack Russell Terrier	Honey, I Shrunk the Kids	Wayne's dog; about an inventor who accidentally shrinks and his neighbor's kids whose voices can only be heard by the dog.
Quigley	Pomeranian	Quigley	The reincarnation of Archie; about a guy who dies and comes back as a dog to make up for his mistakes.
Ragsy	Terrier mix	Fog Over Frisco	Val's dog; about two half-sisters from a respected San Francisco family whose life styles diverge.
Rainy	German Shepherd	Cool Dog	Jimmy's pet, bout a dog who is left behind when a family moves, then finds his way home in New York City.
Rambo	English Bulldog	Mannequin	Captain Maxwell's dog; about an underemployed artist who gets a job as a department-store window dresser and falls in love with a mannequin that comes to life.
Red	Unknown	Red	Avery's dog; about one man's revenge after his beloved dog dies in an attempted robbery.
Red Dog	Australian Kelpie	Red Dog	The dog who unites the people of Dampier, Western Australia.
Reggie	Border Terrier	Strays	The protagonist who wants revenge after being abandoned by his owner
Rembrandt	Border Collie	Woman on the Run	Eleanor's dog; about a woman who eludes police while searching for her husband, a witness to a murder.
Reno	Briard	Top Dog	Jake's partner; about a cop and his dog who go after a Neo-Nazi group.
Rex	Golden Retriever	Cybermutt	Nino's dog; about a dog that is badly injured during his act of heroism rebuilt with super powers.
Rhapsody in White	Poodle	Best in Show	Sherri Ann and Leslie Ward Cabot's dog; about five dogs and their owners at the Mayflower Kennel Club Dog Show held in Philadelphia.
Rimshot	Jack Russell Terrier	Ernest Scared Stupid	Ernest's dog; a horror comedy about a screwball who unleashes an ugly troll that plots to turn children into wooden dolls.
Rin Tin Tin	German Shepherd	Frozen River (and many others)	Always comes to the rescue. (See Rin Tin Tin)
Rocco	Pit Bull	The Drop	Bob's adopted dog; about a bartender who finds himself at the center of a robbery gone awry.
Rocks	Mixed breed	Look Who's Talking Now	One of the talking dogs; about a street-wise cross breed and a spoiled pedegree poodle who have to deal with human problems.
Rodney	Doberman Pinscher	It Shouldn't Happen to a Dog	Julia's well-trained dog; about a reporter whose life becomes complicated when he meets up with a woman in a tavern.
Rontu	Mixed breed	Island of the Blue Dolphins	Karana's adopted dog; about a young Native American girl who swims back to her abandoned home island to be with her brother.
Rover	Collie	Rescued by Rover	The dog who leads its master to his kidnapped baby; a British silent short.
Rowdy	Mixed breed	Summer of the Monkeys	Jay's companion; about a boy who hopes to buy a horse with the reward for returning lost circus chimps.
Ruff	Briard	Dennis the Menace	The family dog; about a boy who causes problems for everyone.
Rufus	St. Bernard	Fluke	Fluke's friend; about a workaholic who dies in an auto accident and comes back to life as a dog.
Runt	Mixed breed Terrier	Runt	A stray dog is adopted by 11 year-old girl Annie Shearer and who competes in agility course championships with her.
Rusty	German Shepherd	For the Love of Rusty	Danny's companion, the third of eight movies about a dog and his young companion.
Rusty	Beagle	Rusty: The Great Rescue	The family dog; about a courageous canine who protects his family from bad guys.
Sadie	Border Collie	The Conjuring	Sadie was the Perron family's dog who detected the presence of evil in the family's new home.
Sam	Parson Russell Terrier Rough	It Happened on Fifth Avenue	Mr. McKeever's dog; about a homeless man who lives in a mansion while the owner has gone south for the winter.
Sam	Old English Sheepdog	Cats & Dogs	A dog agent.
Sam	Rough Collie	Hondo	Hondo's dog; about a U.S. cavalry scout who comes to the aid a woman and her son living in the midst of warring Apaches.
Sam Jr.	Beagle	Sam Steele and the Junior Detective Agency	Sam's dog; about a young boy who forms his own private detective agency to emulate his father.
Samantha	German Shepherd	I am Legend	A post-apocalyptic science fiction story with Will Smith as the lead.
Sammy Davis Jr. Jr.	Border Collie	Everything Is Illuminated	A seeing-eye dog; about a Jewish American who tries to find the woman who saved his grandfather during World War II.
Sandy	Airedale Terrier	Annie (1976, 1977, 1982, 2014)	Annie's dog; about an orphan girl taken in by a billionaire.
Santa Paws	Golden Retriever	Santa Buddies	Santa's dog in the fourth installment of the Air Buddies spin-off series.
Savage Sam	Bluetick Coonhound	Savage Sam	Old Yeller's son; about the hound helping find children who were snatched by a band Apache.
Saxon	German Shepherd	Hot Fuzz	A police dog in the Sanford Police Service, works alongside PC Bob Walker in the movie (the second in the Three Flavours Cornetto Trilogy).
Scoot	German Shepherd	Scoot & Kassie's Christmas Adventure	Kassie's dog; about friends and a dog who organize a holiday fundraiser but must protect the cash from crooks.
Scraps	mixed breed	A Dog's Life	Charlie Chalin's dog; about a dog who helps a tramp and a dance hall singer survive in the city.
Scraps	Airedale Terrier	Airplane II: The Sequel	Jimmy Wilson's dog that boards a shuttle to the Moon.
Scud	Bull Terrier	Toy Story	Sid Phillips' dog
Shadow	Golden Retriever	Homeward Bound: The Incredible Journey	Jamie's dog, a remake of the 1963 movie based on the book by Sheila Burnford.
Shane	German Shepherd	Radio Flyer	The family dog; about two brothers who imagine that their Radio Flyer wagon can fly and that in it they can escape their tormenting stepfather.
Shasta	Siberian Husky	Snow Buddies	Adam's sled dog; about young pups who accidentally get shipped to Alaska in an ice-cream truck.
Shadow	Alaskan Malamute	Eight Below	One of Jerry Shepherd's dogs.
Shelly	Dachshund	Wiener Dog Nationals	The family dog, a family who adopts a runt of a dachshund from a shelter enters it in the nation's greatest wiener dog race.
Shep	German Shepherd	My Dog Shep	Danny's dog; about an unwanted orphan who decides to run away with his dog.
Shep	Rough Collie	The Painted Hills	Prospector Jonathan's faithful companion; about a guy who strikes gold and whose greedy partner attempts to lay claim on the find
Shep	Golden Retriever	Airplane!	Rex Kramer's welcoming committee.
Sherlock	Mixed breed	Sherlock: Undercover Dog	Billy's talking dog; about a boy and his detective dog who rescue a kidnapped detective and catch the bad guys.
Shiloh	Beagle	Shiloh and its sequels	Marty's dog; about the adventures of a boy and his dog.
Shorty	Siberian Husky	Eight Below	One of Jerry Shepherd's dogs.
Skeletor	Greyhound	50/50	Adam's dog; about a young journalist's struggle with a rare cancer.
Skip	Jack Russell Terrier	My Dog Skip	Willie's childhood dog; about a boy and his dog in a small sleepy Southern town.
Skipper	Welsh Corgi	Robinson Crusoe	The captain's dog in a loose adaptation of Daniel Defoe's classic novel.
Sniffer	Bloodhound	Air Buddies	Sheriff Dan's dog who lost his sense of smell years ago. He later regains it after getting sprayed by a skunk.
Snookums	Yorkshire Terrier	The Muppets Take Manhattan	Owned by Mr. Skeffington and Rowlf's pet Yorkshire Terrier dog, adopted at a pet shop in New York City, in the dog aisle. She prefers the rubber Wall Street Journal than the rubber New York Daily News.
Snots	Rottweiler	National Lampoon's Christmas Vacation	Rocky and Ruby Sue's dog; about a family Christmas get-together that turns into a disaster.
Snowdogs	Siberian Husky	Snow Dogs	Dr. Brooks' dogs; about a dentist who inherits a team of sled dogs and has to learn the sled-trade or lose his pack to a crusty mountain man.
Snuffy	Cairn Terrier	Pal Joey	Joey's dog, a gift from Linda; about a second-rate, womanizing singer who meets a naive chorus girl.
Sonny	French Bulldog	Due Date	Ethan's dog; about a high-strung father-to-be who is forced to hitch a ride with an aspiring actor and his dog so he can see his child's birth.
Sonny	Bulldog	The Dogfather	An adopted dog who swallows a mafia don's ring and his best soldiers try and retrieve it.
Sounder	Redbone Hound	Sounder	The family dog, a coming-of-age story of a boy living in the Depression Era of the South.
Sparky	Bull Terrier	Frankenweenie	Victor's dog; about a boy who creates a machines that revives his dead dog.
Sparky	Jack Russell Terrier	Michael	Frank's dog; about three tabloid reporters who find out the Archangel Michael is on vacation living with an old woman.
Spike	Rottweiler	Alien 3	Thomas Murphy's dog who is a Xenomorph host.
Spike	English Bulldog	The Game Plan	Kingman's dog; about football player living the bachelor lifestyle who discovers that he has an 8-year-old daughter.
Sprinkles	Pug	Show Dogs	Sprinkles is a pug who is the biggest fan of Max. He is voiced by Gabriel Iglesias.
Spot	Bullmastiff	See Spot Run	about a mailman who takes in a stray only to learn that it is a trained FBI dog that has escaped from a witness protection program.
Spot	Africanis	Shaft in Africa	A dog that Shaft befriends trying to stop a human trafficking ring in Africa while.
Strongheart	German Shepherd	The Love Master, for example	Dog actor playing himself in many adventures.
Stoutheart	Saint Bernard	Snowball Express (Disney film 1970),	Cowardly & Clutzzy family dog moves with family to Colorado to open a ski resort!
Sucker	Mixed breed	They Shall Have Music	Frankie's companion; about a run-away boy who ends up at a music school for poor children.
Sweetie	Labradoodle	Diary of a Wimpy Kid: Dog Days	The family dog, based on the popular illustrated children's book series Diary of a Wimpy Kid: Dog Days.
Teddy	Great Dane	The Extra Girl	Sue's dog; about a small town girl who goes to Hollywood to escape marriage expecting to greeted with open arms but finds disappointment.
The Doberman Gang	Doberman Pinscher	The Doberman Gang	Robber dogs; about an ex-con and his friends who train dobermans to rob a bank.
The Dog	German Shepherd	Where the North Begins	A wild wolf-dog is domesticated and becomes a hero
The Mighty Celt	Greyhound	The Mighty Celt	Donal's favorite dog; about a 14-year-old boy who works in a greyhound racing kennel, hoping to own one of the dogs.
Thor	German Shepherd	Bad Moon	The family dog; about a man dealing with a werewolf curse.
Timmy	Australian Shepherd	Famous Five	A stray dog adopted by George and the fifth detective of the Famous Five
Toto	Cairn Terrier	The Wizard of Oz	Dorothy's dog; about a girl from Kansas and her dog who are off to see the wizard
Truman	Siberian Husky	Eight Below	Dewey's twin brother.
Tyko	Labrador Retriever	Life is Ruff	Calvin's dog; about a 13-year-old boy who adopts and trains a dog that proves to be more than anybody can handle.
Underdog	Beagle	Underdog	About a hound named Shoeshine who accidentally gains superpowers.
Valentine	German Shepherd	Year of the Dog	Peggy's second dog; about a secretary whose life changes in unexpected ways after her dog dies.
Verdell	Brussels Griffon	As good as it gets	Simon's dog; about a single mother, a misanthropic author, and a gay artist who form an unlikely friendship.
Wag	Welsh Springer Spaniel	Dean Spanley	Dean's being before being reincarnated; about a man who can't come to grips with the loss of his son.
Wellington	Poodle	The Curious Incident of the Dog in the Night-Time	Dog which dies immediately, which sets up the plot of the entire play.
White Dog	German Shepherd	White Dog	The dog Julie adopts; about a woman who finds out the dog has been trained to attack black people.
White Dog	Australian Shepherd	To Dance with the White Dog	Sam's dog; about an old widower whose wife returns as stray dog so she can keep an eye on him.
White Fang	Wolfdog	White Fang	A wolf-dog during the Klondike Gold Rush at the end of the 19th century in the book.
Whitey	Black Terrier	Boston Blackie	The flippant detective's dog; about a reformed jewel thief who solves crimes.
Wilby Daniels	Old English Sheepdog	The Return of the Shaggy Dog	About a magical ring that turns a man into a sheepdog.
Wildfire	Bull Terrier	It's a Dog's Life	The narrator is the dog telling his life story from the streets of the Bowery to a life of luxury.
Winky	Norwich Terrier	Best in Show	Gerry and Cookie Fleck's dog; about five dogs and their owners at the Mayflower Kennel Club Dog Show held in Philadelphia.
Winn-Dixie	Picardy Shepherd	Because of Winn-Dixie	Opal's canine friend; about a mischievous dog who befriends a lonely young girl in a new town and helps her make new friends.
Wolf	German Shepherd	My Pal Wolf	A young girl finds an AWOL army dog and goes to Washington to see if you she can keep it.
Won Ton Ton	German Shepherd	Won Ton Ton, the Dog Who Saved Hollywood	The ersatz Rin Tin Tin; about a woman who goes to Hollywood in 1924 to become an actress but the dog that followed her becomes the star.
Woofer	Mixed breed	The Adventures of Ociee Nash	Ociee's dog; about a 9-year-old girl whose father sends her to live with her straight-laced Aunt Mamie in North Carolina.
Yellow	Golden Labrador	Far From Home: The Adventures of Yellow Dog	Angus' dog; about a boy and his dog who become stranded when turbulent waters capsize their boat.
Zip	Australian Cattle Dog	The Last of the Dogmen	Lewis Gates' dog, Zip, saves his life by leading the horse when Lewis, having fallen off, hangs on to the reins, keeping him from falling off a cliff.
Zowie	Husky mix	Pet Sematary Two	Drew's dog; about a young family with a terrible secret in the backyard.

== See also ==
- List of fictional dogs in animated film
