= Fang (disambiguation) =

A fang is a long, pointed tooth found in many animals, notably mammals, snakes, and spiders.

Fang(s) or The Fang may also refer to:

== Geography ==
- Fang (town), in Thailand
- Fang County, in Shiyan, Hubei, China
- Fang, Iran, a village in Razavi Khorasan Province, Iran
- Fang District, a district of Chiang Mai province, Thailand
- Annapurna Fang, in Nepal, a peak in the Annapurna Massif
- Fang Ridge, on Ross Island, near Antarctica
  - The Fang, the highest point of the ridge
- The Fang (frozen waterfall), Vail, Colorado, US

== Languages ==
- Fang language, a Bantu language of the Central African Fang people
- Fang language (Cameroon), a Southern Bantoid language

== People ==
- Fang people, in Central Africa
- Fang (surname), a Chinese surname and unisex given name
- Fang (alchemist) (fl. 1st century B.C.), Chinese woman alchemist

=== Given name ===
- Chen Fang (rower) (born 1993), Chinese rower
- Fang Liu (born 1962), Chinese attorney and first woman to be Secretary General of the International Civil Aviation Organization
- Fang Wong (born 1948), US Army officer
- Fang Wu (born 1990), Taiwanese singer-songwriter
- Fang-Yi Sheu (born 1971), Taiwanese-American dancer

== Arts and entertainment ==
=== Books and comics ===
- Fang: A Maximum Ride Novel, a novel by James Patterson
- Fang (Harry Potter), Hagrid's pet dog in the Harry Potter series
- Fang (comics), a Marvel Comics character
- Fangs, a webcomic by Sarah Andersen

=== Fictional characters ===
- Fang, the main character in the indie video game Goodbye Volcano High
- F.A.N.G. (Street Fighter), in the video game series Street Fighter
- Fang (cat), the cat sidekick of Mona the Vampire
- Fang Brothers, two palace guards in the 16th-century Chinese novel Investiture of the Gods
- Fang the Sniper, a villain in the Sonic the Hedgehog series
- Fang, a mascot for the Arizona Rattlers
- Fang, a wolf zoanthrope in the video game and manga Bloody Roar
- Fang, a character in the Disney animated series Dave the Barbarian
- Fang, a secret agent dog on the television show Get Smart
- Fang, a main character in Maximum Ride
- Fang, Phyllis Diller's comedy routine husband
- Fang, a spider-headed villain in Teen Titans
- Fang, a shark character in the animated series Total Drama
- Cardinal Fang, a character in Monty Python's Spanish Inquisition sketch

=== Film ===
- Fang (2018 film), an American horror film written and directed by Adam R. Steigert
- Fang (2022 film), an American horror film written and directed by Richard Burgin

=== Music ===
- Fang (band), a California punk band
- Fangs (album), by Falling Up, 2009
- "Fangs", a song by Man Man from On Oni Pond, 2013

=== Other ===
- F.A.N.G, a vehicle in the G.I. Joe: A Real American Hero 25th Anniversary toy series
- Fangs: The Saga of Wolf Blood, a 1991 Enix home computer game
- Fangs, a version of the role-playing game supplement Foes (RuneQuest), published in 1980

== Astronomy ==
- Fáng (房) or Room, a Chinese constellation
- Fang, the primary component of the star Pi Scorpii

== Other uses ==
- Diamondback Energy (stock symbol FANG), an American energy exploration company
- FAANG or FANG, an acronym for the Big Tech companies Facebook, Amazon, (Apple), Netflix, and Alphabet/Google
