= Redbone Coonhound =

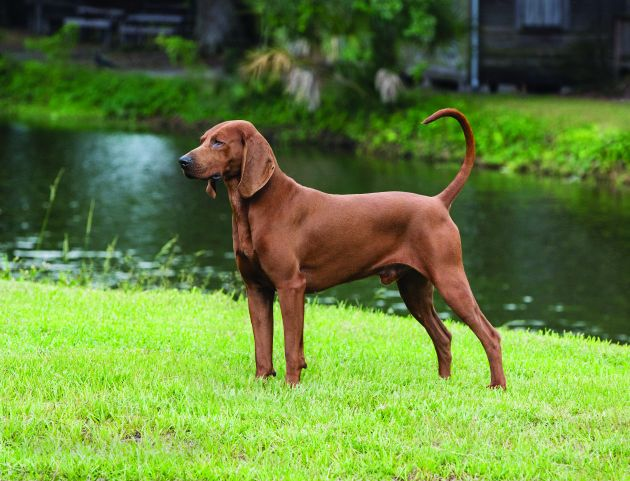
- An adult male
- Origin: United States
Traits
Height	Males	22–27 in (56–69 cm)
	Females	21–26 in (53–66 cm)
Weight	Males	50–70 lb (23–32 kg)
	Females	45–65 lb (20–29 kg)
- Coat: short and dense
- Color: solid red or chestnut; white is allowed on the paws and chest
Kennel club standards
- United Kennel Club: standard

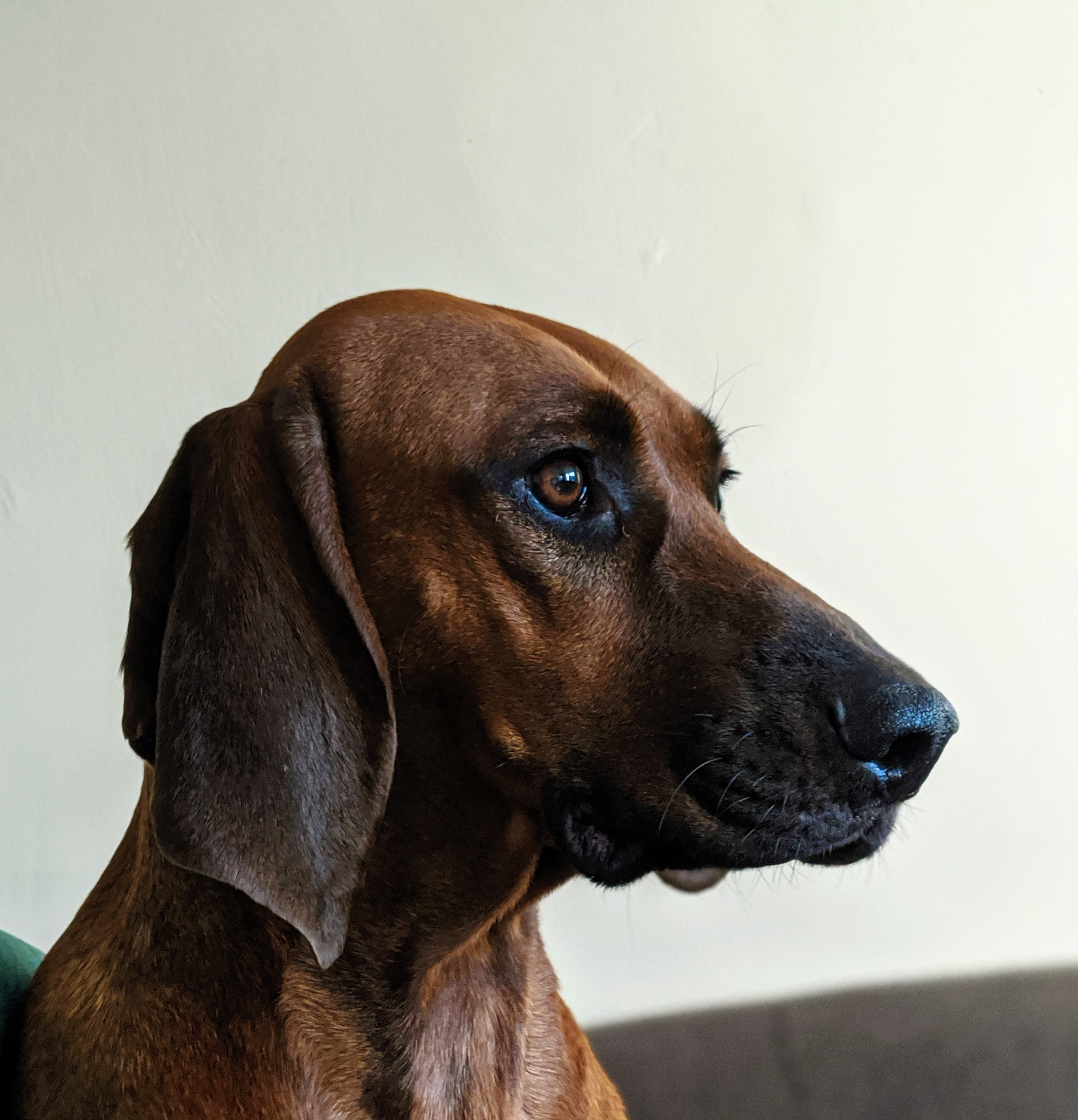
A two-year-old male with black masking on the muzzle

The Redbone Coonhound is an American breed of hunting dog. As a coonhound, the Redbone is primarily a hunter of small game that hide in trees, such as raccoons, opossums, and squirrels, but is also capable of handling big game like bears and cougars. Its hunting strategy is to tree wild game where hunters can then shoot the target, rather than directly hunting and subduing the prey.

The breed dates back to pre-Civil War from the Southern United States, and its foundation stock derives from bloodhounds and foxhounds brought by immigrants from Scotland. Unlike other coonhounds which are primarily bred for hunting skill rather than appearance, the Redbone is characterized by its rich red coat in addition to its ability to track game trails for longer than other breeds ("cold nose").

It has been registered with the United Kennel Club since 1902, and with the American Kennel Club since 2010. In popular culture, the breed is best known from the 1961 children's novel Where the Red Fern Grows by Wilson Rawls.

== History ==
In the early 19th century, Scottish immigrants brought red-colored foxhounds to Georgia, which would later become the foundation stock of today's modern-day Redbone. Around 1840, Irish-bred Foxhound and Bloodhound lines were added. These additional lines, particularly the Irish Foxhound, may be the origin for the white markings occasionally found on the chest and feet of modern Redbones.

While the Redbone name comes from an early breeder, Peter Redbone of Tennessee, much of the work to create the breed was done in Georgia. The foundation stock belonged to George F.L. Birdsong of Georgia, given to him by Dr. Thomas Henry in the 1840s.

Some of the earliest Redbones were referred to as "Saddlebacks" due to having a black saddle-like marking on the back on top of the all red coat. By the beginning of the 20th century, it was replaced by an uninterrupted red tone, and the name "Redbone Coonhound" was adopted.

Over time, breeders followed a selective program that led to a coonhound that was adept at treeing wild-game, was courageous against larger animals such as bear and cougars, agile enough to track in the mountains or in the marsh, and could swim if necessary. Though designed with raccoon hunting in mind, they are capable of hunting larger game like bears and cougars.

The Redbone Coonhound was recognized by the United Kennel Club in 1902, becoming the second coonhound breed after the Black & Tan to gain recognition and was recognized by the American Kennel Club in 2010.

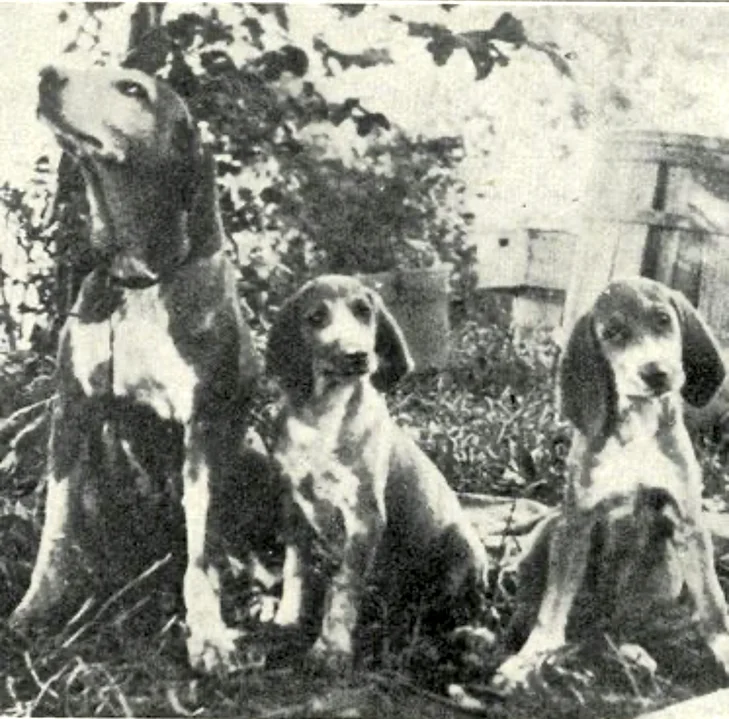
Early Redbones

== Description and appearance ==
The Redbone Coonhound has a lean, muscular, well proportioned build. The body type is typical to the coonhounds subgroup, with long straight legs, a deep chest, and a head and tail that are held high and proud when hunting or showing. The breed is one of the most uniform coonhounds in terms of size and appearance.

The Redbone Coonhound has brown eyes and a face that is often described as having a pleading expression. The dog's eyes may be dark brown to hazel, but a darker color is preferred. The coat is short and smooth against the body, but coarse enough to provide protection to the skin while hunting through dense underbrush. The coat color is always a rich red, though a small amount of white on the chest, between the legs, or on the feet is sometimes seen. The nose is often black and prominent, with black on the muzzle and around the eyes, called "masking," not uncommon. The ears are floppy and will most likely extend to nearly the end of the nose if stretched out. Their large paws are described as cat-like, being compact and well-padded to adapt to different terrains. Dewclaws are common, but are considered a fault for breed standard.

As coonhounds that rely on treeing prey, Redbones have a loud bay, or howl, and its voice is described as being "sweet."

Males stand some 22–27 in (56–69 cm) at the shoulder, with females slightly shorter at 21–26 in (53–66 cm). Weight should be proportional to the size and bone structure of the individual dogs, with a preference towards leaner working dogs rather than heavier dogs. Generally, weights range from 45 to 70 lb (20 to 32 kg).

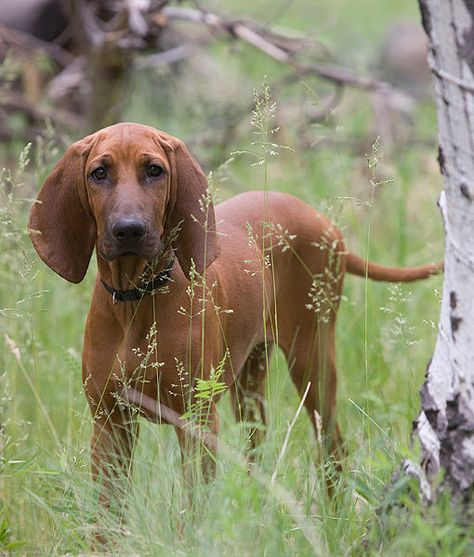
A female in the field

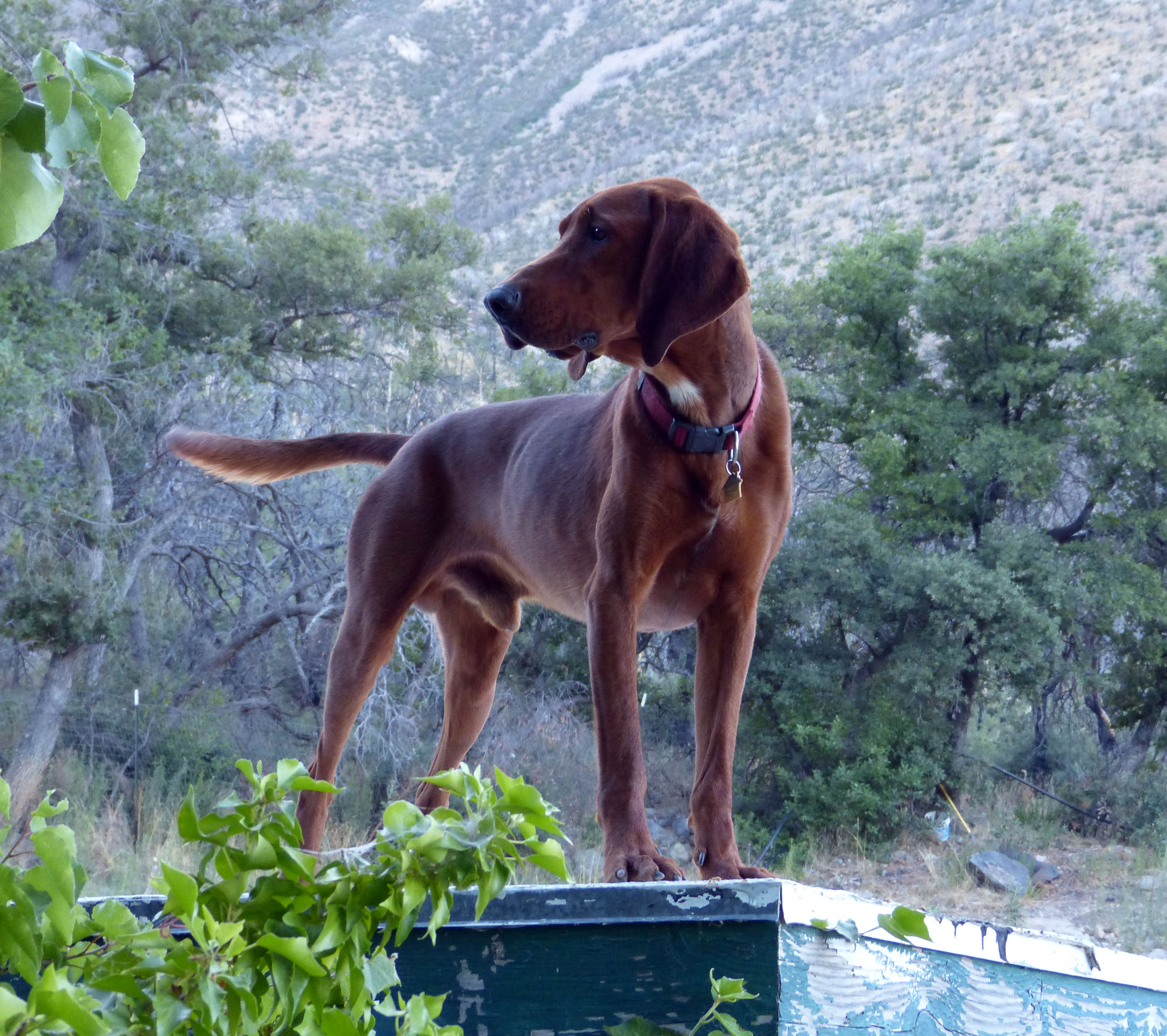
Tracking

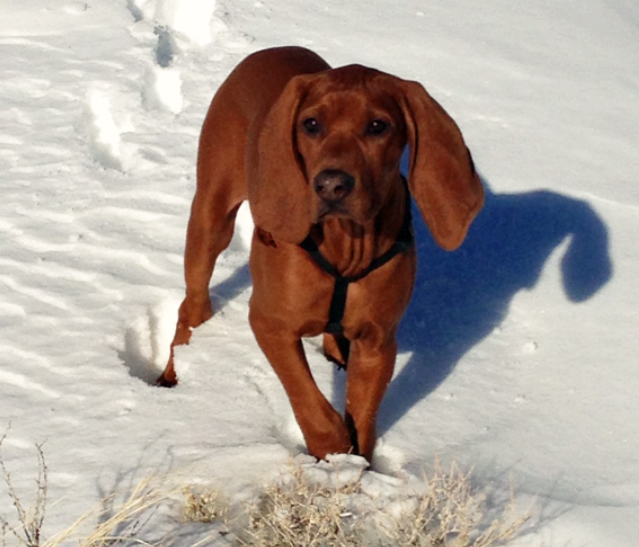
Young dog in the snow

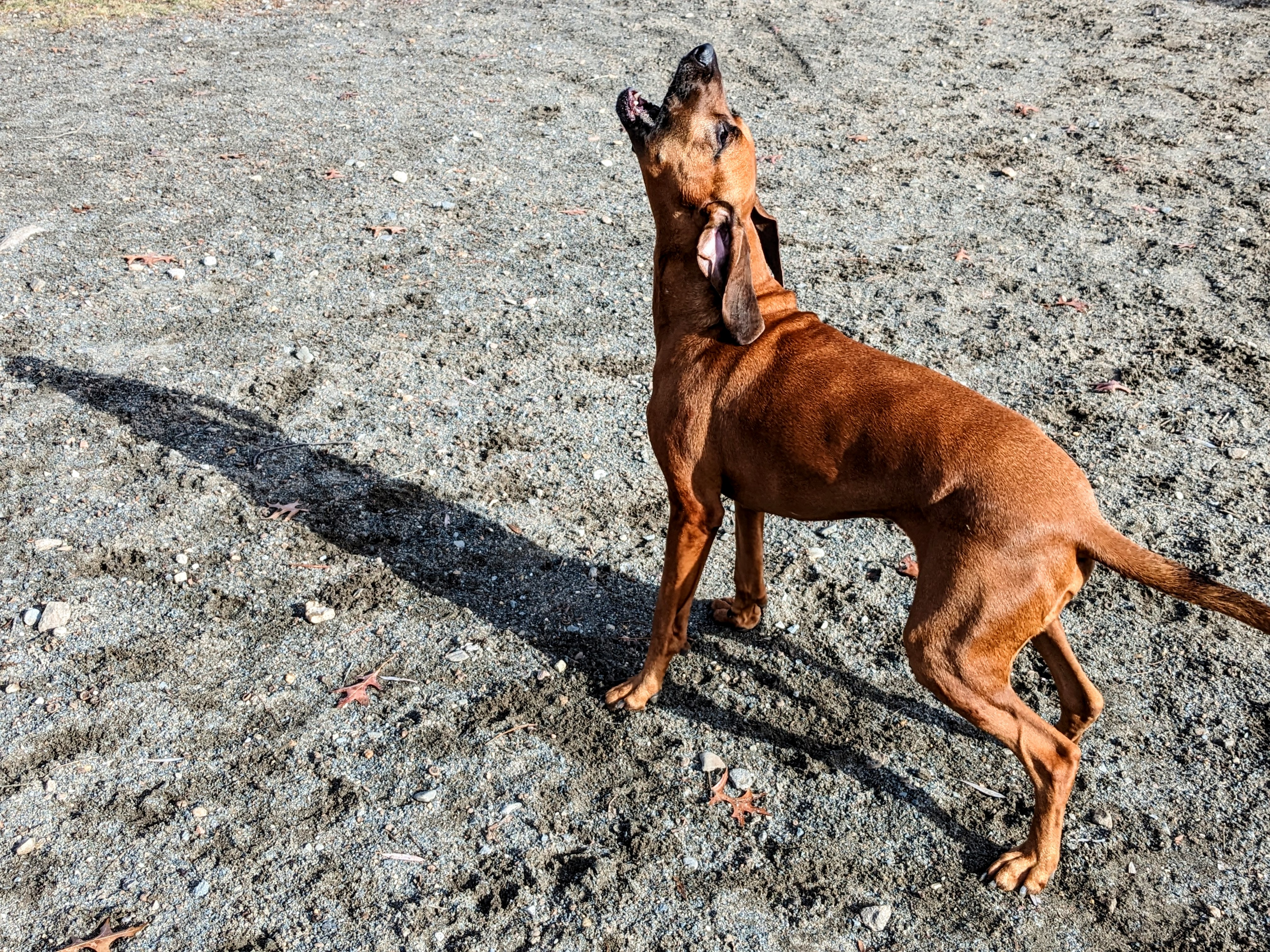
Treeing

== See also ==
- List of dog breeds
- Coonhound health
