= List of fictional dogs in animated film =

This is a list of fictional dogs in animated film and is a subsidiary to the list of fictional dogs. It is a collection of various animated dogs in film.

== Film (animation) ==
Name	Breed	Film title	Notes
Arrow	Generic	The Point	Accompanies his master Oblio when Oblio is banished to the Pointless Forest. The subject of a minor hit song from the soundtrack of the movie called Me and My Arrow.
Balto	Wolfdog	Balto	A husky/Arctic wolf hybrid. Based on the true story of Balto.
Barky Marky	Bulldog	Tiny Toon Adventures	About a group of young cartoon characters who attend a school called Acme Looniversity to be the next generation of Looney Tunes characters
Barnyard Dawg	Basset Hound	Walky Talkly Hawky	A Looney Tunes cartoon about Foghorn Leghorn.
Belka and Strelka	Samoyed terrier mix	Space Dogs	A Russian computer-animated film about two Soviet space dogs.
Bimbo	Generic	Betty Boop	Betty's companion; about a curvaceous Jazz age flapper.
Bitzer	Sheepdog	Shaun the Sheep (British)	Shaun's friend; about an anthromophic sheep and farm associates.
Bodi	Tibetan Mastiff	Rock Dog	
Bolivar	St. Bernard	Donald Duck	
Bolt	White Shepherd	Bolt	About a small white dog who thinks he has super powers having spent his entire life on the set of a television show.
Bruno	Bloodhound	Cinderella	Cinderella's dog; based upon the fairy tale.
Bruno	Bloodhound	The Triplets of Belleville	Champion's dog; about an elderly woman who goes on a quest to rescue her grandson who has been kidnapped by the French mafia.
Buster	Dachshund	Toy Story series	Andy's pet dog; about children's toys having an adventure.
Butch	Bulldog	Mickey Mouse	Pluto's nemesis.
Buttons	German Shepherd	Animaniacs	A protective dog of Mindy who keeps getting in trouble.
Canine	Greater Swiss Mountain Dog	Glenn Martin, DDS	The family dog; about a man who takes his family on a cross-country road trip to strengthen the family bond.
Carface V. Malone	Staffordshire Bull Terrier	All Dogs Go to Heaven	Carface is a former business partner of Charlie, the film's protagonist. He betrays and kills Charlie, resulting in him being sent to Heaven.
Charkie	Cocker Spaniel	Curious George	Steve and Betsy's dog in the children's books, animated movies, and animated TV series; about a brown monkey who is brought from his home in Africa by "The Man with The Yellow Hat" to live in a big city
Charlene	Cocker Spaniel	Open Season 2	Rufus' girlfriend in the animated movie; about a rag-tag army of animals against the hunters.
Charlie B. Barkin	German Shepherd	All Dogs Go to Heaven	Charlie reunites with Itchy and plots his revenge against Carface by setting up a rival business.
Charlie Dog	Half Collie	Little Orphan Airedale	Porky Pig's dog.
Chester	Jack Russell Terrier	Looney Tunes	Spike's cohort.
Chief	Irish Wolfhound	The Fox and the Hound	About a red fox and a hunting dog who renew their friendship.
Cooler	Beagle	Pound Puppies and the Legend of Big Paw	Leader of the Pound Puppies; based on a line of toys from Tonka.
Copper	Bloodhound	The Fox and the Hound	A hunting dog who befriends a red fox named Tod.
Daisy	Rough Collie	Rover Dangerfield	A love interest of Rover; about a showgirl's dog who gets abducted and ends up working on a farm.
Dante	Xoloitzcuintle	Coco	Miguel's pet dog and friend. He is later revealed to be an alebrije who takes the form of a normal dog outside the Land of the Dead.
Desert Flower	Yellow Coonhound	The Good, the Bad, and Huckleberry Hound	A Native American maiden hound, the daughter of the chief and the love interest, and later wife, of Huckleberry Hound.
Dinah	Dachshund	Mickey Mouse	Pluto's girlfriend in the Mickey Mouse movies; produced by Walt Disney.
Dodger	Jack Russell Terrier	Oliver & Company	Leader of Fagin's gang. A story based on the book Oliver Twist by English author Charles Dickens.
Dog	Border Collie	Footrot Flats	In the comic strip and animated movie; about a dog who thinks he's intelligent and tough but is actually soft and cowardly.
Dogfather	Generic	The Dogfather	The top dog, a parody of the film The Godfather.
Droopy	Basset Hound	Droopy	A meek dog with a deadpan voice.
Dug	Golden Retriever	Up	A dog who previously worked for Charles Muntz before meeting Carl Fredericksen, who adopts him following Muntz's death. Dug is equipped with a specialized collar that allows him to speak human language.
Duke	Sheepdog	Barnyard	The sheep's watchdog; about farm animals on their own. The animated TV spinoff was called Back at the Barnyard.
Duke	Mixed breed	The Secret Life of Pets	Max's cohort; about a dog whose leisure life is turned upside down when his owner brings home an unkempt mongrel.
Eddie	Generic small dog	Rover Dangerfield	Rover's best friend in the animated movie; about a showgirl's dog who gets abducted and ends up working on a farm
Einstein	Great Dane	Oliver & Company	A member of Fagin's gang in the animated movie, a dog story based on the book Oliver Twist by English author Charles Dickens
Eugene the Jeep	Unknown	Popeye	A character presumed to be some type of dog in the comic strip and animated movies, a mysterious animal with magical abilities. The name "Jeep" was adopted by GIs in WW II for their 4-wheel utility vehicle (officially abbreviated GP for General Purpose vehicle) because it was small, versatile and could solve seemingly impossible problems.
Ferdinand	Dachshund	Tom and Jerry: The Movie	Aunt Figg's overweight skateboarding dog.
Fido	Generic	Bobby Bumps	Bobby's dog in the early animated movie shorts.
Fifi	Poodle	Open Season 2	Roberto's companion; about a rag-tag army of animals against the hunters.
Fifi the Peke	Pekingese	Mickey Mouse	Pluto's girlfriend and Minnie Mouse's pet.
Francis	Bulldog	Oliver & Company	A member of Fagin's gang; a dog story based on the book Oliver Twist by English author Charles Dickens.
Fritz	Generic	Koko the Clown	Koko's dog in the early animated movie.
Gelert	Irish Wolfhound	Gelert	A dog of legend; about Prince Llywelyn and his faithful hound in old Wales.
Georgette	Poodle	Oliver & Company	Foxworth family's poodle; a dog story based on the book Oliver Twist by English author Charles Dickens.
Gidget	Pomeranian	The Secret Life of Pets	Dog with an unnamed owner; has a crush on Max.
Gigi	Alien experiment	Lilo & Stitch	Gigi is an artificially created alien experiment who resembles a Shih Tzu. She was introduced in the television series Lilo & Stitch: The Series and later appeared in the film Leroy & Stitch.
Goddard	Robot dog	Jimmy Neutron: Boy Genius	about a boy genius who creates gadgets; the 2001 movie led to the 2002 TV series The Adventures of Jimmy Neutron, Boy Genius
Goofy	Generic	Mickey Mouse universe	Friend of Mickey Mouse, a dog with human characteristics in contrast to Pluto, who is portrayed as a pet; produced by Walt Disney
Goopy Geer	Generic	Merrie Melodies	A character in the short animated movie; about a tall, lanky anthropomorphic dog who sings and dances his way through a musical world.
Gromit	Generic	Wallace and Gromit and sequels	Wallace's companion; is about an absent-minded inventor and his companion, an anthropomorphic intelligent dog (claymation).
Ham and Ex	St. Bernard	I Haven't Got a Hat	Twin pups; is about a school talent show featuring Porky Pig and other cartoon characters.
Hank	Beagle	Paws of Fury: The Legend of Hank	An anthropomorphic beagle who aspires to be a samurai.
Hector	Bulldog	The Sylvester and Tweety Mysteries	Granny's bulldog and Tweety's bodyguard.
Hundley	Dachshund	Curious George	A dachshund who lives in Ted's apartment.
Itchy Itchiford	Dachshund	All Dogs Go to Heaven	Charlie's cowardly friend; where Charlie reunites with Itchy and plots his revenge against Carface by setting up a rival business.
Jenna	Siberian Husky	Balto	Balto's love interest; is based on a true story.
Jerry the Tyke	Generic	Jerry the Tyke (British silent film)	Created by Sid Griffiths and inspired by the American animated Felix the Cat.
Jack	German Shepherd	The Adventures of Jack and Oggy Dogs	William's dog. He teaches Oggy how to be like him.
Jock	Scottish Terrier	Lady and the Tramp	A friend of Lady; about an American Cocker Spaniel who lives with a refined upper-middle-class family and a stray called Tramp.
K-9	Martian dog	Marvin the Martian	Marvin's dog in Looney Tunes.
Kyle	Mutant dog	Despicable Me	Gru's dogabout; is about a criminal mastermind who uses orphan girls to further his grand scheme.
Lady	Cocker Spaniel	Lady and the Tramp	About a Cocker Spaniel who lives with a refined upper-middle-class family and a stray called Tramp.
Lafayette	Basset Hound	The Aristocats	A farm dog and Napoleon's companion; about a family of aristocratic cats who need the help of an alley cat after they are kidnapped.
Little Brother	Generic	Mulan	Mulan's dog; about a Chinese maiden who takes her father's place in the army and becomes one of China's greatest heroes.
Loyal Heart Dog	Generic	The Care Bears Movie	Based on the characters created by American Greetings card company.
Luiz	Bulldog	Rio and sequel Rio 2	The dog that releases Blu and Jewel from chains; is about a macaw who takes off on an adventure to Rio de Janeiro.
Marc Anthony	Bulldog	Feed the Kitty	A leading character in animated movies such as featuring Marc Antony and Pussyfoot.
Marmaduke	Great Dane	Marmaduke	The Winslow family dog; is about a big dog that gets into trouble.
Max	Old English Sheepdog	The Little Mermaid	Prince Eric's dog; is about a precocious mermaid who journeys to the surface and falls in love with a handsome human.
Max	Generic	How the Grinch Stole Christmas	The Grinch's dog; is about the residents of Whoville preparing to celebrate Christmas.
Max	Jack Russell Terrier	The Secret Life of Pets	Katie's dog; is about a dog whose leisure life is turned upside down when his owner brings home an unkempt mongrel called Duke.
Max Goof	Generic	Mickey Mouse universe	son of Goofy
Meathead	Generic	Screwy Squirrel	The victim of Screw's antics; is about a brash and erratic squirrel who inflicts various forms of torture on his enemy.
Mr. Peabody	Beagle	Mr. Peabody & Sherman	About the time-traveling adventures of an advanced intelligent, clever dog and his adopted son.
Moongchi (Jacob)	Border Collie	Underdog (aka A Dog's Courage (2018))	About the story of abandoned dogs
Mr. Weenie	Dachshund	Open Season series	
Mutt Potter	Bloodhound	Tom Sawyer	An unfortunate character in a variation on Mark Twain's story, The Adventures of Tom Sawyer.
Nana	St. Bernard	Peter Pan	A nanny for the Darling family; based on the book by James Barrie.
Napoleon	Bloodhound	The Aristocats	A farm dog and Lafayette's friend; about a family of aristocratic cats who need the help of an alley cat after they are kidnapped.
Odie	Generic	Garfield: The Movie	Garfield's canine pigeon.
Olive	Jack Russell Terrier	Olive, the Other Reindeer	Tim's dog; is about a dog who replaces an injured reindeer so Christmas won't be canceled.
Ozzie	Pug	Epic	Professor Bomba's one-eyed, three-legged dog; is about a 17-year-old girl who is shrunk and lost in a forest where a battle between the good and evil biota is taking place.
Oggy	Border Collie	The Adventures of Jack and Oggy Dogs	Julia's dog. She falls in love with Jack.
Patou	Basset Hound	Rock-A-Doodle	The narrator; is about a little boy who learns that the crowing of Chanticleer, the rooster, did not make the sunrise as everyone thought.
Percy	Pug	Pocahontas	Ratcliffe's dog; is about an English soldier and the daughter of an Algonquin chief who shares a romance.
Pluto	Bloodhound-Pointer mix	Mickey Mouse universe	The pet of Mickey Mouse; produced by Walt Disney.
Pongo and Perdita	Dalmatian	One Hundred and One Dalmatians	The father and mother dogs; about the travails of two Dalmatians and their puppies.
Pooka	King Charles Cavalier Spaniel-mix	Anastasia	The stray dog found by Anastasia, loosely based on an urban legend that the youngest daughter of the Russian Tsar survived assassination.
Puddy the Pup	Generic	Terrytoons]] shorts	A white dog with a black ear in the various cartoons by Terrytoons.
Pudgy	Generic	Betty Boop	Betty's companion; about a curvaceous Jazz age flapper.
Raffles	Border Collie	Rover Dangerfield	A friend of Rover's; is about a showgirl's dog who gets abducted and ends up working on a farm.
Rex	Pembroke Welsh Corgi	The Queen's Corgi	About a corgi named Rex, who gets lost and tries to find his way home
Rita	Saluki	Oliver & Company	A member of Fagin's gang, a dog story based on the book Oliver Twist by English author Charles Dickens.
Roberto	Basset Hound	Open Season 2	Fifi's companion; is about a rag-tag army of animals against the hunters.
Rover	Blue Heeler	Pets United	A group of spoiled pets joins forces to save their city from evil.
Rover	Basset Hound	Rover Dangerfield	Connie's dog; is about a showgirl's dog who gets abducted and ends up working on a farm.
Rowf	mixed breed	The Plague Dogs	About the escape of two dogs from a research station.
Rowlf the Dog	Generic	The Muppet Show	A puppet dog originally created by Jim Henson.
Rufus	Wire Fox Terrier	Open Season 2	Charlene's boyfriend; about a rag-tag army of animals against the hunters.
Rusty	Generic	Home on the Range	The sheriff and Buck's best friend; about a mismatched trio of dairy cows who must capture an infamous cattle rustler for his bounty.
Rowdy Boy	Border Collie	Rowdy Boy and Bryan's Epic Adventures	A boy named Bryan and a yellow dog named Rowdy Boy go on awesome road trips to rescue 5,000 children in many countries from the evil teacher Miss Nancy.
Sam Sheepdog	Briard	A Sheep in the Deep (and others)	A dog guarding sheep; about Sam Sheepdog who combats Ralph Wolf.
Scamp	Schnauzer	Lady and the Tramp II: Scamp's Adventure	Son of Lady and Tramp; about a Cocker Spaniel, a stray, and their pup.
Scraps	Generic	Corpse Bride	Victor's dog and resident of the Land of the Dead.
Scud	Bull Terrier	Toy Story	Sid's dog and enemy to the toys
Slinky	Slinky toy	Toy Story (and sequels)	Based on the passé springy toy
Smedley	Generic	Chilly Willy	Adversary to Chilly Willy; about a penguin and friends living in Alaska.
Snoopy	Beagle	A Boy Named Charlie Brown	1969 animated musical comedy-drama movie based on the comic strip Peanuts
Snowplow	Generic	Nine Dog Christmas	The leader of the group; is about nine homeless canines who take the place of Santa's sick reindeer.
Snowy	Fox Terrier	The Adventures of Tintin (Belgian)	Tintin's dog; is about a reporter and his dog.
Sparky	Bull Terrier	Frankenweenie	Victor's dog; is about a boy who creates a machine that revives his dead dog.
Spike	Bulldog	Tom and Jerry	The stern but occasionally dumb dog.
Spike	Bulldog	Looney Tunes	Chester's cohort in the animated movies.
Spike	Bull Mastiff	Sinbad: Legend of the Seven Seas	The ship's dog; is about the sailor of legend traveling to the end of the world to save the life of a prince.
Spots	Mixed breed	Isle of Dogs	Atari's lost dog.
Steele	Alaskan Malamute	Balto	The villain of the movie and Balto's egoistic rival, based on a true story.
Stubby	Bull Terrier	Sgt. Stubby: An American Hero	The film is based on the real-life Stubby, a stray dog who becomes a hero of World War I.
Tito	Chihuahua	Oliver & Company	A member of Fagin's gang; a dog story based on the book Oliver Twist by English author Charles Dickens.
Toby	Basset Hound	The Great Mouse Detective	Basil's dog, a parody of Sherlock Holmes based on the children's book series Basil of Baker Street by Eve Titus.
Tock	Generic	The Phantom Tollbooth	Milo's companion; is about a boy and his dog who go from live-action to animation as his toy car transports them to the enchanted Kingdom of Wisdom.
Tramp	Schnauzer	Lady and the Tramp	Tramp is one of the two eponymous characters of the film. He is a stray who ends up falling in love with Lady, an American Cocker Spaniel who lives with a refined upper-middle-class family.
Trouble	Alaskan Klee Kai	Trouble	About a dog fought over to gain the inheritance of his late master.
Trusty	Bloodhound	Lady and the Tramp	A friend of Lady.
Tulip	German Shepherd	My Dog Tulip	Ackerley's dog; is about a man who rescues a dog and how they become best friends.
Tyke	Bulldog	Tom and Jerry	Spike's son.
Wylie Burp	Bloodhound	An American Tail: Fievel Goes West	A bloodhoud sheriff in the Old West.
Zero	Ghost dog	The Nightmare Before Christmas	Jack Skellington's ghostly dog.
