= Briard =

French breed of dog

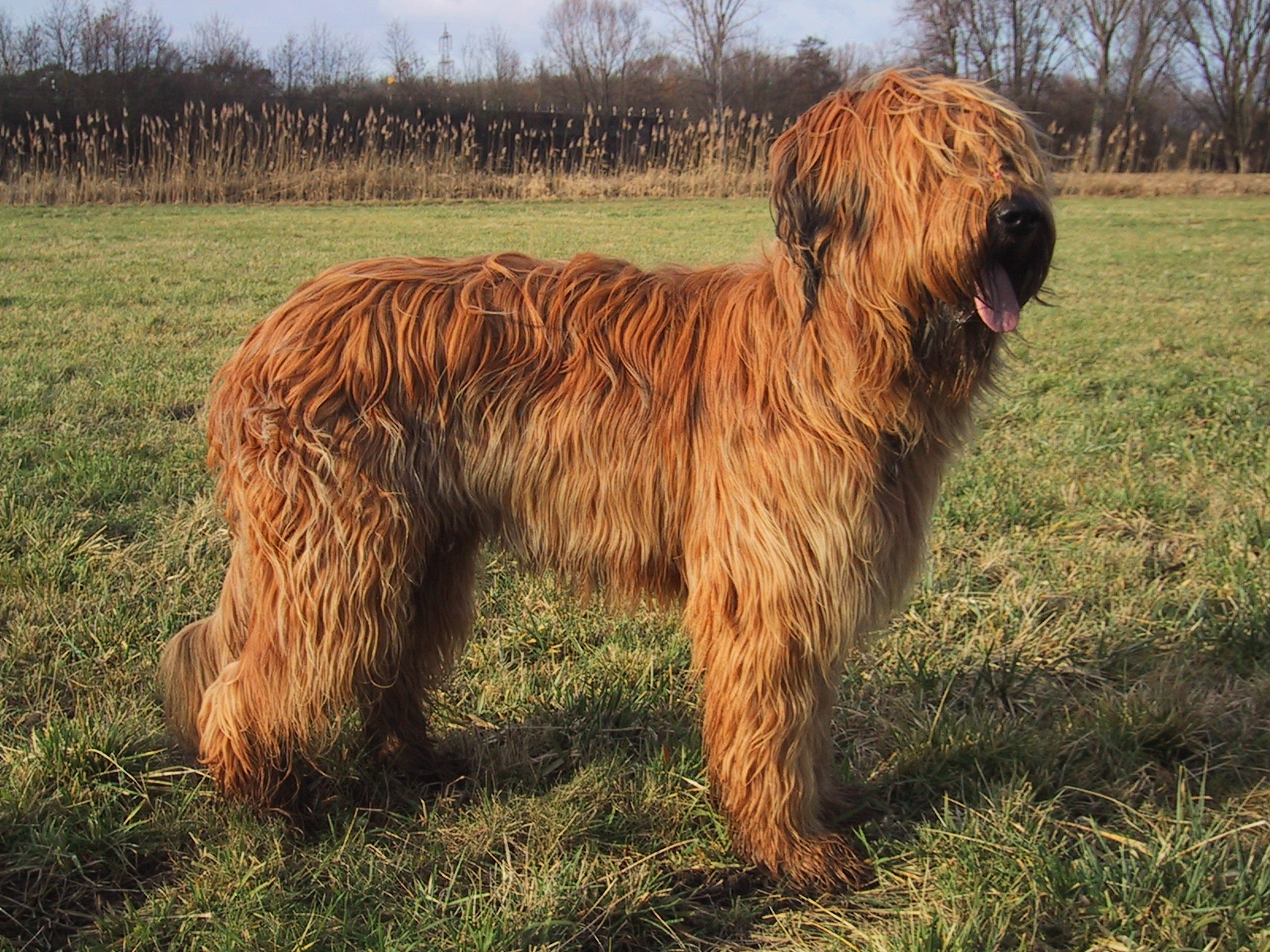
- Other names: Berger de Brie; Chien de Berger français de Plaine; Chien de Brie
- Origin: France
Traits
Height	Males	62–68 cm (24–27 in)
	Females	56–64 cm (22–25 in)
- Coat: long, slightly wavy, goat-like
- Color: solid black, fawn, grey or blue; fawn overlaid with black
Kennel club standards
- Société Centrale Canine: standard
- Fédération Cynologique Internationale: standard

The Briard or Berger de Brie (Note: Briard: pronounced [bʁijaʁ]; Berger de Brie, plural Bergers de Brie: pronounced [bɛʁʒe də bʁi]) is a French breed of large shepherd dog, traditionally used both for herding sheep and to defend them. It was in the past also known as the Chien de Berger français de Plaine.

It was first shown in 1863, at the first Paris dog show; the first Briard to be registered in the Livre des Origines Françaises, the national stud-book, was Sans Gêne in 1885.

== History ==
The Briard originated in, and is named for, the Brie historic region of north-central France, where it was traditionally used both for herding sheep and to defend them. The first written mention of the shepherd dogs of Brie is thought to be in the Cours complet d'agriculture of Jean-Baptiste François Rozier, who in 1783 wrote that the "chien de Brie" was long-haired and usually black; (Note: "... le poil long sur tout le corps; le noir est la couleur dominante") that in the open plains there was little danger from wolves, and so the dogs were used more for herding than for defence; (Note: "Dans les pays de plaine, & découverts, où l’on n’a rien à craindre des loups, le chien de berger, plus connu sous le nom de chien de Brie, est plutôt le conducteur, que le défenseur du troupeau") and that shepherd dogs had the task of preventing the sheep from straying into crops or vineyards where they might cause damage. (Note: Il ... défend les blés, les vignes, que les moutons auroient bientôt dévastés, s’il leur étoit permis de vaguer çà & là.; for reasons that are not clear, several sources including the FCI standard date this mention of the Berger de Brie to 1809. Rozier died in 1793; the third volume of his Cours complet d'agriculture was published in 1783.) Pierre Mégnin, writing in 1895, clearly distinguishes the short-haired Chien de Beauce – the modern Beauceron – from the long-haired Chien de Brie or Briard. In 1896, Mégnin was among those who founded the Club des chiens de berger français.

The Berger de Brie was first shown at the first Paris dog show in 1863, where a bitch named Charmant took a prize. The first Briard to be registered in the Livre des Origines Françaises, the national stud-book for dogs, was Sans Gêne, winner of a gold medal at the Paris show in 1885. A breed standard was drawn up in 1897, in which two varieties were described: one with a woolly or sheep-like coat, the other with a coat more similar to that of the goat; the woolly type later disappeared. In 1909 a breed society, Les Amis du Briard, was formed.

Breed numbers fell during the First World War; any dog thought suitable for military use was sent to the front. The breed society resumed its activities in 1923, and a rival breed association was formed at about the same time; in 1935, this last organised the first single-breed show for the Berger de Brie, with seventy-eight participants. Numbers again fell sharply under the Nazi occupation of France during the Second World War. After the war the two breed clubs merged under the name Club des Amis du Briard.

The Berger de Brie was fully recognised by the Fédération Cynologique Internationale in 1954.

Partly as a consequence of the mechanisation of agriculture and resulting rural depopulation of the post-War years, the Berger de Brie came to be commonly kept as a companion dog. In the 1970s and 1980s, its numbers increased substantially: annual registrations in the Livre des Origines Françaises rose from 317 in 1970 to 905 in 1975, to 4101 in 1980 and then to a peak of 6364 in 1986, after which they fell precipitously; at one point the breed club had over 6000 members, more than any other French breed association at any time. Disagreements within the association resulted in its expulsion from the Société Centrale Canine; a new breed society, the Association du Berger de Brie, was recognised in 1989. In 1996, ten European breed associations in nine countries joined to form the Union Européenne du Berger de Brie.

Congenital hereditary retinal dystrophy was identified in Briard dogs in Sweden. In 2001, blindness caused by a disease similar to Leber congenital amaurosis was partially reversed in three Briard puppies using gene therapy. A study in 2024 found a median longevity for the Briard of 12.6 years, close to the average of 12.5 found for all dogs.

== Characteristics ==
The coat is long – no less than 7 cm – and thick and harsh like that of a goat; it may be solid black, grey, blue or fawn, or fawn overlaid with black; greying is seen to a variable extent. Dogs stand some 62 to 68 cm at the withers, bitches about 56 to 64 cm. An unusual characteristic of the breed is the double dewclaw on the hind legs; the breed standard specifies a single or absent dewclaw as a disqualifying fault.

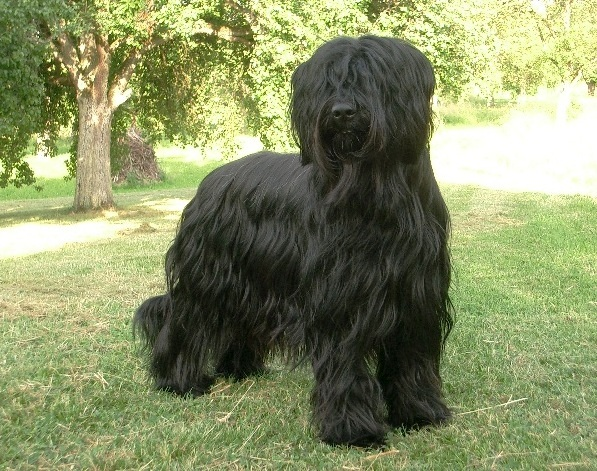
Black

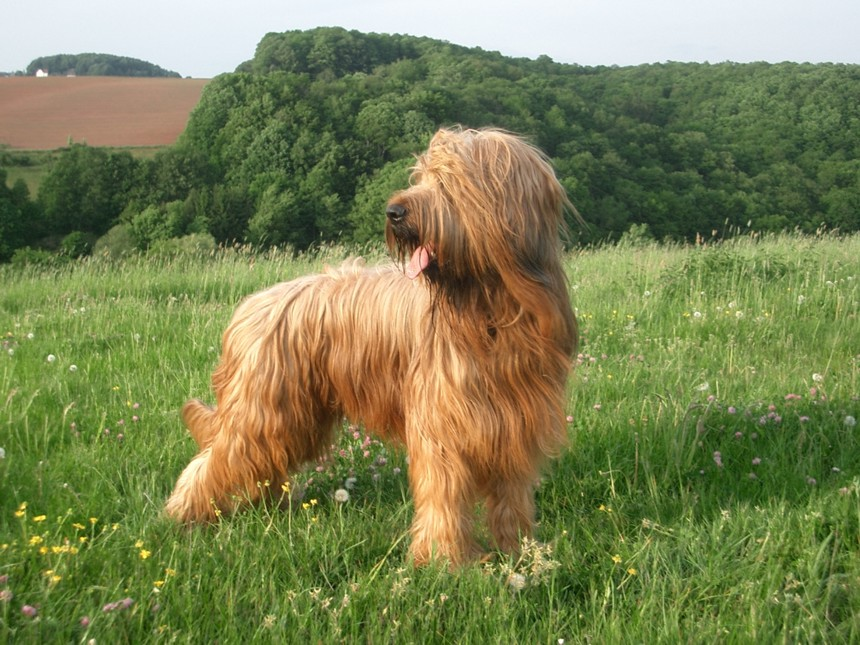
Fawn

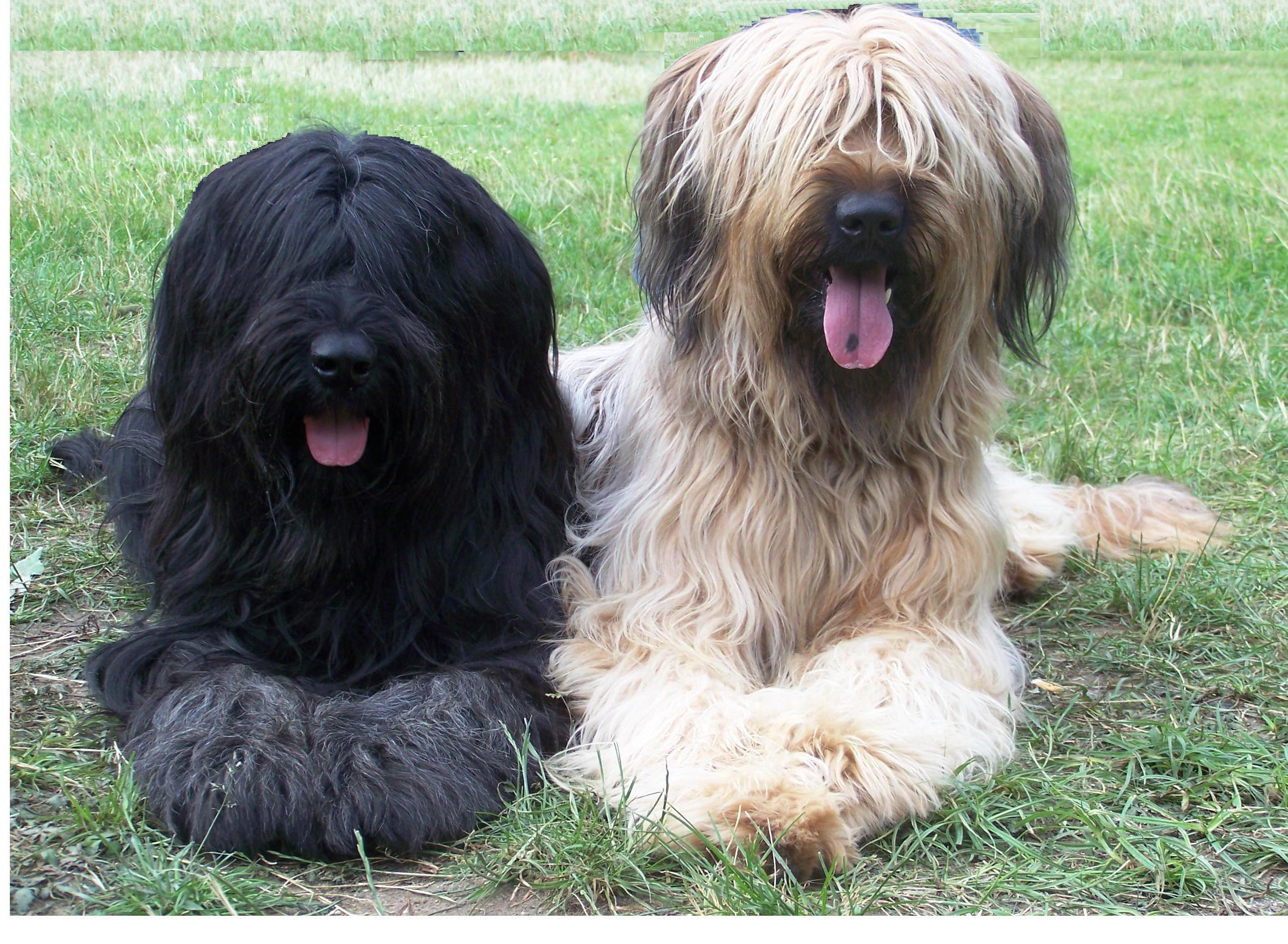
Black and fawn

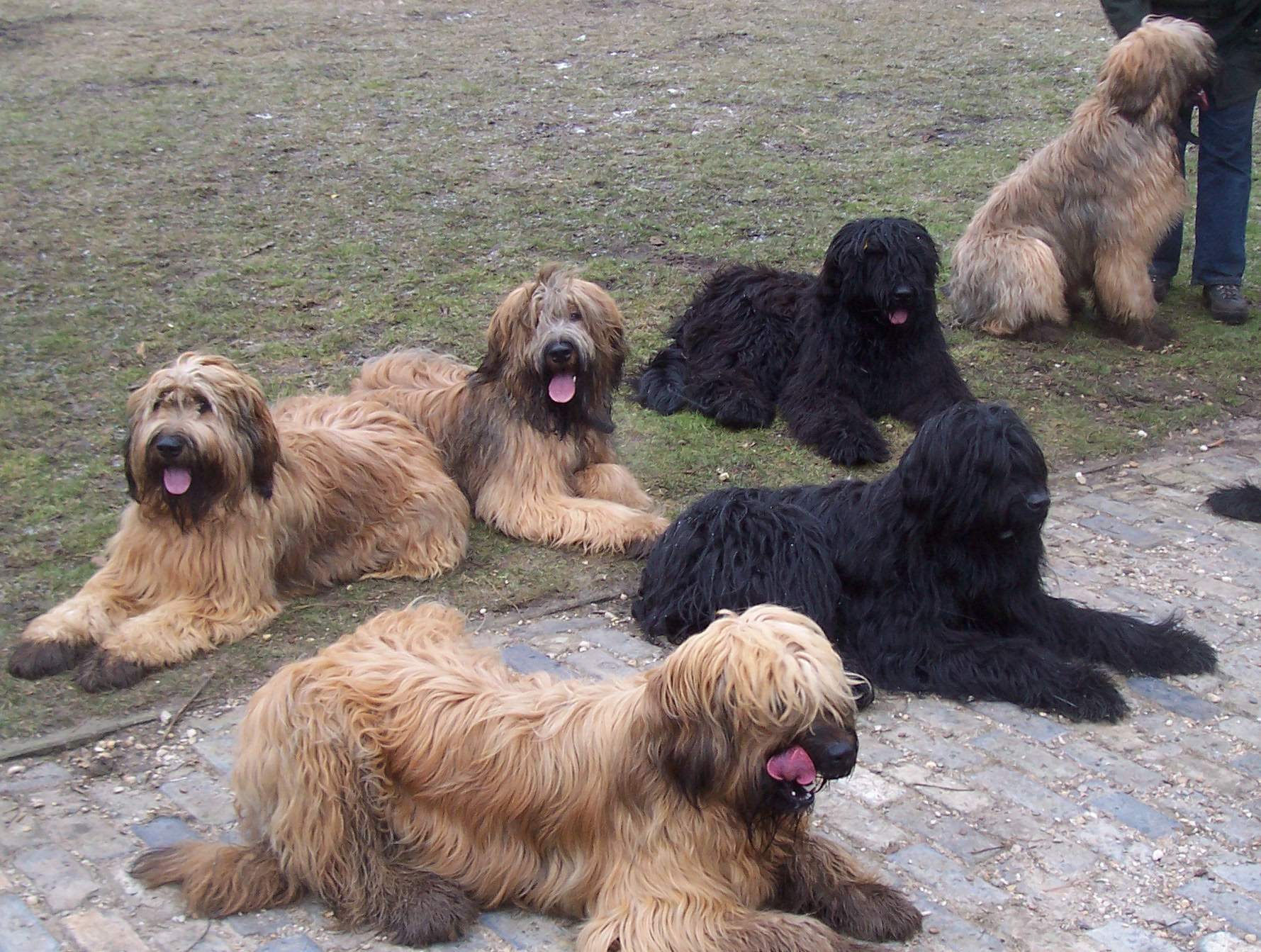
