= The Fang (frozen waterfall) =

Frozen waterfall near Vail, Colorado, United States

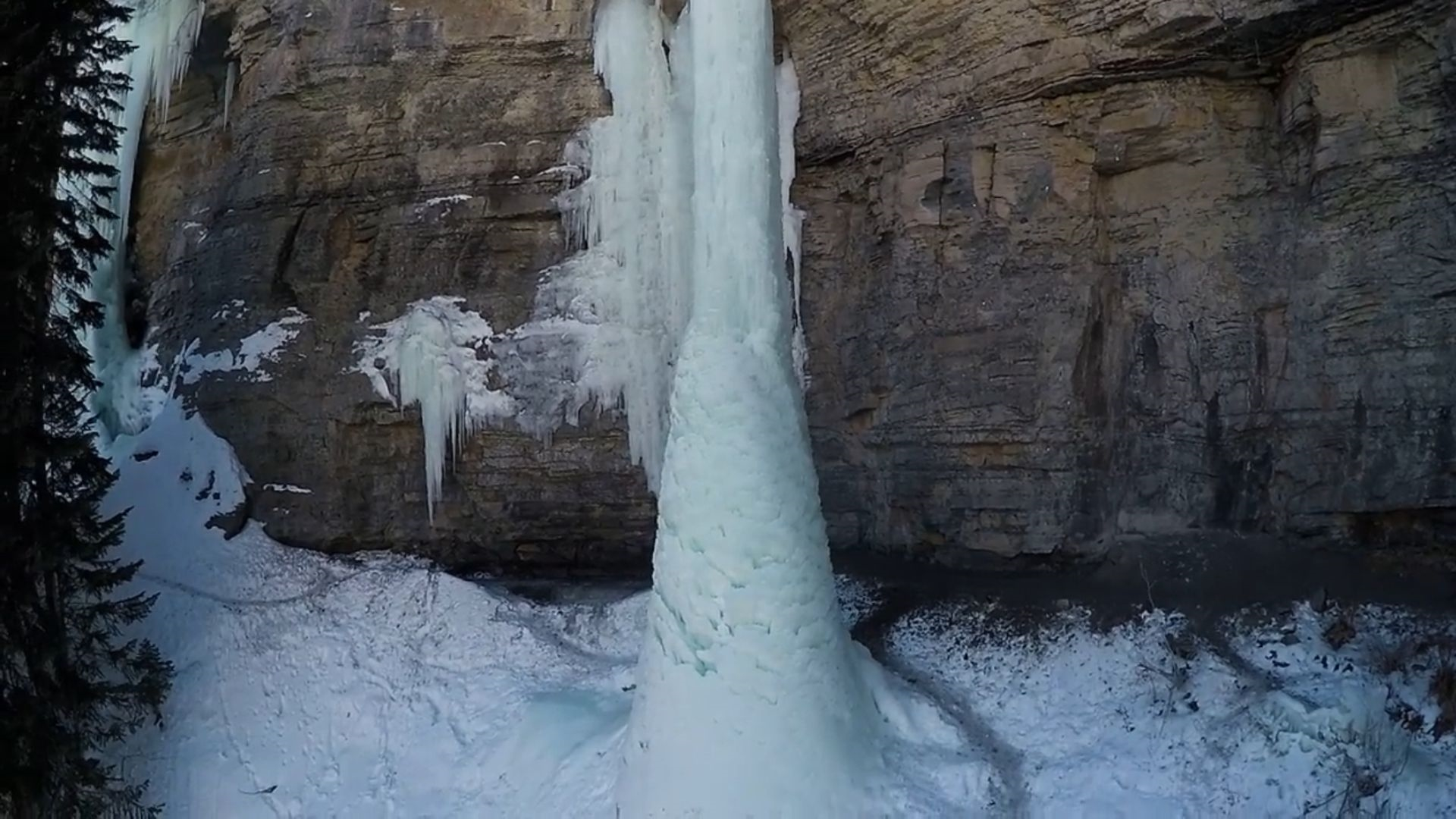
- The Fang (WI5), March 2015

- Location within Colorado
- Coordinates: 39°38′33.7″N 106°19′46.8″W
- Total height: 165 ft (50 m)
- Total width: 26 ft (7.9 m)

The Fang is a 165 foot tall waterfall in Eagle County near the town of Vail, Colorado. It lies in what is called the "Rigid Designator Amphitheatre", which is a significant location in North America for ice climbing and mixed climbing.

== Type ==
The Fang is a frozen waterfall and a plunge waterfall. Even when it is frozen, it will not change its shape. The reason why it is such a popular attraction for ice climbing is that very few waterfalls of this type freeze. Normal plunge waterfalls have fast plunge speeds, which makes it hard for it to freeze.

== Ice climbing ==
The Fang gets its popularity mainly during winter months when the waterfall freezes into a 26-foot wide, 165-foot tall thick ice pole. Ice climbers enjoy climbing the feature called The Fang and has an ice climbing grade of WI5, which is a level for expert ice climbers with advanced equipment.

== See also ==
- List of waterfalls
