= Mixed breed =

Lack of specific animal breed

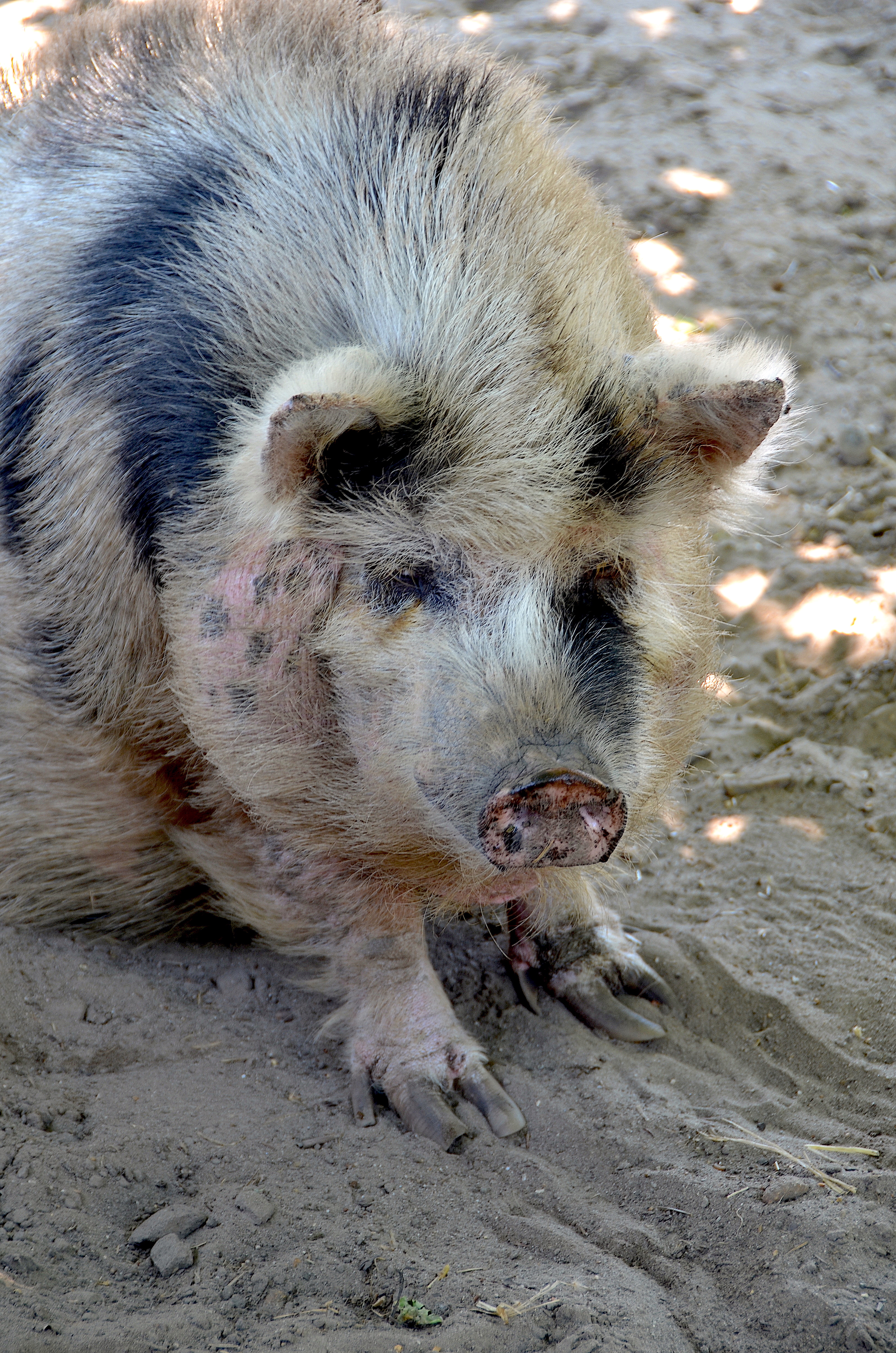
A mixed breed domestic pig without human intervention

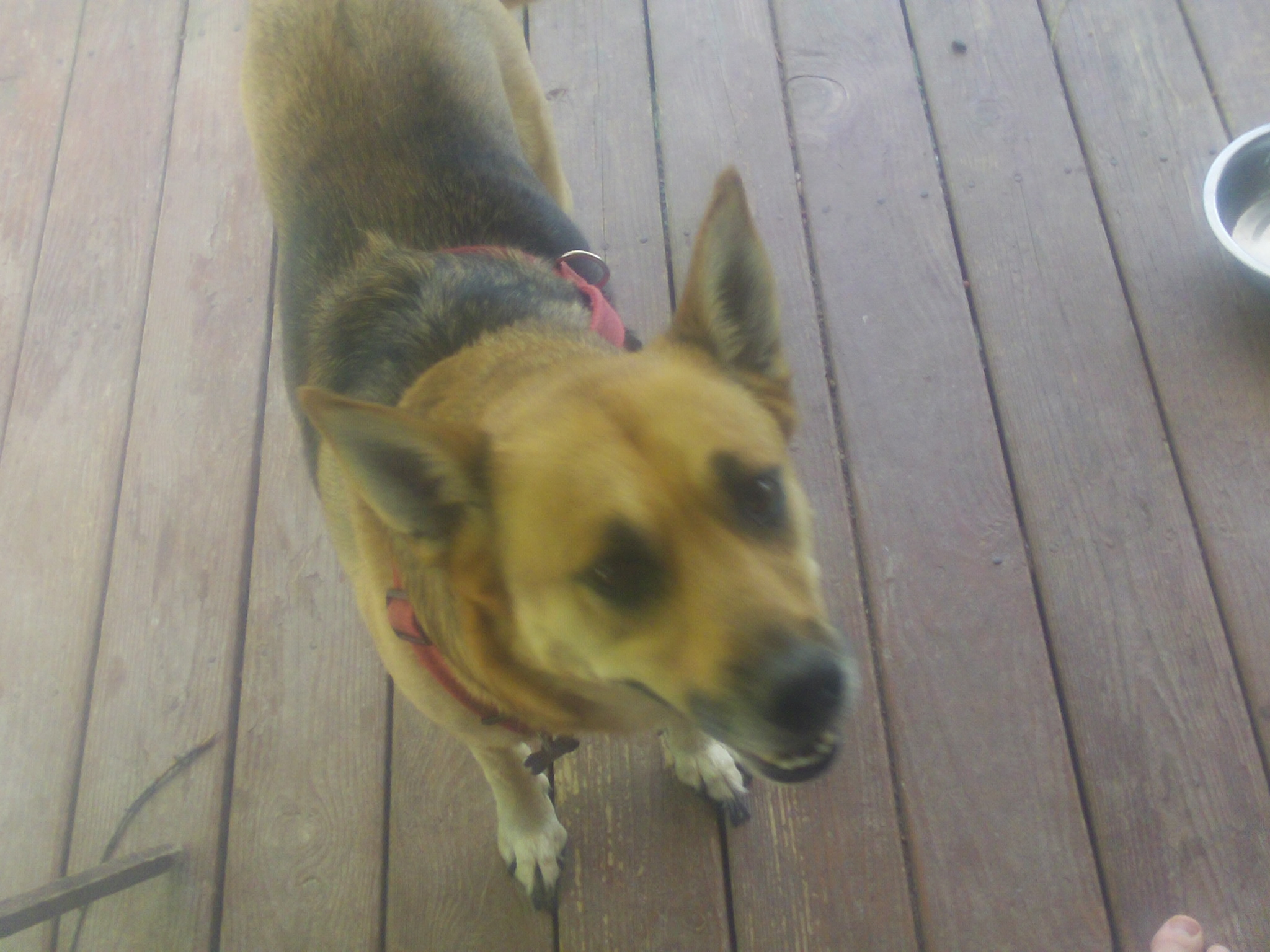
German Shepherd Mix - Possibly Mixed with Husky.

A mixed breed is a domesticated animal descended from multiple breeds of the same species, often breeding without any human intervention, recordkeeping, or selective breeding. Examples include:

- Mixed-breed dog, a dog whose ancestry is complex or not known, also colloquially known as mutt
- Grade horse, a horse whose parentage is unknown, unidentifiable, or of significantly mixed breeding
- A domestic short-haired cat or domestic long-haired cat of no particular breed, colloquially called a "moggy" or "moggie" in some dialects

== See also ==
- Crossbreed - where the animal's parentage is deliberately selected
- Hybrid - a mix between species
- Feral animal - may descend from multiple breeds
- Multiracial
