= Foes (RuneQuest) =

Role-playing game supplement

- Designers: David Forthoffer
- Publishers: Chaosium
- Publication: 1980; 46 years ago
- Genres: Fantasy
- Systems: Basic Role-Playing

Foes is a 1980 tabletop role-playing game supplement for RuneQuest written by David Forthoffer, and published by Chaosium. A 16 page version of Foes called Fangs was published by Chaosium in 1980, it was republished in 2016 in PDF format as part of Chaosium's RuneQuest: Classic Edition Kickstarter.

== Contents ==
Foes is a supplement of statistics for monsters and characters. Foes contains the statistical profiles of over 1200 computer generated creatures including: Aldryami, Dragonewts, beast men, trolls, flying creatures, lycanthropes, undead, humanoids, and nomads w/mounts.

== Reception ==
Steve Jackson reviewed Foes in The Space Gamer No. 28. Jackson commented that "you will probably want it. Just don't let it become a crutch. A book like this should supplement your imagination, not replace it."
