= Beauceron =

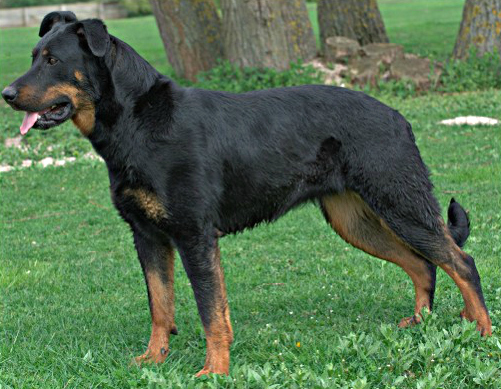
- Beauceron
- Other names: Berger de Beauce; Beauce Sheep Dog; Beauce Dog; Bas Rouge
- Origin: France
Traits
Height	Males	65–70 cm (26–28 in)
	Females	61–68 cm (24–27 in)
- Coat: Short, smooth and thick double coat
- Colour: Black and tan or occasionally a harlequin pattern
Kennel club standards
- Société Centrale Canine: standard
- Fédération Cynologique Internationale: standard

The Beauceron (French pronunciation: [bosʁɔ̃]) is a herding dog breed originating from the plains of Central France. The Beauceron is also known as Berger de Beauce (French pronunciation: [bɛʁʒe də bos], sheepdog from Beauce) or Bas Rouge (French pronunciation: [ba ʁuʒ], red-stockings).

== Description ==
=== Appearance ===
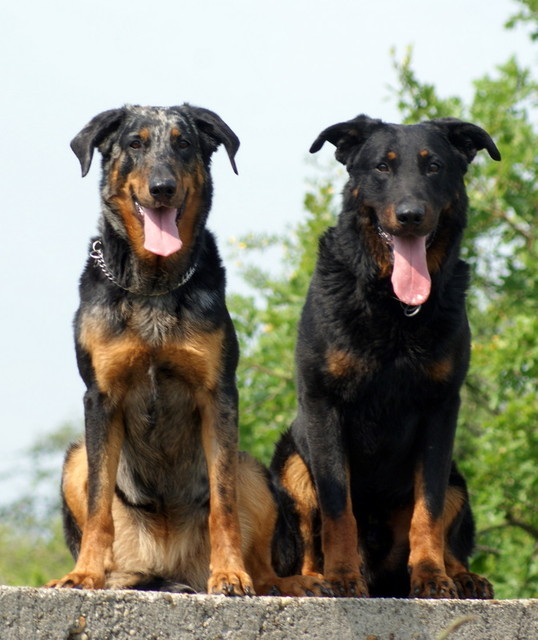
A harlequin (left) and a black and tan (right) Beauceron

This breed stands 61 to 70 cm (24 to 27.5 in) in height and weighs 30 to 45 kg (66 to 99 lb) The Beauceron has a hard outer coat and a woolly undercoat that grows thick in cold weather, especially if the dog sleeps outdoors. Its standard colouring is black and tan (the latter colour referred to in French as rouge ecureuil, squirrel-red) or, less frequently, grey, black and tan called harlequin. Other colours, such as the once prevalent tawny, grey or grey/black, are now banned by the breed standard. The harlequin coats should have more black than gray with no white. In the black and tan dogs the tan markings should appear in two dots above the eyes, on the sides of the muzzle, fading off to the cheeks, but do not reach the underside of the ears. Also on the throat, under the tail and on the legs and the chest. Tan markings on the chest should appear as two spots but a chest plate is acceptable. Ear cropping is no longer allowed in most countries.

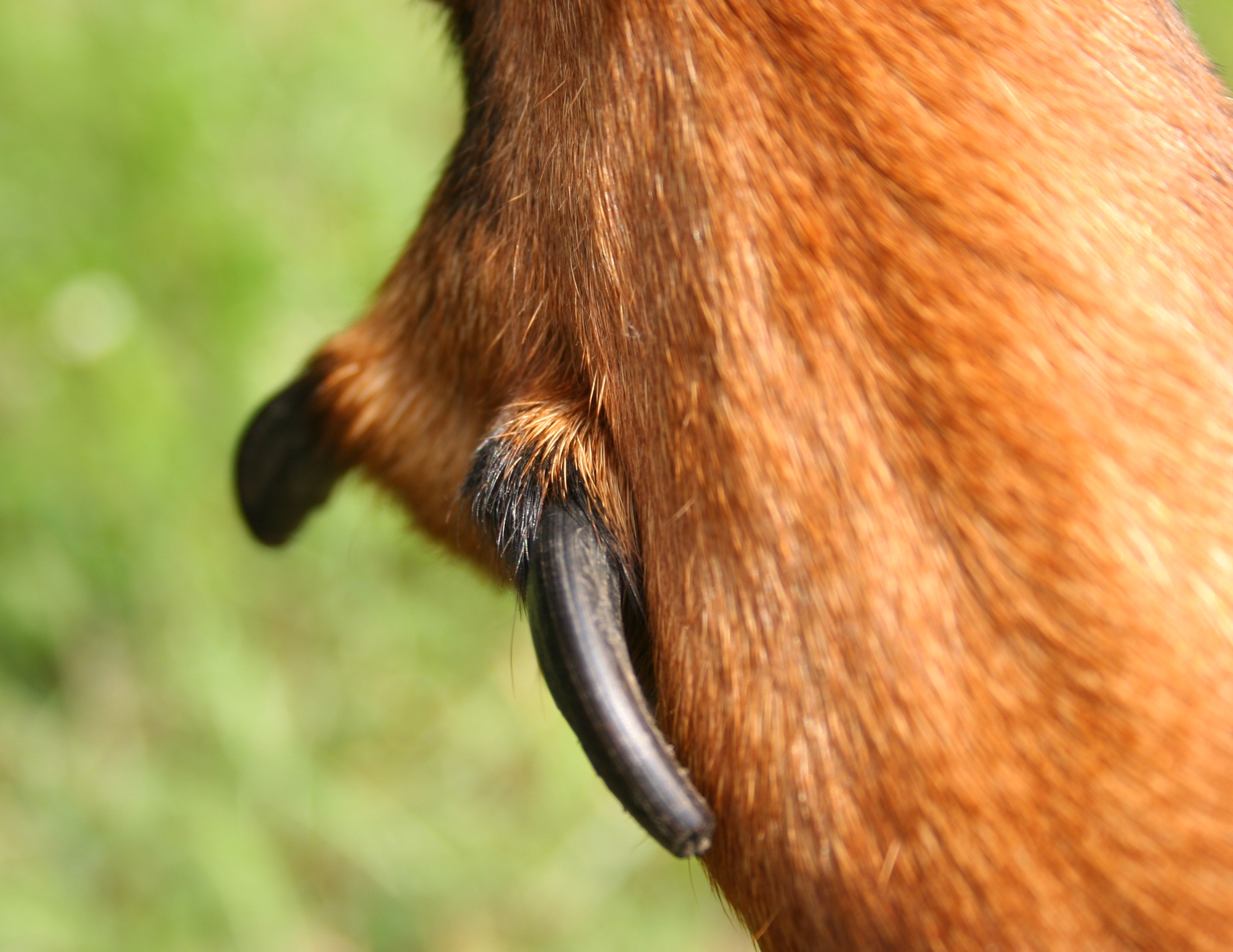
Double dewclaws are a characteristic of the Beauceron.

The Beauceron is unusual in having a double dewclaw. In order to be shown, a Beauceron must have double dewclaws that form well-separated "thumbs" with nails on each rear leg; anything less will result in disqualification from dog shows. The Beauceron's double dew claws are connected by bone (unlike most breeds) and some dogs are even able to flex each one individually. The Beauceron has no breed-specific health problems.

=== Characteristics ===
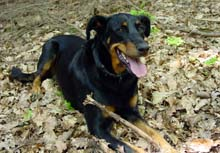
A Beauceron

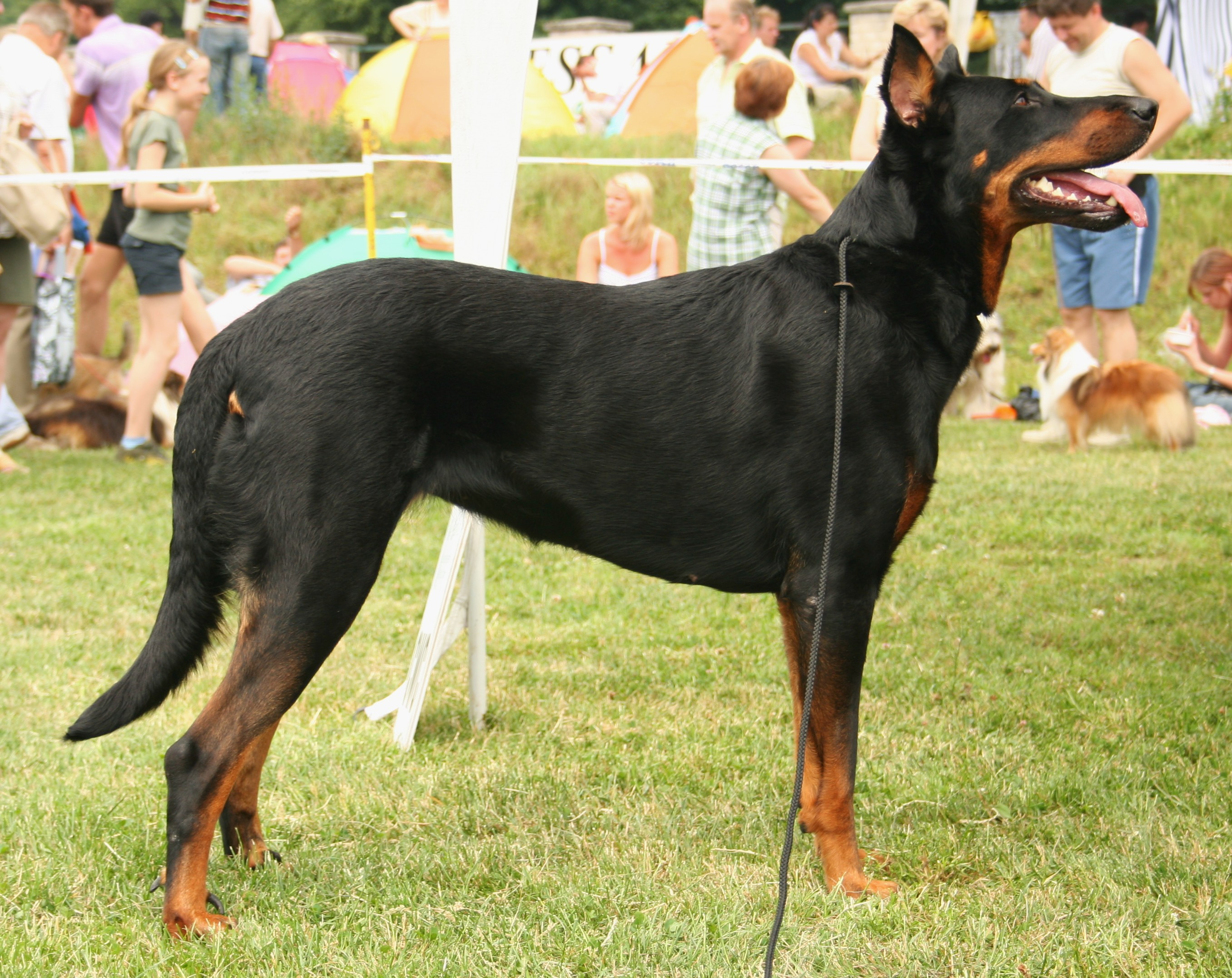
Beauceron with cropped ears

The Beauceron is known in France as a guard dog, a helper around the farm (herding sheep or cattle), and/or a ring sport dog (primarily protection training). This athletic, healthy and long-lived breed has been bred to be intelligent, calm, gentle, and fearless. Adults are typically suspicious of strangers and are excellent natural guard dogs. If not well trained, they can be aggressive. They do best when raised within the family but they can sleep outside, the better to act as guards (their weatherproof coats make them ideal kennel users even in the coldest winters). They have a double smooth coat that is short. They are eager learners and can be trained to a high level. However, their physical and mental development is slow relative to other similar breeds (e.g. German and other large shepherds): they are not mentally or physically mature until the age of about three years, so their training should not be rushed. Several five- or ten-minute play-training exercises per day in the early years can achieve better results than long or rigorous training sessions.

== History ==
The breed originated as a herding dog in France. It was first mentioned in 1587, and named as the "Berger de Beauce" in 1809. The first breed club was formed in 1911. During WWII, it was employed as a military dog. In modern France, it is used as a guard or police dog, and as of 1989 was still a popular sheep dog.

== See also ==
- List of dog breeds

== Bibliography ==
- Vous et votre beauceron (French), written by Pierre Boistel, published by Editions de l'Homme, January 8, 1991, ISBN 2-7619-0900-3, 166 pages
- Les Berger Francais (French), written by Philippe De Wailly and Alain Dupont, published by Solar, September 12, 1999, ISBN 2-263-02658-4
- Beauceron, written by Meg Purnell Carpenter, published by Kennel Club Books, May, 2007, ISBN 978-1-59378-371-6, 160 pages
- Le Beauceron (French), written by Monique Reverdy, published by Artémis, May 21, 2003, ISBN 2-84416-181-2, 144 pages
