= Dewclaw =

Digit on the foot of many mammals, birds, and reptiles

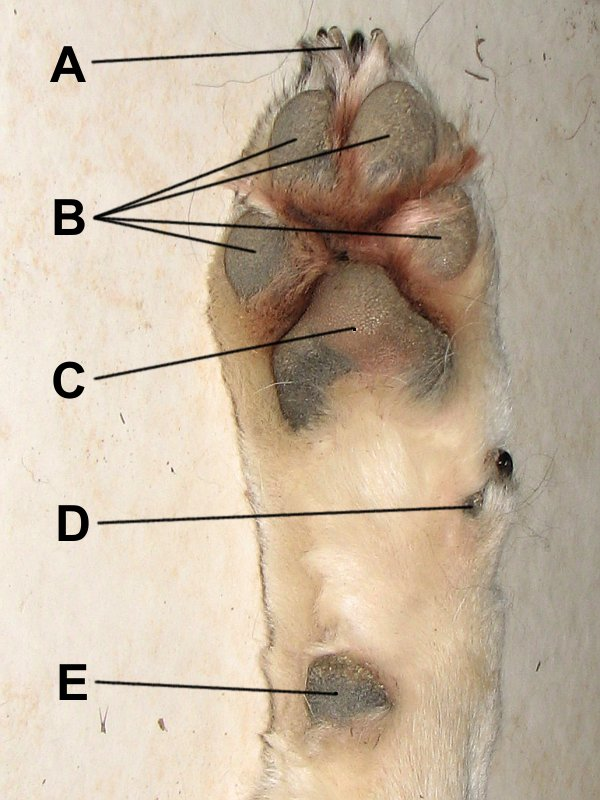
Paw of a dog: A. Claw, B. Digital pads, C. Metacarpal pad, D. Dewclaw, E. Carpal pad

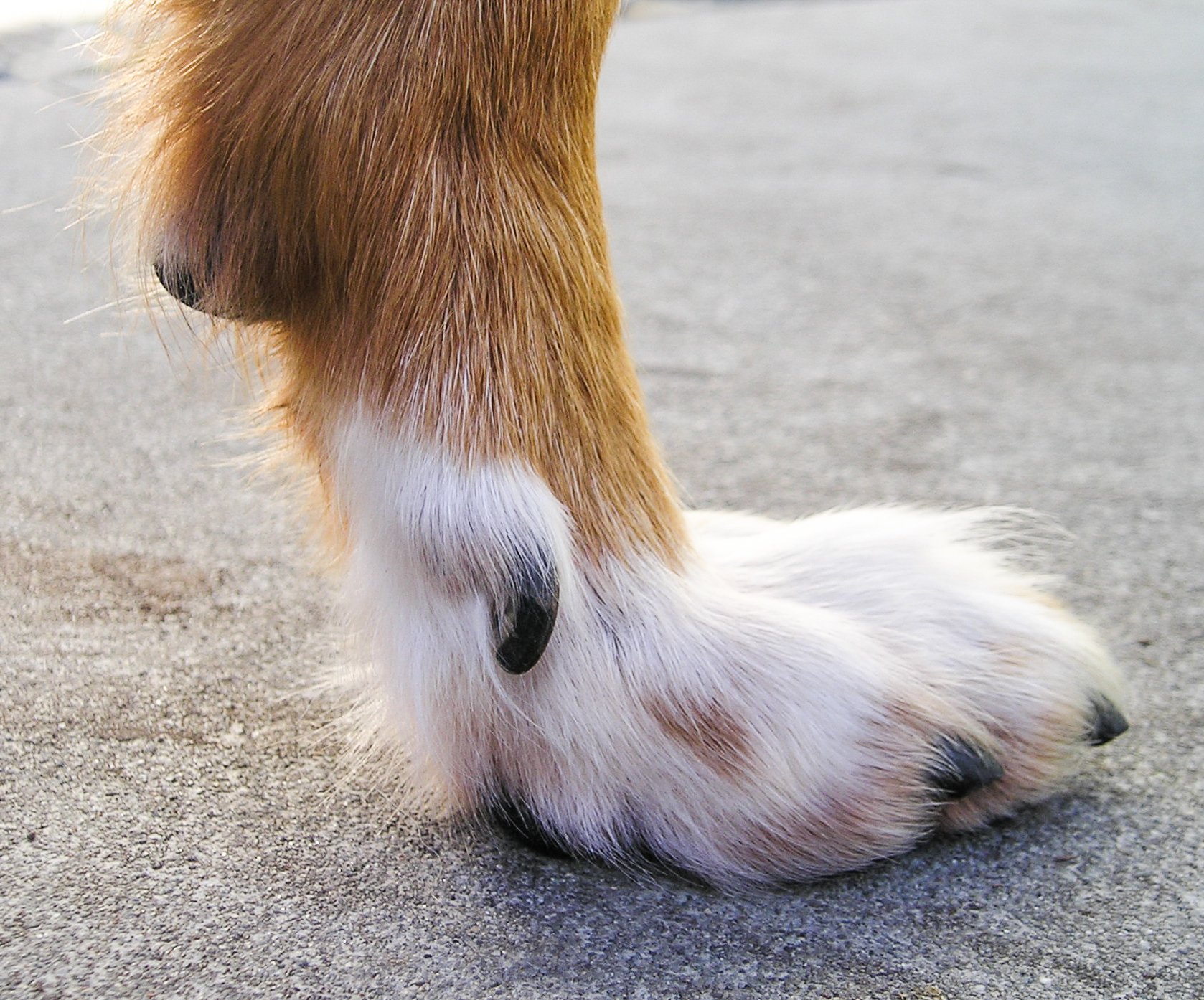
A dog's dewclaw does not make contact with the ground while the dog is standing. This older dog's dewclaw is rounded from use while running, but it has grown.

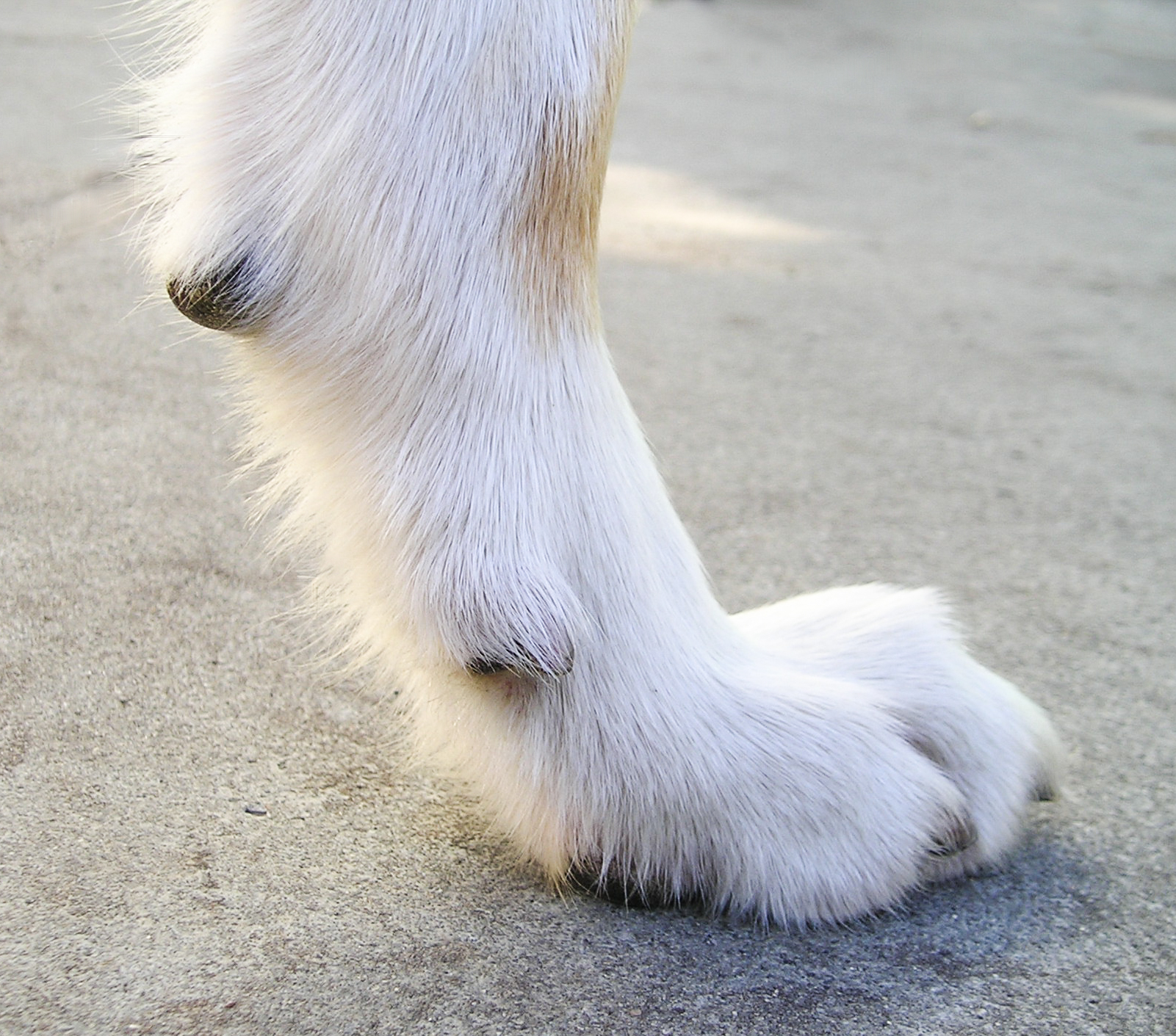
Some active dogs' dewclaws make more frequent contact with the ground while running, so they wear down naturally, as do their other claws.

Double dewclaws on rear leg of dog

A dewclaw is a digit – vestigial in some animals – on the foot of many mammals, birds, and reptiles (including some extinct orders, like certain theropods). It commonly grows higher on the leg than the rest of the foot, such that in digitigrade or unguligrade species, it does not make contact with the ground when the animal is standing. On dogs and cats, the dewclaws are on the inside of the front legs, similarly to a human's thumb, which shares evolutionary homology. Although many animals have dewclaws, other similar species do not, such as horses, giraffes and the African wild dog.

== Etymology ==
The dew- element in "dewclaw" (seen also in the word "dewlap") is of unclear origin. The word has been in use since the 1570s. It has been suggested that it refers to the dewclaw's alleged tendency to brush dew away from grass.

== Dogs ==
Dogs almost always have dewclaws on the inside of the front legs and occasionally also on the hind legs. Unlike front dewclaws, rear dewclaws tend to have little bone or muscle structure in most breeds. For certain dog breeds, a dewclaw is considered a necessity, e.g., a Beauceron for sheep herding and for navigating snowy terrain.

=== Rear dewclaws ===
Canids have four claws on the rear feet, although some domestic dog breeds or individuals have an additional claw, or more rarely two, as is the case with the Beauceron. A more technical term for these additional digits on the rear legs is hind-limb-specific preaxial polydactyly. Several genetic mechanisms can cause rear dewclaws; they involve the LMBR1 gene and related parts of the genome. Rear dewclaws often have no phalanx bones and are attached by skin only.

=== Dewclaws and locomotion ===
Based on stop-action photographs, veterinarian M. Christine Zink of Johns Hopkins University believes that the entire front foot, including the dewclaws, contacts the ground while running. During running, the dewclaw digs into the ground preventing twisting or torque on the rest of the leg. Several tendons connect the front dewclaw to muscles in the lower leg, further demonstrating the front dewclaws' functionality. There are indications that dogs without dewclaws have more foot injuries and are more prone to arthritis. Zink recommends "for working dogs it is best for the dewclaws not to be amputated. If the dewclaw does suffer a traumatic injury, the problem can be dealt with at that time, including amputation if needed."

== Cats ==
Members of the cat family – including domestic cats and wild cats like the lion – have dewclaws. Generally, a dewclaw grows on the inside of each front leg but not on either hind leg.

The dewclaw on cats is not vestigial. Wild felids use the dewclaw in hunting, where it provides an additional claw with which to catch and hold prey.

== Hoofed animals ==
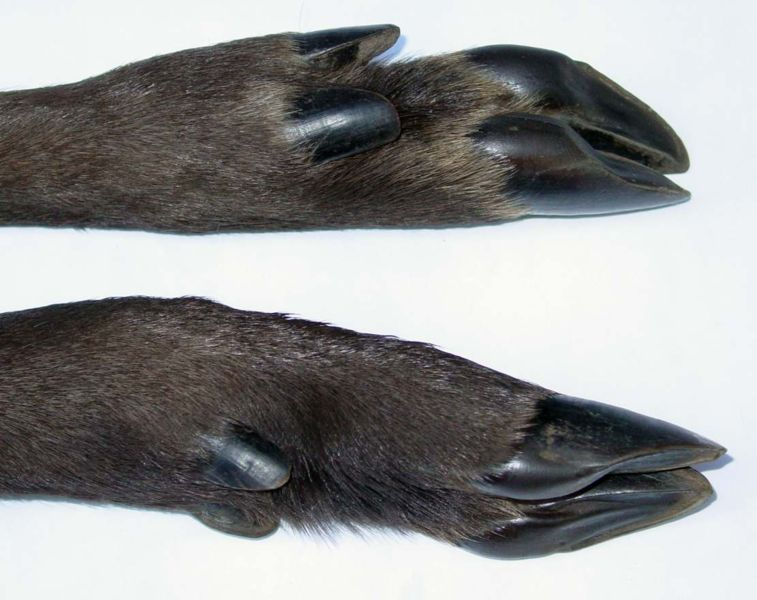
Cloven hooves of roe deer (Capreolus capreolus), with dewclaws

Hoofed animals walk on the tips of special toes, the hooves. Cloven-hoofed animals walk on a central pair of hooves, but many also have an outer pair of dewclaws on each foot. These are somewhat farther up the leg than the main hooves, and similar in structure to them. In some species (such as cattle) the dewclaws are much smaller than the hooves and never touch the ground. In others (such as pigs and many deer), they are only a little smaller than the hooves, and may reach the ground in soft conditions or when jumping. Some hoofed animals (such as giraffes and modern horses) have no dewclaws. Video evidence suggests some animals use dewclaws in grooming or scratching themselves or to have better grasp during mating.
