= Biewer Terrier =

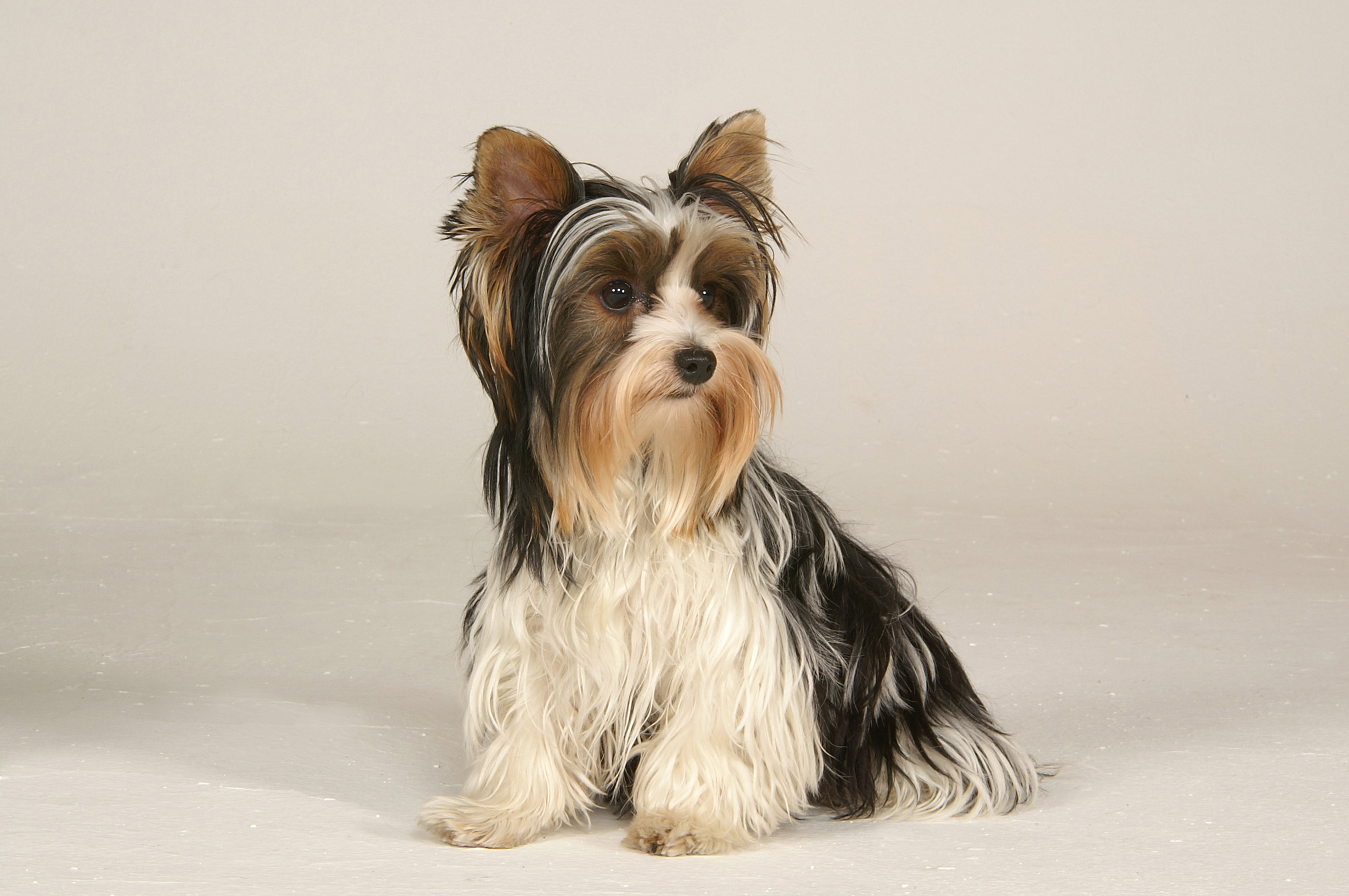
- Biewer Terrier
- Origin: Germany
Traits
- Height: 7–11 in (18–28 cm)
- Weight: 4–8 lb (1.8–3.6 kg)
- Coat: Long hair
- Color: Blue, black, gold, tan, and white
Kennel club standards
- AKC: standard

The Biewer Terrier (/ˌbiːvər ˈtɛriər/) is a toy dog of German descent that is the result of two Yorkshire Terriers with a recessive piebald gene breeding. It is usually kept as a companion animal or a show dog. The Biewer Terrier was recognized by the AKC in 2021. Since May 2024 the Biewer Terrier is also accepted by the (VDH) Verband für das Deutsche Hundewesen in Germany.

== History ==
The Biewer Terrier was first bred in Germany in 1984 by breeders Werner and Gertrude Biewer after two tricolor puppies were born in their kennel. A friend who was a veterinarian then suggested that the new breed be called "Biewer Yorkshire Terriers." A pair of puppies named "Schneeflockchen von Friedheck" and "Schneeman" were both sold to singer Margot Eskens, who suggested adding “a la Pom Pon” to the breed's full name resulting in the full name of "Biewer Yorkshire Terrier a la Pom Pon."

American fanciers began importing the breed from Germany to the United States in 2002. The Biewer Terrier grew in popularity and the Biewer Terrier Club of America (BTCA) was formed in 2006 to promote the breed. Members of the BTCA contacted Mars Veterinary to verify that the Biewer Terrier was a separate breed from the Yorkshire Terrier, After analyzing ten blood samples from the Biewer Terrier, it was concluded that the breed was separate from the Yorkshire Terrier. The breed was admitted into the AKC's Foundation Stock Service in 2014 and became the 197th breed recognized by the American Kennel Club in 2021.

== Characteristics ==
=== Appearance ===
The Biewer terrier is a small dog that closely resembles its parent breed, the Yorkshire terrier, with a fine, straight, silky coat. Unlike the Yorkshire, the tail is not traditionally docked and Biewer terriers come in two combinations of three colors, either white, blue, and black, or white, black, and gold/tan. The coloration is a result of the pre-existing recessive piebald gene. Biewers are generally between 4–8 lb (1.8–3.6 kg) and 7–11 in (18–28 cm)

=== Temperament ===
Biewer Terriers make affectionate and lively companions. These dogs are social, forming strong bonds with their owners and displaying a friendly demeanor towards strangers. Their playful and energetic disposition makes them suitable for a variety of activities, and they thrive on interaction and engagement with their human counterparts.

== Health ==
The Biewer Terrier can suffer from multiple health issues including tracheal collapse, bladder stones, patellar luxation, congenital portosystemic shunt, and hypoglycemia.

== Additional Reading ==
- Hoppendale, George (2018). Biewer Terrier. Biewer Terrier Complete Owners Manual. Biewer Terrier book for care, costs, feeding, grooming, health and training. Pesa Publishing. ISBN 9781910861868.
- Jones, Athena (2021). The Complete Guide for Biewer Terrier: The essential guide to being a perfect owner and having an obedient, healthy, and happy Biewer Terrier. Independently published. ISBN 979-8467673851.
