= Australian Terrier =

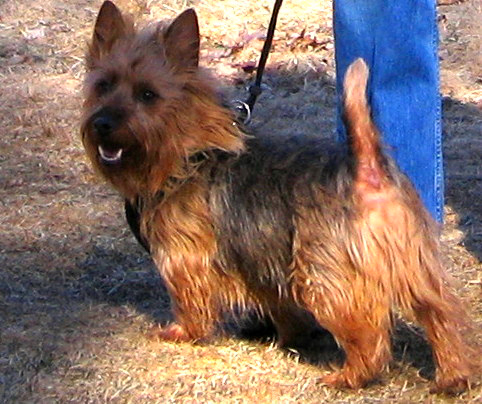
- An adult Australian Terrier
- Common nicknames: Aussie, Aussie Terrier
- Origin: Australia
Traits
Height	Males	~25 centimetres (10 in)
	Females	slightly less
Weight	Males	~6.5 kilograms (14 lb)
	Females	slightly less
Kennel club standards
- ANKC: standard
- Fédération Cynologique Internationale: standard

The Australian Terrier is a small breed of dog of the terrier type. The breed was developed in Australia, although the ancestral types of dogs from which the breed descends were from Great Britain.

== Appearance ==
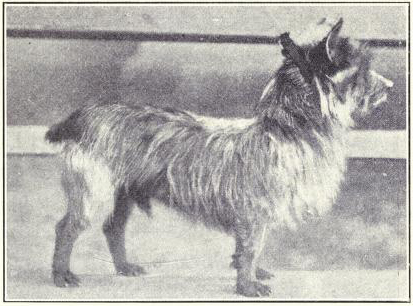
An Australian Terrier circa 1915

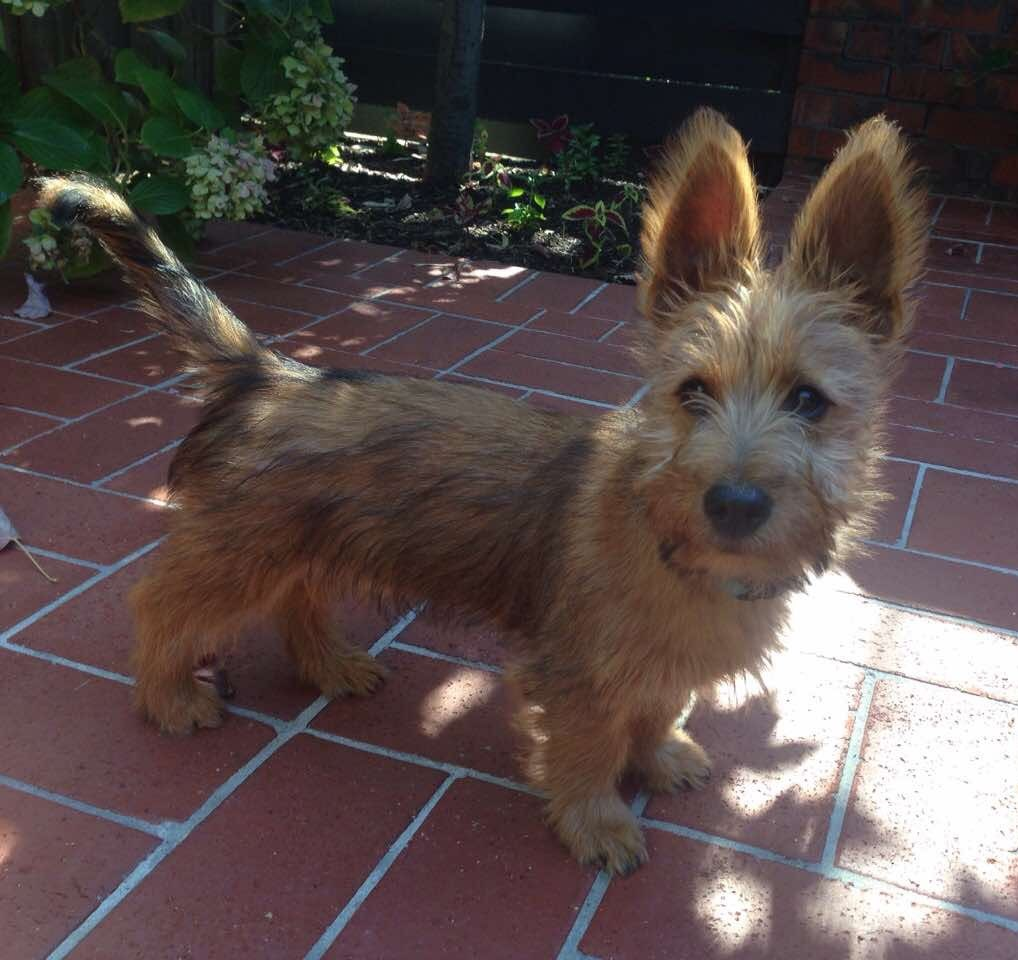
Australian Terrier - Puppy

The Australian Terrier is a small dog with short legs, weighing around 6.5 kilograms (14 lb) and standing about 25 centimetres (9.8 in) at the withers, with a medium length shaggy harsh double coat that is not normally trimmed. Fur is shorter on the muzzle, lower legs, and feet, and there is a ruff around the neck. The coat colours are blue or silver and tan with a lighter coloured topknot, and with markings on face, ears, body and legs of a colour described in the breed standard as "tan, never sandy", or a solid red with a sandy variation. The tail was traditionally docked, in order to protect the dog from spinal injury while working and hunting in the field.

== History ==
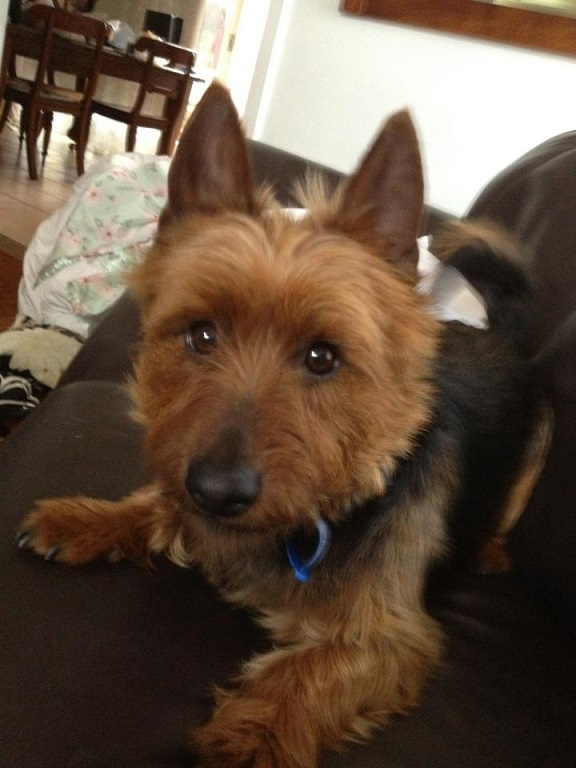
Young male Australian Terrier

The Australian Terrier is descended from the rough coated type terriers brought from Great Britain to Australia in the early 19th century. The ancestral types of all of these breeds were kept to eradicate mice and rats. The Australian Terrier shares ancestors with the Cairn Terrier, Shorthaired Skye Terrier, and the Dandie Dinmont Terrier; Yorkshire Terriers and Irish Terriers were also crossed into the dog during the breed's development.

Development of the breed began in Australia about 1820, and the dogs were at first called the Rough Coated Terrier. The breed was officially recognised in 1850, and later renamed as the Australian Terrier in 1892. The Australian Terrier was shown at a dog show for the first time in 1906 in Melbourne, and was also shown in Great Britain about the same time.

== Health ==
The Australian Terrier is known to be susceptible to the auto-immune disease Vogt-Koyanagi-Harada-like syndrome.

A 2002 survey by the Australian Terrier Club of America found that the top three causes of death were old age (17%), cancer (15%), and diabetes (13%). The most common conditions affecting dogs were diabetes mellitus (10%), luxating patella (9%), ear infections (5%), cataracts (5%), flea allergy dermatitis (5%), ruptured cranial cruciate ligament (4%), and hypothyroidism (4%).

=== Life expectancy ===
Life expectancy in the 2002 American survey was 11 years. Bitches lived roughly a year longer than dogs. A survey in the UK of breed club members found the Australian Terrier to have a median life expectancy of just above 12 years.

== Temperament ==
The breed standard describes the ideal Australian Terrier temperament as spirited, alert, "with the natural aggressiveness of a ratter and hedge hunter". The Australian Terrier ranks 34th in Stanley Coren's The Intelligence of Dogs, being of above average "Working and Obedience" intelligence, indicating good trainability.

== See also ==
- List of dog breeds
- Terrier
- Australian Silky Terrier
- Terrier Group
