= Paisley Terrier =

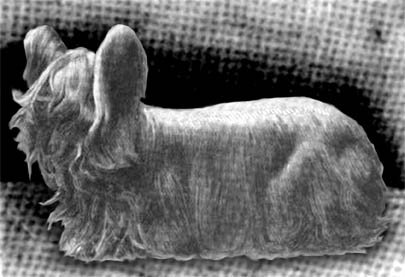
- A Paisley Terrier in 1903
- Other names: Clydesdale Terrier
- Common nicknames: Silky
- Origin: Scotland
- Breed status: Extinct

The Paisley or Clydesdale Terrier was a breed of terrier-type dog that is now extinct. Originating in Scotland, the Paisley Terrier was bred primarily as a pet and showdog version of the Skye Terrier, and was the progenitor of today's Yorkshire Terrier. The breed was called the Paisley Terrier since most of the dogs came from that location, but it was also called the Clydesdale Terrier, for another location in the Clyde Valley where the dogs were bred.

== Appearance ==
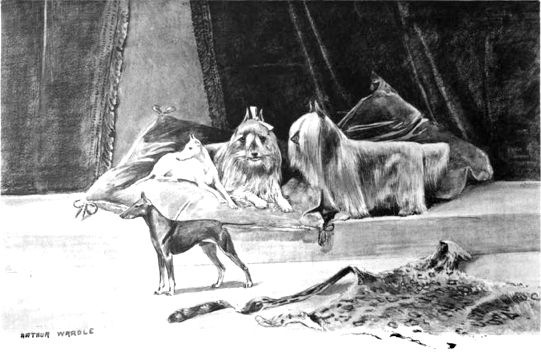
Paisley Terriers in 1894 with another popular toy dog of the era, the English Toy Terrier (Black & Tan)

The appearance of the Paisley Terrier was similar to the Skye Terrier, but it was shorter backed and weighed around 7 kg (16 lbs), about half the weight of today's Skye Terrier. The breed had a flowing "silvery, soft jacket" (coat) of blue and tan, and was shown along with the hard-coated Skye Terriers. They were further described as having a great profusion of silky fur with very profuse ear feathering (long hair on the ears). To differentiate it from the Skye, it was nicknamed the Silky. From the earliest time of the breed, the beauty of the coat won prizes at dog shows. Traditionally, the dogs were shown standing on a box, so that the length of the silky coat could be shown to its best advantage.

The Paisley Terrier was described in 1894 as "an excellent house dog, and most suitable for a lady who wishes something more substantial than a toy", but the care requirements for the coat made it less desirable than some other popular breeds as a pet.

== History ==
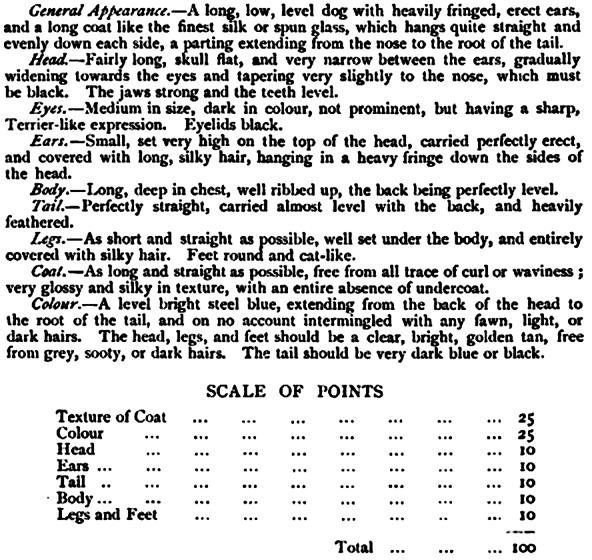
An early breed standard

In a book written in 1894, the author speculates that the Paisley Terrier was created by fanciers in Glasgow who selected Skye Terriers with short backs and long, silky coats "until they bred fairly truly".

Describing the Paisley Terrier in 1894, Rawdon Lee writes that "Though he can kill rats, and maybe other vermin, the Paisley Terrier is essentially a pet dog, and is usually kept as such." The breed was primarily a pet, and it was also a popular show dog. In 1903, the breed is referred to as "a fancier's dog, a sport from the Skye Terrier stock" and despite some fanciers of the time claiming that the breed had the "hardiness and fitness for terrier work... it is evident that a dog with a coat that looks like silk is simply a toy." Owners and breeders in the 1800s placed a high value on the beautiful blue and tan coat, and would cover the dog's feet and tie the hair back over their eyes to keep the coat looking at its best for dog shows.

The Kennel Club recognised the Paisley Terrier in 1888 as a variety of the Skye Terrier, even though separate show classes had been held for the two types in 1887. However, there were so few entries that the Kennel Club did not continue to encourage offering the category at further exhibitions.

The breed's success as a show dog may have led to its decline. Judges would give awards to the dogs with the long, attractive coat, since length of coat was a principal factor in Skye Terriers. The Paisleys, bred for long but soft coats (useless for a working dog), would win the prizes. Skye Terrier fanciers objected to the type being shown with Skyes, since they considered the Paisleys to be mixed breeds or possibly crossed with Dandie Dinmont Terriers. The interest of fanciers declined, and the breed began to disappear.

A book published in 1918 describes Paisley Terriers as uncommon and "I doubt that you'll ever see one in the United States." But with the availability of Internet-based dog registries that will register breeds with little or no documentation, combined with the public's appetite for unique or rare pets, it is likely that there will be attempts to reconstitute the breed.

== Continuing influence ==
The famous 1860s showdog Huddersfield Ben came from Paisley Terrier stock in the 1860s, and is considered by all authorities to be the founding sire of the Yorkshire Terrier breed, although the Yorkshire Terrier was not recognized until 1890. It is also the ancestor of many other breeds, notably the Silky Terrier and the Biewer Terrier.

== See also ==
- Huddersfield Ben
- List of dog breeds
- Yorkshire Terrier
- Dog terminology
