= Sacculectomy =

Sacculectomy may refer to the removal of:

- Laryngeal saccules
- Anal glands
