= Huddersfield Ben =

Yorkshire terrier dog (c. 1865–1871)

- Ch. Huddersfield Ben, foundation sire of the Yorkshire Terrier.
- Species: Canis familiaris
- Breed: Yorkshire Terrier
- Sex: Male
- Born: 1865; Huddersfield, England
- Died: 23 September 1871
- Nationality: United Kingdom
- Occupation: Show dog
- Known for: Foundation sire of the Yorkshire Terrier breed
- Owners: Mr. and Mrs. M.A. Foster
- Named after: Maternal grandfather

Huddersfield Ben (c. 1865 – 23 September 1871), an early Yorkshire Terrier, is universally acknowledged to be the foundation sire of the breed. In his day Ben won many prizes, both as a show dog and in ratting contests. He had tremendous influence in setting the breed type for the Yorkshire Terrier, a new breed still under development in Ben's day. Although larger than a standard Yorkshire Terrier, Ben regularly sired stock under 7 pounds.

== Pedigree ==
Pedigree for Huddersfield Ben, which shows that Ben was linebred

Mr. and Mrs. M.A. Foster of Bradford, in West Yorkshire England, owned Huddersfield Ben. The dog was bred by Mr. W. Eastwood in the town of Huddersfield, England. According to Ben's pedigree, he was linebred (the product of a mother-son pairing), as was his mother Lady. Lady was the great-great-granddaughter of Mr. J. Swift's Old Crab, a long-coated black-and-tan terrier born around 1850. Old Crab and Old Kitty, a Paisley Terrier owned by J. Kershaw of Halifax, West Yorkshire England, are the earliest recorded predecessors to the Yorkshire Terrier.

== Show career ==
Huddersfield Ben, registration number 3612, had an accomplished career in dog shows. He competed in Manchester in 1869 and placed second. He was shown again at Manchester in 1870 and won first place. At the Crystal Palace dog shows in 1870 and 1871, Ben took first and second prizes, respectively. Throughout his show career, Ben won 74 prizes.

== Foundation sire ==
In spite of his short lifespan, Huddersfield Ben was responsible for producing most of the foundation stock of the Yorkshire Terrier. He was an extremely popular stud dog, being prepotent, and especially due to his reputation as one of the first to breed true to type Yorkshire Terriers. Although between 9 and 12 lb, he regularly sired stock that competed in the under 7 lb limit.

== Death and taxidermy ==
At the age of 6, Ben was run over by a carriage and killed. His body was taxidermized and put on display, but has gone missing since the Second World War.

== See also ==
- List of individual dogs
