= Laryngeal saccules =

Extensions of the laryngeal ventricles

Laryngeal saccule
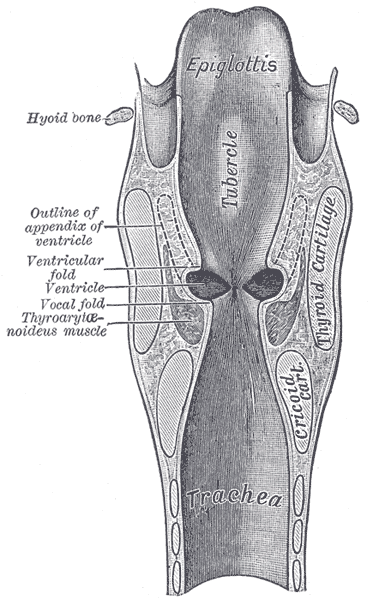
- A coronal section of the human larynx, showing the laryngeal saccules, labelled appendix of ventricle.

Details
- System: larynx

Identifiers
- Latin: sacculus laryngis
- TA98: A06.2.09.011
- TA2: 3207
- FMA: 64172

The laryngeal saccules are soft tissue masses that are extensions of the laryngeal ventricles in the larynx. Their function is not well understood, but they may lubricate the vocal cords, and increase the resonance of vocalisation. They may be involved in airway disease and airway obstruction. They may be surgically removed using a laryngeal sacculectomy.

== Structure ==
The laryngeal saccules are extensions of the laryngeal ventricles as part of the lateral wall of the larynx. They ascend posterior to the thyroid cartilage. They are surrounded by loose areolar connective tissue. This may contain lymphoid tissue, which is healthy in children and may be a sign of illness in adults.

The laryngeal saccules have pseudostratified columnar epithelium, and contain many mucous glands.

== Function ==
The function of the laryngeal saccules is not well understood. They may help to lubricate the vocal cords, with the contraction of surrounding muscles increasing mucus secretion. In other animals (such as primates), they may increase the resonance of vocalisation.

== Clinical significance ==
The laryngeal saccules may become infected, or become a laryngocoele. They may be assessed during laryngoscopy.

=== Airway disease ===
Chronic airway obstruction (caused by stenotic nares, elongated soft palate, or other conditions) can evert the laryngeal saccules. This may aggravate an existing breathing problem. Prolonged airway stress can pull laryngeal walls inward, further obstructing the airway and causing swelling and irritation of the laryngeal membranes. Tracheal collapse may also contribute to a cycle of airway obstruction and airway changes.

In brachycephalic breeds of dog, the saccules can become everted and protrude into the laryngeal opening, causing symptoms such as snoring, noisy breathing, coughing, nasal congestion, and shortness of breath in affected dogs.

=== Surgical removal ===
Laryngeal sacculectomy may involve snipping the saccules out with scissors or snaring them with a wire loop, or the saccules may be removed with the use of a laser. This allows a dog with airway disease to breathe better or normally.

== History ==
The laryngeal saccules may also be known as appendices of the laryngeal ventricles.
