= Laryngocele =

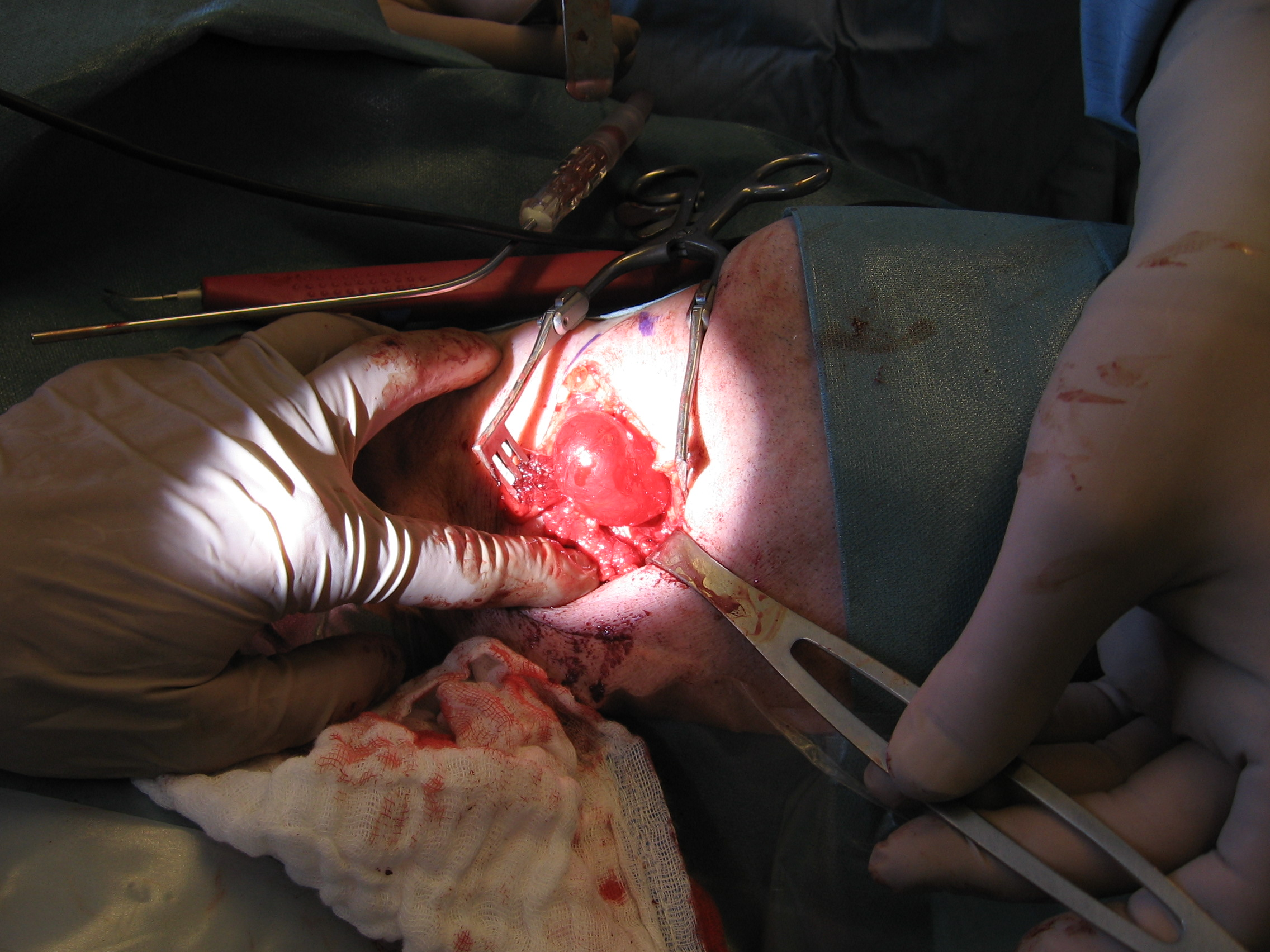
- Representation of a surgical site; laryngocele
- Specialty: ENT surgery

A laryngocele is a congenital anomalous air sac communicating with the cavity of the larynx, which may bulge outward on the neck.

It may also be acquired, as seen in glassblowers and trumpet player Dizzy Gillespie, due to continual forced expiration producing increased pressures in the larynx which leads to dilatation of the laryngeal ventricle (sinus of Morgagni). It is also seen in people with chronic obstructive airway disease.

== Additional images ==
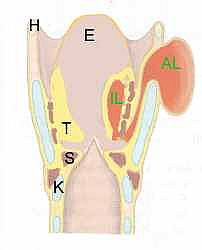
Laryngocele * IL = internal laryngocel AL = external laryngocele H = Hyoid bone T = Vestibular folds S = Vocal folds K = Cricoid cartilage
