= Elongated soft palate =

Disorder of cats and dogs

An elongated soft palate is a congenital hereditary disorder that negatively affect dogs and cats' breathing and eating. A soft palate is considered elongated when it extends past the top of the epiglottis and/or past the middle of the tonsillar crypts. The soft palate is made up of muscle and connective tissue located in the posterior portion on the roof of the mouth. The soft palate creates a barrier between the mouth (oral cavity) and nose (nasal cavity). This continuation between the cavities makes it possible to chew and breathe at the same time. The soft palate only blocks the nasal cavity while swallowing. At rest the soft palate should only stretch caudally from the hard palate to the tip of the epiglottis leaving an opening between the nasal and oral cavities. When the soft palate is elongated, it partially blocks the throat thereby creating breathing and feeding-related issues. The elongation and other accompanying symptoms occur in breeds characterized with "smooshed faces" such as pugs, bulldogs, and Persian cats. This condition is a congenital, meaning it is present when the animal is born. The "smooshed" characteristics is the result of a genetic mutation. The animal's genetic code causes the bones in their skull to grow to a smaller size. Because the bones are smaller, muscles and other tissues that surround the bones of the skull are out of proportion. These animals are often referred to as brachycephalic, derived from the Greek words for "short" and "head". An elongated soft palate is a symptom of Brachycephalic Obstructive Airway Syndrome (BOAS) and is common in brachycephalic dog breeds and has been reported in brachycephalic cat breeds as well. Some of the other BOAS related symptoms include stenotic nares, everted laryngeal saccules, and laryngeal collapse.

== Signs and symptoms ==
Some of the signs and symptoms of an elongated soft palate are loud and/or labored breathing and eating difficulties. Some of the breathing symptoms include stridor, snoring, wheezing, gasping, and reverse sneezing. Some of the eating symptoms include gaging and trouble swallowing. Severely affected pets may develop apnea, syncope, cyanosis.

In extreme cases, the animal may be exercise intolerant and may collapse, when overly exerted.

Many brachycephalic pet owners may see these symptoms as "normal" for that breed.

Recognizing different sounds during the animals breathing can help to diagnose BOAC and the presence of an elongated soft palate.

- Pharyngeal Noise: This noise is termed 'stertor' and occurs when a dog cannot 'pant' normally due to blockage. So, the dog breathes partially through the nose, creating negative pressure which triggers a low-pitched, snoring sound, or "awake snores".
- Laryngeal Noise: this noise is termed 'stridor' and typically affects pugs. It is characterized as a noise similar to wheezing and is higher pitched. This sound occurs when there is a narrow or collapsed larynx. A collapsed larynx can occur from leaving an elongated soft palate untreated.
- Nasopharyngeal Noise: noise created due to stenotic nares; a nasal obstruction caused by altered growth of the scrolls within the nose. It includes a combination of low- and high-pitched noises similar to grunting.
- Reverse Sneezing: related to when the elongated soft palate irritates the back of the throat. It is a low grunting sound, similar to clearing your throat. Episodes usually last for a few seconds or up to a few minutes.

== Diagnosis ==
Pets can be diagnosed via physical examination, which involves observation and detection of the symptoms associated with altered breathing due to an elongated soft palate and BOAC. Another diagnostic option is an oral examination. Oral examinations are performed under sedation and includes determining the position of the soft palate. It also involves assessing other symptoms that often accompany an elongated soft palate such as, checking for masses or redundant pharyngeal tissue, evaluating the laryngeal structures and checking for tonsil inflammation. CT scans can also be performed.

== Treatment ==
There are medical and surgical options once a diagnosis is made. Weight loss, controlling allergies, staying in a cool environment, and avoiding neck leads. For gastrointestinal issues, a combination of antacids and prokinetic drugs can be used. The specific medication is depended on the severity of the gastrointestinal issues present upon examination. Packer RM and Tivers M found that after about a 6 month follow up, 72.1% of owners stated that their dog's digestive status was excellent and 75% no longer needed treatment or a special diet .

An elongated soft palate can be treated surgically by resection, meaning the excess soft palate tissue is removed. A surgical risk could be removing too much of the soft palate. If the soft palate, then becomes too short, it will no longer be able to block off the nasal and oral cavities during swallowing. Surgical options include:

- Soft palate resection: a surgical option for shortening the elongated soft palate. The surgery can be performed with a scalpel, electrocautery, or a CO_{2} laser. Using a scalpel involves cutting away the excess soft palate and suturing where it was cut from. Choosing the electrocautery option poses some risks. Electrocautery can cause severe tissue edema (excess fluid in your tissues) and a large band of necrosis (cell and tissue death). CO_{2} laser surgery causes little to no bleeding and it is a quicker procedure when compared to other treatment methods. Sutures are often not required. Electrocautery and diode laser surgery results in little to no bleeding, but due to excessive heat and their burning nature, these methods may cause tissue edema. Sutures are often not required. Scalpel or scissors surgery takes longer than with the CO_{2} laser, there is bleeding, and suturing is required.
- Rhinoplasty: surgical enlargement of the stenotic nares in order to improve airflow. This procedure often accompanies soft palate surgery. This reduces the chances of secondary airway changes happening. It has also shown that the two surgeries paired together it has a better outcome than just the soft palate surgery alone. Packer RM and Tivers M found that the results of this surgery showed that about 25% of dogs were "breathing normally" after the procedure and about 53.6% saw much improvement.
- Laryngeal saccule resection: when there is a grade I laryngeal collapse, the laryngeal saccules are everted. This causes another obstruction that blocks the airway. Treatment for this involves cutting out the everted saccules. This also usually occurs in pair with the soft palate resection and rhinoplasty. Packer RM and Tivers M found that out of a group of dogs who received this procedure, 78% showed some sort of improvement in their breathing.

Early intervention and correction is recommended. The majority of patients show improvement after elongated soft palate surgery.
