= Hypoplasia of dens =

Hypoplasia of dens is a congenital non-formation of the pivot point of the second cervical vertebra, which leads to spinal cord damage. Onset of the condition may occur at any age, producing signs ranging from neck pain to quadriplegia. Hypoplasia of dens affects dogs. It is more commonly seen in certain breeds, including the Chihuahua, the Papillon, the Pointer and the Yorkshire Terrier.
