= Sulcoplasty =

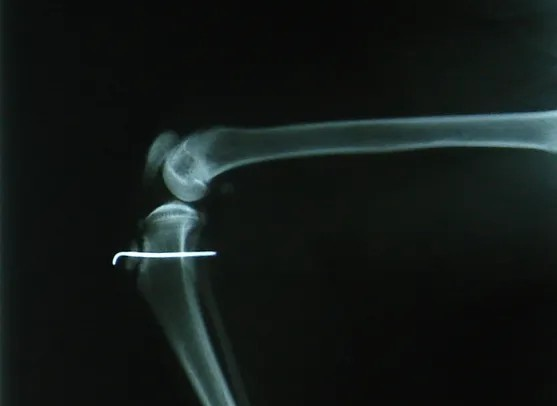
- X-Ray of corrected feline luxating patella
- Specialty: Orthopedic

Sulcoplasty is an orthopedic surgical procedure performed on a groove (sulcus) or indentation present on particular bones. In veterinary surgery it is often employed to remedy a displaced kneecap (luxating patella) by deepening the trochlear sulcus, the groove at the end of the femur on which the patella normally sits.
