= Laryngeal ventricle =

Body part

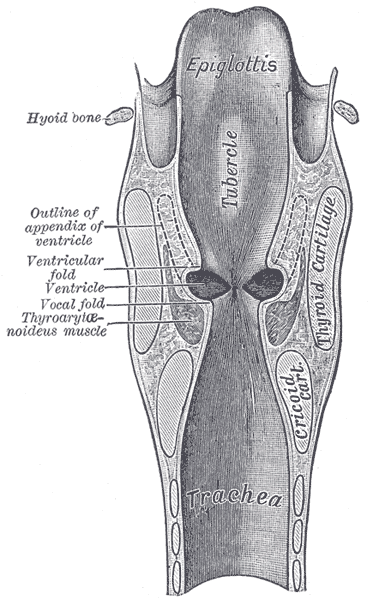
- Coronal section of larynx and upper part of trachea, with Ventricle labeled at center left.

Details

Identifiers
- Latin: ventriculus laryngis
- TA98: A06.2.09.010
- TA2: 3206
- FMA: 64171

The laryngeal ventricle, (also called the ventricle of the larynx, laryngeal sinus, or Morgagni's sinus) is a fusiform fossa, situated between the ventricular fold (aka ventricular fold or "false" vocal cord) and vocal folds (aka "true" vocal cords) on either side, and extending nearly their entire length. There is also a sinus of Morgagni in the pharynx.

The fossa is bounded, above, by the free crescentic edge of the vestibular ligament; below, by the straight margin of the vocal fold and laterally, by the mucous membrane covering the corresponding thyroarytenoid muscle.

The anterior part of the ventricle leads up by a narrow opening into a pouch-like diverticulum, a mucous membranous sac of variable size called the appendix of the laryngeal ventricle. The appendix (also called the laryngeal saccule, pouch or Hilton's pouch) extends vertically from the laryngeal ventricle. It runs between the vestibular fold, thyroarytenoid muscle, and thyroid cartilage, and is conical, bending slightly backward. It is covered in roughly seventy mucous glands. The muscles surrounding the appendix compress it until mucus is secreted to lubricate the vocal folds.

== Additional images ==
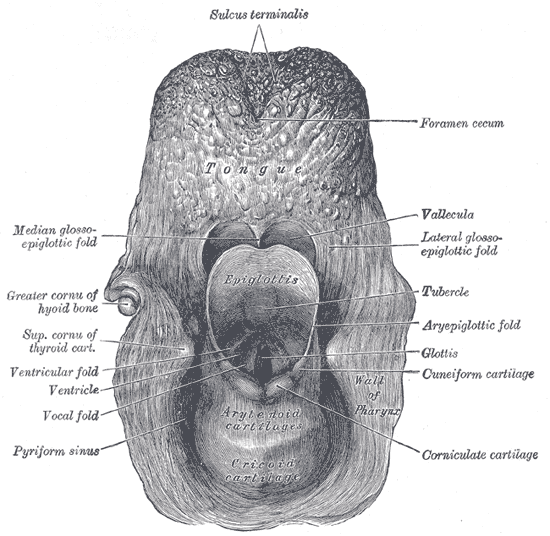
The entrance to the larynx, viewed from behind.

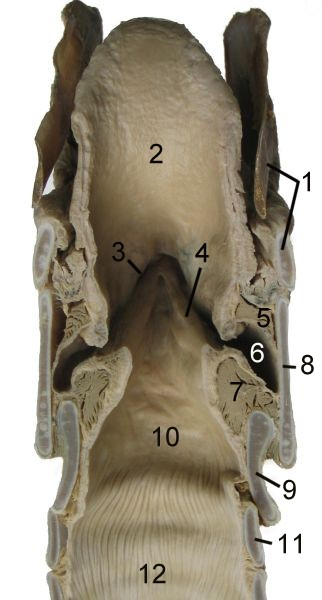
Cut through the larynx of a horse
