= Tracheal collapse =

Flattening of the trachea in animals

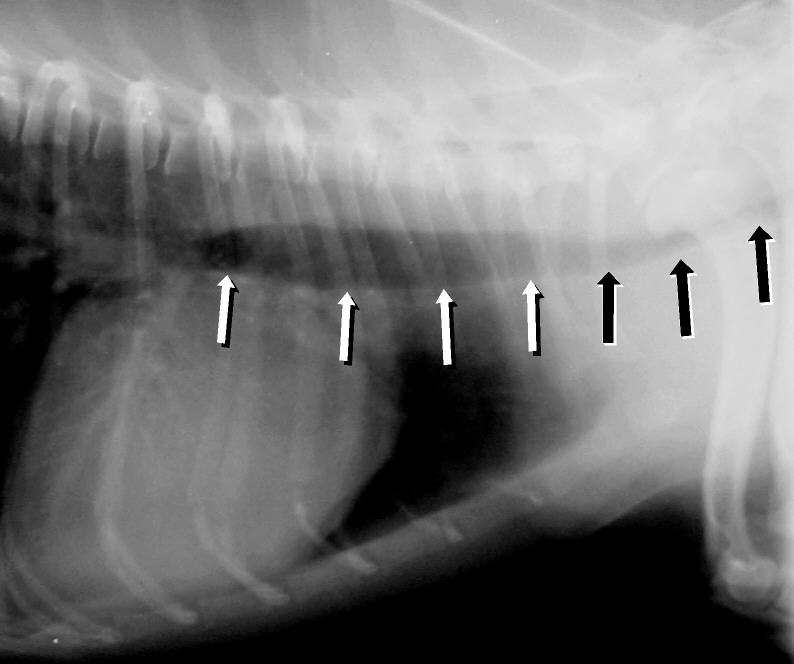
Tracheal collapse

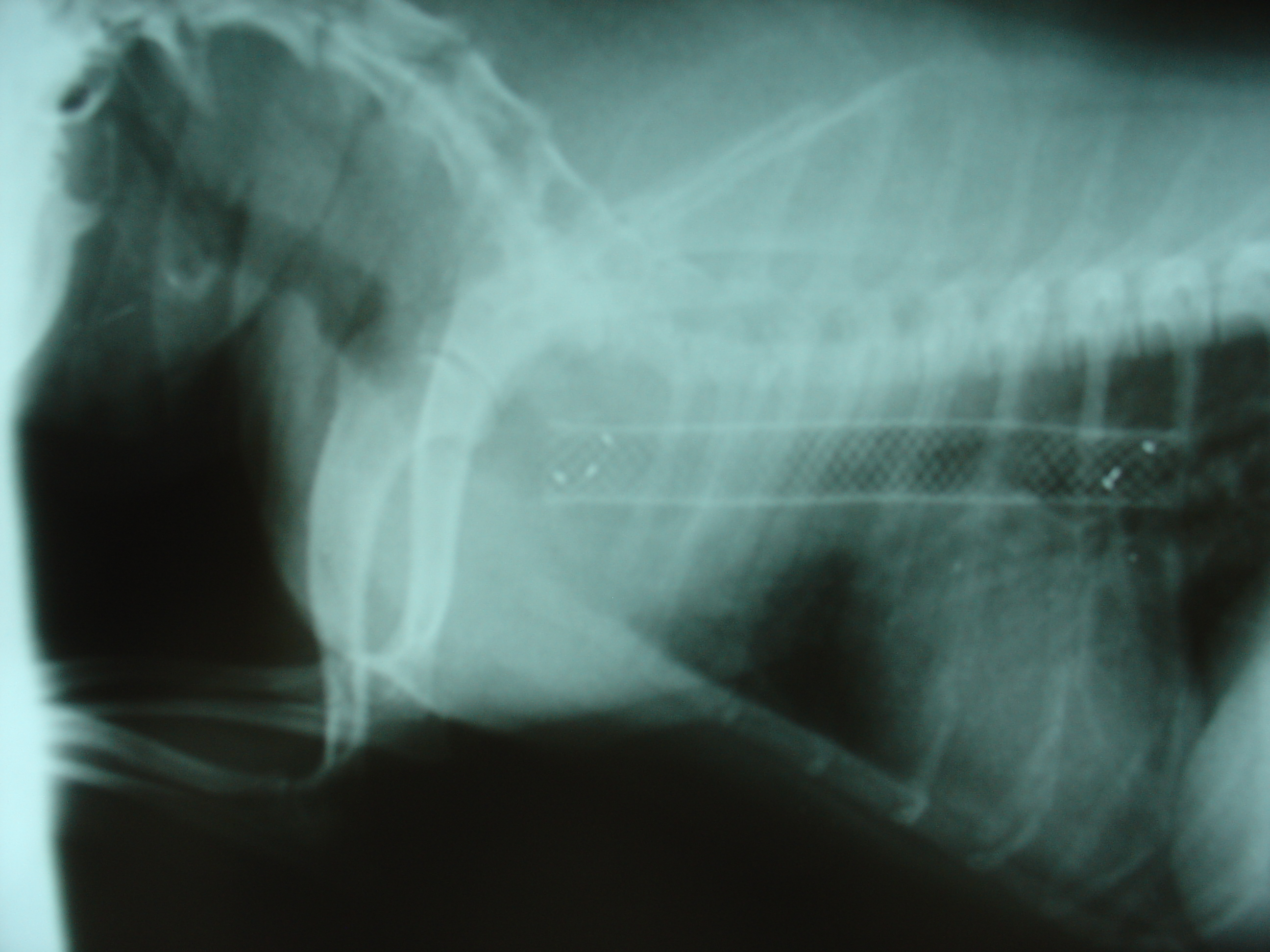
Tracheal stent in a dog

Tracheal collapse in dogs is a condition characterized by incomplete formation or weakening of the cartilaginous rings of the trachea resulting in flattening of the trachea. It can be congenital or acquired, and extrathoracic or intrathoracic (inside or outside the thoracic cavity). Tracheal collapse is a dynamic condition. Collapse of the cervical trachea or extrathoracic (in the neck) occurs during inspiration; collapse of the thoracic trachea or intrathoracic (in the chest) occurs during expiration. Tracheal collapse is most commonly found in small dog breeds, including the Chihuahua, Pomeranian, Toy Poodle, Shih Tzu, Lhasa Apso, Maltese, Pug, and Yorkshire Terrier.

Congenital tracheal collapse appears to be caused by a deficiency of normal components of tracheal ring cartilage like glycosaminoglycans, glycoproteins, calcium, and chondroitin. Acquired tracheal collapse can be caused by Cushing's syndrome, heart disease, and chronic respiratory disease and infection.

Symptoms include a cough (often called a "goose honk cough" due to its sound), especially when the dog is excited. This cough is usually paroxysmal in nature. Other symptoms include exercise intolerance, respiratory distress, and gagging while eating or drinking. Tracheal collapse is easily seen on a radiograph as a narrowing of the tracheal lumen. Treatment for mild to moderate cases include corticosteroids, bronchodilators, and antitussives. Medical treatment is successful in about 70 percent of tracheal collapse cases. Severe cases can be treated with surgical implantation of a tracheal stent (inside or outside of the trachea) or prosthetic rings. Extraluminal (outside the trachea) stenting is generally used only for tracheal collapse in the neck region. Intraluminal stenting has shown more promise for success with intrathoracic cases, especially using nitinol, a type of shape memory alloy composed of nickel and titanium. Potential problems include stent migration and fracture.

Tracheal collapse has also been described in horses, both as a congenital condition and as a result of trauma. It is most commonly seen in the cervical trachea.

== See also ==
- Laryngeal saccules
