= Australian Silky Terrier =

Australian Silky Terrier Silky Terrier
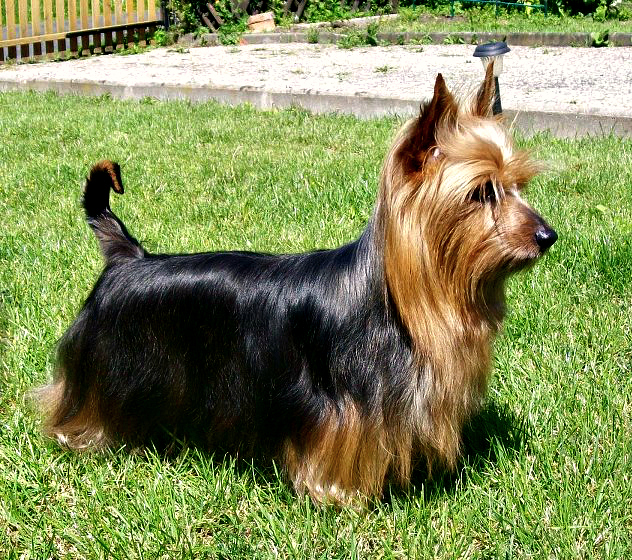
- Silky Terrier
- Other names: Silky Terrier
- Origin: Australia
Traits
Height	Males	23–26 cm (9–10 in)
- Coat: Flat, fine, glossy and silky
- Color: Blue, tan
Kennel club standards
- ANKC: standard
- Fédération Cynologique Internationale: standard

The Australian Silky Terrier or simply Silky Terrier (depending on the breed registry) is a small breed of dog of the terrier dog type. The breed was developed in Australia, although the ancestral types and breeds were from Great Britain. It is closely related to the Australian Terrier and the Yorkshire Terrier. The breed is called the Silky Terrier in North America, but is called the Australian Silky Terrier in its country of origin and in the rest of the world.

== Appearance ==
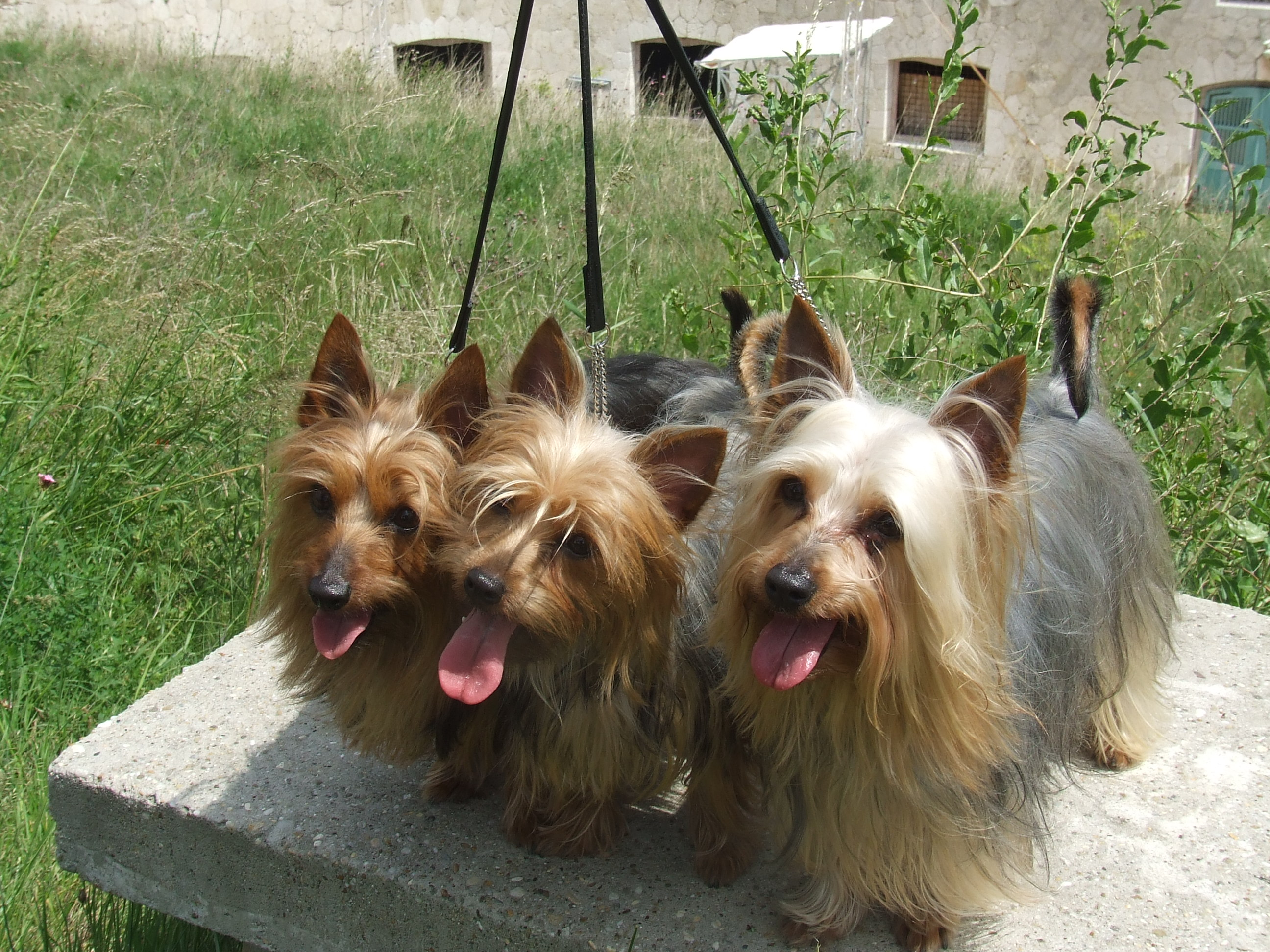
Australian Silky Terriers

The Australian Silky Terrier is a small and compact short-legged terrier, 23 to 26 cm (9.1 to 10.2 in) at the withers, alert and active. The long silky grey and white or blue and tan coat is an identifying feature, hanging straight and parted along the back, and described as "flat, fine and glossy".

The Silky Terrier should be slightly longer than tall (about one fifth longer than the height at withers). This is a dog that was historically used for hunting and killing rodents and snakes, so its body should have enough substance to fit this role. The coat requires regular grooming to avoid tangled and retain its silkiness.

The Silky Terrier has a strong, wedge-shaped head. The eyes are small and almond-shaped. According to the standards, light-colored eyes are considered a fault. The ears are small and carried erect. The Silky Terrier has a high-set tail and small, almost catlike, feet. The coat should be long, but not floor length. The hair on the face and ears is normally cut.

== History ==
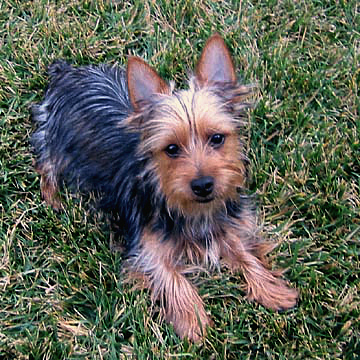
A Silky Terrier puppy.

The ancestors of the Australian Silky Terrier include the Yorkshire Terrier and the Australian Terrier (which descends from the rough coated type terriers brought from Great Britain to Australia in the early 19th century); few records indicate whether early dogs were just Australian Terriers born with silky fur, or whether there was an attempt to create a separate breed. According to the American Kennel Club, the breed was created at the end of the 19th century when Yorkshire Terriers were crossed with Australian Terriers. At first the breed was known as the Sydney Silky, as it was found primarily in the city of Sydney, Australia. Although most other Australian breeds were working dogs, the Silky Terrier was bred primarily to be an urban pet and companion, although it is also known for killing snakes in Australia.

Up until 1929 the Australian Terrier, the Australian Silky Terrier, and the Yorkshire Terrier were not clearly defined. Dogs of three different breeds might be born in the same litter, to be separated by appearance into the different types once they were grown. After 1932 in Australia, further crossbreeding was discouraged, and in 1955 the breed's name officially became the Australian Silky Terrier. The breed was recognised by the Australian National Kennel Council in 1958 in the Toy Group.

During and after World War II American servicemen who had been stationed in Australia brought back to the United States a few Silky Terriers. Newspaper photographs of the breed in 1954 caused an upsurge of popularity and hundreds of Silkies were imported from Australia to the United States. The American Kennel Club recognised the breed as the Silky Terrier in 1959, as did the United Kennel Club (US) in 1965 where it is shown as a Terrier; it is also recognised as the Silky Terrier by the Canadian Kennel Club. The breed is recognised by all the major kennel clubs in the English speaking world, and internationally by the Fédération Cynologique Internationale as breed number 236.

The Australian Silky Terrier is a terrier, but is usually placed in the Toy Group rather than the Terrier Group due to its small size. The Fédération Cynologique Internationale has a special section of the Terrier Group that includes only the smallest dogs, while other kennel clubs place the breed in the Toy Group, but it is universally agreed that the breed's type is Terrier.

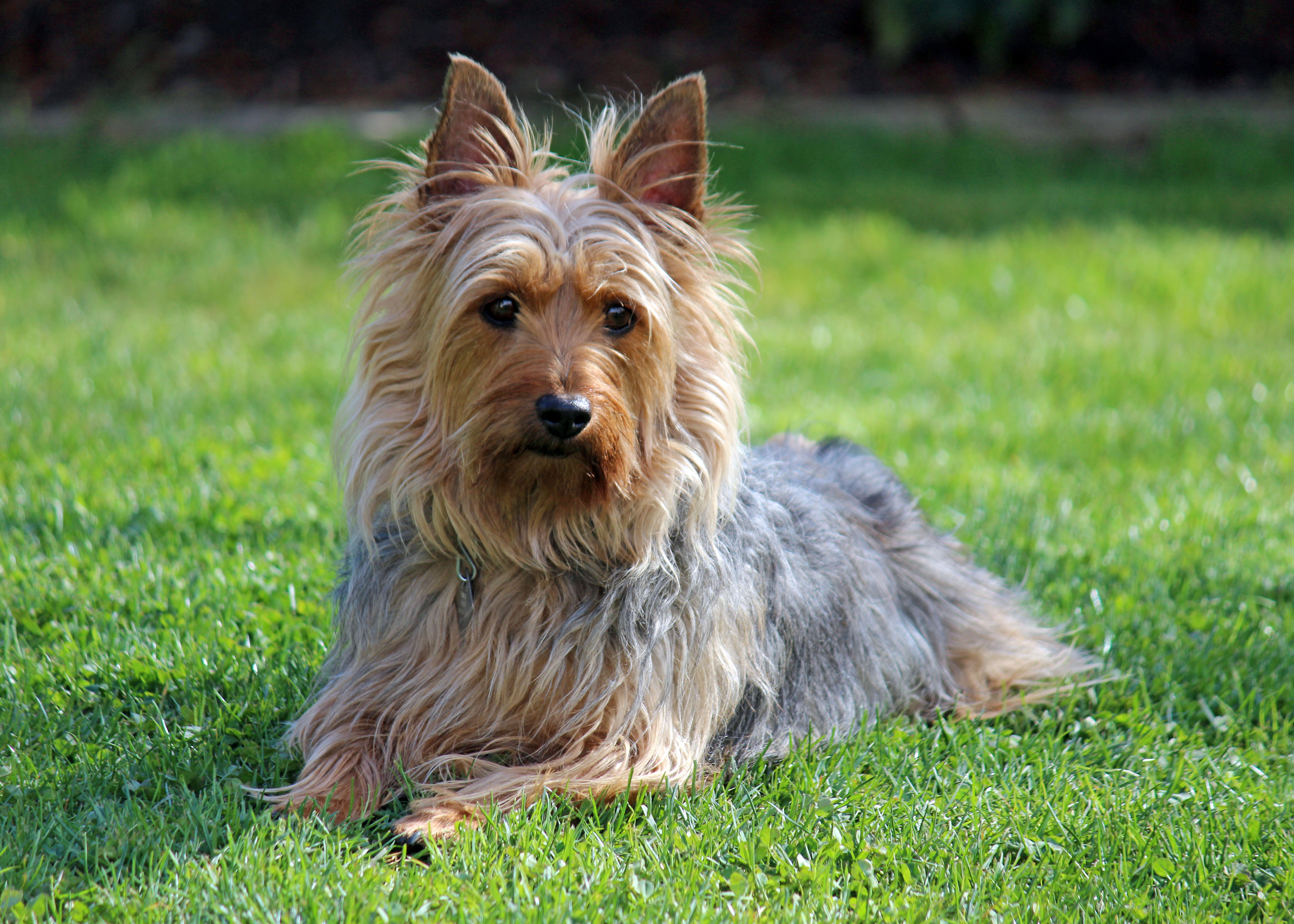
An adult male Silky Terrier.

== Temperament ==
The breed standard describe the ideal Australian Silky Terrier temperament as keenly alert and active. While still an energetic breed, they are somewhat less active than other terriers. In a survey administered by Dogs 101, ninety-one small breed dogs (16 inches tall and under 22 lbs) were ranked by ability to learn quickly - the Silky Terrier placed in the top twenty. However, training one can be difficult, as this breed is often stubborn and deliberately willful.

They are more independent than other toy breeds, yet are affectionate and loyal to their owners. They bark readily, especially when greeting strangers.

== Health ==
A 2024 UK study found a life expectancy of 13.3 years from a sample of 45 deaths for the breed compared to an average of 12.7 for purebreeds and 12 for crossbreeds.

== See also ==
- List of dog breeds
- Yorkshire Terrier
- Australian Terrier
