= Yorkshire Terrier =

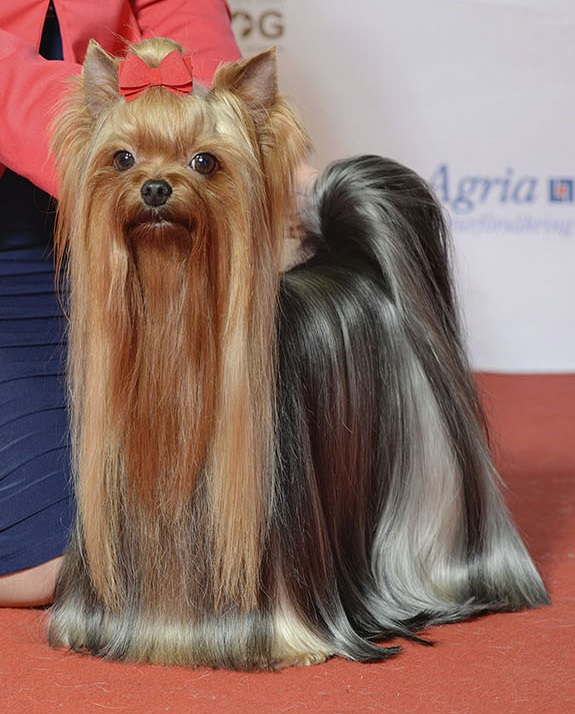
- Origin: Yorkshire, England
Traits
- Weight: not over 3.2 kg (7 lb)
Kennel club standards
- The Kennel Club: standard
- Fédération Cynologique Internationale: standard

The Yorkshire Terrier, also known as a Yorkie, is a British breed of toy dog of terrier type. It is among the smallest of the terriers and indeed of all dog breeds, with a weight of no more than 3.2 kg (7 lb). It originated in the nineteenth century in the English county of Yorkshire, after which it is named. The coat is tan on the head and dark steel-grey on the body; no other colour is accepted by either The Kennel Club or the Fédération Cynologique Internationale.

It is playful and energetic, usually kept as a companion dog. It has contributed to the development of other breeds including the Silky Terrier, and also to cross-breeds such as the Yorkipoo.

== History ==
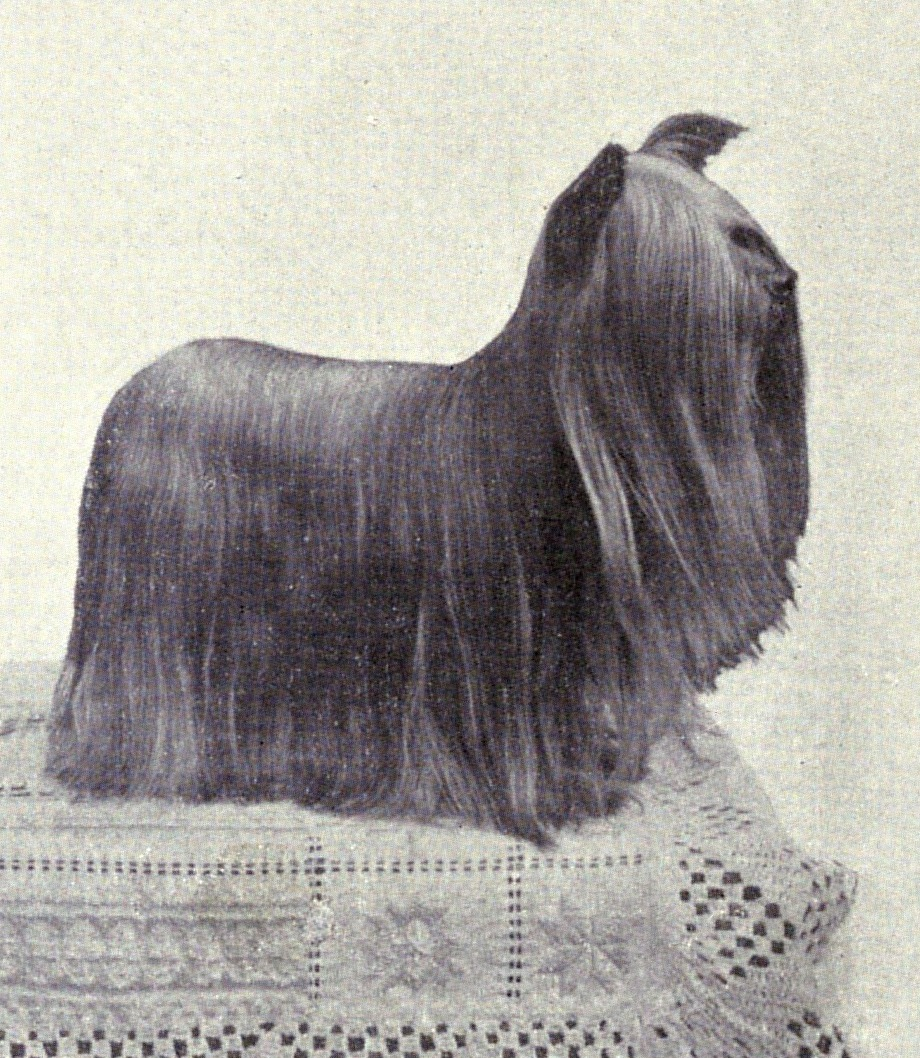
A Yorkshire Terrier from 1915

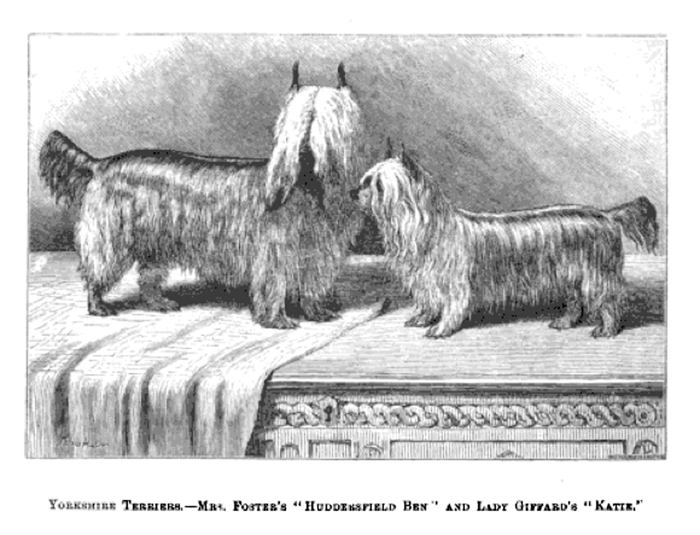
Two Yorkshire Terriers—Mrs. Foster's "Huddersfield Ben" and Lady Giffard's "Katie" (c. 1870)

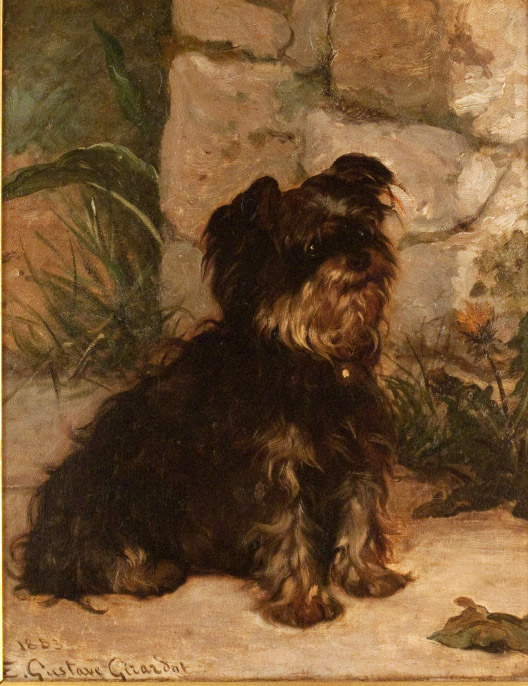
A painting from the 19th century depicting a Yorkshire-like terrier by Ernest Gustave Girardot

The Yorkshire Terrier originated in Yorkshire. In the mid-nineteenth century, workers from Scotland came to Yorkshire in search of work and brought with them several varieties of terrier dogs. Breeding of the Yorkshire terrier was "principally accomplished by the people – mostly operatives in cotton and woollen mills – in the counties of Yorkshire and Lancashire." In the 1800s, miners wanting to develop a ratting terrier, bred Black-and-Tan Terriers with the Paisley and Clydesdale Terriers.

Details are scarce. Mrs A. Foster is quoted as saying in 1886,

If we consider that the mill operatives who originated the breed were nearly all ignorant men, unaccustomed to imparting information for public use, we may see some reason why reliable facts have not been easily attained.

The breed originates from two distinct dogs, a male named Old Crab, a female named Kitty, and another female whose name is not known. The Paisley Terrier, a smaller version of the Skye Terrier that was bred for a beautiful long silky coat, also figured into the early dogs. Some authorities believed that the Maltese was used as well. "They were all originally bred from Scotch Terriers (meaning dogs from Scotland, not today's Scottish Terrier) and shown as such the name Yorkshire Terrier was given to them on account of their being improved so much in Yorkshire."

Yorkshire Terriers were shown in a dog show category (class) at the time called "Rough and Broken-coated, Broken-haired Scotch and Yorkshire Terriers". Hugh Dalziel, writing in 1878, says that "the classification of these dogs at shows and in the Kennel Club Stud Book is confusing and absurd" in lumping together these different types. In the early days of the breed, "almost anything in the shape of a Terrier having a long coat with blue on the body and fawn or silver coloured head and legs, with tail docked and ears trimmed, was received and admired as a Yorkshire Terrier". But in the late 1860s, a popular Paisley-type Yorkshire Terrier show dog named Huddersfield Ben, owned by a woman living in Yorkshire, Mary Ann Foster, was seen at dog shows throughout Great Britain, and defined the breed type for the Yorkshire Terrier. By 1903, Yorkshire Terriers for show exhibitions were defined by having "a neat compact body with level back and loins, and the hair must be perfectly straight, as fine and as soft as silk, which it should strongly resemble. In colour, it ought to be a deep steel blue, free from intermingling of any other coloured hairs."

=== Huddersfield Ben ===
Huddersfield Ben was a Yorkshire Terrier whose portrait was painted by George Earl and in 1891 an authority on the breed wrote, "Huddersfield Ben was the best stud dog of his breed during his lifetime, and one of the most remarkable dogs of any pet breed that ever lived; and most of the show specimens of the present day have one or more crosses of his blood in their pedigree." A show winner, Huddersfield Ben, through his puppies, helped define the Yorkshire Terrier breed. He is still referred to as "father of the breed".

=== In North America ===
The Yorkshire Terrier was introduced in North America in 1872 and the first Yorkshire Terrier was registered with the American Kennel Club (AKC) in 1885. During the Victorian era, the Yorkshire Terrier was a popular pet and show dog in England, and as Americans embraced Victorian customs, so too did they embrace the Yorkshire Terrier. The breed's popularity dipped in the 1940s, when the percentage of small breed dogs registered fell to an all-time low of 18% of total registrations. Smoky, a Yorkshire Terrier and famous war dog from World War II, is credited with beginning a renewal of interest in the breed. The AKC ranked the Yorkshire Terrier as the 6th most popular purebred in the United States in 2012 and 2013. It has since fallen to 11th of 202 in 2024.

== Coat ==
For adult Yorkshire Terriers, The American Kennel Club places importance on coat colour, quality, and texture. According to The Kennel Club (UK), the hair must be glossy, fine, straight, and silky. Traditionally the coat is grown out very long and is parted down the middle of the back, but "must never impede movement.". The hair of the Yorkshire Terrier can be used to determine content of metals in the dog organism.

From the back of the neck to the base of the tail, the coat should be a dark grey to a black colour, and the hair on the tail should be a darker black. According to the American Kennel Club Breed Standard, on the head, high chest and legs, the hair should be a bright, rich tan, darker at the roots than in the middle, that shades into a lighter tan at the tips, but not for all dogs. Also, in adult dogs there should be no black hairs intermingled with any of the tan-coloured fur. The fine, straight, silky coat is considered hypoallergenic.

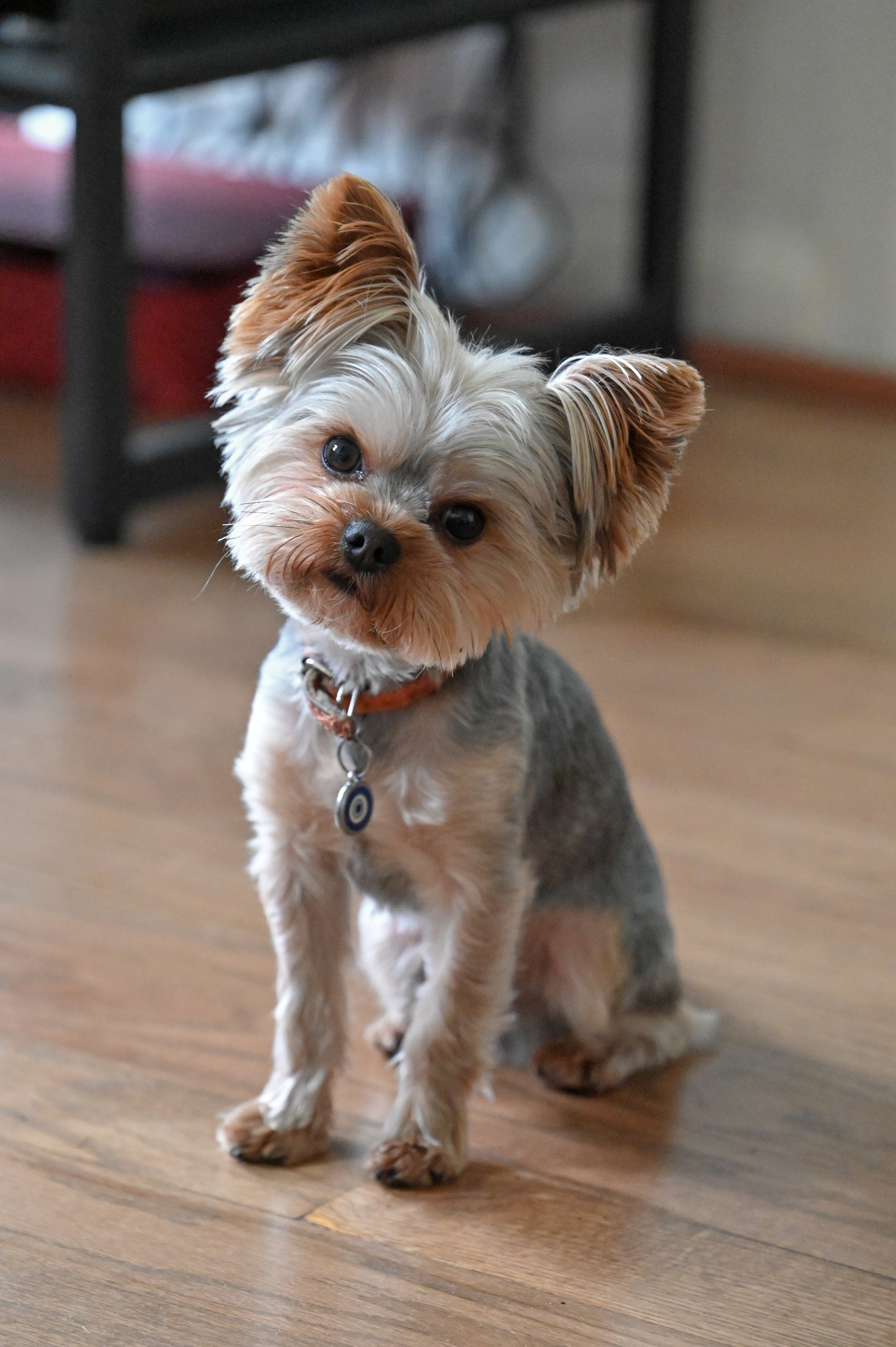
A 2.5-year-old, four-pound (1.8 kg), silver and brown Yorkshire Terrier with a fresh, short haircut

A 4-year-old Yorkshire Terrier with a fluffy, medium-length coat and tan facial markings.

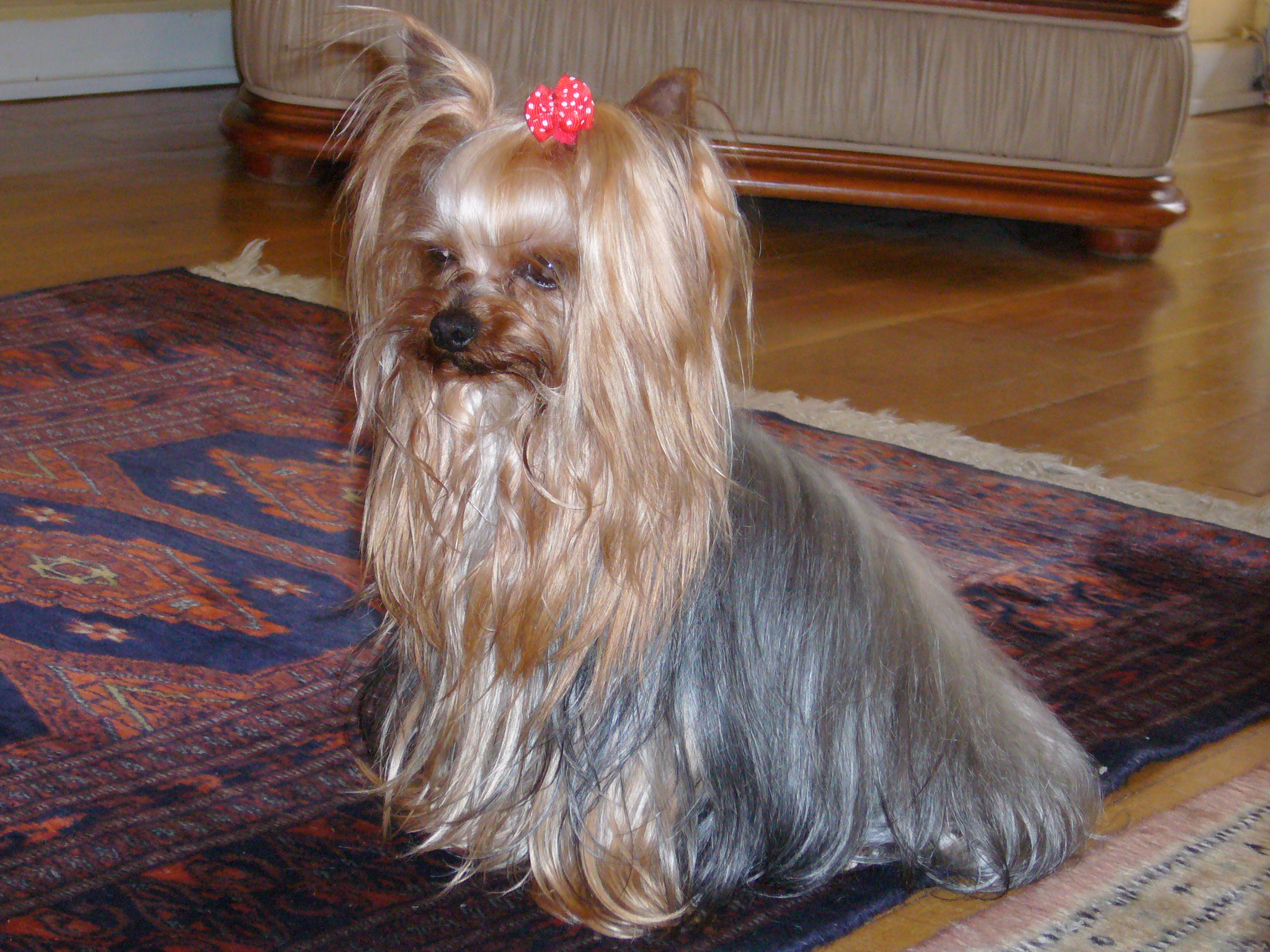
A silver-blue and pale cream Yorkshire Terrier, with characteristic long hair

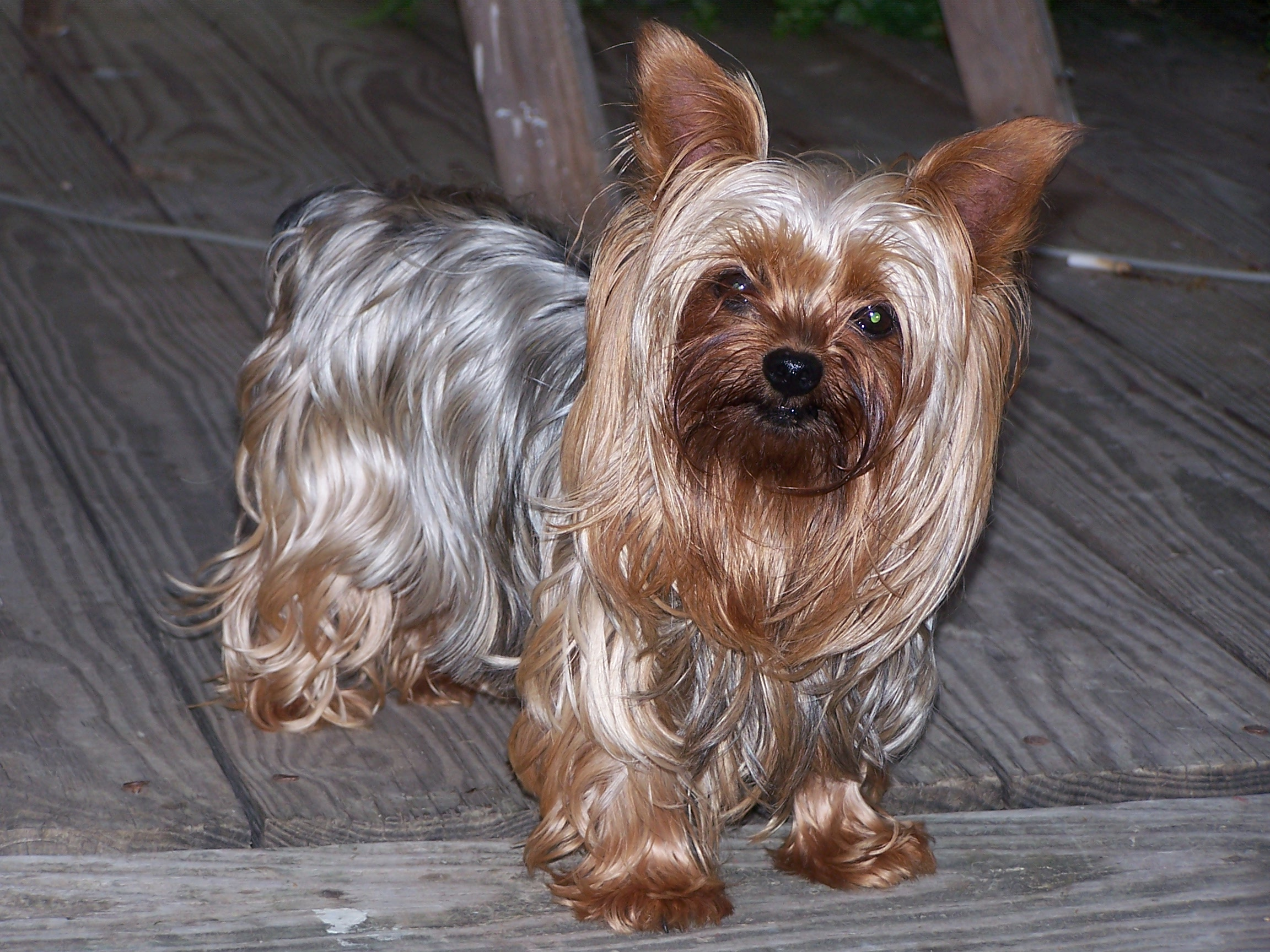
A silver-blue and pale cream Yorkshire Terrier

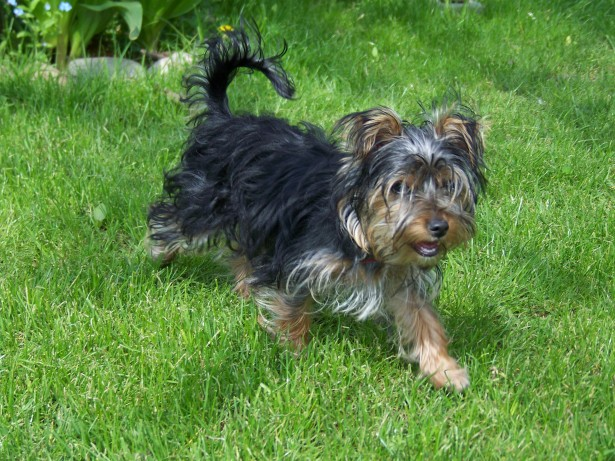
A Yorkshire Terrier with a dark coat

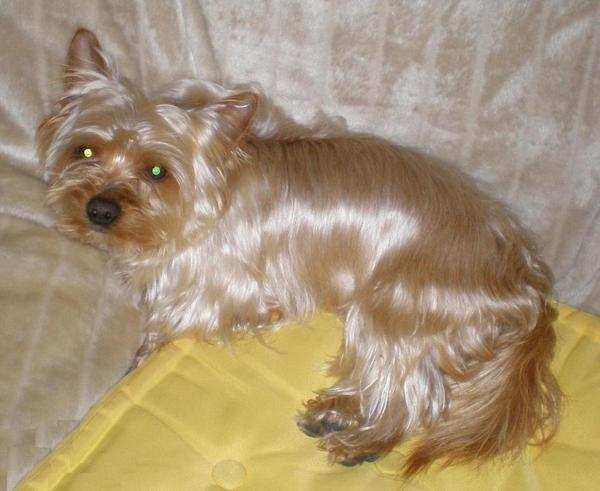
Golden Yorkie, judged as miscolour in normal Yorkshire breeding. The saddle is missing due to the recessive gene for red on the extension locus (see Dog coat genetics).

Adult Yorkshire Terriers whose coat colours deviate from the standard, or that have woolly or extra fine coats, are still Yorkshire Terriers. The only difference is that it is not recommended to intentionally breed atypical Yorkshire Terriers. In addition, care may be more difficult for "woolly" or "cottony" textured coats, or coats that are overly fine. Coats may vary in colour. For example, a mature Yorkie may have a silver-blue with light brown, while another might have a black and creamy colour.

The long coat on the Yorkshire Terrier requires regular brushing.

=== Hypoallergenic coats ===
The typical fine, straight, and silky Yorkshire Terrier coat has also been listed by many popular dog information websites as being hypoallergenic. In comparison with many other breeds, Yorkies do not shed to the same degree, losing small amounts when bathed or brushed. The dog's dander and saliva typically trigger allergic reactions. Allergists recognise that at times a particular allergy patient will be able to tolerate a particular dog, but they agree that "the luck of the few with their pets cannot be stretched to fit all allergic people and entire breeds of dogs." The Yorkshire Terrier coat is said to fall out only when brushed or broken, or just said to not shed. Although neither of those statements agree with what biologists, veterinarians, and allergists know about dog fur, allergists "think there really are differences in protein production between dogs that may help one patient and not another".

=== Other colours ===
The Yorkshire Terrier is a tan dog with a blue saddle. Particolours exist, although they are not correct for the breed standard. The particolour coat is white with black-blue and tan. The white is caused by the recessive piebald gene. It is very rare to get a particolour, and if one is found, it tends to be very expensive. Some Yorkshire Terriers are solid golden, they only produce pheomelanin, others are liver or chocolate, a brown colour; they produce brown eumelanin instead of black eumelanin. The standard prescribes clearly defined fur-colours, and non-standard colours may indicate crossbreeding with other breeds or in rare cases even health problems. The AKC registration form for Yorkshire Terriers allows for four choices: blue and tan, blue and gold, black and tan, black and gold. Colour alone will not affect whether or not a dog is a good companion and pet. Even though off-coloured Yorkshire Terriers are advertised at premium prices, being of an unusual or atypical colour is neither new, desirable, nor exotic.

Mismatched Yorkshire Terriers should not be crossed with the Biewer Terrier, a new breed that originated in Germany. Although the AKC will not deny registration of a Yorkshire Terrier on colour alone, meaning that particolours are registerable with the AKC, the Yorkshire Terrier Club of America has a directive that "any solid colour or combination of colours other than black and tan" for adult dogs is a disqualification, and "dogs of solid colour, unusual combination of colours, and particolours should be disqualified."

=== Puppy coats ===
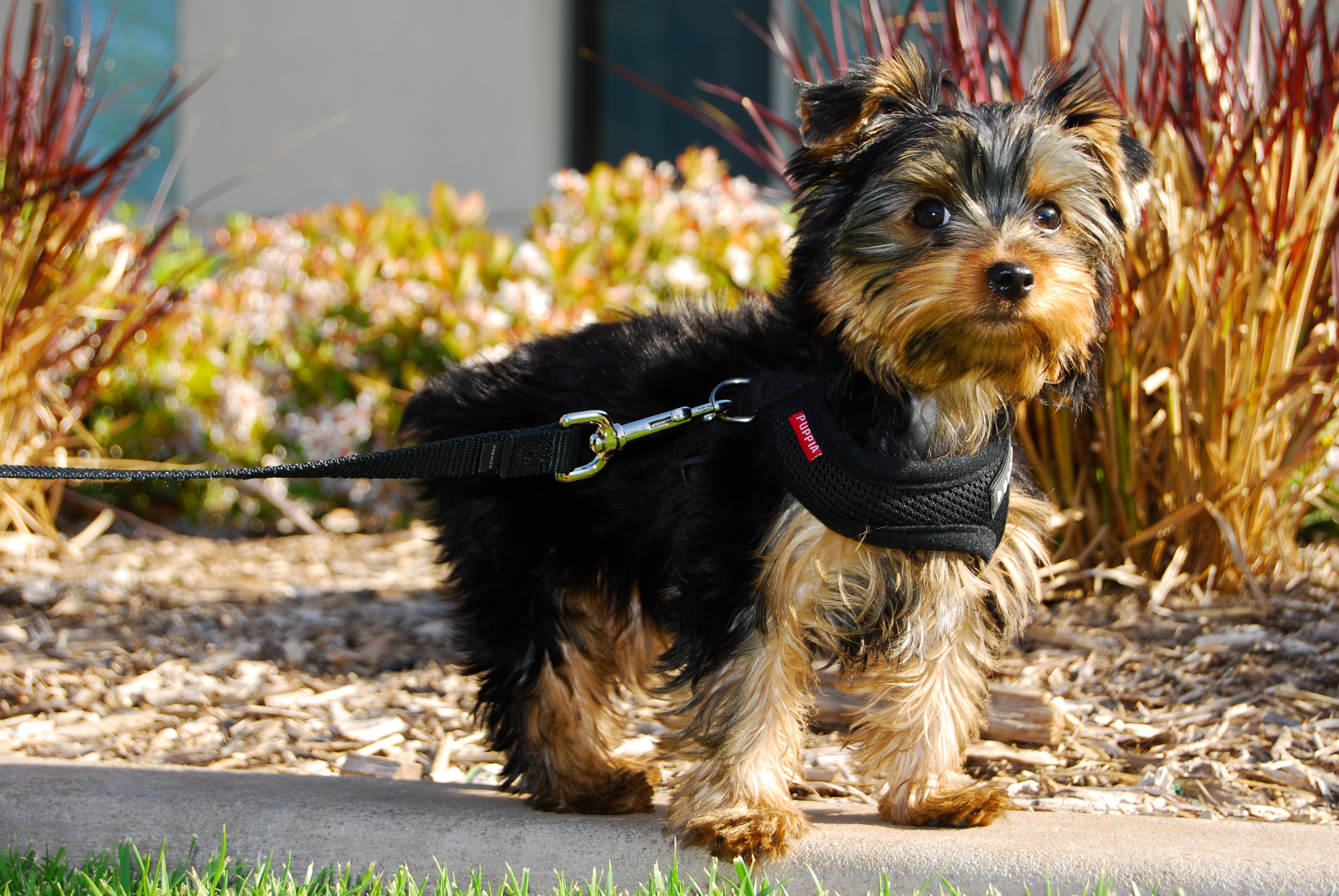
A Yorkshire Terrier puppy, displaying a black and tan coat

It may take three or more years for the coat to reach its final colour. The final colour is usually a black or greyish colour. P. H. Combs, writing in 1891, complained about show wins awarded to puppies, when the dog's coat does not fully come in until three or four years old, "and the honour of winning such a prize (for a puppy) can therefore be of but little practical benefit to the owner" since the adult dog's colour cannot be exactly predicted.

=== Coat care ===
Owners may trim the hair short for easier care. For shows, the coat is left long, and may be trimmed to floor length to give ease of movement and a neater appearance. Hair on the feet and the tips of ears can also be trimmed. The traditional long coat is extremely high maintenance. The coat might get knotted if not brushed daily (a bristle brush for short and shaved coat and a pin brush for long coat). In order to prevent breakage, the coat may be wrapped in washi paper, tissue paper or plastic, after a light oiling with a coat oil. The oil has to be washed out once a month and the wraps must be fixed periodically during the week to prevent them from sliding down and breaking the hair. Elaborate coat care dates from the earliest days of the breed. In 1878, John Walsh described similar preparations: the coat is "well greased" with coconut oil, the dog is bathed weekly, and the dog's feet are "carefully kept in stockings".

== Temperament ==
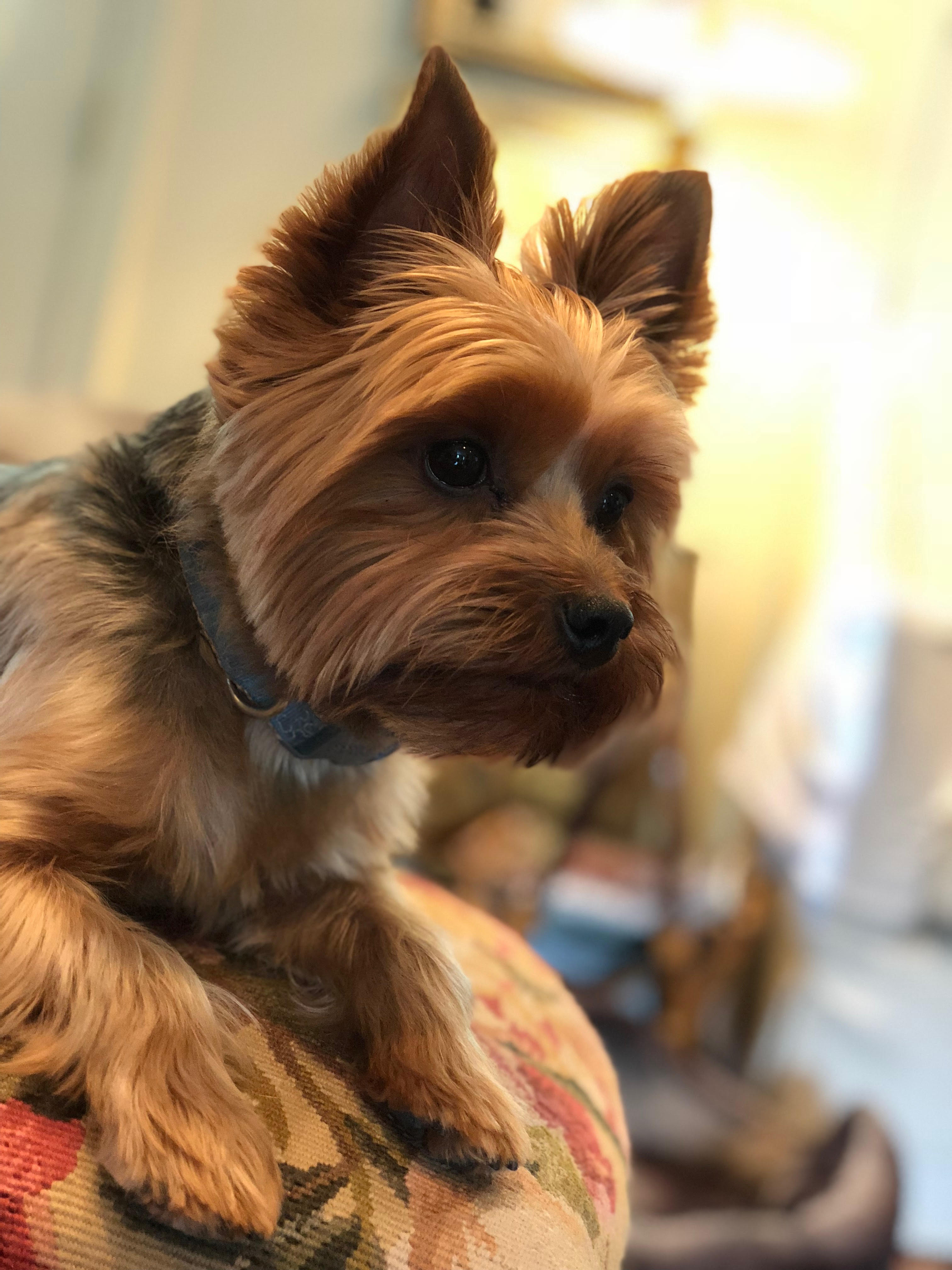
The Yorkshire Terrier character is described as "conveying an important air". According to the standard, the dog's high head carriage and confident manner should give the appearance of vigor and self-importance.

The ideal Yorkshire Terrier character or "personality" has been described by the Kennel Club as having a "carriage very upright conveying an important air".

Yorkshire Terriers are ranked 27th in Stanley Coren's The Intelligence of Dogs.

== Health ==
Health issues often seen in the Yorkshire Terrier include bronchitis, lymphangiectasia, portosystemic shunt, cataracts, and keratitis sicca. Additionally, Yorkies often have a delicate digestive system, with vomiting or diarrhoea resulting from consumption of foods outside of a regular diet. The relatively small size of the Yorkshire Terrier means that it usually has a poor tolerance for anaesthesia. Additionally, a toy dog such as the Yorkie is more likely to be injured by falls, other dogs, and owner clumsiness.

The Yorkshire Terrier has an above average life expectancy. A 2013 study in the UK of patient records found the breed to have a life expectancy of 13 years, higher than the average. A similar 2022 study in the UK found the breed to have a life expectancy of 12 and a half years. A 2024 UK study found a life expectancy of 13.3 years for the breed compared to an average of 12.7 for purebreeds and 12 for crossbreeds. A study in Japan based on pet cemetery data found a life expectancy of 14.3 years, above the average life expectancy. A 2024 Italian study found a life expectancy of 13 years for the breed compared to 10 years overall.

Colour dilution alopecia, a form of alopecia associated with blue colour coats is common in the Yorkshire Terrier.

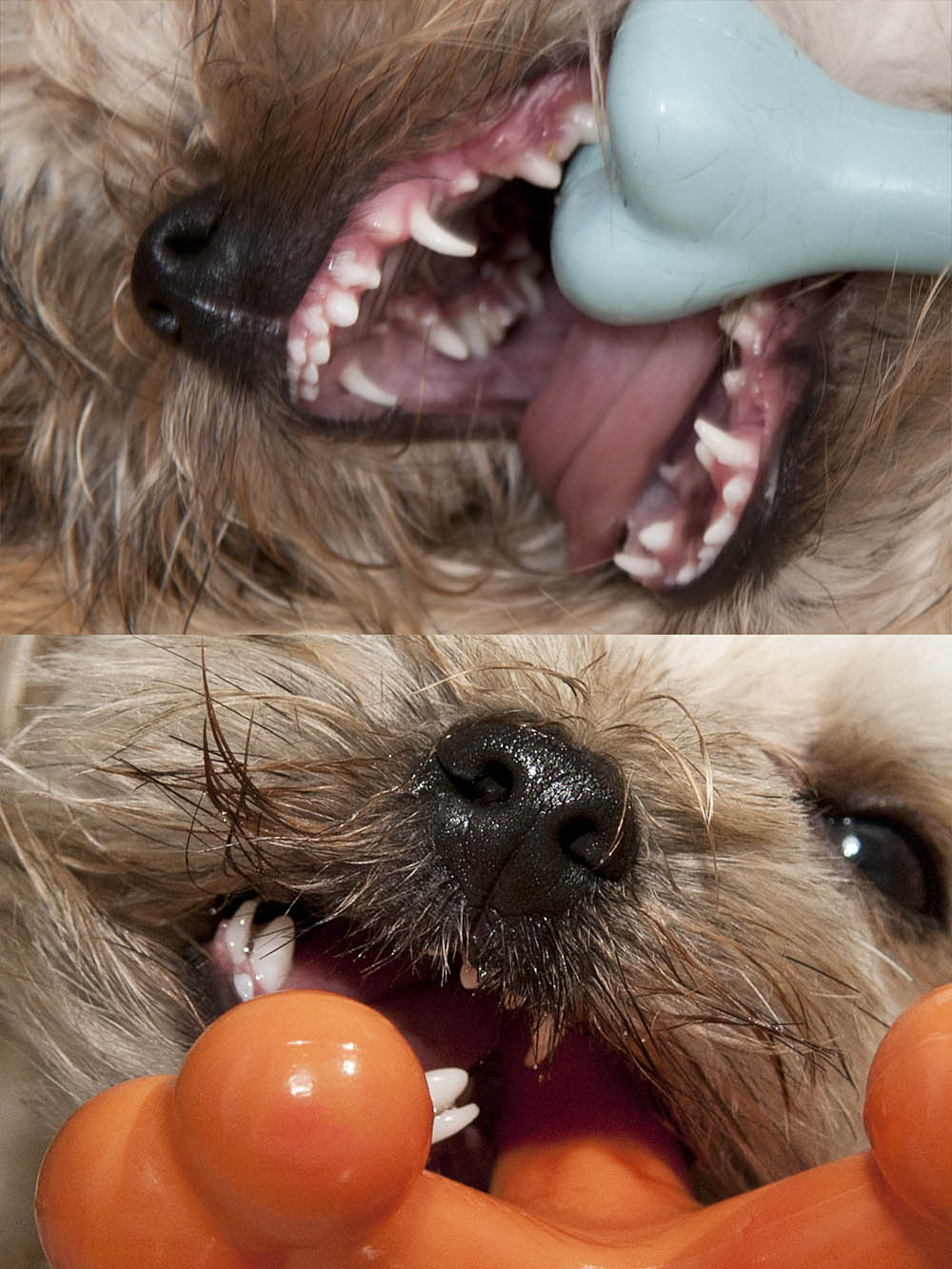
A Morkie (half Maltese, half Yorkshire Terrier) puppy with his deciduous teeth and adult teeth growing in

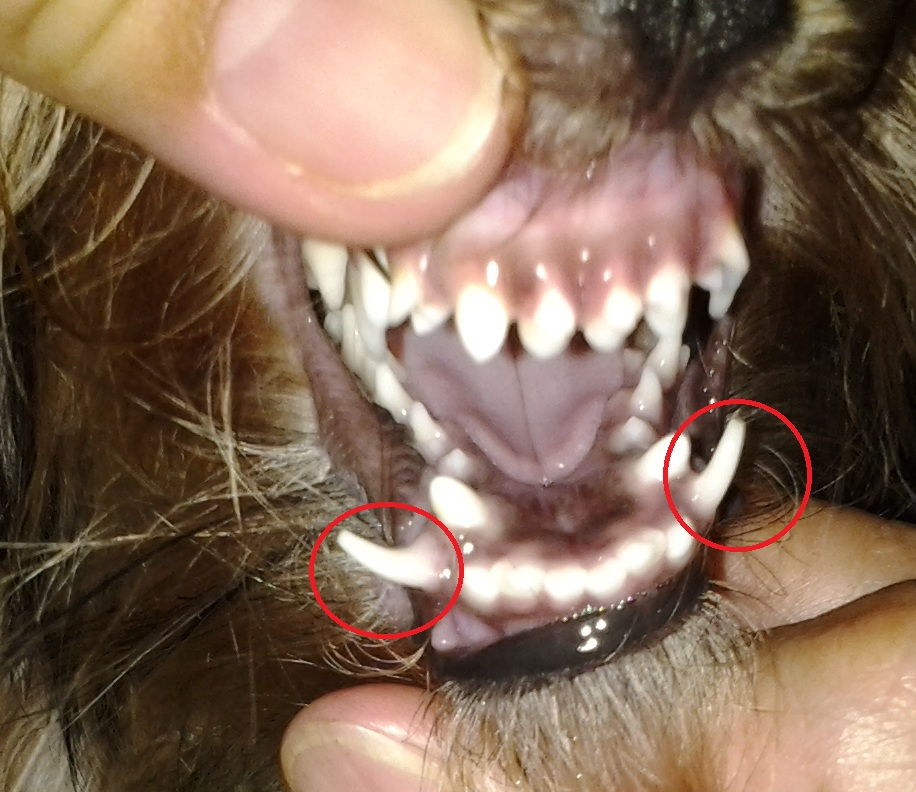
A Yorkshire Terrier's retained deciduous or baby fangs

Health conditions that can be found in Yorkshire Terriers, include distichiasis, hydrocephalus, hypoplasia of dens, Legg–Calvé–Perthes syndrome, luxating patella, portosystemic shunt, retinal dysplasia, and bladder stones. The following are other health conditions that affect the breed:

- Distichiae, eyelashes arising from an abnormal spot (usually the duct of the meibomian gland at the edge of the eyelid), are often found in Yorkies. Distichiae can irritate the eye and cause tearing, squinting, inflammation, corneal abrasions or corneal ulcers, and scarring. Treatment options may include manual removal, electrolysis, or surgery.
- Hypoplasia of dens is a non-formation of the pivot point of the second cervical vertebra, which leads to spinal cord damage. Onset of the condition may occur at any age, producing signs ranging from neck pain to quadriplegia.
- Legg–Calvé–Perthes syndrome, which causes the top of the femur (thigh bone) to degenerate, occurs in Yorkies in certain lines. The condition appears to result from insufficient circulation to the area around the hip joint. As the blood supply is reduced, the bone in the head of the femur collapses and dies and the cartilage coating around it becomes cracked and deformed. Usually the disease appears when the Yorkie is young (between five and eight months of age); signs are pain, limping or lameness. The standard treatment is surgery to remove the affected part of the bone. Following surgery, muscles hold the femur in place and fibrous tissue forms in the area of removal to prevent bone rubbing on bone. Although the affected leg will be slightly shorter than prior to surgery, the Yorkie may regain almost normal use.
- Luxating patellas (slipping kneecaps) are another common defect considered to be genetic in Yorkies, although it may also be caused by an accidental fall. Weak ligaments and tendons in the knee or malformed (too shallow) patellar grooves, allow the patella to slip out of its groove sideways. This causes the leg to 'lock up' with the foot held off the ground. A dog with this problem may experience frequent pain and lameness, or may be bothered by it only on occasion. Over time, the patellar ridges can become worn down, making the groove even more shallow and causing the dog to become increasingly lame. Surgery is the main treatment option available for luxating patellas, although it is not necessary for every dog with the condition. The severity of luxating patellas are on a scale of 1 to 4, with 4 being the most severe. Many dogs will not develop past a stage 1 or 2.
- Portosystemic shunt, a congenital malformation of the portal vein (which brings blood to the liver for cleansing), is also common in Yorkies. In this condition some of the dog's blood bypasses the liver and the "dirty" blood goes on to poison the heart, brain, lungs and other organs with toxins. A Yorkie with this condition might exhibit a wide variety of symptoms, such as small stature, poor appetite, weak muscle development, decreased ability to learn, inferior coordination, occasional vomiting and diarrhoea, behavioral abnormalities, seizures (especially after a meal) and blindness, which could lead to a coma and death. Often, the shunt can be treated with surgery.

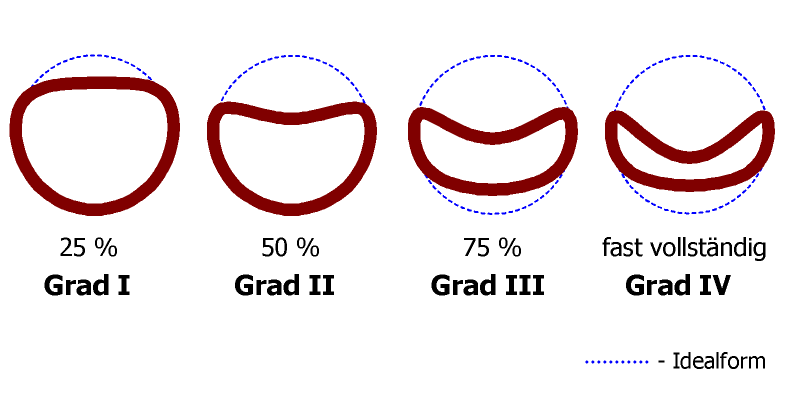
Tracheal collapse

- Tracheal collapse, caused by a progressive weakening of the walls of the trachea, occurs in many toy breeds, especially very tiny Yorkies. As a result of genetics, the walls of the trachea can be flaccid, a condition that becomes more severe with age. Cushing's syndrome, a disorder that causes production of excess steroid hormone by the adrenal glands, can also weaken cartilage and lead to tracheal collapse. There is a possibility that physical strain on the neck might cause or contribute to trachea collapse. Since this is usually caused by an energetic Yorkie pulling against his collar, many veterinarians recommend use of a harness for leashed walks. An occasional "goose honking" cough, especially on exertion or excitement, is usually the first sign of this condition. Over time, the cough may become almost constant in the Yorkie's later life. Breathing through the obstruction of a collapsed (or partially collapsed) trachea for many years can result in complications, including chronic lung disease. The coughing can be countered with cough suppressants and bronchodilators. If the collapse is advanced and unresponsive to medication, sometimes surgery can repair the trachea.

Yorkshire Terriers are highly susceptible to periodontal disease with a 2019 study finding that "98% of the dogs had at least one tooth or aspect with early periodontitis at 37 weeks of age."

A UK study found the Yorkshire Terrier to be 6.79 times more likely to acquire impaired hepatic perfusion compared to other dogs.

=== Hypoglycaemia ===
Low blood sugar in puppies, or transient juvenile hypoglycaemia, is caused by fasting (too much time between meals). In rare cases, hypoglycaemia may continue to be a problem in mature, usually very small, Yorkies. It is often seen in Yorkie puppies at 5 to 16 weeks of age. Very tiny Yorkie puppies are especially predisposed to hypoglycaemia because a lack of muscle mass makes it difficult to store glucose and regulate blood sugar. Factors such as stress, fatigue, a cold environment, poor nutrition, and a change in diet or feeding schedule may bring on hypoglycaemia. Low blood sugar can also be the result of a bacterial infection, parasite or portosystemic liver shunt. Hypoglycaemia causes the puppy to become drowsy, listless (glassy-eyed), shaky, uncpoglycaemic attack, the puppy usually has very pale or grey gums. The puppy also may not eat unless force-fed. Hypoglycaemia and dehydration seem to go hand-in-hand, and force-feeding or injecting fluids may also be necessary. Additionally, a hypoglycaemic Yorkie may have a lower than normal body temperature and, in extreme cases, may have a seizure or go into a coma. A dog showing symptoms should be given sugar in the form of corn syrup or Nutri-Cal and be treated by a veterinarian immediately, as prolonged or recurring attacks of hypoglycaemia can permanently damage the dog's brain. In severe cases, it can be fatal.

The Yorkshire Terrier is one of the more commonly affected breeds for progressive rod-cone degeneration. An autosomal recessive mutation in the PRCD gene is responsible for the condition in the breed.

=== Docking and Cropping ===
Traditionally, the Yorkshire Terrier's tail is docked to a medium length. Opposition to this practice began very early in the history of the breed; Hugh Dalziel, writing about Yorkshire Terriers in 1878, declared that "There is no reason for mutilating pet dogs, and perfect ears and tails should be bred, not clipped into shape with scissors." AKC and Canadian Kennel Club still require the Yorkie's tail be docked in order to compete at its events. The majority of the rest of the world has adopted a "no docking/no cropping" rule.

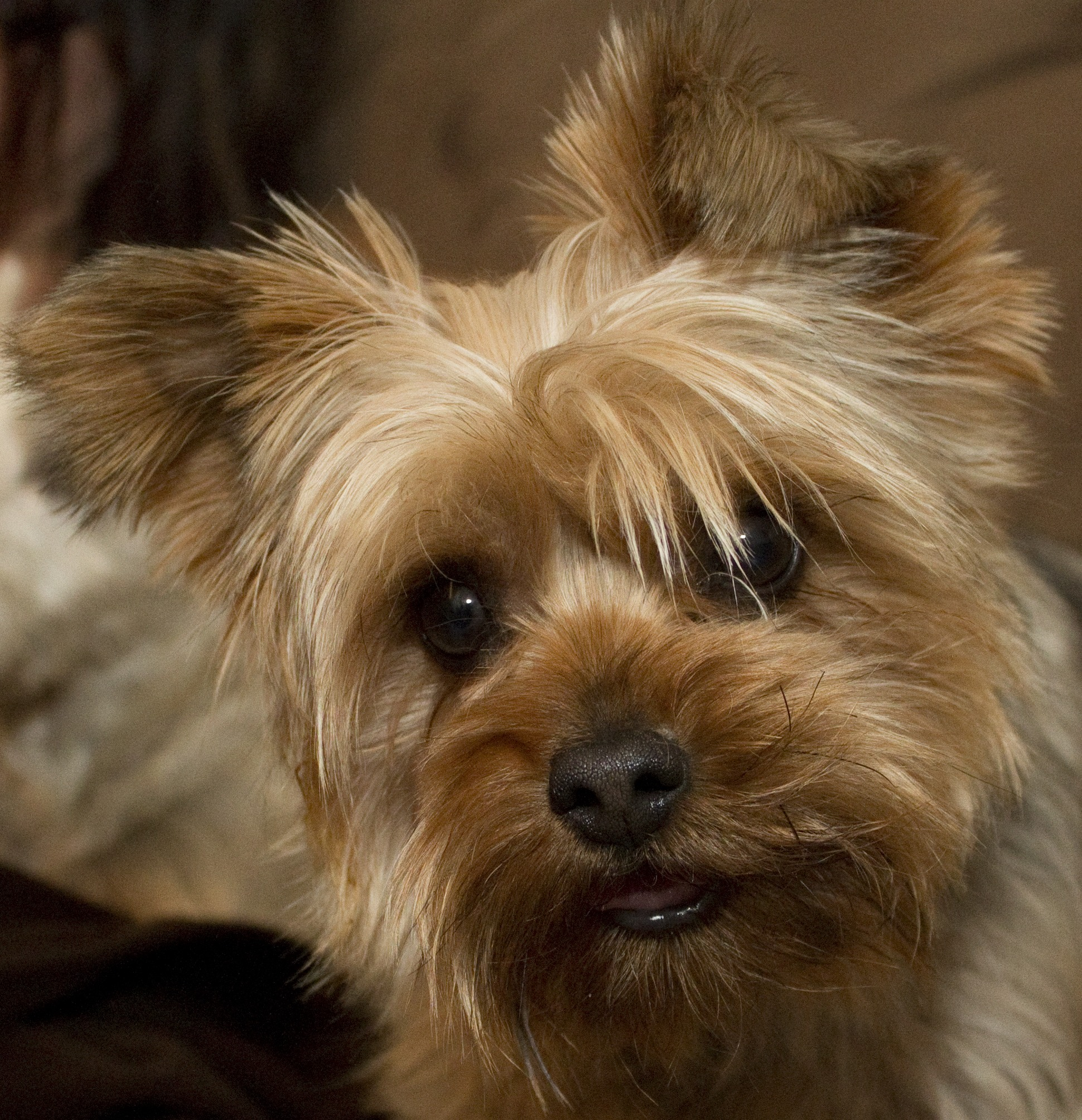
A Yorkshire Terrier, trimmed

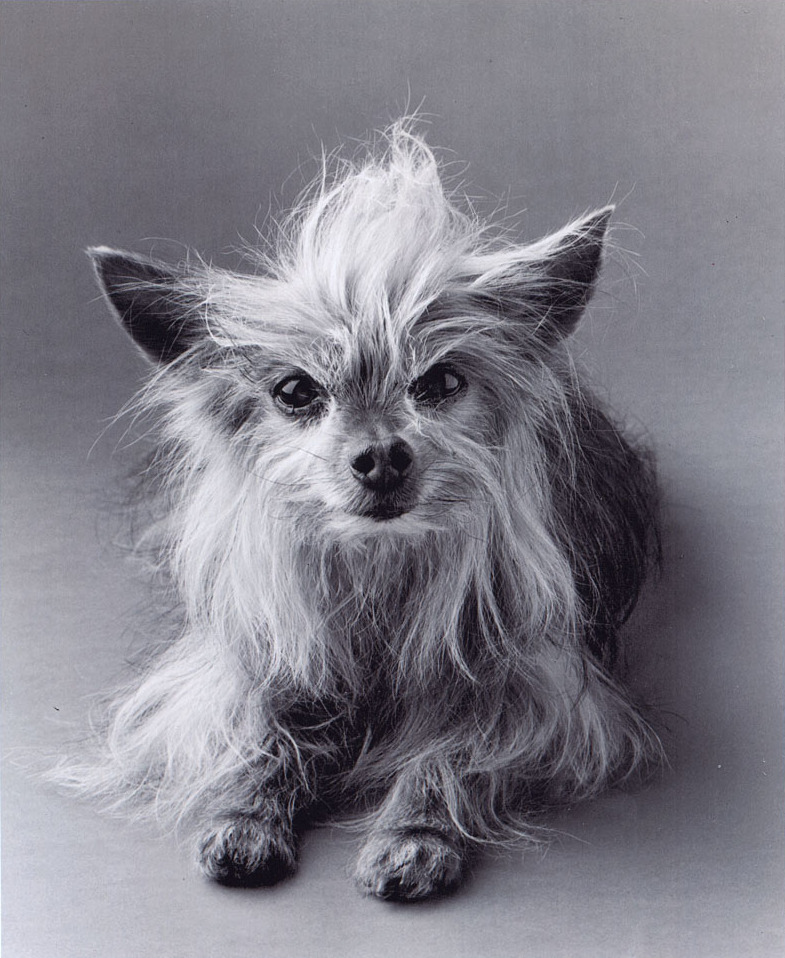
A Yorkshire Terrier in need of brushing

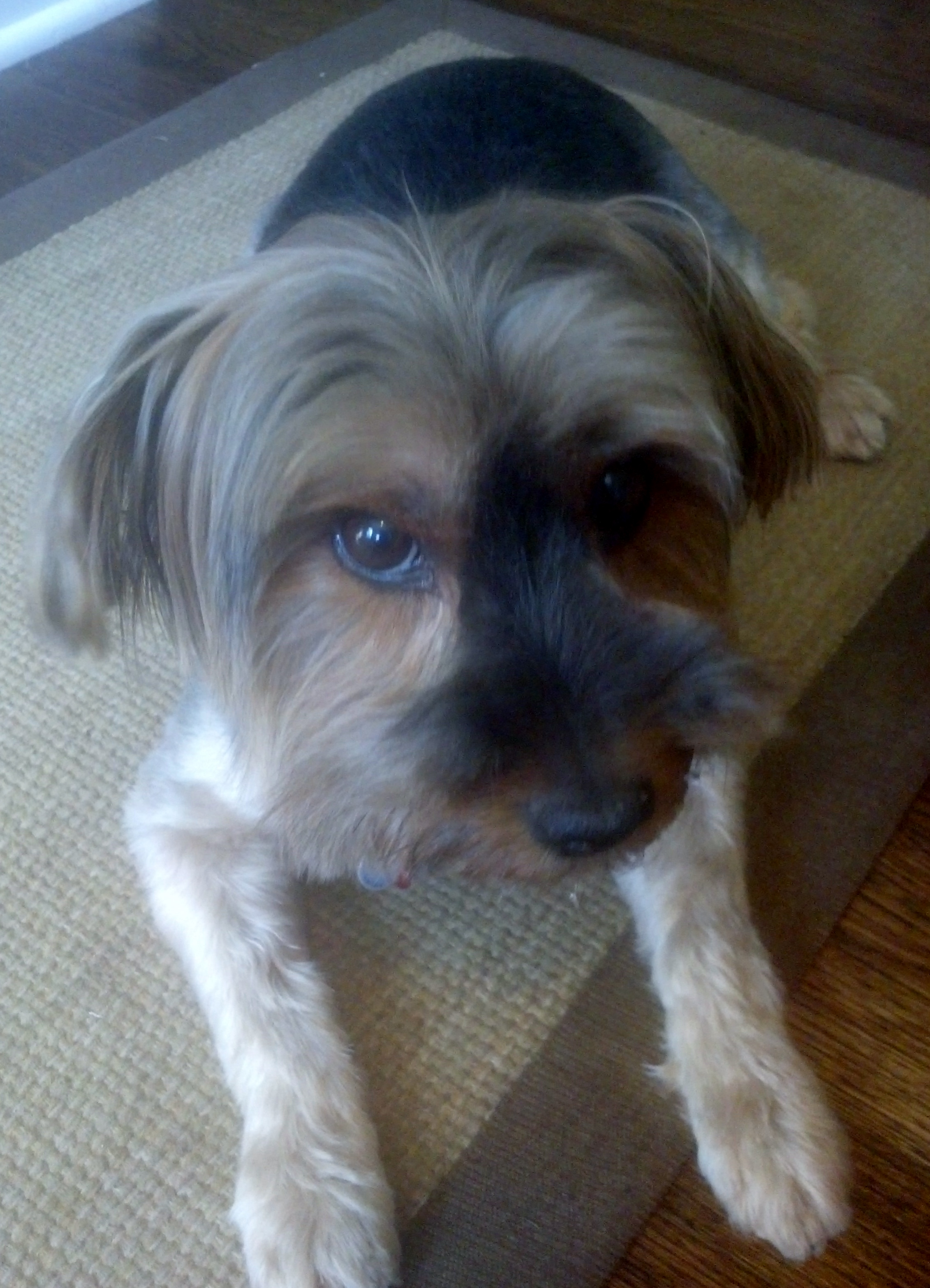
A Yorkshire Terrier with floppy ears

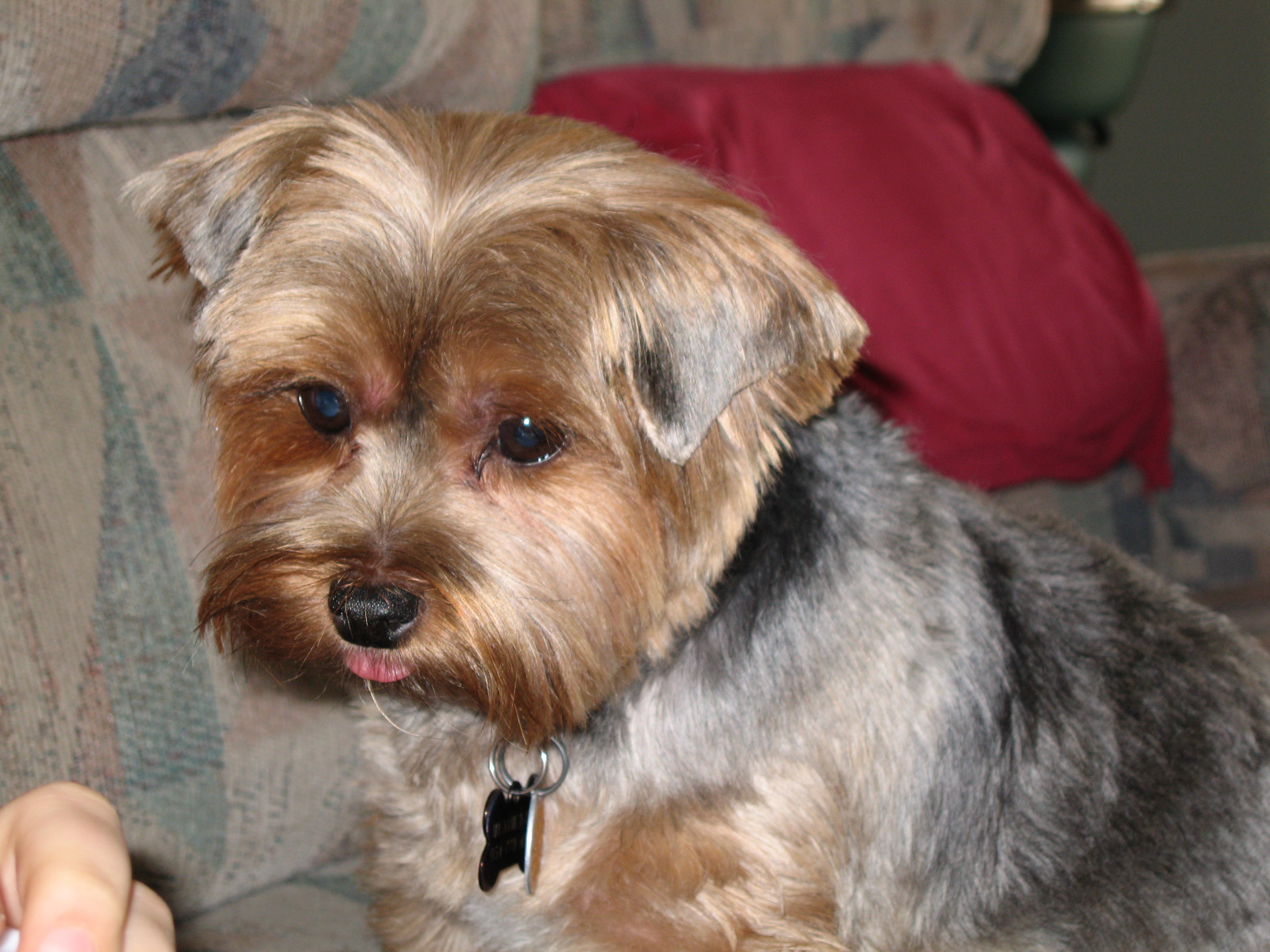
According to the standard, the ears must be small, V-shaped, carried erect and set not too far apart. If this is not the case, the dog should not be used for breeding.

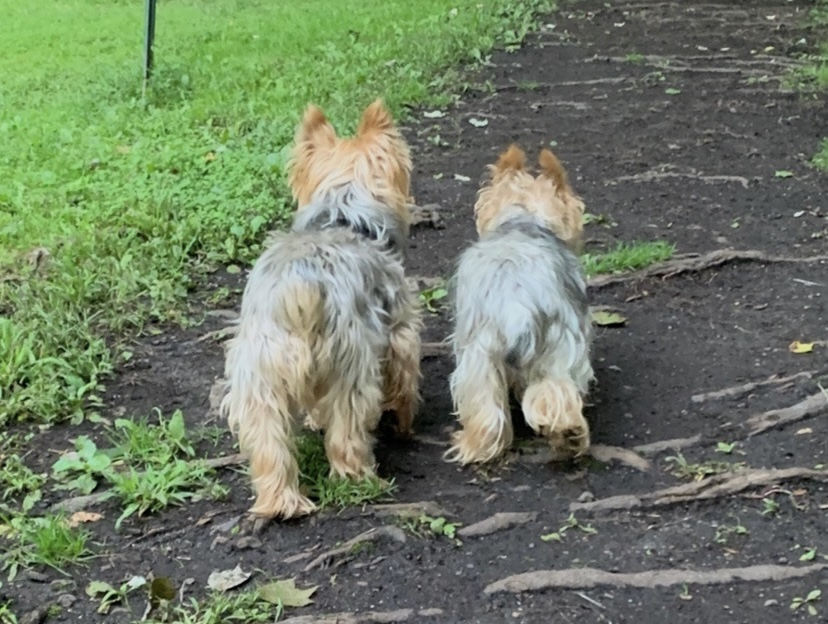
Two Yorkshire Terriers with short hair from the back

== Related breeds and derived breeds ==
The Yorkshire Terrier breed descends from larger but similar Scottish breeds, such as the Skye Terrier and the extinct Paisley Terrier. In its turn, other breeds have been created from the Yorkshire Terrier, such as the Silky Terrier and the Biewer Terrier.

The Biewer Terrier, bred from blue, white and gold puppies named Schneeflocke and Schneeflöckchen von Friedheck, owned by Mr. and Mrs. Biewer in Germany, was once considered a variation of the Yorkshire Terrier but has since been recognised as a separate breed by many kennel clubs, including the AKC.

== Notable Yorkshire Terriers ==
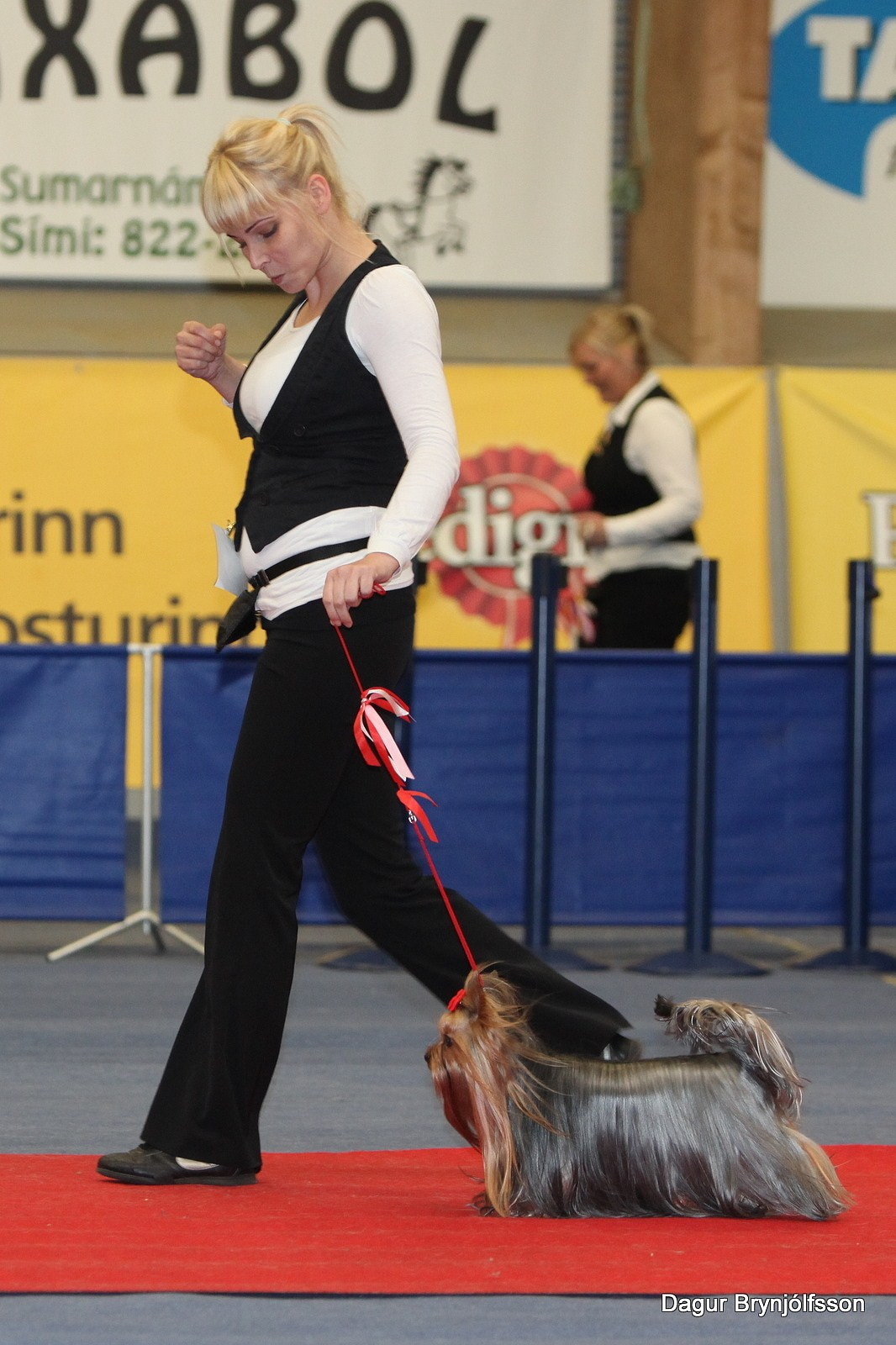
A Yorkshire terrier being exhibited at a show in October 2009

- In 1997, Champion Ozmilion Mystification became the first Yorkie to win Best in Show at Crufts, the world's largest annual dog show.
- Sylvia, a matchbox-sized Yorkshire Terrier owned by Arthur Marples of Blackburn, England, was the smallest dog in recorded history. The dog died in 1945 when she was two years old, at which point she stood 2 1/2 in (6.4 cm) tall at the shoulder, measured 3 1/2 in (8.9 cm) from nose tip to tail, and weighed 4 oz (110 g).
- Smoky, a war dog and hero of World War II, was owned by William Wynne of Cleveland, Ohio. Wynne adopted Smoky while he was serving with the 5th Air Force in the Pacific.
- Pasha, Tricia Nixon Cox's pet Yorkie, lived in the White House during Richard Nixon's presidency.

== Notes ==
1.The Japanese study reviewed cemetery data which is unlikely to have any records of still-births and altricial deaths whilst a veterinary clinic likely would have data on these.
