= Luxating patella =

- Other names: Trick knee, subluxation of patella, floating patella, floating kneecap
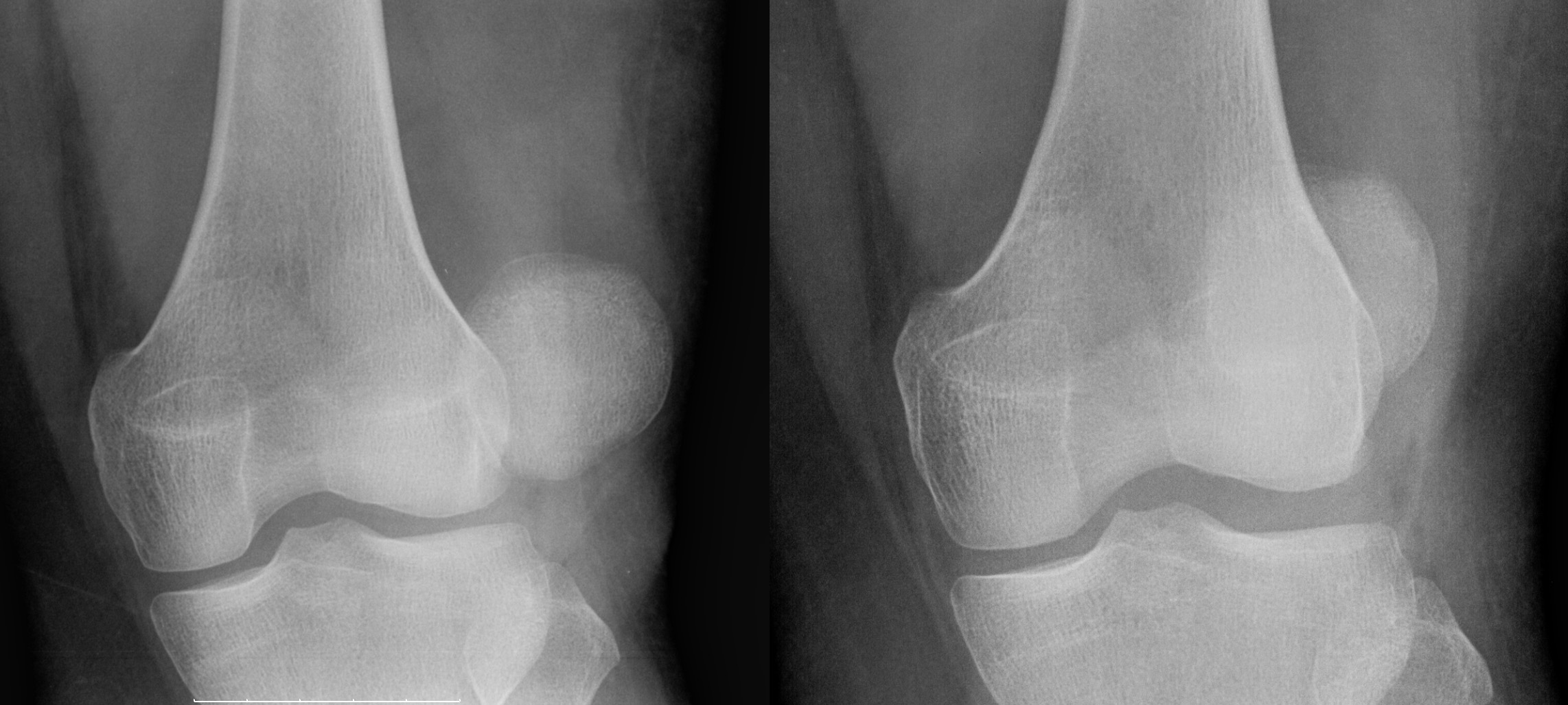
- Patellar luxation on radiograph: Left before, right after reduction; after reduction, the patella is still displaced.
- Specialty: Orthopedics

A luxating patella, sometimes called a trick knee, is a condition in which the patella, or kneecap, dislocates or moves out of its normal location. It can be associated with damage to the anterior cruciate ligament.

Patellar luxation is a common condition in dogs, particularly small and miniature breeds. The condition usually becomes evident between the ages of 4 and 6 months. It can occur in cats as well, especially domestic short-haired cats.

There have been several reports of patellar luxation in other species such as miniature pigs, alpacas, llamas, cattle, and goats.

== Causes ==
Rarely, it can be caused by some form of blunt trauma, but most frequently, it is a developmental, congenital defect. In congenital cases, it is frequently bilateral. The condition can also be inherited through genetics. This can also be caused by obesity.

== Diagnosis ==
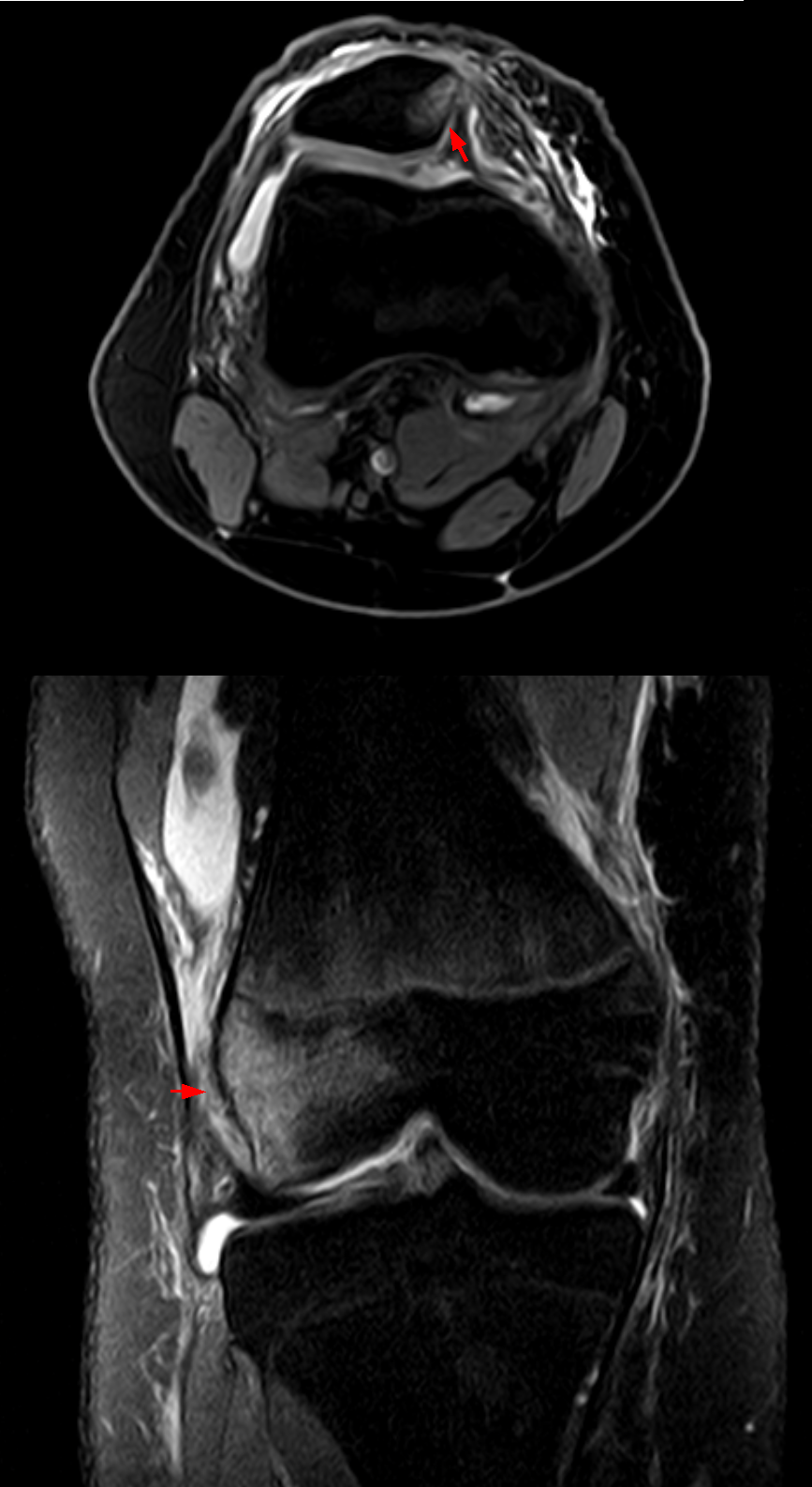
MRI after luxation of the right patella: A bone bruise is at the medial surface of the patella (axial image) and in the corresponding surface of the lateral condyle of the femur (coronal). The medial retinaculum of the patella is at least partially disrupted.

Diagnosis is made through palpation of the knee, to see whether it slips inside the joint more than would normally be expected. Often, a dog owner might be told that his or her pet has "loose knee", but this is not a medical term, and it is not correct to use it interchangeably with luxating patella.

Luxating patella cannot be present without the knee being loose, but a loose knee is not necessarily slipping out of the joint. Even with luxating patella, symptoms such as intermittent limping in the rear leg might be mild or absent. Physical examination and manual manipulation are the preferred methods for diagnosis. More extreme cases can result in severe lameness. Osteoarthritis typically develops secondarily.

The four recognized diagnostic grades of patellar luxation include, in order of severity:

=== Grade I ===
- Grade I - the patella can be manually luxated but is reduced (returns to the normal position) when released.

=== Grade II ===
- Grade II - the patella can be manually luxated or it can spontaneously luxate with flexion of the stifle joint. The patella remains luxated until it is manually reduced or when the animal extends the joint and derotates the tibia in the opposite direction of luxation.

=== Grade III ===
- Grade III - the patella remains luxated most of the time, but can be manually reduced with the stifle joint in extension. Flexion and extension of the stifle results again in luxation of the patella.

=== Grade IV ===
- Grade IV - the patella is permanently luxated and cannot be manually repositioned, with up to 90° of rotation of the proximal tibial plateau. The femoral trochlear groove is shallow or absent, with displacement of the quadriceps muscle group in the direction of luxation.

== Treatment ==
Grades II, III, and IV require surgery to correct, if the animal has difficulty walking. The surgery required is governed by the type of abnormality present, but often involves a sulcoplasty, a deepening of the trochlear sulcus where the patella sits, a realignment of the attachment of the patella tendon on the tibia, and tightening or releasing of the capsule on either side of the patella, according to which side the patella is slipping. Some grade IV conditions may require more involved surgery to realign the femur and/or tibia.

A therapeutic dosage of glucosamine can be used as a preliminary treatment to strengthen ligaments and the surrounding tissues of the joint and can delay or prevent surgery.

Additional help can be given with the use of pet ramps, stairs, or steps. These can help the animal travel from one place to another, especially up and down, without adding any pain or damage to the patella.

== In animal breeds ==
Most cases of patellar luxation are medial, and this is frequently a congenital problem in toy- and miniature-breed dogs. Breeds showing a predisposition for medial patellar luxation include miniature and toy Poodles, Maltese, Jack Russell Terriers, Yorkshire Terriers, Pomeranians, Pekingese, Patterdale Terriers, Chihuahuas, Cavalier King Charles Spaniels, Papillons, Boston Terriers, Plummer Terriers and Teddy Roosevelt Terriers. Large-breed dogs are also affected, and the Labrador retriever seems particularly predisposed.

Patellar luxation is less common in cats than in dogs. Predisposed breeds include the Devon Rex and the Abyssinian. Although the specific cause of patellar luxation is unknown in these cases, a defect in hind limb conformation is generally agreed to be the underlying cause.
