= Inbreeding =

Reproduction by closely related organisms

The passage of homozygous alleles through an inbred pedigree

Inbreeding is the production of offspring from the mating or breeding of individuals or organisms that are closely related genetically. By analogy, the term is used in human reproduction, but more commonly refers to the genetic disorders and other consequences that may arise from expression of deleterious recessive traits resulting from incestuous sexual relationships and consanguinity.

Inbreeding results in homozygosity which can increase the chances of offspring being affected by recessive traits. In extreme cases, this usually leads to at least temporarily decreased biological fitness of a population (called inbreeding depression), which is its ability to survive and reproduce. An individual who inherits such deleterious traits is colloquially referred to as inbred. The avoidance of expression of such deleterious recessive alleles caused by inbreeding, via inbreeding avoidance mechanisms, is the main selective reason for outcrossing. Crossbreeding between populations sometimes has positive effects on fitness-related traits, but also sometimes leads to negative effects known as outbreeding depression. However, increased homozygosity increases the probability of fixing beneficial alleles and also slightly decreases the probability of fixing deleterious alleles in a population. Inbreeding can result in purging of deleterious alleles from a population through purifying selection.

Inbreeding is a technique used in selective breeding. For example, in livestock breeding, breeders may use inbreeding when trying to establish a new and desirable trait in the stock and for producing distinct families within a breed, but will need to watch for undesirable characteristics in offspring, which can then be eliminated through further selective breeding or culling. Inbreeding also helps to ascertain the type of gene action affecting a trait. Inbreeding is also used to reveal deleterious recessive alleles, which can then be eliminated through selective breeding or through culling. In plant breeding, inbred lines are used as stocks for the creation of hybrid lines to make use of the effects of heterosis. Inbreeding in plants also occurs naturally in the form of self-pollination.

Inbreeding can significantly influence gene expression which can prevent inbreeding depression.

== Overview ==
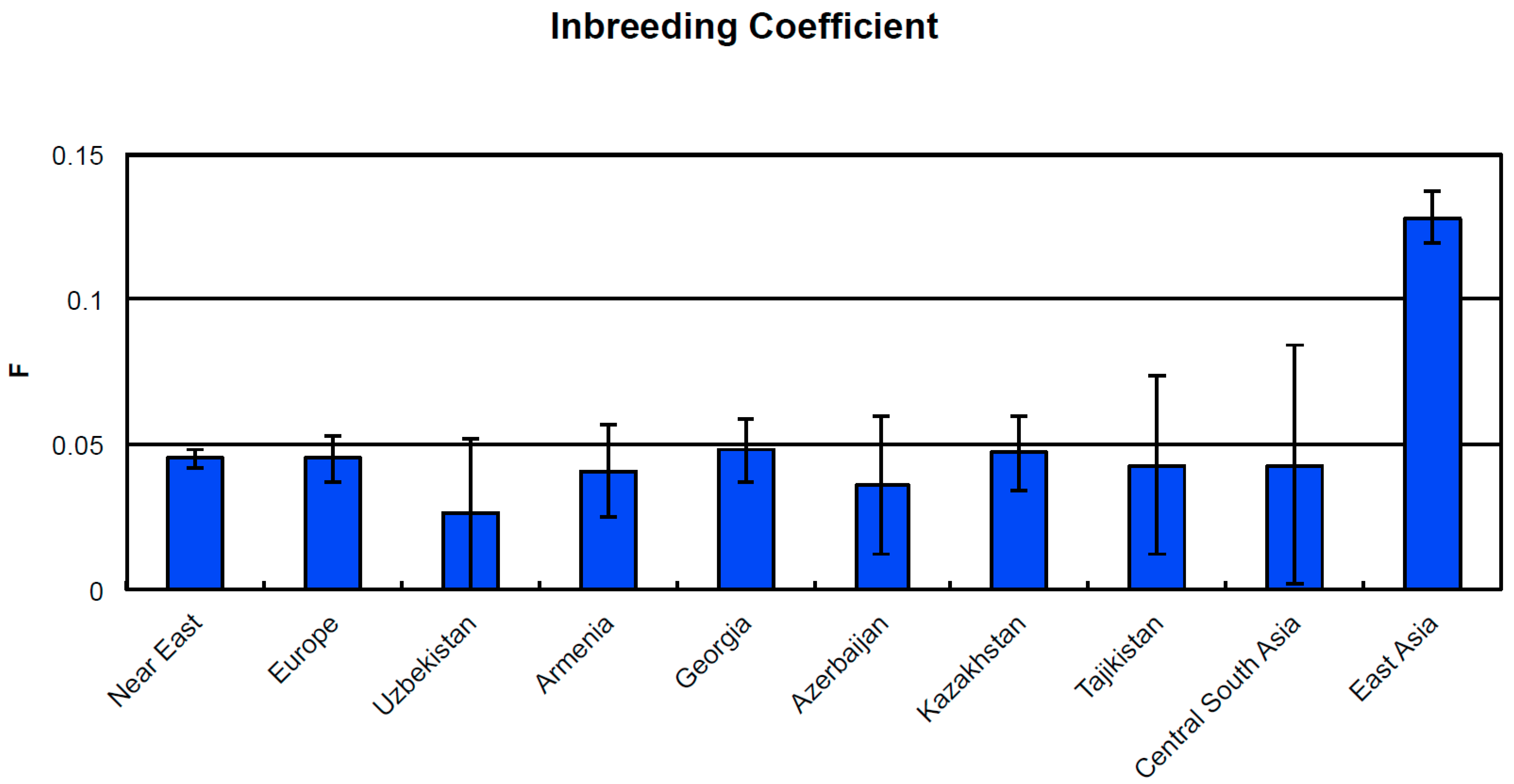
Inbreeding coefficients of various populations in Europe and Asia

Offspring of biologically related persons are subject to the possible effects of inbreeding, such as congenital birth defects. The chances of such disorders are increased when the biological parents are more closely related. This is because such pairings have a 25% probability of producing homozygous recessive zygotes, resulting in offspring with two recessive alleles, which can produce disorders when these alleles are deleterious. Because most recessive alleles are rare in populations, it is unlikely that two unrelated partners will both be carriers of the same deleterious allele; however, because close relatives share a large fraction of their alleles, the probability that any such deleterious allele is inherited from the common ancestor through both parents is increased dramatically. For each homozygous recessive individual formed there is an equal chance of producing a homozygous dominant individual — one completely devoid of the harmful allele.

Contrary to common belief, inbreeding does not in itself alter allele frequencies, but rather increases the relative proportion of homozygotes to heterozygotes; however, because the increased proportion of deleterious homozygotes exposes the allele to natural selection, in the long run its frequency decreases more rapidly in inbred populations. In the short term, incestuous reproduction is expected to increase the number of spontaneous abortions of zygotes, perinatal deaths, and children born with birth defects. The advantages of inbreeding may be the result of a tendency to preserve the structures of alleles interacting at different loci that have been adapted together by a common selective history.

Malformations or harmful traits can stay within a population due to a high homozygosity rate, and this will cause a population to become fixed for certain traits, like having too many bones in an area, like the vertebral column of wolves on Isle Royale, Michigan. Or, having cranial abnormalities, such as in Northern elephant seals, where their cranial bone length in the lower mandibular tooth row has changed. Having a high homozygosity rate is problematic for a population because it will unmask recessive deleterious alleles generated by mutations, reduce heterozygote advantage, and it is detrimental to the survival of small, endangered animal populations. When deleterious recessive alleles are unmasked due to the increased homozygosity generated by inbreeding, this can cause inbreeding depression.

There may also be other deleterious effects besides those caused by recessive diseases. For example, similar immune systems may be more vulnerable to infectious diseases (see Major histocompatibility complex and sexual selection).

Inbreeding history of the population should also be considered when discussing the variation in the severity of inbreeding depression between and within species. With persistent inbreeding, there is evidence that shows that inbreeding depression becomes less severe. This is associated with the unmasking and elimination of severely deleterious recessive alleles. However, inbreeding depression is not a temporary phenomenon because this elimination of deleterious recessive alleles will never be complete. Eliminating slightly deleterious mutations through inbreeding under moderate selection is not as effective. Fixation of alleles most likely occurs through Muller's ratchet, when an asexual population's genome accumulates deleterious mutations that are irreversible.

Despite all its disadvantages, inbreeding can also have a variety of advantages, such as ensuring a child produced from the mating contains, and will pass on, a higher percentage of its mother/father's genetics, reducing the recombination load, and allowing the expression of recessive advantageous phenotypes. Some species with a haplodiploidy mating system depend on the ability to produce sons to mate with as a means of ensuring a mate can be found if no other male is available. It has been proposed that under circumstances when the advantages of inbreeding outweigh the disadvantages, preferential breeding within small groups could be promoted, potentially leading to speciation.

== Genetic disorders ==
Animation of uniparental isodisomy

Autosomal recessive disorders occur in individuals who have two copies of an allele for a particular recessive genetic mutation. Except in certain rare circumstances, such as new mutations or uniparental disomy, both parents of an individual with such a disorder will be carriers of the gene. These carriers do not display any signs of the mutation and may be unaware that they carry the mutated gene. Since relatives share a higher proportion of their genes than do unrelated people, it is more likely that related parents will both be carriers of the same recessive allele, and therefore their children are at a higher risk of inheriting an autosomal recessive genetic disorder. The extent to which the risk increases depends on the degree of genetic relationship between the parents; the risk is greater when the parents are close relatives and lower for relationships between more distant relatives, such as second cousins, though still greater than for the general population.

Children of parent-child or sibling-sibling unions are at an increased risk compared to cousin-cousin unions. Inbreeding may result in a greater than expected phenotypic expression of deleterious recessive alleles within a population. As a result, first-generation inbred individuals are more likely to show physical and health defects, including:

- Lower intelligence quotient levels and higher incidence rates of being affected by an intellectual disability
- Reduced fertility both in litter size and sperm viability
- Increased genetic disorders
- Fluctuating facial asymmetry
- Lower birth rate
- Higher infant mortality and child mortality
- Smaller adult size
- Loss of immune system function
- Increased cardiovascular risks

The isolation of a small population for a period of time can lead to inbreeding within that population, resulting in increased genetic relatedness between breeding individuals. Inbreeding depression can also occur in a large population if individuals tend to mate with their relatives, instead of mating randomly.

Due to higher perinatal mortality and child mortality rates, some individuals in the first generation of inbreeding will not live on to reproduce. Over time, with isolation, such as a population bottleneck caused by purposeful (assortative) breeding or natural environmental factors, the deleterious inherited traits are culled.

Island species are often very inbred, as their isolation from the larger group on a mainland allows natural selection to work on their population. This type of isolation may result in the formation of race or even speciation, as the inbreeding first removes many deleterious genes, and permits the expression of genes that allow a population to adapt to an ecosystem. As the adaptation becomes more pronounced, the new species or race radiates from its entrance into the new space, or dies out if it cannot adapt and, most importantly, reproduce.

The reduced genetic diversity, for example due to a bottleneck will unavoidably increase inbreeding for the entire population. This may mean that a species may not be able to adapt to changes in environmental conditions. Each individual will have similar immune systems, as immune systems are genetically based. When a species becomes endangered, the population may fall below a minimum whereby the forced interbreeding between the remaining animals will result in extinction.

Natural breedings include inbreeding by necessity, and most animals only migrate when necessary. In many cases, the closest available mate is a mother, sister, grandmother, father, brother, or grandfather. In all cases, the environment presents stresses to remove from the population those individuals who cannot survive because of illness.

There was an assumption that wild populations do not inbreed; this is not what is observed in some cases in the wild. However, in species such as horses, animals in wild or feral conditions often drive off the young of both sexes, thought to be a mechanism by which the species instinctively avoids some of the genetic consequences of inbreeding. In general, many mammal species, including humanity's closest primate relatives, avoid close inbreeding possibly due to the deleterious effects.

=== Examples ===
Although there are several examples of inbred populations of wild animals, the negative consequences of this inbreeding are poorly documented. In the South American sea lion, there was concern that recent population crashes would reduce genetic diversity. Historical analysis indicated that a population expansion from just two matrilineal lines was responsible for most of the individuals within the population. Even so, the diversity within the lines allowed great variation in the gene pool that may help to protect the South American sea lion from extinction.

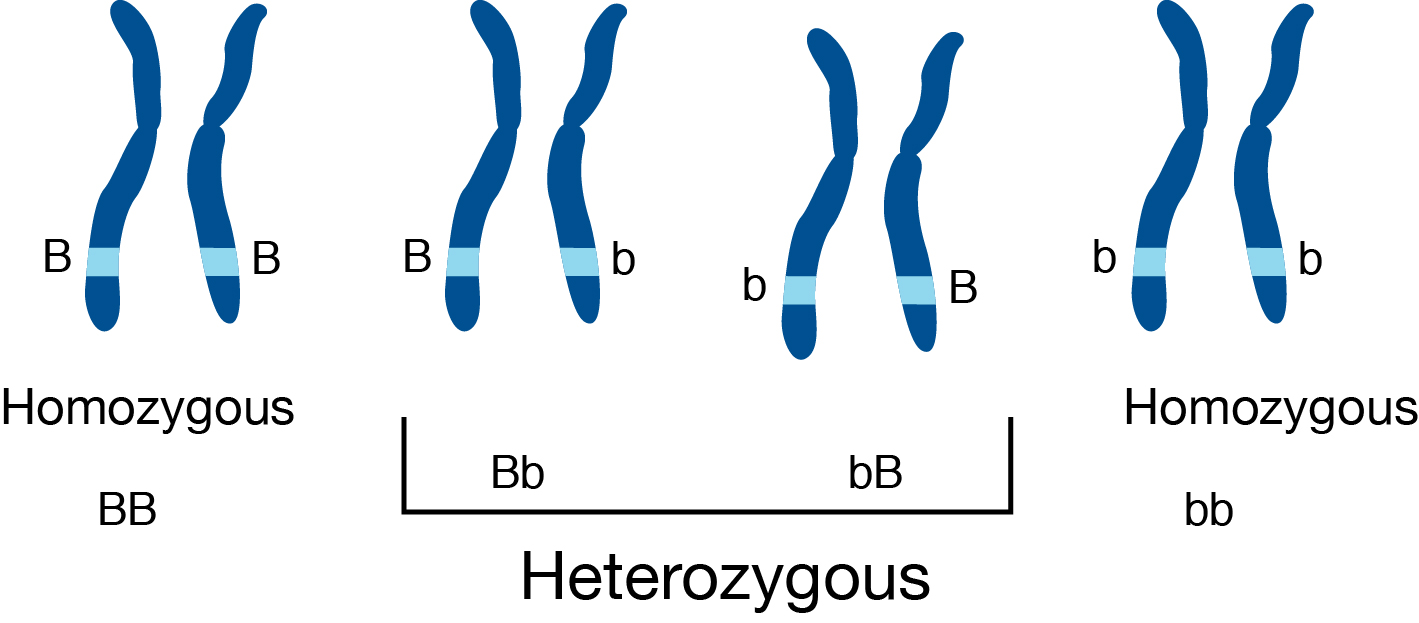
Heterozygous

In lions, prides are often followed by related males in bachelor groups. When the dominant male is killed or driven off by one of these bachelors, a father may be replaced by his son. There is no mechanism for preventing inbreeding or to ensure outcrossing. In the prides, most lionesses are related to one another. If there is more than one dominant male, the group of alpha males are usually related. Two lines are then being "line bred". Also, in some populations, such as the Crater lions, it is known that a population bottleneck has occurred. Researchers found far greater genetic heterozygosity than expected. In fact, predators are known for low genetic variance, along with most of the top portion of the trophic levels of an ecosystem. Additionally, the alpha males of two neighboring prides can be from the same litter; one brother may come to acquire leadership over another's pride, and subsequently mate with his 'nieces' or cousins. However, killing another male's cubs, upon the takeover, allows the new selected gene complement of the incoming alpha male to prevail over the previous male. There are genetic assays being scheduled for lions to determine their genetic diversity. The preliminary studies show results inconsistent with the outcrossing paradigm based on individual environments of the studied groups.

In Central California, sea otters were thought to have been driven to extinction due to over hunting, until a small colony was discovered in the Point Sur region in the 1930s. Since then, the population has grown and spread along the central Californian coast to around 2,000 individuals, a level that has remained stable for over a decade. Population growth is limited by the fact that all Californian sea otters are descended from the isolated colony, resulting in inbreeding.

Cheetahs are another example of inbreeding. Thousands of years ago, the cheetah went through a population bottleneck that reduced its population dramatically so the animals that are alive today are all related to one another. A consequence from inbreeding for this species has been high juvenile mortality, low fecundity, and poor breeding success.

In a study on an island population of song sparrows, individuals that were inbred showed significantly lower survival rates than outbred individuals during a severe winter weather related population crash. These studies show that inbreeding depression and ecological factors have an influence on survival.

The Florida panther population was reduced to about 30 animals, so inbreeding became a problem. Several females were imported from Texas and now the population is better off genetically.

== Measures ==
A measure of inbreeding of an individual A is the probability F(A) that both alleles in one locus are derived from the same allele in an ancestor. These two identical alleles that are both derived from a common ancestor are said to be identical by descent. This probability F(A) is called the "coefficient of inbreeding".

Another useful measure that describes the extent to which two individuals are related (say individuals A and B) is their coancestry coefficient f(A,B), which gives the probability that one randomly selected allele from A and another randomly selected allele from B are identical by descent. This is also denoted as the kinship coefficient between A and B.

A particular case is the self-coancestry of individual A with itself, f(A,A), which is the probability that taking one random allele from A and then, independently and with replacement, another random allele also from A, both are identical by descent. Since they can be identical by descent by sampling the same allele or by sampling both alleles that happen to be identical by descent, we have f(A,A) = 1/2 + F(A)/2.

Both the inbreeding and the coancestry coefficients can be defined for specific individuals or as average population values. They can be computed from genealogies or estimated from the population size and its breeding properties, but all methods assume no selection and are limited to neutral alleles.

There are several methods to compute this percentage. The two main ways are the path method and the tabular method.

Typical coancestries between relatives are as follows:

- Father/daughter or mother/son → 25% (1/4)
- Brother/sister → 25% (1/4)
- Grandfather/granddaughter or grandmother/grandson → 12.5% (1/8)
- Half-brother/half-sister, Double cousins → 12.5% (1/8)
- Uncle/niece or aunt/nephew → 12.5% (1/8)
- Great-grandfather/great-granddaughter or great-grandmother/great-grandson → 6.25% (1/16)
- Half-uncle/niece or half-aunt/nephew → 6.25% (1/16)
- First cousins → 6.25% (1/16)

== Animals ==
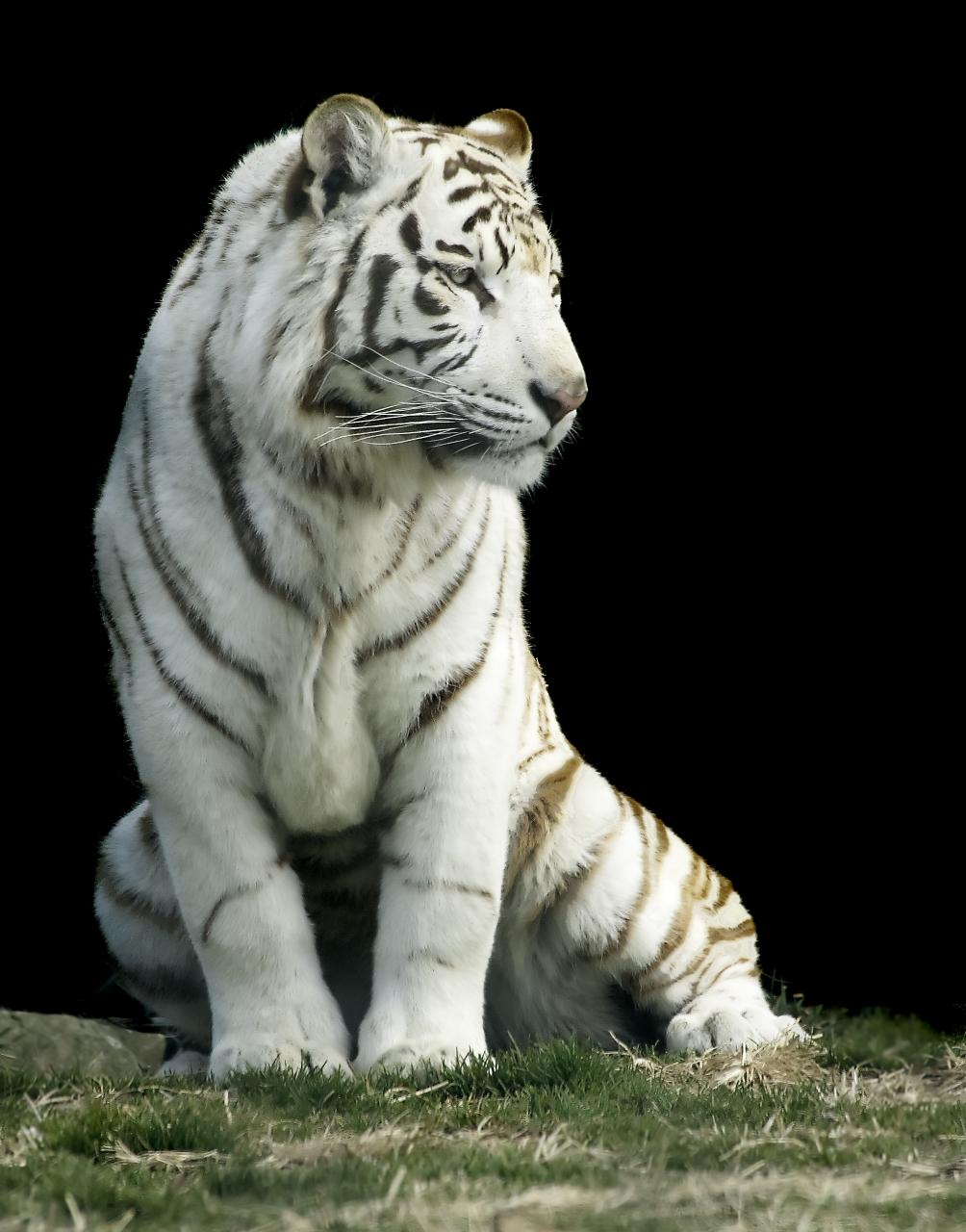
White tiger in Gunma Safari Park

=== Wild animals ===
- Banded mongoose females regularly mate with their fathers and brothers.
- Bed bugs: North Carolina State University found that bedbugs, in contrast to most other insects, tolerate incest and are able to genetically withstand the effects of inbreeding quite well.
- Common fruit fly females prefer to mate with their own brothers over unrelated males.
- Cottony cushion scales: 'It turns out that females in these hermaphrodite insects are not really fertilizing their eggs themselves, but instead are having this done by a parasitic tissue that infects them at birth,' says Laura Ross of Oxford University's Department of Zoology. 'It seems that this infectious tissue derives from left-over sperm from their father, who has found a sneaky way of having more children by mating with his daughters.'
- Adactylidium: The single male offspring mite mates with all the daughters when they are still in the mother. The females, now impregnated, cut holes in their mother's body so that they can emerge. The male emerges as well, but does not look for food or new mates, and dies after a few hours. The females die at the age of 4 days, when their own offspring eat them alive from the inside.

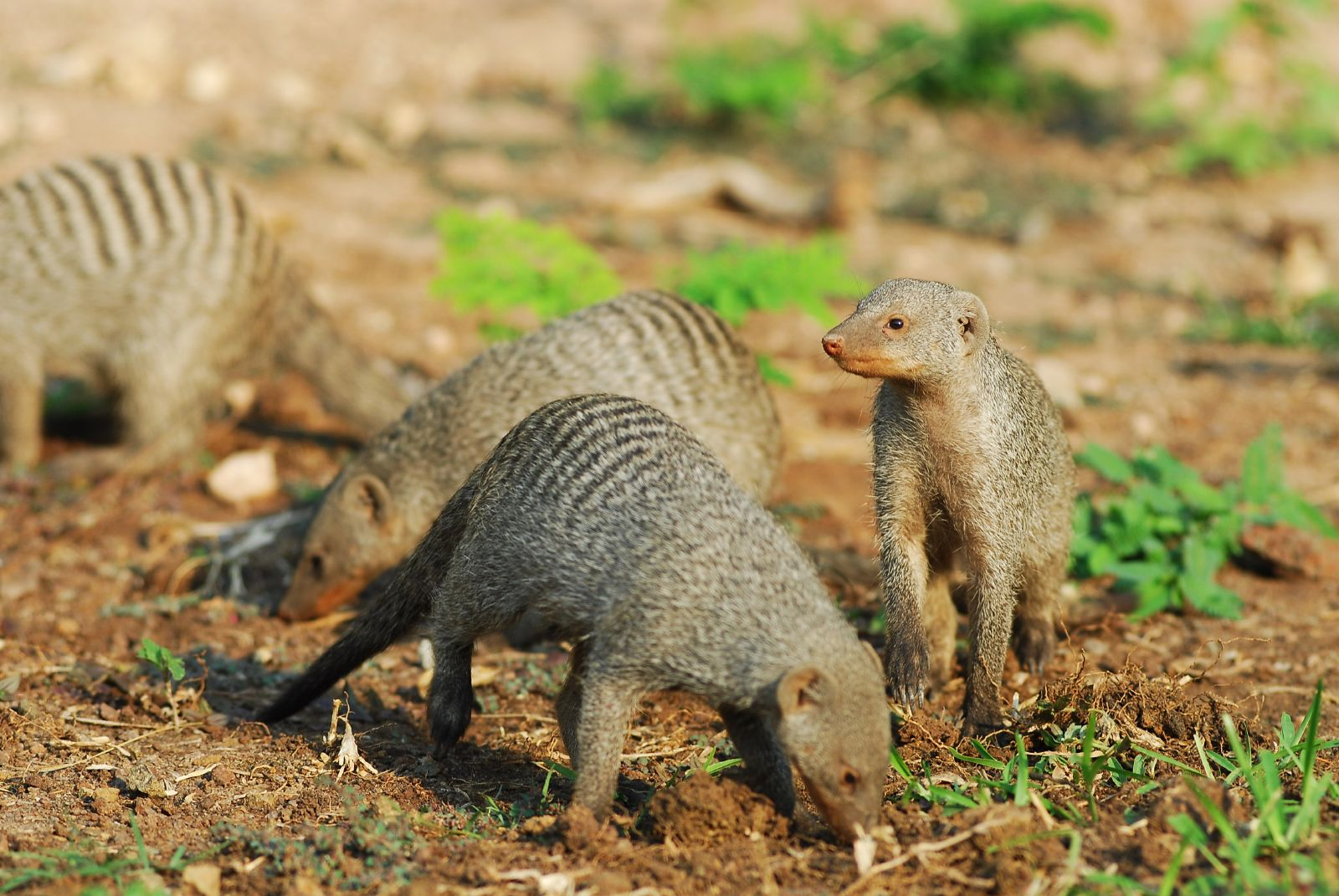
Banded mongoose females regularly mate with their fathers and brothers.

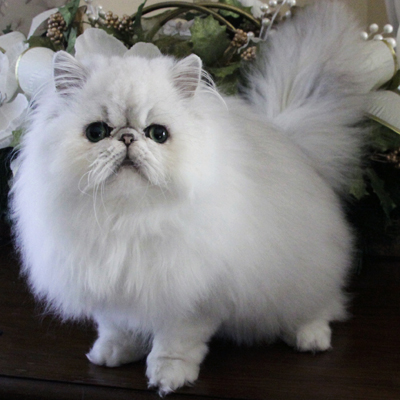
Hereditary polycystic kidney disease is prevalent in the Persian cat breed, affecting almost half the population in some countries.

=== Domestic animals ===
An intensive form of linebreeding where an individual S is mated to his daughter D1, granddaughter D2 and so on, in order to maximize the percentage of S's genes in the offspring. 87.5% of D3's genes would come from S, while D4 would receive 93.75% of their genes from S.

Breeding in domestic animals is primarily selective breeding. Without the sorting of individuals by trait, a breed could not be established, nor could poor genetic material be removed. Homozygosity is the case where similar or identical alleles combine to express a trait that is not otherwise expressed (recessiveness). Inbreeding exposes recessive alleles through increasing homozygosity.

Breeders must avoid breeding from individuals that demonstrate either homozygosity or heterozygosity for disease causing alleles. The goal of preventing the transfer of deleterious alleles may be achieved by reproductive isolation, sterilization, or, in the extreme case, culling. Culling is not strictly necessary if genetics is the only issue in small/domestic animals: sterilization/fertility control is effective and often preferable. For large agricultural animals, like cattle, culling is routinely used as the primary economic method to remove less desirable animals rather than sterilize them.

The issue of casual breeders who inbreed irresponsibly is discussed in the following quotation on cattle:

Meanwhile, milk production per cow per lactation increased from 17,444 to 25,013 lb (7,912 to 11,346 kg) from 1978 to 1998 for the Holstein breed. Mean breeding values for milk of Holstein cows increased by 4,829 lb (2,190 kg) during this period. High producing cows are increasingly difficult to breed and are subject to higher health costs than cows of lower genetic merit for production. (Cassell, 2001)

...

Intensive selection for higher yield has increased relationships among animals within breed and increased the rate of casual inbreeding. Many of the traits that affect profitability in crosses of modern dairy breeds have not been studied in designed experiments. Indeed, all crossbreeding research involving North American breeds and strains is very dated (McAllister, 2001) if it exists at all.

— S1008: Genetic Selection and Crossbreeding to Enhance Reproduction and Survival of Dairy Cattle (S-284)

As a result of long-term cooperation between USDA and dairy farmers which led to a revolution in dairy cattle productivity, the United States has since 1992 been the world's largest supplier of dairy bull semen. However, US genomic technology has resulted in the US dairy cattle population becoming "the most inbred it's ever been" and the rate of increase in US national milk yield has tapered off. Efforts are now being made to identify desirable genes in cattle breeds not yet optimized by US dairy breeders in order to apply hybrid vigor to the US dairy cattle population and thus propel US dairy technology to even higher levels of productivity.

The BBC produced two documentaries on dog inbreeding titled Pedigree Dogs Exposed and Pedigree Dogs Exposed: Three Years On that document the negative health consequences of excessive inbreeding.

==== Linebreeding ====
Linebreeding is a form of inbreeding in which an animal is bred to its descendants, or, further down the line, when the animals being bred together are not closely related but share a common ancestor. Often this animal is a male that was mated to multiple females, due to the length of gestation. This method can be used to increase a particular animal's contribution to the gene pool and preserve healthy and desirable traits in the population.

While linebreeding is less likely to cause problems in the first generation than inbreeding, over time, linebreeding can reduce the genetic diversity of a population and cause an increased prevalence of genetic disorders and inbreeding depression.

==== Outcrossing ====
Outcrossing is where two unrelated individuals are crossed to produce progeny. In outcrossing, unless there is verifiable genetic information, one may find that all individuals are distantly related to an ancient progenitor. If the trait carries throughout a population, all individuals can have this trait. This is called the founder effect. In the well established breeds, that are commonly bred, a large gene pool is present. For example, in 2004, over 18,000 Persian cats were registered. A possibility exists for a complete outcross, if no barriers exist between the individuals to breed. However, it is not always the case, and a form of distant linebreeding occurs. Again it is up to the assortative breeder to know what sort of traits, both positive and negative, exist within the diversity of one breeding. This diversity of genetic expression, within even close relatives, increases the variability and diversity of viable stock.

=== Laboratory animals ===
Systematic inbreeding and maintenance of inbred strains of laboratory mice and rats is of great importance for biomedical research. The inbreeding guarantees a consistent and uniform animal model for experimental purposes and enables genetic studies in congenic and knock-out animals. In order to achieve a mouse strain that is considered inbred, a minimum of 20 sequential generations of sibling matings must occur. With each successive generation of breeding, homozygosity in the entire genome increases, eliminating heterozygous loci. With 20 generations of sibling matings, homozygosity is occurring at roughly 98.7% of all loci in the genome, allowing for these offspring to serve as animal models for genetic studies. The use of inbred strains is also important for genetic studies in animal models, for example to distinguish genetic from environmental effects. The mice that are inbred typically show considerably lower survival rates.

== Humans ==
Consanguineous marriages (second-degree cousins or closer) in the world, in percentage (%).

=== Effects ===
Inbreeding increases homozygosity, which can increase the chances of the expression of deleterious or beneficial recessive alleles and therefore has the potential to either decrease or increase the fitness of the offspring. Depending on the rate of inbreeding, natural selection may still be able to eliminate deleterious alleles. With continuous inbreeding, genetic variation is lost and homozygosity is increased, enabling the expression of recessive deleterious alleles in homozygotes. The coefficient of inbreeding, or the degree of inbreeding in an individual, is an estimate of the percent of homozygous alleles in the overall genome. The more biologically related the parents are, the greater the coefficient of inbreeding, since their genomes have many similarities already. This overall homozygosity becomes an issue when there are deleterious recessive alleles in the gene pool of the family. By pairing chromosomes of similar genomes, the chance for these recessive alleles to pair and become homozygous greatly increases, leading to offspring with autosomal recessive disorders. However, these deleterious effects are common for very close relatives but not for those related on the 3rd cousin or greater level, who exhibit increased fitness.

Inbreeding is especially problematic in small populations where the genetic variation is already limited. By inbreeding, individuals are further decreasing genetic variation by increasing homozygosity in the genomes of their offspring. Thus, the likelihood of deleterious recessive alleles to pair is significantly higher in a small inbreeding population than in a larger inbreeding population.

The fitness consequences of consanguineous mating have been studied since their scientific recognition by Charles Darwin in 1839. Some of the most harmful effects known from such breeding includes its effects on the mortality rate as well as on the general health of the offspring. Since the 1960s, there have been many studies to support such debilitating effects on the human organism. Specifically, inbreeding has been found to decrease fertility as a direct result of increasing homozygosity of deleterious recessive alleles. Fetuses produced by inbreeding also face a greater risk of spontaneous abortions due to inherent complications in development. Among mothers who experience stillbirths and early infant deaths, those that are inbreeding have a significantly higher chance of reaching repeated results with future offspring. Additionally, consanguineous parents possess a high risk of premature birth and producing underweight and undersized infants. Viable inbred offspring are also likely to be inflicted with physical deformities and genetically inherited diseases. Studies have confirmed an increase in several genetic disorders due to inbreeding such as blindness, hearing loss, neonatal diabetes, limb malformations, disorders of sex development, and several others. Moreover, there is an increased risk for congenital heart disease depending on the inbreeding coefficient of the offspring, with significant risk when F = 0.125 or higher.

=== Prevalence ===
The general negative outlook and eschewal of inbreeding that is prevalent in the Western world today has roots from over 2000 years ago. Specifically, written documents such as the Bible illustrate that there have been laws and social customs that have called for the abstention from inbreeding. Along with cultural taboos, parental education and awareness of inbreeding consequences have played large roles in minimizing inbreeding frequencies in areas like Europe. That being so, there are less urbanized and less populated regions across the world that have shown continuity in the practice of inbreeding.

The continuity of inbreeding is often either by choice or unavoidably due to the limitations of the geographical area. When by choice, the rate of consanguinity is highly dependent on religion and culture. In the Western world, some Anabaptist groups are highly inbred because they originate from small founder populations that have bred as a closed population.

Of the practicing regions, Middle Eastern and northern African nations show the greatest frequencies of consanguinity.

Among these populations with high levels of inbreeding, researchers have found several disorders prevalent among inbred offspring. In Lebanon, Saudi Arabia, Egypt, and Israel, the offspring of consanguineous relationships have an increased risk of congenital malformations, congenital heart defects, congenital hydrocephalus and neural tube defects. Furthermore, among inbred children in Palestine and Lebanon, there is a positive association between consanguinity and reported cleft lip/palate cases. Historically, populations of Qatar have engaged in consanguineous relationships of all kinds, leading to high risk of inheriting genetic diseases. As of 2014, around 5% of the Qatari population suffered from hereditary hearing loss; most were descendants of a consanguineous relationship. In 2017-2019, congenital anomalies due to inbreeding was the most common cause of death of babies belonging to the Pakistani and Bangladeshi ethnic groups in England and Wales.

=== Royalty and nobility ===
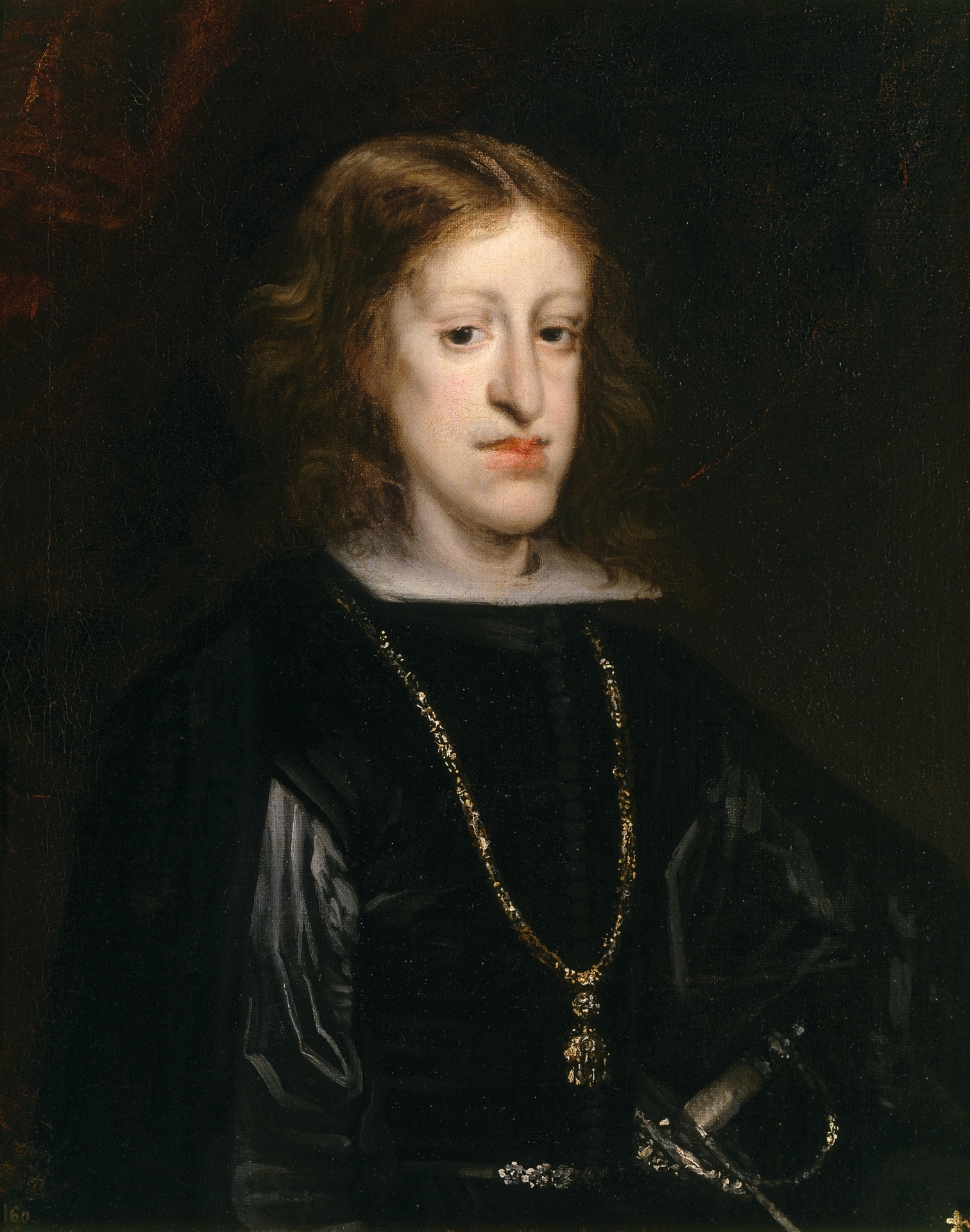
Charles II of Spain, a member of the famously inbred House of Habsburg with a pronounced lower "Habsburg jaw".

Inter-nobility marriage was used as a method of forming political alliances among elites. These ties were often sealed only upon the birth of progeny within the arranged marriage. Thus marriage was seen as a union of lines of nobility and not as a contract between individuals.

Royal intermarriage was often practiced among European royal families, usually for interests of state. Over time, due to the relatively limited number of potential consorts, the gene pool of many ruling families grew progressively smaller, until all European royalty was related. This also resulted in many being descended from a certain person through many lines of descent, such as the numerous European royalty and nobility descended from the British Queen Victoria or King Christian IX of Denmark. The House of Habsburg was known for its intermarriages; the Habsburg jaw often cited as an ill-effect. The closely related houses of Habsburg, Bourbon, Braganza and Wittelsbach also frequently engaged in first-cousin unions as well as the occasional double-cousin and uncle–niece marriages.

In ancient Egypt, royal women were believed to carry the bloodlines and so it was advantageous for a pharaoh to marry his sister or half-sister; in such cases a special combination between endogamy and polygamy is found. Normally, the old ruler's eldest son and daughter (who could be either siblings or half-siblings) became the new rulers. All rulers of the Ptolemaic dynasty uninterruptedly from Ptolemy IV (Ptolemy II married his sister but had no issue) were married to their brothers and sisters, so as to keep the Ptolemaic blood "pure" and to strengthen the line of succession. King Tutankhamun's mother is reported to have been the full sister to his father; Cleopatra VII (also called Cleopatra VI) and Ptolemy XIII, who married and became co-rulers of ancient Egypt following their father's death, are the most widely known example.

== See also ==
- Álvarez incest case
- Coefficient of relationship
- Consanguinity
- Cousin marriage
- Cousin marriage in the Middle East
- Evolution of sexual reproduction
- Exogamy
- Founder effect
- F-statistics
- Fritzl case
- Genetic diversity
- Genetic purging
- Genetic sexual attraction
- Heterozygote advantage
- Identical ancestors point
- Inbreeding depression
- Inbreeding in fish
- Incest
- Incest taboo
- Insular dwarfism
- Intellectual inbreeding
- Legality of incest
- List of coupled cousins
- Mahram
- Outbreeding depression
- Outcrossing
- Proximity of blood
- Prohibited degree of kinship
- Selective breeding
- Self-incompatibility in plants (the way that some plants avoid inbreeding)
