= Pedigree Dogs Exposed: Three Years On =

- Country of origin: United Kingdom

Production
- Producer: Jemima Harrison
- Running time: 60 minutes
- Production company: Passionate Productions

Original release
- Network: BBC Four
- Release: 27 February 2012

Pedigree Dogs Exposed: Three Years On is a 2012 follow-up to the 2008 BBC One documentary, Pedigree Dogs Exposed. It covers both positive changes made since the original film and areas of continuing concern. The programme aired on 27 February 2012 in the United Kingdom.

The documentary concludes that it is time to call a halt to suffering created by dog breeders. It suggests that the Kennel Club tolerates the breeding of dogs that cannot run, breathe, or see freely, due to a conflict of interest in its commitments to breeders and to dogs. It also calls on dog fanciers to stop being consumers of "freak-show" appearance, the driving factor in developing dogs to physical extremes. The Kennel Club refused to participate in the production.

== Content ==
=== Recap of Pedigree Dogs Exposed and what followed ===
- Three independent inquiries into dog breeding and the setting up of a new advisory council for dog breeding chaired by Professor Shelia Crispin.
- Crispin notes that some reputable breeders felt they were being criticized for the faults of a few, but the programme stirred many of them into action on things that have been worrying them for years. She considers the programme to have done more good than harm.
- The veterinary profession sees the urgency of the situation and that they have a key role to play.
- The Kennel Club of the United Kingdom (KC) states that the programme was highly one-sided and that there are already many things that they are doing to improve the situation. The Kennel Club also states that if people looked into the reality of it, they would find that there was not much to worry about.

==== Core claims of PDE ====
There is a diminishing gene pool from which dogs are bred, so the viability of entire breeds are at risk. The Kennel Club admitted it could stop registering dogs that are closely inbred, but rejected the idea that there is scientific evidence that preventing inbreeding will produce better, healthier, longer-lived pets.

Breeding for looks and success in the show ring has led to some dogs being burdened by disabling physical exaggerations. Showing has nothing to do with health and temperament. Some puppies that do not meet breed standards are culled.

The Kennel Club's new code of ethics, produced three weeks after the programme, forbids culling of healthy puppies. They reviewed every breed standard to remove clauses that could lead to physical extremes two months after the programme aired. Later they banned mother to son, father to daughter and brother to sister matings.

==== Structure of the dog world ====
A fundamental problem that inhibits progress is the way the dog world is run and regulated. The stated goal of the Kennel Club is "to promote in every way the general improvement of dogs"; the main function of the Kennel Club is as a registry that records the lineage of purebred dogs, and to run dog shows. It is breeders who run the breed clubs, that judge each other's dogs in the show ring and that sit on rule making committees in the Kennel Club. Without regulatory bodies prioritizing animal welfare, progress has been slow or ineffective in this field.

==== Cavalier King Charles Spaniel ====
It was shown in PDE that Cavalier King Charles Spaniels suffer from syringomyelia (SM) and heart disease. Three weeks after the programme, the Cavalier Club expelled breed health representative Margaret Carter, voting 204 to 31, in a Special General Meeting for revealing the SM condition of a show dog in the first programme. The reason for this expulsion was that the club's code of ethics forbade anyone from saying anything detrimental about the breed, the club or breeders. Ms. Carter stated, "It was always said that talking about health ruins the breed, so as far as they were concerned I had ruined the breed". A club for pet owners of Cavaliers has since been set up.

The British Veterinary Association (BVA) and the Kennel Club recently launched MRI screening scheme for Syringomyelia (SM). Results will be published on the Kennel Club website to allow buyers to know if breeders are using scanned dogs. Some influential breeders do not want the results to be made public and refuse to support the scheme. The Kennel Club will not make the tests mandatory without the support of individual breed clubs.

Prof. Sir Patrick Bateson who headed the Independent Inquiry into Dog Breeding stated, "One has the impression that some of the breeders simply have their heads stuck in the sand...they are just not listening". He concluded that if they could not produce acceptably healthy dogs, they should stop breeding.

New research shows that up to 70% of six-year-old Cavaliers have SM. Not all show clinical signs, but their puppies can still be severely affected. Pet owner Carol Fowler, featured in PDE as a campaigner for Cavaliers' health, believes it is no longer ethically justifiable to breed Cavaliers.

=== Inbreeding and genetic diversity ===
==== Dalmatians ====
In January 2011, the Kennel Club registered a Dalmatian named Fiona, who had an English Pointer far back in its pedigree. Some breeders consider Fiona a mongrel. The Pointer was used to introduce a gene that was no longer present in Dalmatians back into the Dalmatian gene pool (see Dalmatian-Pointer Backcross Project). The gene gives the dog the ability to produce normal uric acid. No "pure-bred" Dalmatian has the normal uric acid gene and all can be affected by hyperuricemia. The high level of uric acid can cause stones in the urinary tract, which in turn can cause life-threatening blockages. Dalmatians have to be fed a special diet to prevent stones from forming. When breeder Julie Evans wanted to import Fiona into the UK to help introduce the healthy gene into the UK gene-pool, the British Dalmatian Club tried to stop her, calling it "inappropriate" and "irresponsible". The Kennel Club rejected these claims and registered Fiona, despite the club's objection. She went on to appear at the Crufts dog show. The breed club makes no mention of the option to breed dogs without the high uric acid genes on its website. Evans expressed her disappointment at the club's failure to reverse this decision.

==== Boxers ====
Breeders who want to push for change can be marginalized by the powerful breed club hierarchy and it can be difficult for individuals to make themselves heard when it is the action of people in charge of the breed club that are putting some dogs at risk. A Boxer pet owner had a dog diagnosed with a rare juvenile kidney disease. A short while later, another of her Boxers, a half-sibling to the first, was diagnosed with the same disease. The father of the two affected dogs is a champion dog from the kennel Glenauld Boxers called Gucci, who turned out to have sired other litters affected with the disease.

Breeder Sharon McCurdy, who had three of those litters and already lost one dog to the disease, contacted geneticist Bruce Cattanach for help. Cattanach is a Boxer breeder and has been the breed's genetics adviser for more than 30 years. Most cases of kidney disease are not inherited, but upon reviewing pedigree information of affected dogs, the disease seemed likely to be inherited in a recessive manner, meaning that puppies are at risk only if both parents carry the faulty gene. Close inbreeding increases the likelihood of recessive genes matching up. Cattanach quickly found more than 30 cases of the juvenile kidney disease diagnosed between 2007 and 2010, most are now dead and all closely related. The chance of the disease not being an inherited condition now seems remote. In almost half the cases, Gucci was either the puppies' father or grandfather. Because Gucci is a popular stud dog and had sired 894 puppies, the consequences will be worrying if he turns out to be the source of the gene.

Gucci is owned by top breeder, KC judge, and chair of the Boxer breed club Janice Mair, one of the most powerful people in the breed. Cattanach contacted Mair to inform her that Gucci might be carrying the harmful gene, hoping she would help with the problem, but she did not believe him. As he investigated further, Cattanach realized that the problem was not just confined to Gucci, but involved a larger family group. If Gucci had the harmful gene, it was likely inherited from one of Gucci's grandfathers, a champion coming from the top UK Boxer kennel Walkon Boxers, run by Walker and Yvonne Miller. All but two of the 30 cases had this dog's genes in their pedigree and other Walkon dogs have directly produced puppies with the disease.

For definitive proof, there was a need to develop a gene test. Blood samples were needed for this. When Cattanach presented his findings to the Boxer breed council in 2011 which included Walker Miller and Mair, he was met with virtual silence. In spite of that, the press statement issued shortly after by the breed council was very supportive of Cattanach in his efforts to find a genetic test and encouraged owners to donate blood for the research. It also advised breeders to avoid inbreeding to reduce the chance of doubling up on the harmful gene.

Cattanach states that genetic mutations occur all the time. A year from the breed council meeting, the council's website presented no information or advice on the disease. Some owners and breeders provided samples for the research but there were none from Walkon Boxers, despite Walker Miller being on the health committee and being a veterinary surgeon himself. Yvonne Miller in a written statement, insisted that her offer of blood samples was rejected as being of no interest, a claim contested by Cattanach. Mair noted in a statement that she was willing to give a sample from Gucci, but understood that Cattanach already had enough samples. She stated that no dogs in her kennel were affected and seemed under the impression that early research focused only on affected dogs. Both kennels registered litters that year with inbreeding levels much higher than the breed average. They also bred from dogs that an independent geneticist thought could be carriers. Both kennels said that they would not breed from any dogs thought to be carriers, that they take genetic diversity into account when breeding, and that the health and welfare of their dogs is and always has been of paramount importance.

[T]his has got to stop, this has to stop. People come to us to buy dogs in good faith. They buy a pet that soon becomes somebody's best friend. We don't breed dogs knowing that they are going to die. You don't do that. ... I have a duty and responsibility to those people that bought their puppies from me.

— Breeder Sharon McCurdy

Inbreeding and the use of popular studs are not limited to Boxers, and both practices lead to the reduction in genetic diversity, which poses a serious threat to the long-term survival of many breeds.

==== Kennel Club ====
The Kennel Club committed £1.2 million after PDE to a new Kennel Club genetics centre to focus on development of new DNA tests. It developed an online tool called Mate Select, which allows people to look up health test results and inbreeding level of individual dogs compared to the breed average. The database can also calculate for breeders the coefficient of inbreeding (COI) that two selected dogs will produce. A father/daughter mating will produce puppies with a COI of 25%. Such matings are now banned by the Kennel Club but many dogs registered will have a much higher COI than this, despite no close matings. This is because of decades of "keeping it in the family" with common ancestors appearing repeatedly in the distant pedigree. Geneticist Steve Jones says damage can be reduced by banning close inbreeding; mating with cousins is almost as bad and if such matings continue, problems build up. Some breeders go to considerable lengths to make the most of genetic diversity in their breeds, but dogs will suffer while the Kennel Club still allows this degree of inbreeding. Jones says the measures taken so far are tentative and reluctant.

The Kennel Club says it prefers education over regulation, but the programme says the Kennel Club must do more. It has no proposal for a maximum level of inbreeding, unlike the Swedish Kennel Club. In that country, no Boxer born in the past two years has a COI of more than 6.25% and the case is similar for other breeds. Breed clubs have also set limits to reduce the impact of popular sires.

Jones states that the Boxer case is an example of how rapidly you can cause damage. Breeders need to stand back and look at the bigger problem. Why would anyone breed animals that suffer except for vanity?

=== Exaggerations ===
Another part of the problem is how show rings change the appearances of breeds, rarely for the better. Old footage from PDE showed the extent of changes in Dachshunds, Bull Terriers and Bulldogs. The latter need assistance to mate and give birth because of exaggerated traits. Evans states that some people had been desensitized to the extent that they see breeding of deformed and diseased animals as normal. The Kennel Club increased training for judges after PDE and made changes to the standards of 78 breeds. There were "howls of protest" from some breeders. It was not the first time that the Kennel Club had revised standards in response to criticism. Archive footage from 1986 shows the Kennel Club stating that they were removing clauses that require exaggerations. The programme argues that it neither worked then nor now, judging by the animals still winning in show rings. Crispin comments on a top Bulldog of 2011, that no judges should place a Bulldog with such morphology and shape while the owner protests that there is nothing wrong with the dog. Bateson is disappointed that the same thing still goes on after everything that has been done. It is 25 years since similar criticism of Bulldogs were made in the 1986 programme.

Veterinary checks of Crufts show winners in 15 high-profile breeds starting in 2012 will help, but more is needed. More radical checks of breed standards are needed to reverse exaggerations, says British Veterinary Association's Harvey Locke. He states that people should be going for Bulldogs with long snouts. Moderate types of many breeds already exist, and the programme shows pictures of them and suggests embracing the Leavitt Bulldog and dumping the current show Bulldogs, choosing the working Albany Basset over show Basset Hounds, original Chinese Shar Pei over the wrinkly Western type, and working Neapolitan Mastiffs over show types. Evans states that it is not possible to make already genetically poor dogs better through beauty pageants, comparing it to "polishing a turd". He says that a dog show that actually focused on health and welfare could make a massive difference, but that a new start might be needed.

==== Pugs and other brachycephalic breeds ====
The original PDE had shown a Pug that qualified for Crufts competition was born to a Crufts champion with numerous health problems typical in the breed: kneecaps sitting out of their joints, partially collapsed larynx, elongated soft palate, narrowing of nasal cavity, inward rolling of lower eyelids and curvature of the spine. Three Years On also developed considerable airtime to this variety of dog. Breeding for the Pug's curled tail is thought to be the reason for the deformed spine, with breed standard calling for the tail to be "curled as tightly as possible" and "double curl highly desirable". The vertebrae have to be of unusual shapes for the tail to form a corkscrew when fit together. This likely increases the instances of abnormalities elsewhere in the spine, according to Cambridge professor Nick Jeffery. There is currently a breed club screening program for the spine, but it is making little progress. The current standard has been softened to state that the tail should be "tightly curled over the hip", but it still notes a double curl to be highly desirable. Muzzle standard has been changed from "short" to "relatively short". The programme states that Pugs in show rings are still so flat-faced that the RSPCA started a campaign to highlight issues in brachycephalic (broad and short-faced) breeds.

There is increasingly compelling evidence that when taken to extremes, the condition may be catastrophic for the dogs. The struggling for air is one of the most frightening feelings a man or an animal can have, states Gerhard Oechtering, a professor of veterinary medicine at the University of Leipzig and one of the world's leading experts in the treatment of brachycephalic airway disease. Some Pugs have to constantly battle to breathe, and in extreme cases may need surgery for relief. A German Pug owner has traveled 600 km to the University of Leipzig for pioneering surgery. The dog, Cissy, likes to keep her head up when she lies down, even when sleeping. Numerous videos on YouTube shows Pugs falling asleep sitting or standing up. One clip from YouTube which was presented as a funny video, was shown in the programme. Some Pugs behave in this way because their airways close when they drop their heads. Cissy also has a tongue too big for her mouth, shallow eye sockets that increases the risk of eyes popping out and overcrowded teeth.

"Many owners do not realize how much their dog is suffering", states Oechtering. His research shows that the part of the nose critical in controlling body temperature is significantly smaller in the Pug than in the normocephalic (i.e., typical-dog-faced) German Shepherd Dog (even proportional to the dogs' differing overall sizes), and what little of it is there blocks the airways. This makes Pugs at risk for heat stroke. There is no fix for the nose, but Oechtering conducts a surgery to remove excess tissue blocking the airways. While the Pug is anesthetized, he parts the "huge mass of redundant skin" above its nose to reveal a fold filled with gunk. Owners can find it difficult to keep the fold clean as the dogs may resist attempts to do so.

We view through an endoscope inserted through the nostrils an airway which is "more or less severely obstructed". A laser is used to remove abnormal tissue blocking the nasal passages. A procedure to widen the pinched nostrils was also performed. The final procedure removed excess tissue from the throat. Insurance claims from such surgeries has risen 25% over the past three years. Oechtering considers it unbelievable that such invasive surgeries are needed just to repair the basic needs of a dog and believes people should stop breeding brachycephalic dogs. "Breeders proved not only in your country, in our country and the whole world...that they are not able to breed healthy animals. They proved that they created one disease after the other."

=== Conclusion ===
The film states that it is time to call a halt to the suffering, and suggested that as long as the Kennel Club is permitted to tolerate human whim leading to dogs that cannot run, breathe, or see freely, it will never change. The Kennel Club refused to participate in the film, which concluded that had the Kennel Club done so, it would surely have said that it is doing all it can while keeping breeders on board. The Kennel Club has a massive conflict of interest in juggling its commitments to breeders and to dogs. When the interest of dogs does not match up with that of breeders, the dogs suffer. Evans states that the Kennel Club is not fit for function (the Kennel Club has a "fit for function, fit for life" campaign) when it comes to protecting the welfare of dogs. He believes the problem will not be resolved if left to the Kennel Club. The dog breeding advisory council is underfunded and has no real powers. Crispin states "there is nothing we can use to beat people over the head, we are there to examine evidence and make recommendations based on evidence. I hope people will regard our recommendations as important, but we can't get tough; we don't have any legislative powers."

The programme ends by calling for an independent government-backed regulatory body to drive through meaningful reform for the welfare of dogs. The body would be funded by a national registration scheme for all dogs and would also deal with other pressing dog issues such as stray dogs, dangerous dogs and puppy farms. The film exhorts consumers to consider that they have a responsibility to examine their attraction to dogs that would not look out of place in a Victorian freak show, and to reject dogs that are unacceptable.

== Reaction ==
The Kennel Club explained that its decision not to take part in the programme was due to concern that the programme would "repeat the same mistakes as last time, leading puppy buyers to think that the problems of breeding for looks and money over welfare are not relevant to the entire dog population, thus helping to boost the sales of disreputable breeders of designer crossbreeds". It also referred to its partially upheld complaints to Ofcom about the first program.

It states that the programme raised important issues, which the Kennel Club is working to resolve, but that the vast majority of breeders care about the health and welfare of dogs. Dog breeders in the country are "effectively unregulated" and the Kennel Club has no legislative power. This means that breeders can get away with breeding at the expense of welfare, be it pedigree or crossbreed breeders. It states that breed standards (revised with input from the veterinary profession) make it clear that exaggerated features are not acceptable. It will be introducing veterinary checks at shows, starting with Crufts 2012, to ensure that judges only reward healthy dogs. The vet checks at Crufts proved controversial as six of the 15 high-profile breed champions that were subject to the checks failed them. Top breeders, exhibitors and judges felt "saddened, furious and slighted".
