= Fiacre's First and Foremost =

Dalmatian dog

AKC CH/UKC GR CH Fiacre's First and Foremost UK CC
- Other name: Fiona
- Species: Dog
- Breed: Dalmatian
- Sex: Female
- Born: 9 September 2007
- Nationality: United States
- Occupation: Show dog
- Years active: 2007 to present
- Parents: Aberdeen's All That Jazz (sire); Ch. Fiacre's Cover Girl (dam)

Ch. Fiacre's First and Foremost (born 9 September 2007), also known as Fiona, is a Dalmatian bred to have low levels of uric acid. She is registered to the United Kennel Club Dalmatian Breed Club in America and was registered with the American Kennel Club in 2011, when LUA Dalmatians were granted entry into the AKC. She became the first low uric acid Dalmatian to compete at Crufts in the United Kingdom in 2011.

== Background and early life ==
Dr. Robert Schaible started a breeding program in 1973 to outcross an American Kennel Club (AKC) champion Dalmatian with a Pointer to correct a genetic defect in the Dalmatian breed that affects the metabolism of uric acid. This condition can lead to a variety of complications, including urate crystal arthropathy, bladder stones, obstruction of the urinary tract and potentially death.

Fiona was born on September 9, 2007, in Nevada, her unique breeding name being "Fiacre's First and Foremost". She has liver spots. She is the 15th generation of the cross conducted by Dr. Schaible, which makes her 99.98% Dalmatian.

She has been tested for the mutated gene that causes high uric acid levels, and the results showed she carried the normal genes for uric acid levels. Dogs with a single normal gene will have low levels of uric acid, but their offspring can have either high or low levels of uric acid; however, dogs like Fiona who have two normal genes have low uric acid levels and all of their offspring will have low levels of uric acid, regardless of the dog to which it is bred.

== Show career ==
She completed her championship in the UKC after four shows. By the time she was six months old, she placed Reserve Best in Show on three occasions, and won one Best in Show. She became the UKC top-ranked Dalmatian for 2008 and 2009, winning the Companion Group at the UKC's premier show, the first time a Dalmatian has achieved this. At the show in 2010, Fiona became a UKC "Total" dog, winning the conformation competition and receiving a qualifying score in a performance event.

In August 2010, she was moved to live with Julie Evans in Barmouth, North Wales. Julie had been working to convince The Kennel Club (UK) to register low uric Dalmatians. Two Kennel Club judges assessed Fiona and confirmed she was a Dalmatian and eligible to compete at Kennel Club shows. At her first show in the UK at the British Utility Breeds Association (BUBA), she placed third in the Limit Bitch class out of 13 entries, which qualified her to compete at the 2011 Crufts show. At three further shows, she placed Best of Breed twice and won the group once. As qualification for Crufts is earned in shows in the year prior to the event, Fiona placed Second Limit Bitch at the Boston and District Canine Society on January 9, 2011, qualifying her for Crufts in 2012.

Fiona's entry at Crufts has caused some uproar among traditionalists. Anne Harcraft, a dog breeder, said, "This is a dog that is not purebred. This is a mongrel. You can't cross a Dalmatian with a pointer and say it's a Dalmatian. This is unethical and I'd be disgusted if the dog won." Jemima Harrison, the producer of Pedigree Dogs Exposed, said of the criticism Fiona has received, "It is astonishing but true that the majority of breeders would rather have sick dogs than allow a single drop of foreign blood to taint their breeds." The Utility Group competition, of which the Dalmatian breed is part, at Crufts 2011 took place on March 13, 2011. Bookmaker William Hill gave odds of 16 to 1 for Fiona to win Best in Breed. Fiona ultimately did not place, with best of breed going to Ch. Dalmark The Shaded Moon at Nospar JW.

In 2012, Fiona returned to the United States and completed her championship with the American Kennel Club in 2012 with five major wins.

== See also ==
- List of individual dogs
