= Pedigree Dogs Exposed =

2008 documentary by BBC One

- Genre: Documentary
- Narrated by: Jemima Harrison
- Country of origin: United Kingdom

Production
- Producer: Jemima Harrison
- Running time: 60 minutes
- Production company: Passionate Productions

Original release
- Network: BBC One
- Release: 19 August 2008

Pedigree Dogs Exposed is a BBC One investigative documentary, produced by Jemima Harrison, which looks into health and welfare issues facing pedigree dogs in the United Kingdom. It was originally broadcast on 19 August 2008.

The Kennel Club (KC), the governing body of pedigree dogs in the UK which runs the prestigious dog breed show Crufts, was criticised for allowing breed standards, judging standards, and breeding practices to compromise the health of pedigree dogs.

The programme generated much criticism of the Kennel Club. It also caused various sponsors and trade exhibitors to withdraw their participation from Crufts and other Kennel Club events. The BBC—which had broadcast Crufts for 42 years—withdrew its coverage of Crufts in 2009, and chose not to renew it thereafter.

The Kennel Club initially denied the filmmakers' assertion that many of the dogs suffered from diseases and stated that the vast majority of dog breeds are healthy. It also lodged a complaint with broadcasting regulator Ofcom, claiming unfair treatment and editing. Due to strong public reaction, it later rolled out new health plans and reviewed breed standards for every breed, an action which some breeders condemned as an overreaction. Ofcom's final ruling upheld KC's complaints regarding the lack of a right of reply for some allegations made by the programme, but dismissed complaints made in various other areas. The ruling also acknowledged that KC's geneticist Jeff Sampson's views were misrepresented, but stated that as a whole, the KC was not treated unfairly by the programme.

Three separate health reports were commissioned as a result of the programme. Reports by the Royal Society for the Prevention of Cruelty to Animals, Associate Parliamentary Group for Animal Welfare and Sir Patrick Bateson (funded by the Kennel Club and Dogs Trust) concluded that breeding practices held by the KC were detrimental to the welfare of pedigree dogs and made various recommendations to be taken by the Kennel Club and breeders to improve pedigree dog health.

A follow-up programme, Pedigree Dogs Exposed: Three Years On, was broadcast on BBC 4 on 27 February 2012.

== Content ==
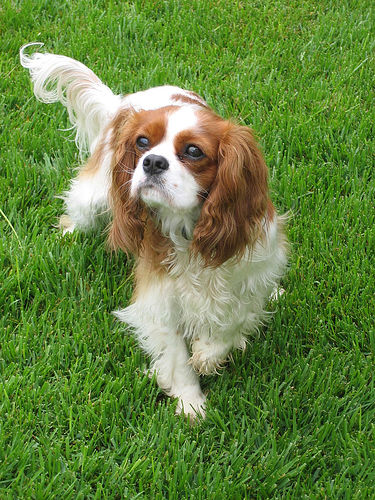
The Cavalier King Charles Spaniel can suffer from mitral valve disease and syringomyelia

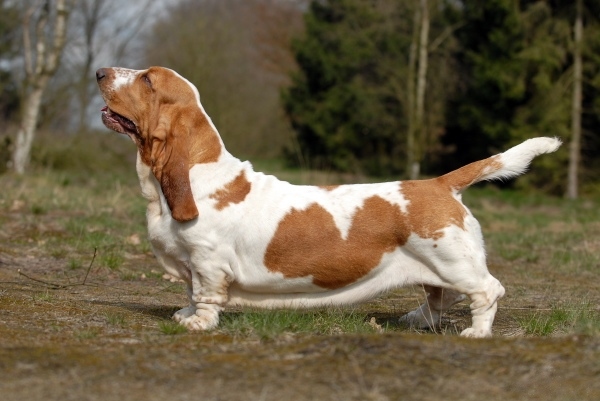
The Basset Hound was called a "deformed congenital dwarf."

The documentary follows a number of dog breeds, investigating health and welfare concerns arising from the breeds and their breed standards. A Cavalier King Charles Spaniel is shown suffering from syringomyelia, a condition that reduces the space available inside the skull for the brain; veterinary neurologist Dr Claire Rusbridge describes the brain in this condition as a "size 10 foot that's been shoved into a size 6 shoe", and estimates that up to a third of the breed suffers from this problem. Cavalier King Charles Spaniels are also explained to suffer from higher rates of heart disease, with cardiologist Simon Swift explaining that roughly half of all Cavaliers aged 5 experience heart murmurs, a rate increasing to almost all Cavaliers by ages 10 to 11.

The documentary states that around three-quarters of the 7 million dogs in the UK are pedigree breeds, resulting in £10m of vet fees weekly. Geneticist Steve Jones attributes the issues faced by pedigree breeds to inbreeding; RSPCA Chief Vet Mark Evans singles out competitive dog showing as responsible for pedigree breed health issues.

The programme goes on to explain how breed standards have developed and changed in comparison with breed standards of the previous century. Old photos of the Dachshund, Basset Hound, Bull Terrier, Bulldog, Pug and German Shepherd Dog illustrate these changes, with working German Shepherds closer to old breed standards than a German Shepherd shown in the show ring. Crufts Judge Terry Hannan insists that working German Shepherds are anatomically incorrect, and that it is the show dog that conforms to the breed standard. The programme puts to the Chairman of the Basset Hound Club that the club is breeding congenital dwarfism into the breed; the chairman rejects this accusation, claiming that modern-day Basset Hounds resemble those of the 1800s closely.

Historian David Hancock counters the claims that Bulldogs are bred for extreme traits, such as a severe underbite and facial wrinkles, to reflect tradition, and that these traits were bred in historically for fighting purposes. The programme states that Bulldogs heads have become so large that the majority of Bulldogs undergo Caesarian sections, as they are unable to give birth without surgical intervention.

The programme analyses that dogs were initially bred for practical functions such as hunting and guarding, but in the middle of the 19th century, breed standards began to shift, as dogs became a status symbol and dog breeding became a sport, and the function of a dog became a secondary consideration after appearance. Evans describes Crufts as a "parade of mutants" and "a freakish, garish beauty pageant that has frankly nothing to do with health and welfare", pointing out that breed standards take no account of temperament and fitness for purpose.

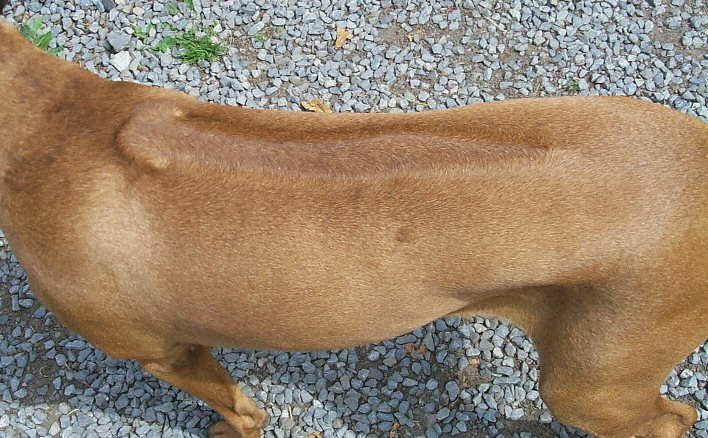
The ridge on the Rhodesian Ridgeback is a distinct characteristic of the breed. The Ridgeback Club's code of ethics states that "ridgeless puppies shall be culled".

The programme traces the Kennel Club's history to the eugenics movement, on which it says purebred dog breeding is based. A Rhodesian Ridgeback breeder interviewed for the documentary advocates for the culling of healthy puppies that do not display the "ridge" trait of the breed, as breed standards forbid ridgelessness; one in 20 puppies is born ridgeless. The Chairman of the Rhodesian Ridgeback Club states that ridgelessness is a genetic fault; the ridge, a genetic trait, is claimed to increase the likelihood of the dog suffering from dermoid sinus. The programme mistakenly claims that the ridge itself is a mild form of spina bifida. A section of the code of ethics of the Rhodesian Ridgeback Club is shown to state that "Ridgeless puppies shall be culled."

When asked about the practice of culling healthy puppies (with the implication that killing them was what was meant), Kennel Club chairman Ronnie Irving denies knowledge of such practices, and states that they were not acceptable. Following the interview, the documentary shows that the Kennel Club wrote to the Rhodesian Ridgeback Club to condemn the practice, and requested that the club review their code of ethics. The breed club responded that the Kennel Club knew about the code of ethics, as they are ratified by the Kennel Club each year.

Apart from Ridgebacks, other examples of culling for cosmetic reasons mentioned include Great Danes with nonstandard markings, white German Shepherds, and white Boxers. It is stated by the programme that culling by slaughter is not as common as it previously was, as more breeders choose to neuter individuals who do not meet breed standards, with there being a demand for pure-bred, but not show-standard, dogs available as pets. The documentary states that selectively-bred dogs had "poorer health" than mongrels.

The documentary shifts to focus on the practice of deliberate inbreeding within pedigree dogs, said to result in the serious genetic diseases present in many breeds. A 2006 report by the Companion Animal Welfare Council calls for the controlling of inbreeding practices within pedigree dogs, and that "animals with genetic defects should be barred from breed shows". Irving rejects the claims in the report, saying they are based on emotions rather than science. A 2004 paper authored by the Kennel Club's own geneticist Jeff Sampson mentions that "Unfortunately, the restrictive breeding patterns that have been developed as part and parcel of the purebred dog scene have not been without collateral damage to all breeds..." and that "increasingly, inherited diseases are imposing a serious disease burden on many, if not all, breeds of dogs." When interviewed for the programme, Sampson claims that "the vast majority of dogs we register [...] will live long, happy, and healthy lives." A study by Imperial College, London, shows that the 10,000 Pugs in the UK are so inbred that their gene pool is the equivalent of only 50 individuals.

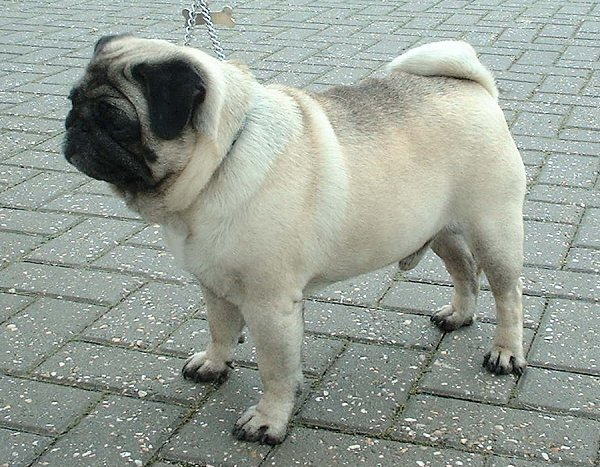
The gene pool of the 10,000 Pugs in the UK is the equivalent of only 50 individuals.

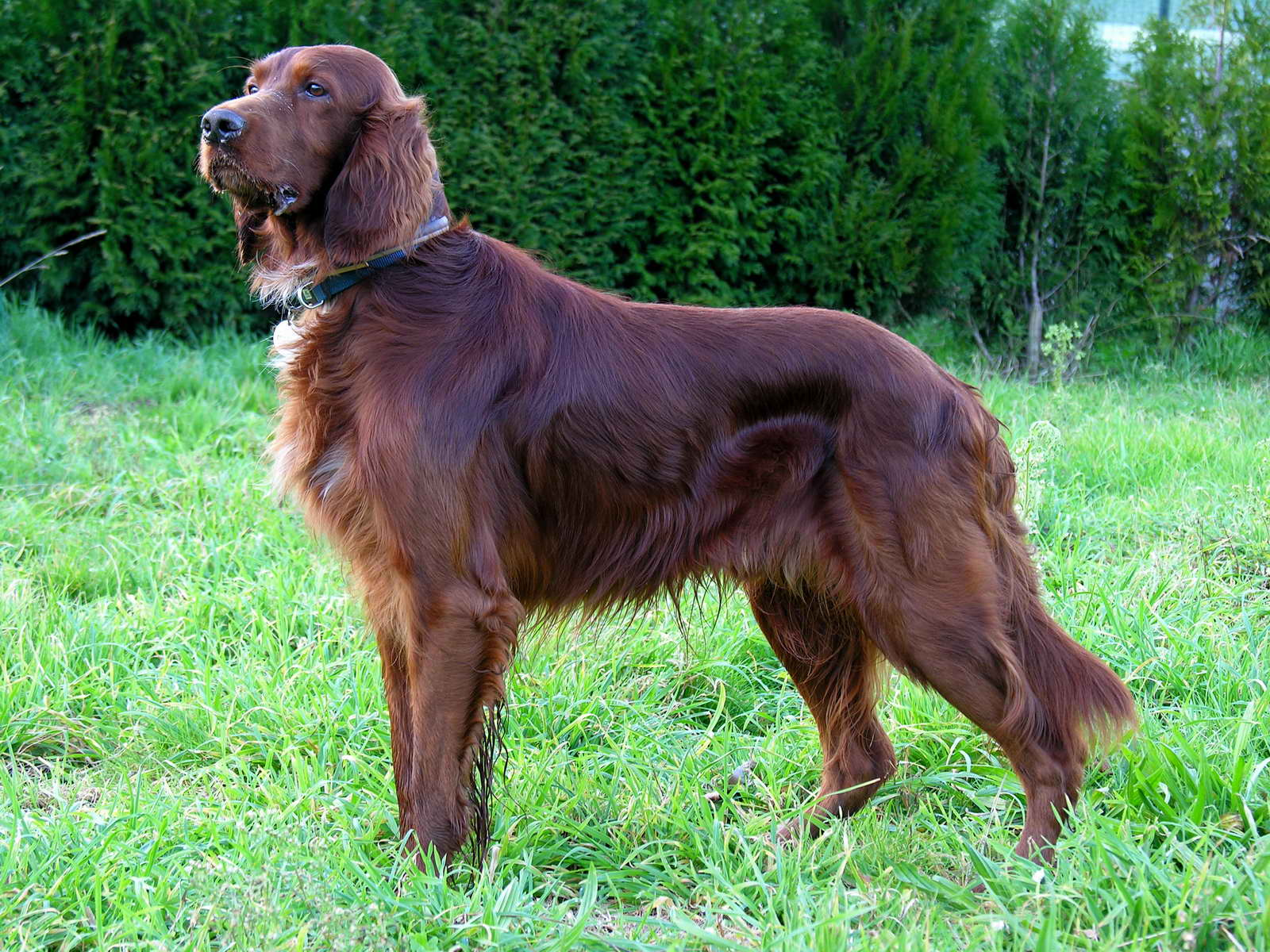
The Irish Setter, one of only two breeds among the more than 200 breeds registered by the Kennel Club with compulsory health testing.

The documentary shows that of the more than 200 breeds registered by the Kennel Club, compulsory health tests exist only for the Irish Setter and the Irish Red and White Setter. The Kennel Club defends the lack of health testing requirements, stating that increasing these requirements would drive breeders away from the club. The President of the British Veterinary Association, Dr Nick Blayney BVSc MRCVS, agrees with the Kennel Club, stating that "if it becomes too reactionary and loses the support of the majority, it would cease to have any influence", and the club was "doing the best they can in a very difficult situation".

The programme points out that no official system for recording hereditary diseases exists, and claims that any health screens that exist are "often inadequate or ineffective"; responsible breeders of Cavalier King Charles Spaniels have used heart screening tests since 1995, but the programme reports that many breeders ignore veterinarian advice to only breed dogs over a certain age, thus having no impact on the rates of heart disease within the breed.

The programme acknowledges the Kennel Club's attempts to fix health issues, in the form of the Accredited Breeder Scheme, and funding for DNA tests, but states that neither fix the issues of inbreeding faced in pedigree dog breeding. The programme also acknowledges that Chairman Ronnie Irving had previously spoken out about the exaggerated traits in some breeds, such as the Bulldog's, and that breed standards had been changed to temper these exaggerations; the Kennel Club had also added health and welfare issues to the curriculum for judges.

The programme shows examples of individuals with serious inherited diseases being crowned show champions. Such individuals are not forbidden from being bred and some go on to produce offspring who inherit the same diseases. It reports that the 2003 Crufts champion – a Pekingese – had to sit on an ice pack to have its photo taken, as the breed has a tendency to overheat, caused by an inability to cool down as a result of its flattened face. The dog was revealed to have undergone a soft palate resection earlier. Professor Dan Brockman from the Royal Veterinary College explains that the condition is inherited and is very likely to be passed down to later generations.

The programme states that attempts by individual dog breeders to change the system face difficulties, and that though the Kennel Club had begun funding research into syringomyelia in Cavaliers, many breeders did not take the issue seriously. A Cavalier that won a Best-in-Show was revealed by Carter to have syringomyelia. Despite veterinarian advice not to breed from the dog, the dog went on to sire 26 litters, adding to the eight litters sired before the diagnosis.

When told that the Kennel Club was not doing enough, Irving rejects the claim that many breeds were in trouble, and states that the Kennel Club and its Charitable Trust are doing much to fix the problems in "some breeds". The programme ends with Evans calling for a "complete top-to-bottom review of breed standards and the rules and regulations of dog showing to move it away from its obsession with beauty through to quality of life".

== Reaction ==
The programme, which spanned a production period of two years, was watched by 3.9 million viewers.

Before the programme aired, the Kennel Club issued a statement warning that the programme may be highly biased. After the airing, it released multiple press releases questioning the neutrality and "sensationalism" of the programme. It also lodged a complaint to broadcasting regulator Ofcom claiming "unfair treatment and editing". The BBC has stood by the journalism in the documentary.

The Rhodesian Ridgeback Club calls "absolute nonsense" the programme's claim that the ridge "serves no purpose" and says the ridge "defines the breed from any other large brown dog without a ridge which might be considered a crossbreed i.e. mastiff x pitbull or boxer x mastiff". Regarding the code of ethics statement which says "Ridgeless puppies shall be culled at birth", the Club points to the statement that follows, "if a breeder finds this morally impossible the puppy shall be homed". as indication that culling is not mandatory. They have since revised their code of ethics to say "no healthy puppy will be culled".

The RSPCA stated that it is "concerned about the unacceptably high levels of disability, deformity and disease affecting pedigree dogs".

In his speech at the Welsh Kennel Club championship two days after the programme aired, Kennel Club Chairman Ronnie Irving said that "If this programme teaches us anything, I hope it will teach the 'purists' in some breeds that they simply must get a move on and realise that in these politically correct and well informed days, some old attitudes are simply no longer sustainable." Maintaining that the majority of dogs are healthy he said that "the roughly 90% of us who thankfully have healthy breeds must continue to guard against exaggeration and must bring pressure to bear on the laggards, otherwise we will – all of us – continue to be tarred with the same brush".

Dogs Today editor Beverley Cuddy, who said in the programme that "dogs are falling apart" and "the number of genetic problems are increasing at a frightening pace", disputes the Kennel Club's 90% figure. She points to a Kennel Club/British Small Animal Veterinary Association health survey, which shows that 37.4% of dogs had at least one serious health issue by age 5, and adds that the Kennel Club had to discount conditions such as hip dysplasia, slipping patellas and hereditary cataracts to get their 90% figure.

On 5 October 2008, Margaret Carter, who revealed the health condition of the Best-of-Breed Cavalier in the film, was voted out of the Cavalier King Charles Spaniel Club (CKCSC) committee by its members in a Special General Meeting for "breach of confidentiality". The Kennel Club has expressed concerns with the decision by CKCSC. In January 2009, backed by grassroots members, Carter sought reelection to the committee, but was elected without a ballot being required as she was the only nominee. She has since withdrawn her nomination and quit the breed club after the club chairman, vice-chairman and secretary announced their resignation in response to Carter's nomination. Carter told The Times: "My only interest was to improve the health of the dogs and it has never been my intention to damage the Cavalier King Charles club where I have been a loyal member for more than 30 years ... The top showing people and breeders are the ones most threatened by health testing. They either want to win in the show ring or make money and they don't want health problems talked about." Club chairman Lesley Jupp said that "Her presence on the committee was unacceptable in the circumstances. Some people would have found it very difficult to work with her".

As a consequence of the programme, cat breeders have too come under pressure from veterinary and animal welfare associations, with breeds such as the Persian, Scottish Fold and Munchkin being singled out.

=== Sponsorships ===
After the programme aired, the BBC, which had broadcast Crufts for 42 years, announced that it was considering cutting its ties with the show. The club, too, was reconsidering their association with BBC, saying that they were confident of finding another broadcaster should things turn sour. Various sponsors, including the Royal Society for the Prevention of Cruelty to Animals, the People's Dispensary for Sick Animals and the UK's largest dog welfare charity, Dogs Trust, have since pulled out of the show. On 24 October, principal sponsor Pedigree Petfoods withdrew their sponsorship of Crufts—estimated at between £0.5 to £1.5 million per year—ending a 44-year relationship; however, it remained an official sponsor through their Royal Canin brand. This was followed by major sponsor Hill's Pet Nutrition's withdrawal from the event one week later.

On 12 December, the BBC dropped Crufts 2009 from its schedule after failing to agree on terms with the Kennel Club. Their request to drop 12 "at-risk" breeds from the main event was rejected by the Kennel Club, who called the request "unreasonable" and said that it would compromise their "contractual obligations" and "general responsibility to dog exhibitors and our audience". The Kennel Club's contract with the BBC was worth a six-figure annual sum and ended in 2010.

=== Revised breed standards ===
On 7 October 2008, the Kennel Club announced that it was rolling out new health plans. Breed standards for every breed are under review and show judges will be required to take health into judging considerations. It has also requested regulatory powers from the Government, which would allow the club to take actions against breeders who do not comply with health standards. Some breed clubs have condemned the Kennel Club for overreacting. The bulldog breed council has rejected the new Bulldog standard, saying that they are "at a loss to understand in what way the health and general welfare of the breed could be improved by the proposed changes".

On 12 January, the Kennel Club released the revised breed standards, which would "not include anything that could in any way be interpreted as encouraging features that might prevent a dog from breathing, walking and seeing freely". "This will help to prevent the practice of exaggeration, where features that are perceived to be desirable, such as a short muzzle or loose skin, are made more prominent by breeders, and which can have detrimental effects on a dog’s health." Rules to ban close inbreeding (parent/child and sibling/sibling) would take effect from 1 March 2009. Show rules were changed to state "more clearly than ever" that judges should only "reward those dogs that are healthy representatives of their breed". Judges would also have the authority to eject unhealthy dogs from competitions. A Club spokesman said that the changes would take "several generations, to have an effect".

Pedigree Dogs Exposed producer Jemima Harrison called the change "long overdue". RSPCA chief vet Evans welcomed the ban on close inbreeding but said that the breed standard changes were not "radical enough to really make a difference". He also expressed concern about how standards would be interpreted in the show ring. While some breeders showed their support for the new standards, others were upset with the new standards and threatened legal actions against the Kennel Club. The Chairman of the British Bulldog Breed Council said of the new Bulldog standard: "What you'll get is a completely different dog, not a British bulldog. There is no jowl, no upturn of the nose and the legs will no longer be wide in front and narrow behind."

=== Complaints to Ofcom and the BBC ===
Ofcom was set to release the results of its ruling on 9 November, but complaints by the BBC pressured Ofcom to hold off publishing it. The Kennel Club stated its loss of confidence in the Ofcom complaints process.

The findings were eventually released on 9 December. Four of the Kennel Club's five areas of complaint were dismissed. The complaint that was partially upheld was with regard to the lack of a right of reply for some allegations. The Kennel Club claims 15 such instances, but the ruling dismissed all but four: allegations regarding eugenics, comparison with Hitler, association with Nazi racial theory, and the implied cover-up of the operation undergone by the Crufts champion. Two complaints by the Rhodesian Ridgeback Club of Great Britain were upheld: the unfair representation of research on dermoid sinus in Ridgebacks and the club's action with regard to the issue, and the description of the ridge of the breed as a deformity and a form of spina bifida. CKCS breeder Virginia Barwell's claim that she was portrayed as a "ruthless dog breeder" was rejected by Ofcom, but it states that unfair editing oversimplified her views. Complaints by the CKCSC and Michael Randall, a German Shepherd Dog handler who appeared in brief footage, were not upheld.

The Kennel Club complaints upheld in the provisional findings that BBC had contested earlier was the unfair representation of Kennel Club geneticist Jeff Sampson's views and lack of an opportunity to respond for the Crufts champion cover-up claim. While the provisional finding stated that there was "some unfair treatment" of the Kennel Club, the released finding acknowledged that Sampson's views were misrepresented but stated that as a whole, the Kennel Club was not treated unfairly. The Kennel Club said that "Professor Sampson is our senior representative and spokesman on the health and genetic issues affecting dogs. It is therefore surprising that Ofcom doesn’t also conclude, on this occasion, that the Kennel Club itself was therefore unfairly represented. Ofcom changed its mind on this point following its provisional decision."

Breeder Dave Moger, who is the health representative of the South and West Wales Cavalier King Charles Spaniel Club, filed a complaint against the program with the BBC Editorial Complaints Unit immediately after it aired. After pursuing the case for almost two years, going through five layers of the complaints and appeals process, in the final ruling the BBC Trust did not uphold the complaint.

In June 2011, the findings of two more complaints were released. After the Ofcom ruling, Pedigree Dogs Exposed was re-edited for sale and broadcast abroad. The two complaints claimed that the film was still misleading and did not comply with the Ofcom ruling. The BBC Editorial Standards Committee ruled that the re-edited script which says "the ridge predisposes the dogs to a mild form of spina bifida" was still inaccurate. The Committee stated that RSPCA Chief Vet Mark Evans' description of the ridge as a deformity was an expression of his opinion but that the Rhodesian Ridgeback Club representative should have been given a right to reply to that criticism. With regards to a complaint on the emphasis of culling healthy animals, the committee ruled that, while the film still included the statement that "it’s still enshrined in the Rhodesian Ridgeback Club’s code of ethics that ridgeless puppies shall be culled.", the endboard which states that "Since the broadcast of Pedigree Dogs Exposed, the Kennel Club has introduced many changes...these include...a new Code of Ethics which prohibits healthy dogs being culled for cosmetic reasons." satisfied the requirements of the accuracy guidelines. Two other complaints were not upheld.

=== RSPCA Report ===
In February 2009, the results of an independent scientific report commissioned by the RSPCA concluded that "exaggerated physical features and inherited diseases cause serious welfare problems in pedigree dogs". Quoting Arman (2007), the report states that "Society and sections of the veterinary profession have become 'desensitised to the welfare issues to such an extent that the production of anatomically deformed dogs is neither shocking, nor considered abnormal'". It also states that "Breeding practices and efforts by breed societies and kennel clubs, to date, have been ineffective at protecting the welfare of many breeds of domestic dog" and that "changes in breeding and selection practices are urgently required". The Kennel Club states that the report "fails totally to recognise the real steady progress and advance of scientific knowledge that has already been made in the area of pedigree dog health."

=== APGAW inquiry ===
The Associate Parliamentary Group for Animal Welfare (APGAW) released the results of its "inquiry into the health and welfare issues surrounding the breeding of pedigree dogs" in November. The report mentioned the "serious problem with the health and welfare of many pedigree dogs" and how they can be caused by current breeding practices. It made various recommendations: Breed standards should be based less on "visual aesthetics" and more on whether the dogs would be "fit for purpose". Where available for particular breeds, health tests should be strongly recommended and individuals not tested should have their test status reflected in registration certificates and should not be eligible for champion titles. The inquiry also stated that "the KC should make the decision about whether registering dogs or dog health and welfare is their primary objective and focus their attentions more precisely on this when taking this issue forward".

More4 was criticized for their plan to broadcast Crufts 2010. "Until the problems of health and welfare are dealt with, the showing of certain dogs with problems associated with inappropriate breed standards is wrong". A More4 spokesperson stated that its "coverage will place a particular emphasis on health and welfare issues, providing a high profile platform to keep these issues in the public eye – something that has been welcomed by the British Veterinary Association".

The APGAW report indicates that the low breeding standards practiced by some in the Kennel Club's Accredited Breeder Scheme - a scheme meant to help potential dog owners identify responsible breeders - may allow the public to be "falsely led into thinking a puppy they buy from an accredited breeder registered with the KC will have no health or welfare problems associated with its breeding history". It called for more random checks and robust enforcement of the scheme and states that "the use of the word 'pedigree' should be tied to a high standard of breeding (for health and welfare) across the board with the KC not just with the few that decide to join the Accredited Breeder Scheme (ABS)".

The Inquiry believes that ultimately the KC can win back trust by showing that they are willing to take responsibility for dogs registered with them and that they are willing to lose members who do not meet high standards.

The report warned that if the health measures implemented by the Kennel Club fails, government regulations might be necessary. The Kennel Club has issued a response to the report. PDE producer Jemima Harrison condemned the Kennel Club's response, stating that they are downplaying the criticism of the Kennel Club in the report and misrepresenting the findings.

=== Bateson report ===
A peer reviewed independent inquiry into dog breeding, headed by Sir Patrick Bateson and funded by the Kennel Club and Dogs Trust with support from Defra, was released in January 2010.

"Form-driven selective breeding has changed the shape of well-known breeds away from the norm of 50 to 100 years ago by exaggerating specific features considered particularly characteristic of the breed" and in many cases, this has had a negative impact on welfare. In some cases, selection for specific characteristics written in breed standards "can be demonstrated to be directly threatening to health and welfare".

To the outsider, it seems incomprehensible that anyone should admire, let alone acquire, an animal that has difficulty in breathing or walking. Yet people are passionate about owning and breeding animals which they know and love, even though the animals manifestly exhibit serious health and welfare problems ... Notwithstanding the motivations of the breeders, the time has surely come for society as a whole to take a firm grip on the welfare issues that evidently arise in dog breeding.

The report stated that showing and judging is a powerful lever for change, as demonstrated by the change in form for many breeds but that this powerful lever can now be used to achieve the desired improvement in welfare. Revisions to breed standards should "recognise the need to avoid the selection for extreme morphologies that can damage the health and welfare of the dog" and in breeds already with a problem, standards should "encourage the selection for morphologies that will improve the welfare status of the breed".

Excessive levels of inbreeding is caused by a small founding population (see founder effect), the deliberate use of inbreeding (including line breeding) to fix desired characteristics, and closed stud books. While inbreeding "can have the beneficial effect of purging some damaging traits", it can fix recessive deleterious traits, result in accidental selection of deleterious traits and also cause reduced fitness (see inbreeding depression). Although the Kennel Club has already banned parent/child and sibling/sibling inbreeding, the report advised against grandparent/grandchildren matings as well. In breeds with insufficient genetic variations to allow selection towards high welfare dogs, "evidence-based outcrossing to resolve problems must not be ruled out simply to support what are no more than artificial boundaries around breeds."

The formation of a non-statutory Advisory Council on Dog Breeding was recommended as "it is difficult for the club to be both judge and jury when introducing proposals for reforms to breeders who hold strong opinions about dog breeding and are often deeply intransigent."

The report called for a "rigorous, robustly policed and well-respected" quality assurance scheme to help buyers identify good breeders. The Kennel Club was advised to upgrade its Accredited Breeder Scheme promptly and apply for United Kingdom Accreditation Service accreditation, otherwise the Advisory Council should implement a new scheme. The report also covered issues beyond the programme's scope and also touched on large scale dog breeding.

The Kennel Club stated that it "welcomes the report's focus on irresponsible breeders" and the recommendations "to tackle irresponsible breeders and to change the way the public think about buying dogs". It is "glad" that the report "suggests that the Kennel Club’s Accredited Breeder Scheme, with some modification could be used". It claimed that the report "could have gone further".

== International broadcast ==
In Australia, ABC1 aired Pedigree Dogs Exposed on 10 September 2009 provoking a similar public, breeder and media reaction to that surrounding the original BBC broadcast.
