= Dalmatian dog =

Croatian dog breed

Dalmatian
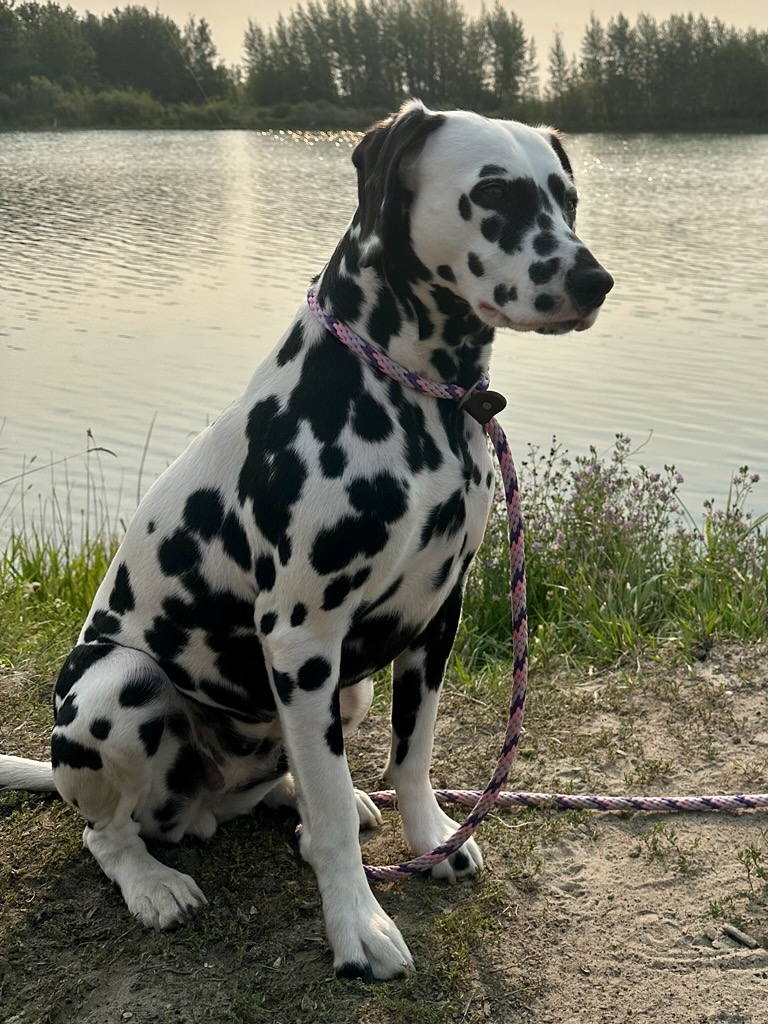
- Other names: Carriage Dog; Spotted Coach Dog; Leopard Carriage Dog; Firehouse Dog; Plum Pudding Dog; Leopard-Spotted Dog
- Origin: Croatia
Traits
| Height | Males | 58–61 cm (23–24 in) |
| | Females | 56–58 cm (22–23 in) |
- Coat: Smooth, short
- Color: White background with black or brown spots and liver-spotted
Kennel club standards
- Croatian Kennel Club: standard
- Fédération Cynologique Internationale: standard

The Dalmatian is a breed of dog with a white coat marked with dark-coloured spots. Originally bred as a hunting dog, it was also used as a carriage dog by firefighters in the days of horse-drawn firehouse carriages. The origins of this breed can be traced to Croatia and the historical region of Dalmatia. It is thought that early ancestors of the breed were certain breeds of pointers and a spotted Great Dane. The modern breed has become a popular companion dog commonly entered by Dalmatian enthusiasts into kennel club competitions.

== Characteristics ==
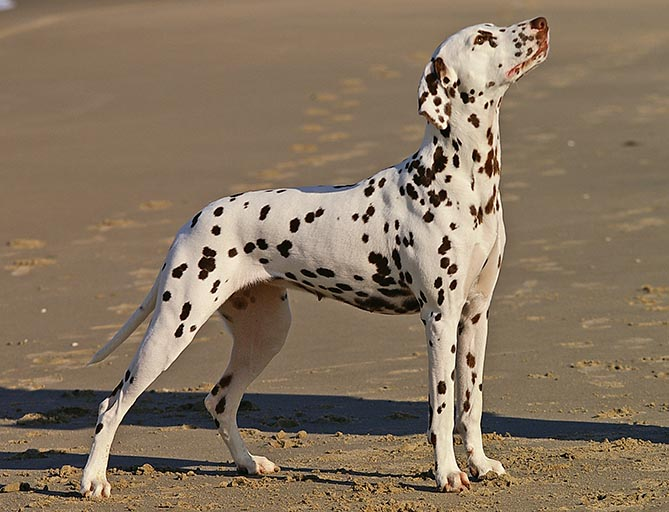
A liver Dalmatian female.

=== Body ===
The Dalmatian is a muscular dog with excellent endurance and stamina. When fully grown, according to the American Kennel Club (AKC) breed standard, it stands from 19 to 23 in (48 to 58 cm) tall.

=== Coat ===
Dalmatian puppies are born with plain white coats and their first spots usually appear within 10 days; however, spots may be visible on their skin from birth. They continue to develop until the dog is around 18 months old. Spots usually range in size from 2 to 6 cm (0.79 to 2.36 in), and are most commonly black or liver (brown) on a white background. Liver is the recessive colour in dalmatians, meaning that both parents have to carry the liver gene to produce this colour of pups. If both parents are liver, then all puppies will be liver-spotted. Black spotted dogs always have black noses, and liver spotted dogs always have brown noses.

Other colours that occur occasionally include blue (a blue-greyish colour), brindle, mosaic, orange or lemon (dark to pale yellow), or tricoloured (with black, brown and orange or lemon spots). Orange and lemon occur the most frequently, especially in America, and are dilutes of the standard colours. They are defined as orange or lemon depending on their nose colour.

Another colouration pattern is a larger solid patch of colour, which appears anywhere on the body, but most often on the head, ears, or tail. Patches are visible at birth and are not a group of connected spots; they are identifiable by the smooth edge of the patch, and they have no interlacing white hairs in them. Pure white individuals without spots also occur occasionally.

The Dalmatian coat is usually short, fine, and dense; however, smooth-coated Dalmatians occasionally produce long-coated offspring. Long-coated Dalmatians are not accepted by the breed standard, but these individuals experience much less shedding than their smooth-coated counterparts, which shed considerably year-round. The standard variety's short, stiff hairs often weave into carpet, clothing, upholstery, and nearly any other kind of fabric and can be difficult to remove. Weekly grooming with a hound mitt or currycomb can lessen the amount of hair Dalmatians shed, although nothing can completely prevent shedding. Due to the minimal amount of oil in their coats, Dalmatians lack a dog odour and stay fairly clean relative to many other dog breeds.

=== Litter size ===
Dalmatians usually have litters of six to nine pups.

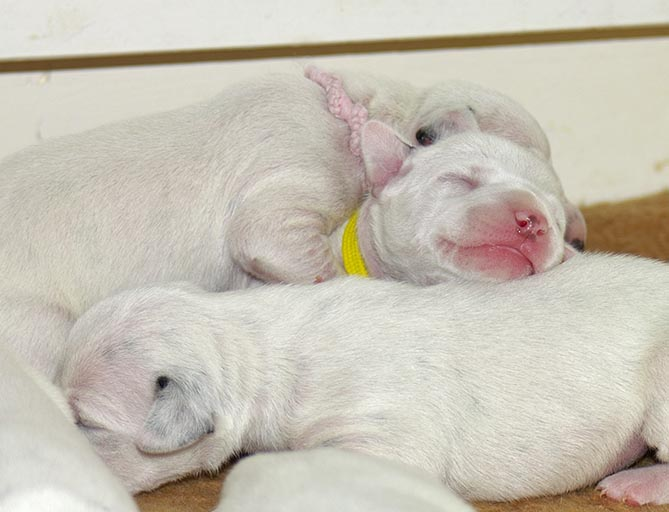
Newborn Dalmatian puppies

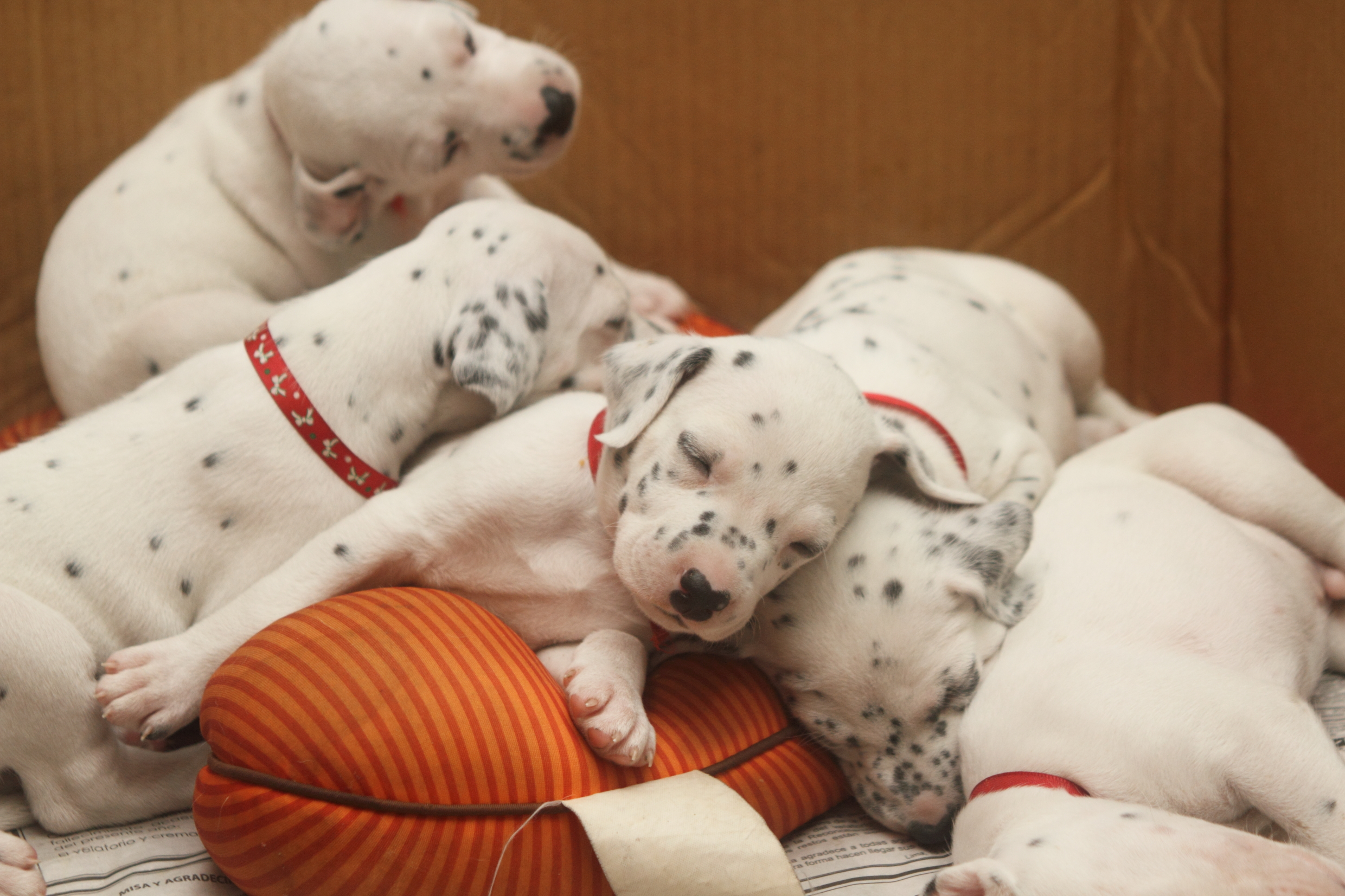
Dalmatian puppies, three weeks old, spots beginning to develop

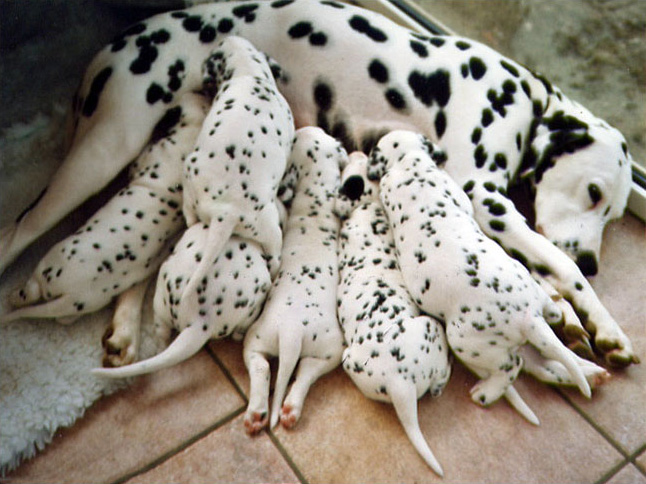
Puppies, four-five weeks old

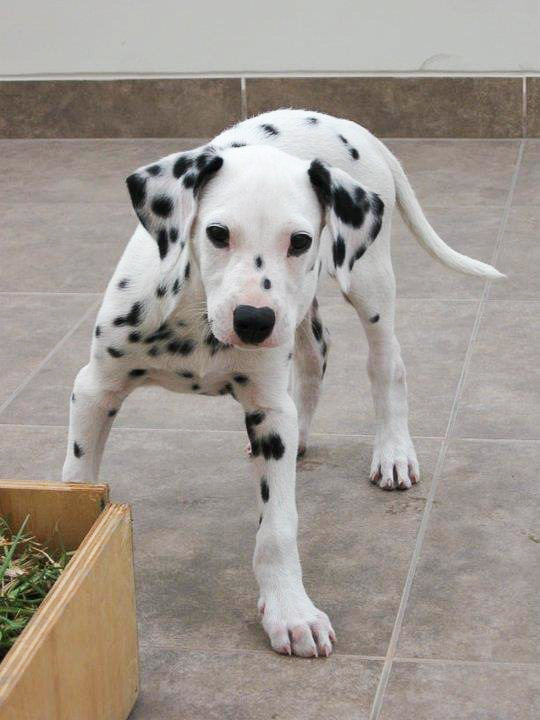
A three-month-old Dalmatian

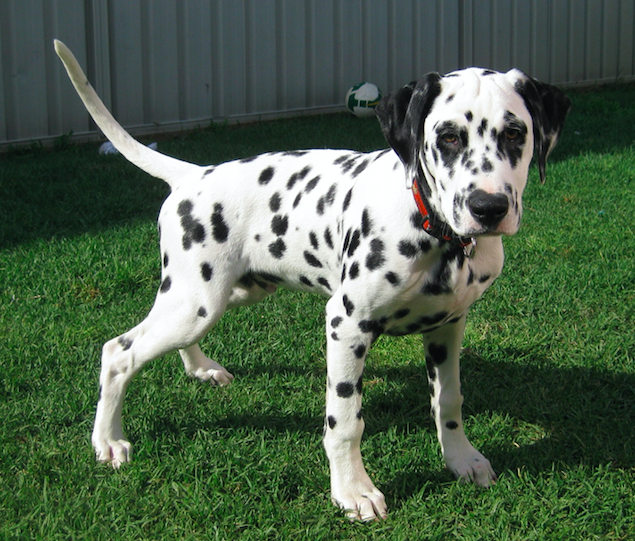
A four-month-old Dalmatian

== Health ==
Blue and brown-eyed Dalmatian

A 2024 UK study found a life expectancy of 13.2 years for the Dalmatian compared to an average of 12.7 for purebreeds and 12 for crossbreeds.

In their late teens, both males and females may suffer from bone spurs and arthritic conditions. Autoimmune thyroiditis may be a relatively common condition for the breed, affecting 11.6% of dogs.

=== Dermatological conditions ===
The breed is predisposed the following dermatological conditions: atopic dermatitis, solar dermatosis, and squamous cell carcinoma.

=== Deafness ===
A study in the UK found 18.4% of tested Dalmatians to be deaf in either one or both ears. This study also found no association between coat colour and deafness. A Swiss study looking at 575 dogs from 33 different families found 16.5% of Dalmatians to be deaf in either one or both ears. A German study of 1899 dogs from 169 different kennels found 19.6% of Dalmatians to be deaf in one or both ears. This study concluded that genes other than those responsible for colouring significantly contributed to deafness. A US study found 25.7% of Dalmatians to be deaf in one or both ears. This study found that the evidence of a single gene being responsible for deafness to be unlikely.

Researchers now know deafness in albino and piebald animals is caused by the absence of mature melanocytes in the inner ear. This may affect one or both ears.

Typically, only dogs with bilateral hearing are bred, although those with unilateral hearing, and even dogs with bilateral deafness, make fine pets with appropriate training. The main, and most noticeable, difference in a dog with uni hearing is that they do not have directional hearing; while sounds are audible to the dog, it will be unable to pinpoint from which direction the sounds are coming. The Dalmatian Club of America's position on deaf pups is that they should not be used for breeding, and that humane euthanasia may be considered as an "alternative to placement". The British Dalmatian Club recommends only purchasing pups who are BAER-tested, and requests all members to provide BAER testing results of their puppies so that the true deafness statistics can be looked at.

It has been proved that it is the inheritance of the extreme piebald gene that causes blue eyes. It is therefore frowned upon to breed from blue-eyed Dalmatians even if they are fully hearing. In the UK, blue eyes are considered a breed standard fault so blue-eyed Dalmatians will not be rewarded in the show ring.

=== Skeletal conditions ===
A North American study of veterinary hospital records found that of over 9,000 Dalmatians, 1.36% had hip dysplasia compared to the overall rate of 3.52%.

=== Hyperuricemia ===
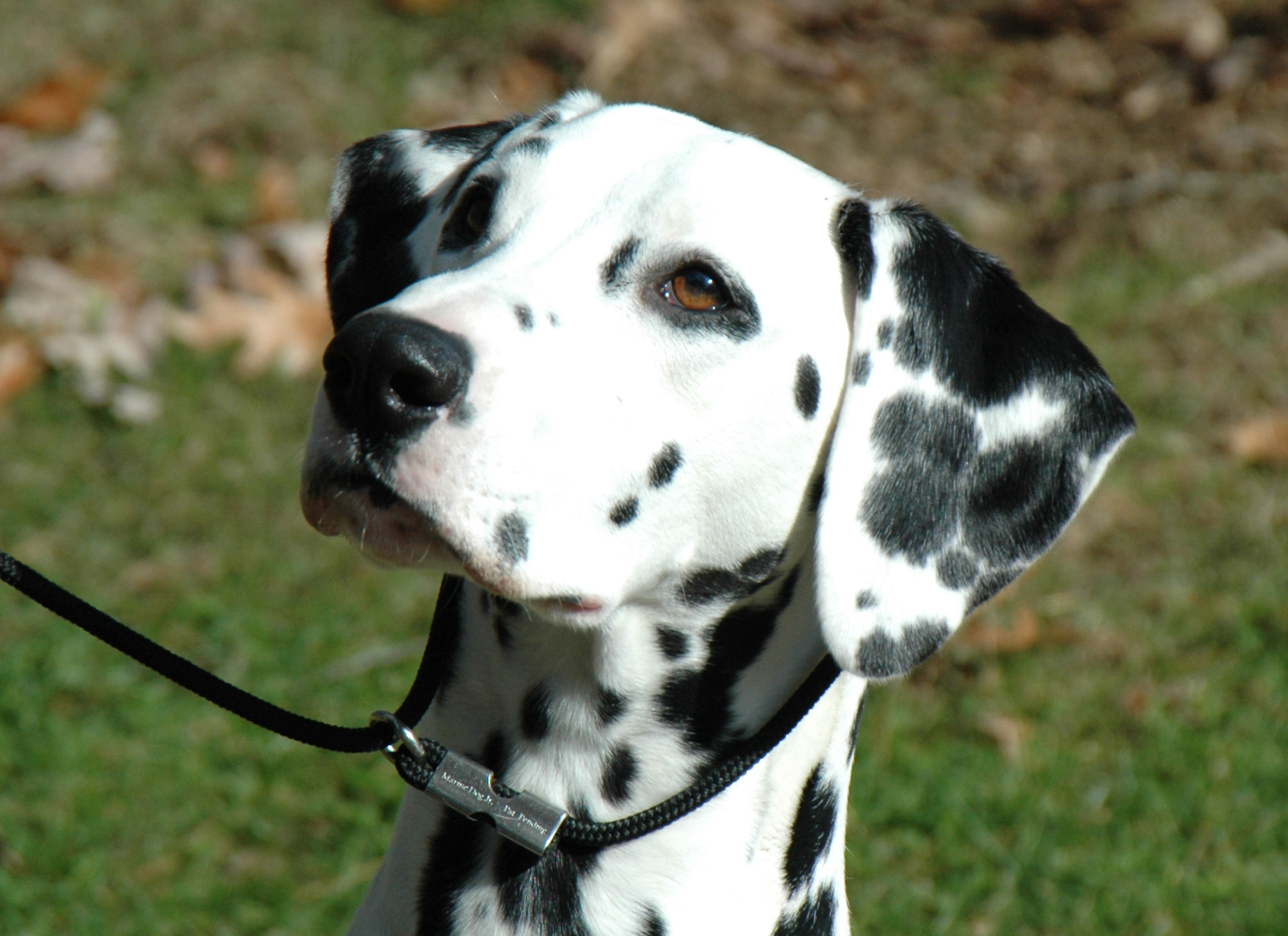
Dalmatian headshot

Dalmatians, like humans, can suffer from hyperuricemia. Dalmatians' livers have trouble breaking down uric acid, which can build up in the blood serum (hyperuricemia) causing gout. Uric acid can also be excreted in high concentration into the urine, causing kidney stones and bladder stones. These conditions are most likely to occur in middle-aged males. Males over ten are prone to kidney stones and should have their calcium intake reduced or be given preventive medication. To reduce the risk of gout and stones, owners should carefully limit the intake of purines by avoiding giving their dogs food containing organ meats, animal byproducts, or other high-purine ingredients. Hyperuricemia in Dalmatians responds to treatment with orgotein, the veterinary formulation of the antioxidant enzyme superoxide dismutase.

==== Dalmatian-Pointer Backcross Project ====
Hyperuricemia in Dalmatians (as in all breeds) is inherited, but unlike other breeds, the normal gene for a uric acid transporter that allows for uric acid to enter liver cells and be subsequently broken down is not present in the breed's gene pool. Therefore, there is no possibility of eliminating hyperuricemia among pure-bred Dalmatians. The only possible solution to this problem must then be crossing Dalmatians with other breeds to reintroduce the normal uric acid transporter gene. This led to the foundation of the Dalmatian-Pointer Backcross Project, which aims to reintroduce the normal uric acid transporter gene into the Dalmatian breed. The backcross used a single English Pointer; subsequent breedings have all been to purebred Dalmatians. This project was started in 1973 by Dr. Robert Schaible. The first cross (F1) hybrids did not resemble Dalmatians very closely. The F1s were then crossed back to purebreds. This breeding produced puppies of closer resemblance to the pure Dalmatian. By the fifth generation in 1981, they resembled purebreds so much, Dr. Schaible convinced the AKC to allow two of the hybrids to be registered as purebreds. Then AKC President William F. Stifel stated, "If there is a logical, scientific way to correct genetic health problems associated with certain breed traits and still preserve the integrity of the breed standard, it is incumbent upon the American Kennel Club to lead the way." The Dalmatian Club of America's (DCA) board of directors supported this decision; however, it quickly became highly controversial among the club members. A vote by DCA members opposed the registration of the hybrids, causing the AKC to ban registration to any of the dog's offspring.

At the annual general meeting of the DCA in May 2006, the backcross issue was discussed again by club members. In June of the same year, DCA members were presented with an opportunity to vote on whether to reopen the discussion of the Dalmatian Backcross Project. The results of this ballot were nearly 2:1 in favor of re-examining support of the project by the DCA. This has begun with the publication of articles presenting more information both in support of and questioning the need for this project. In July 2011, the AKC agreed to allow registration of backcrossed Dalmatians.

In 2010, the UK Kennel Club registered a backcrossed Dalmatian called Ch. Fiacre's First and Foremost. Several restrictions were imposed on the dog. Although the dog is at least 13 generations removed from the original Pointer cross, its F1 to F3 progeny will be marked on registration certificates with asterisks (which "indicate impure or unverified breeding") no progeny will be eligible to be exported as pedigrees for the next five years, and all have to be health tested. UK Dalmatian breed clubs have objected to the decision by the Kennel Club.

Although LUA Dalmatians will not develop the urinary stones, they can still develop other types.

==== Dalmatian Heritage Project ====
The Dalmatian Heritage Project began in 2005. The goal of the project is to preserve and improve the Dalmatian breed by breeding friendly and confident parent dogs with normal urinary metabolism and bilateral hearing. All puppies in the Heritage Project are descendants of Dr. Robert Schaible's parent line.

== History ==
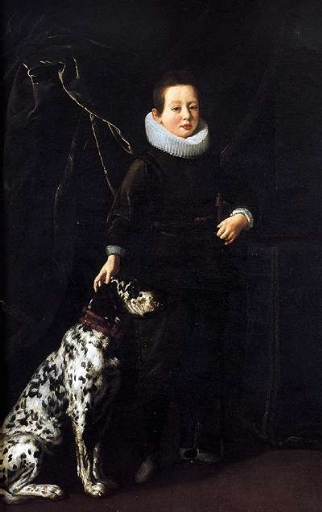
Francesco di Cosimo II de' Medici (1614–1634) with a Dalmatian, by Justus Sustermans

The Fédération Cynologique Internationale (FCI) recognized Croatia as its country of origin, citing several historical sources.

The first known written reference to a Dalmatian dog is from 1375, when Peter, Bishop of Đakovo, mentions a hunting dog principally found in Dalmatia, with short white hair and black round spots on various parts of the body, naming the breed Canis Dalmaticus. The earliest illustrations of the breed have been found in Croatia: an altar painting in Veli Lošinj dating to 1600–1630, and a fresco in Zaostrog. The first definitive documented descriptions of the Dalmatian (Croatian: Dalmatinski pas, Dalmatiner, Dalmatinac) trace back to the early 18th century and the archives of the Archdiocese of Đakovo, where the dog was mentioned and described as Canis Dalmaticus in the church chronicles from 1719 by Bishop Petar Bakić and then again by church chronicles of Andreas Keczkeméty in 1739. In 1771, Thomas Pennant described the breed in his book Synopsis of Quadrupeds, writing that the origin of the breed is from Dalmatia; he referred to it as Dalmatian. The book by Thomas Bewick, A General History of Quadrupeds, published in 1790 refers to the breed as Dalmatian or Coach Dog.

During the Regency period, the Dalmatian became a status symbol and those with decorative spotting were highly prized. The breed was also used to guard the stables at night.

The breed had been developed and cultivated chiefly in England. The first unofficial standard for the breed was introduced by Englishman Vero Shaw in 1882. In 1890 with the formation of the first Dalmatian Club in England, the standard became official. When the dog with the distinctive markings was first shown in England in 1862, it was said to have been used as a guard dog and companion to the nomads of Dalmatia. The breed's unique coat became popular and widely distributed over the continent of Europe beginning in 1920. Its unusual markings were often mentioned by the old writers on cynology.

=== Duties ===
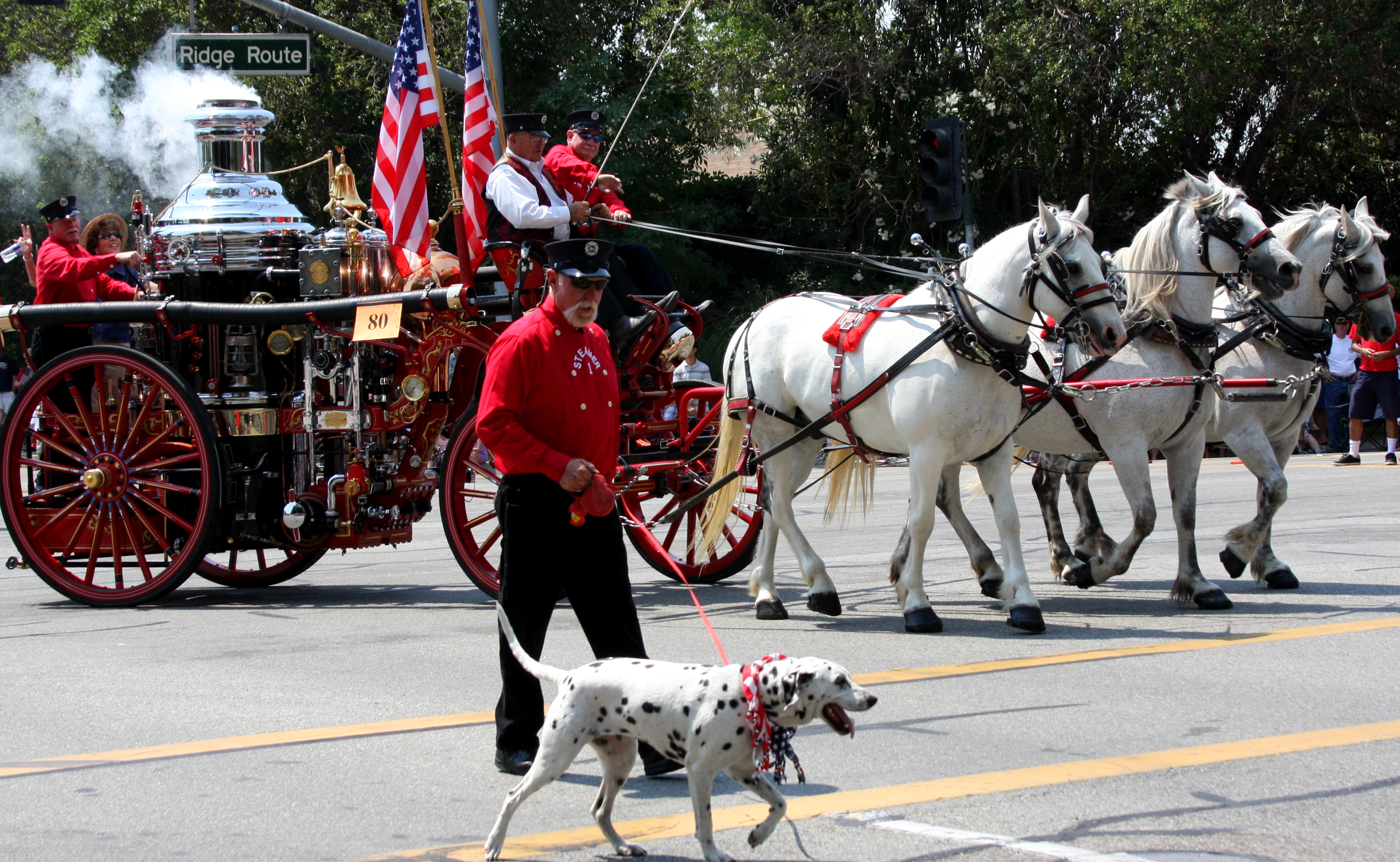
Dalmatian in a fire service parade

Similar to its ancestors, this breed has fulfilled several roles throughout history. Dalmatians were historically used as hunting dogs, and dogs of war, guarding the borders of Dalmatia. To this day, the breed retains a high guarding instinct. Dalmatians possess strong hunting instincts and are an excellent exterminator of rats and vermin. In sporting context, they have been used as bird dogs, trail hounds, retrievers, or in packs for wild boar or stag hunting. Their dramatic markings and intelligence have made them successful circus performers throughout the years.

Dalmatians are known for working for firefighters for their role as firefighting apparatus escorts and firehouse mascots. Since Dalmatians and horses are very compatible, the dogs were easily trained to run in front of the carriages to help clear a path and quickly guide the horses and firefighters to the fires. Dalmatians would also alert the drivers of any upcoming dangers during carriage rides.

== 101 Dalmatians ==
The Dalmatian breed experienced a massive surge in popularity as a result of the 1956 novel The Hundred and One Dalmatians written by British author Dodie Smith, and later due to the two Walt Disney films based on the book. The Disney animated film, released in 1961, later spawned a 1996 live-action remake, 101 Dalmatians, which also received a sequel, 102 Dalmatians in 2000. In 2003, Disney released 101 Dalmatians II: Patch's London Adventure, the official sequel to the original 1961 film. Two animated television series based on the franchise were also created, the first being 101 Dalmatians: The Series (1997–1998), and the second 101 Dalmatian Street (2019–2020).

After the wave of popularity stemming from the films, Dalmatians were abandoned in large numbers by their original owners and left with animal shelters. As a result, Dalmatian rescue organisations sprang up to care for the unwanted dogs and find them new homes. AKC registrations of Dalmatians decreased 90% during the 2000–2010 period.

== See also ==
- List of dog breeds
- Companion dog
- Rajapalayam dog
- Pepper (dog)
