= List of dog crossbreeds =

A group of Labradoodle assistance dogs

This is a list of common dog crossbreeds. These are crossbreed dogs created deliberately by crossing two purebred dogs. Some are known as designer dogs and are bred as companion dogs, often given portmanteau names derived from those of the parent breeds; others are bred to combine specific working qualities inherent in the parent breeds.

== Crossbreeds ==
Name	Picture	Parent breeds and notes
American Staghound		Cross of different sighthound breeds; bred in the United States as hunting dogs.
Beaglier		Cross of a Beagle and a Cavalier King Charles Spaniel; first deliberately bred in the 1990s by designer dog breeders in Australia as a companion dog with the aim of reducing the scent-hunting drive common in Beagles.
Bernedoodle		The bernedoodle, first introduced in 2003, is a cross between a Bernese Mountain Dog and a Poodle.
Cavachon		Cross of a Bichon Frisé and a Cavalier King Charles Spaniel; first bred in North America in 1996.
Cavoodle or Cavapoo		Cross of a Cavalier King Charles Spaniel and a Poodle; first deliberately bred by designer dog breeders in Australia as a companion dog with similar traits to the cockapoo, but in smaller size.
Chipin		Cross of a Chihuahua and a Miniature Pinscher.
Chiweenie		Cross of a Chihuahua and a Dachshund.
Chorkie		Cross of a Chihuahua and a Yorkshire Terrier.
Chug		Cross of a Chihuahua and a Pug.
Cockapoo		Cross of a Cocker Spaniel and a Miniature Poodle; bred as companion dogs. Cocker Spaniels and Poodles have been deliberately crossed by designer dog breeders in the United States from the 1960s onward.
Corgsky		A Siberian Husky-Corgi mix, variously referred to as a "corgsky", "siborgi", or "horgi".
Dorgi		Cross of a Dachshund and a Pembroke Welsh Corgi; they were first bred when one of Queen Elizabeth's Corgis mated with Pipkin, a Dachshund that belonged to Princess Margaret; the Queen found them so appealing that a number of subsequent matings were arranged.
Eurohound		A sled dog bred by crossing the Alaskan husky and any of a number of pointing breeds ("pointers"), but most often the German Shorthair Pointer.
Feist		Cross of a Greyhound or Whippet with some sort of Terrier. Bred in the United States as a squirrel dog or ratter.
Gerberian Shepsky		Cross of a German Shepherd and a Siberian Husky; it has the German Shepherd's upright ears and coat colour and the Siberian Husky's thick coat, marginally wider face and mask.
Goldador		Cross of a Golden Retriever and a Labrador Retriever; examples have been used as guide dogs, search and rescue dogs, and drug detection dogs, as well as companion dogs.
Greyster		Cross of the Greyhound and the German Shorthair Pointer, bred for sled dog racing, especially dryland sports like canicross and bikejoring.
Goldendoodle		Cross of a Golden Retriever and a Poodle. Bred as a companion dog, designer dog breeders in Australia and the United States first started deliberately crossing Golden Retrievers with Standard Poodles in the 1990s as an alternative to the labradoodle.
Jackabee or Jack-A-Bee		Cross of a Jack Russell Terrier and a Beagle.
Jug		Cross of a Jack Russell Terrier and a Pug.
Kangaroo dog		Cross of different sighthound breeds; bred in Australia for hunting ability.
Labradoodle		Cross of a Labrador Retriever and a Poodle; first bred in Australia in the 1980s with the hope of creating a guide dog suitable for blind people that are allergic to dog hair; now a popular companion dog.
Lhasapoo		Cross of a Lhasa Apso and a Poodle; a low shedding breed with chances of inheriting the poodle's hypoallergenic properties. Its coat comes in a wide variety of colours that can be solid or patterned, with white, cream, sable, and black being common.
Longdog		Cross of different sighthound breeds; bred in the British Isles as hunting dogs.
Lurcher		Traditionally a cross of a Collie and a Greyhound, but can be any herding dog (including a Rhodesian Ridgeback) or terrier crossed with a sighthound; bred in the British Isles as hunting dogs.
Mackenzie River husky		Cross of indigenous North American sled dogs and European freighting dogs prized for their ability to haul heavy loads long distances.
Mal-shi		Cross of a Maltese and a Shih Tzu; first deliberately bred by Australian designer dog breeders in the 1990s as companion dogs.
Maltipoo		Cross of a Maltese and a Poodle
Mi-Ki		Mix of Shih Tzu, Maltese, Papillon, Japanese Chin, and Yorkshire Terrier.
Morkie		Cross of a Maltese and a Yorkshire Terrier.
Pekepoo		Cross of a Pekingese and a Poodle.
Pomchi		Cross of a Pomeranian and a Chihuahua, the Pomchi is bred as a small lap dog; height usually ranges from 6 to 9 inches (15.2 to 22.9 cm) and weight 2 to 5 pounds (0.9 to 2.3 kg), it can be any solid colour or parti-colour.
Poochon		Cross of a Poodle and a Bichon Frisé.
Pugese		Cross of a Pug and a Chinese Crested Dog.
Puggle		Cross of a Pug and a beagle. Puggles were first bred as companion dogs in the 1990s in the United States, where they remain very popular; they are typically 13–15 in (33–38 cm) in height and 18–30 lb (8.2–13.6 kg) in weight.
Schnoodle		Cross of a Schnauzer and a Poodle; bred as companion dogs from the 1980s onward, they can be bred from Miniature, Standard or Giant Schnauzers crossed with Toy, Miniature or Standard Poodles, respectively; the offspring vary in size according to the various parent size varieties bred.
Sheepadoodle		Cross of an Old English Sheepdog and a Poodle.
Shih-poo		Cross of a Shih Tzu and a Poodle; bred as a companion dog with the possibility of it inheriting a hypoallergenic coat; height ranges from 9 to 14 inches (23 to 36 cm) and weight from 9 to 16 pounds (4.1 to 7.3 kg).
Springador		Cross of an English Springer Spaniel and a Labrador Retriever, they are often used as gundogs; height ranges from 18 to 22 inches (46 to 56 cm) and weight ranges from 45 to 90 pounds (20 to 41 kg).
Texas Heeler		Cross of an Australian Cattle Dog (a.k.a. Heeler) and either an Australian Shepherd or a Border Collie; bred in the United States for the cross's ability to work cattle.
Westiepoo		Cross of a West Highland White Terrier and a Poodle.
Whoodle		Cross of a Wheaten Terrier and a Poodle.
Yorkiepoo	Yorkiepoo or Yorkipoo	Cross of a Yorkshire Terrier and a Poodle. bred as a companion dog. The Yorkiepoo, despite variations, is one of the smallest poodle crossbreeds produced by designer dog breeders.
Zuchon		Cross of a Shih Tzu and a Bichon Frisé. Bred as a companion dog.

== See also ==
- Dog crossbreed
- List of dog breeds
- Mongrel
