= Kangaroo dog =

Australian type of hunting dog

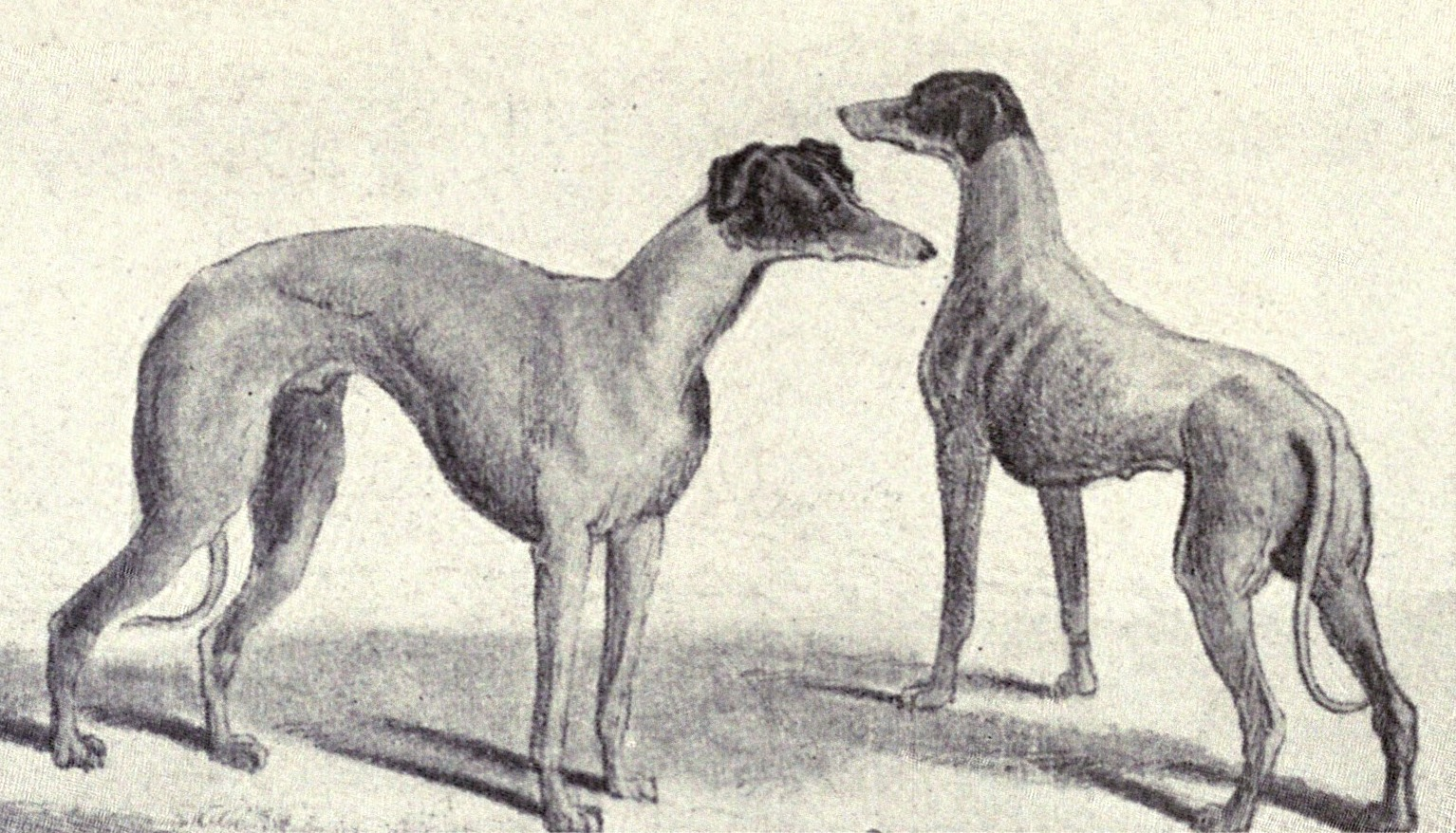
- Kangaroo dog ca. 1915
- Other names: Australian Greyhound; Bush Greyhound; Kangaroo Greyhound; Kangaroo Hound; Staghound; Roo Dog
- Origin: Australia
- Foundation stock: Combination of various sighthound breeds
- Breed status: Not recognised as a breed by any major kennel club.
Traits
- Coat: Smooth-haired or coarse-haired
- Colour: Black, brindle and bicolour common

The Kangaroo Dog, also colloquially known the Roo Dog or the Staghound, was created in the early 1800s from a foundation stock of primarily British colonial sighthounds. The initial breeds included in creating this type were the Greyhound and the Scottish Deerhound. Later accounts include introduction of the Borzoi, Saluki and other breeds.

The Kangaroo Dog is decidedly not a breed, but is instead classified as a type, with populations today primarily remaining in the hands of hunters who wish to preserve the functional utility of the Kangaroo Dog rather than dwell on factors such as standardization or ANKC recognition.

== History ==
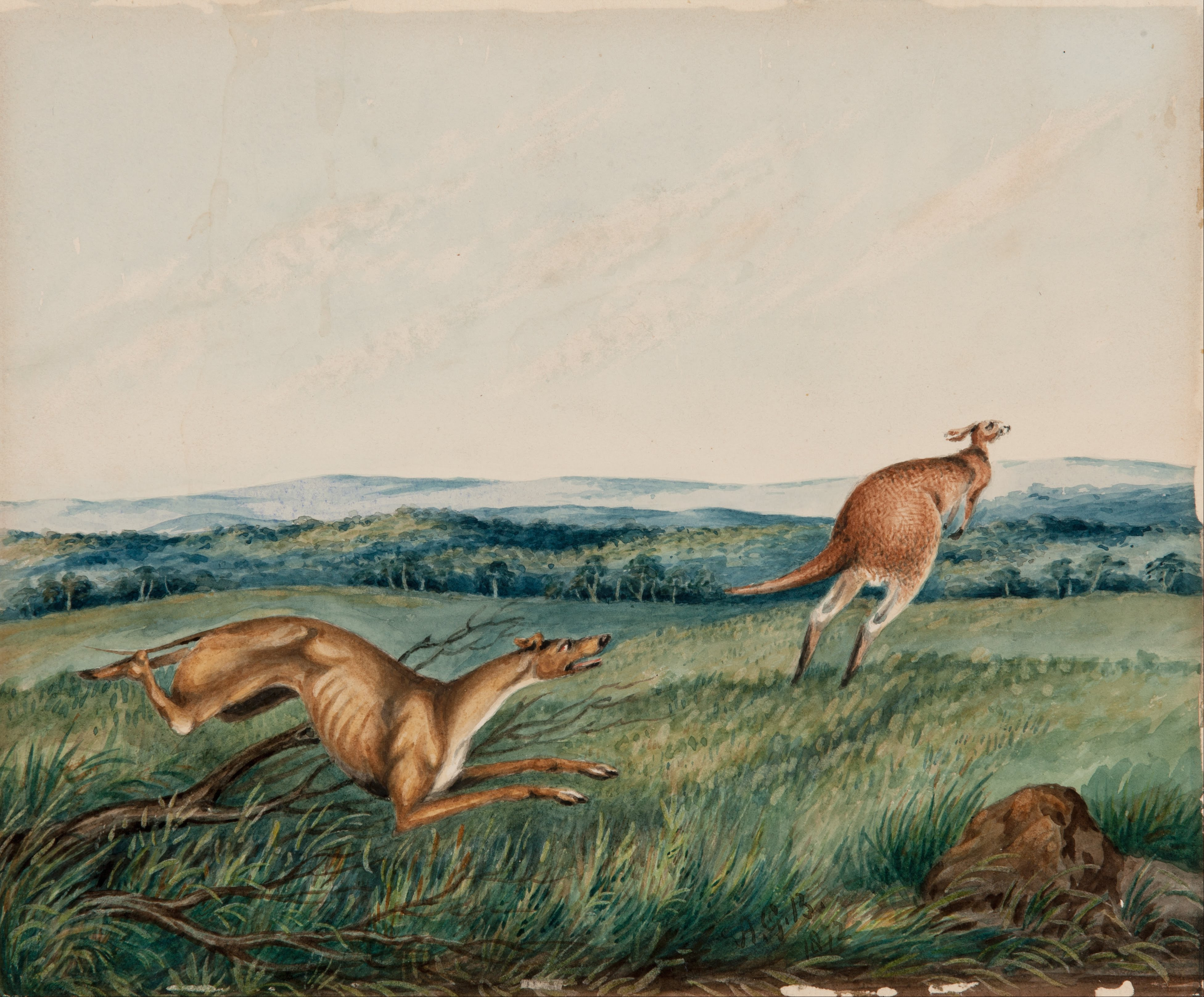
Kangaroo Dogs chasing a Kangaroo

=== Origins ===
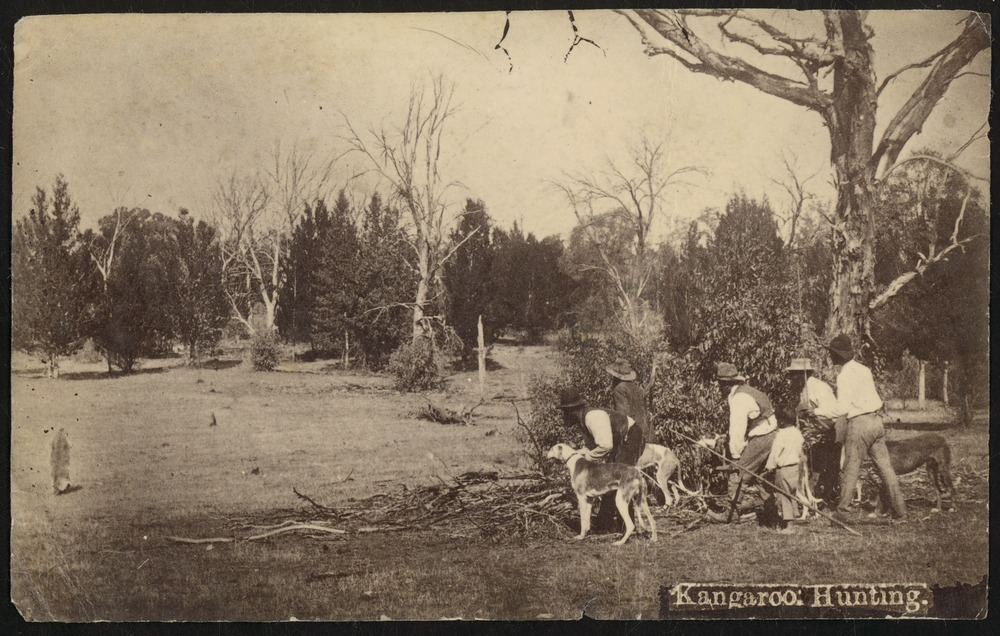
Kangaroo hunting with Roo Dogs, Corranderrk, Victoria (1900)

The Kangaroo Dog has been reportedly part of Australian hunting culture since the beginning of colonization, with early settlers needing a dog that could handle the rigor of hunting in the Australian environment, particularly against kangaroos, who were a major food source for the early settlers. Kangaroos were already wary of both humans and dogs, due to 50,000 years of interactions with Aboriginal peoples and their dingo hunting companions.

Greyhounds and Scottish Deerhounds made up the earliest populations of Kangaroo Dogs, though other breeds were eventually added along the way. Interestingly, the Scottish Deerhound was colloquially known as the Scotch Staghound, not to be confused with the English Staghound, an extinct scenthound.

=== Earliest mentions ===
Some accounts suggest that Darug people had Kangaroo Dogs as early as 1802, while in 1804 colonists sailed Kangaroo Dogs to Lutruwita, Tasmania where they were incorporated into the lives of Indigenous communities. The earliest known print reference to Kangaroo Dogs appear in classified advertisements as early as 1805 in the Sydney Gazette and New South Wales Advertiser.

=== Purpose ===
The goal of breeding the Kangaroo Dog was to create a sighthound fast, strong and robust enough to outrun, catch and hold a kangaroo without being injured or disemboweled by the animal's powerful, clawed hind legs. From the 1830s onward, colonial hunting clubs were established across Australia's colonies, with native kangaroos, wallabies or dingoes pursued by mounted hunters and their kangaroo dogs.

== Appearance ==
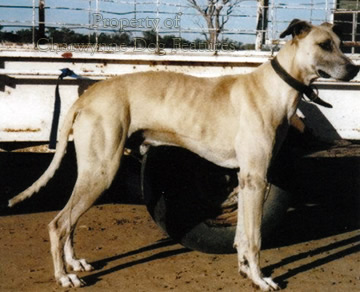
Representative Kangaroo Dog, possessing the typical phenotype expected for a member of the race

Those who continue to keep the Kangaroo Dog today have rejected standardization, and so there is no one correct way for a Kangaroo Dog to look. However, the Kangaroo Dog's form follows function, and continues to represent the sighthound phenotype.

The ABC describes them as "muscly, heavily boned, agile, capable of great endurance — and a bit of an eyesore."

=== Varieties ===
Both contemporary and historical sources indicate that both the terms Kangaroo Dog and Staghound refer interchangeably to the same type-bred sighthound, a crossbreed coming from Greyhound and Scottish Deerhound foundations with other breeds mixed in as needed, in the Australian hunting context with slight differences reflected in phenotype.

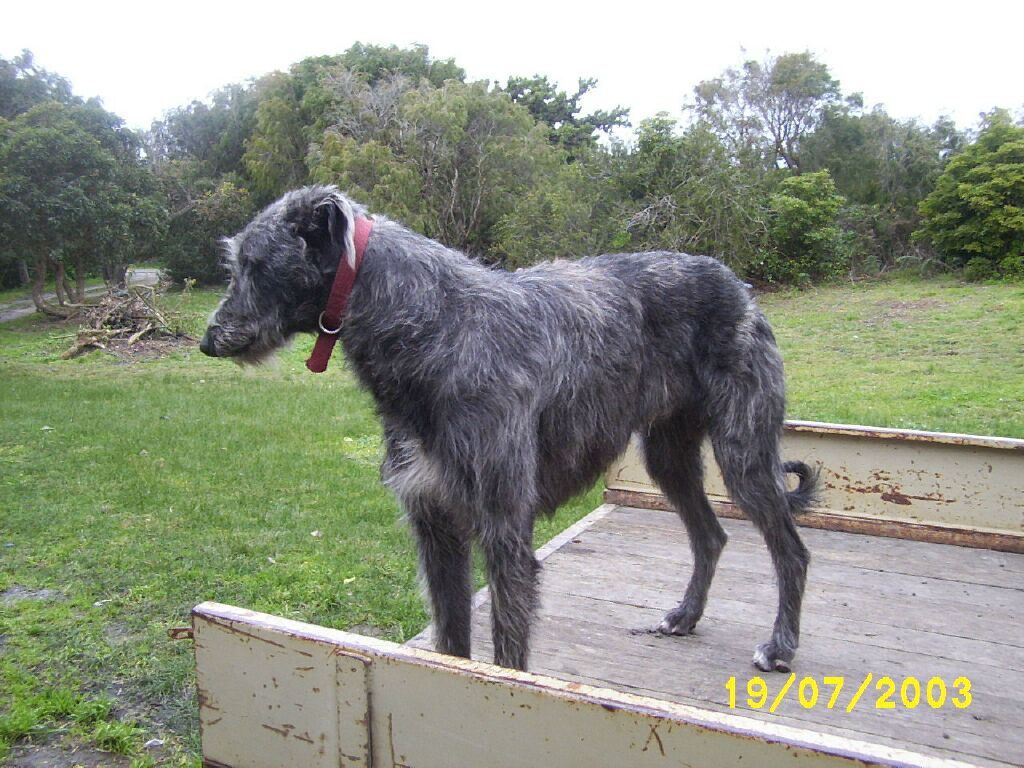
Representative of the Staghound, possessing the typical phenotype expected for a member of the race.

Contemporary pig hunting enthusiast blogs, such as Boardogs.com, write about their experiences hunting with the dogs documenting that the rougher-coated varieties are what are referred to as Staghounds while the smooth-coated varieties retain the name of Kangaroo Dog. Writers at Boardogs.com additionally write that hot and humid climates are not suitable for the rough-coated dog as they tend to overheat quicker than the smooth-coated dog. Staghounds are preferred by hunters of large game, due to the added protection of their rough-coats, and are a common choice for pig hunting. The Kangaroo Dog is preferred in warmer climates, and cautioned against using on larger game, instead promoted as a small game hunter due to their more sensitive coats and slimmer, greyhound-like features.

== Temperament ==
Much like how some sources describe Greyhounds as "couch potatoes", the Kangaroo Dog is described by some owners as "sooks" who sleep about 16 hours a day.

== Use ==
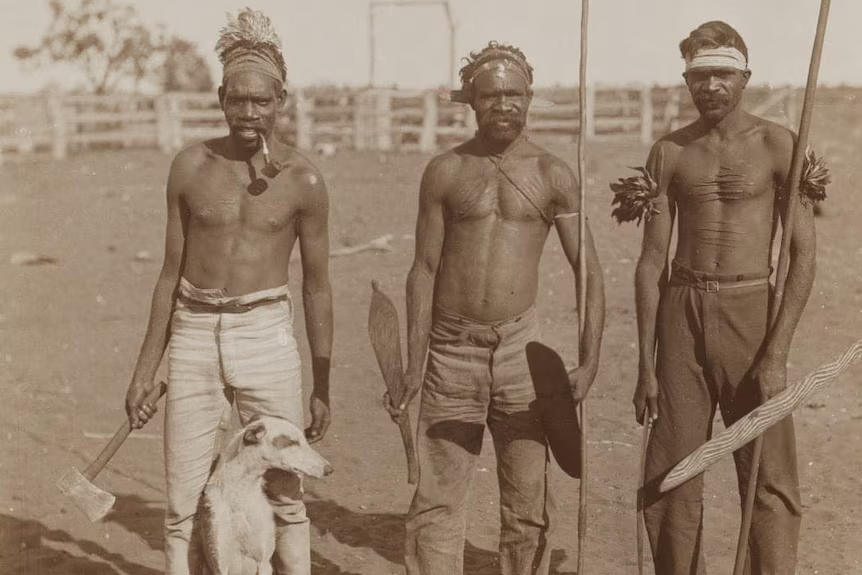
Indigenous Australians with their Kangaroo Dog.

While the type was initially created for kangaroo hunting, it is now strictly illegal to hunt native species with hounds. The Kangaroo Dogs are dwindling in numbers, though still used in pockets of Western Australia and other states for the hunting of invasive pest species such as feral pigs and red foxes.

== In popular culture ==
In 1996, Australian comedian and performer Kevin Bloody Wilson released "Roo Dog", a Christmas parody of "Rudolph the Red-Nosed Reindeer" which directly references the Kangaroo Dog and describes them as "wet-nose crossbreed" and "ugliest dog you've ever seen".

== See also ==
- Longdog
- Lurcher
