= Dog crossbreed =

Type of mixed-breed dog

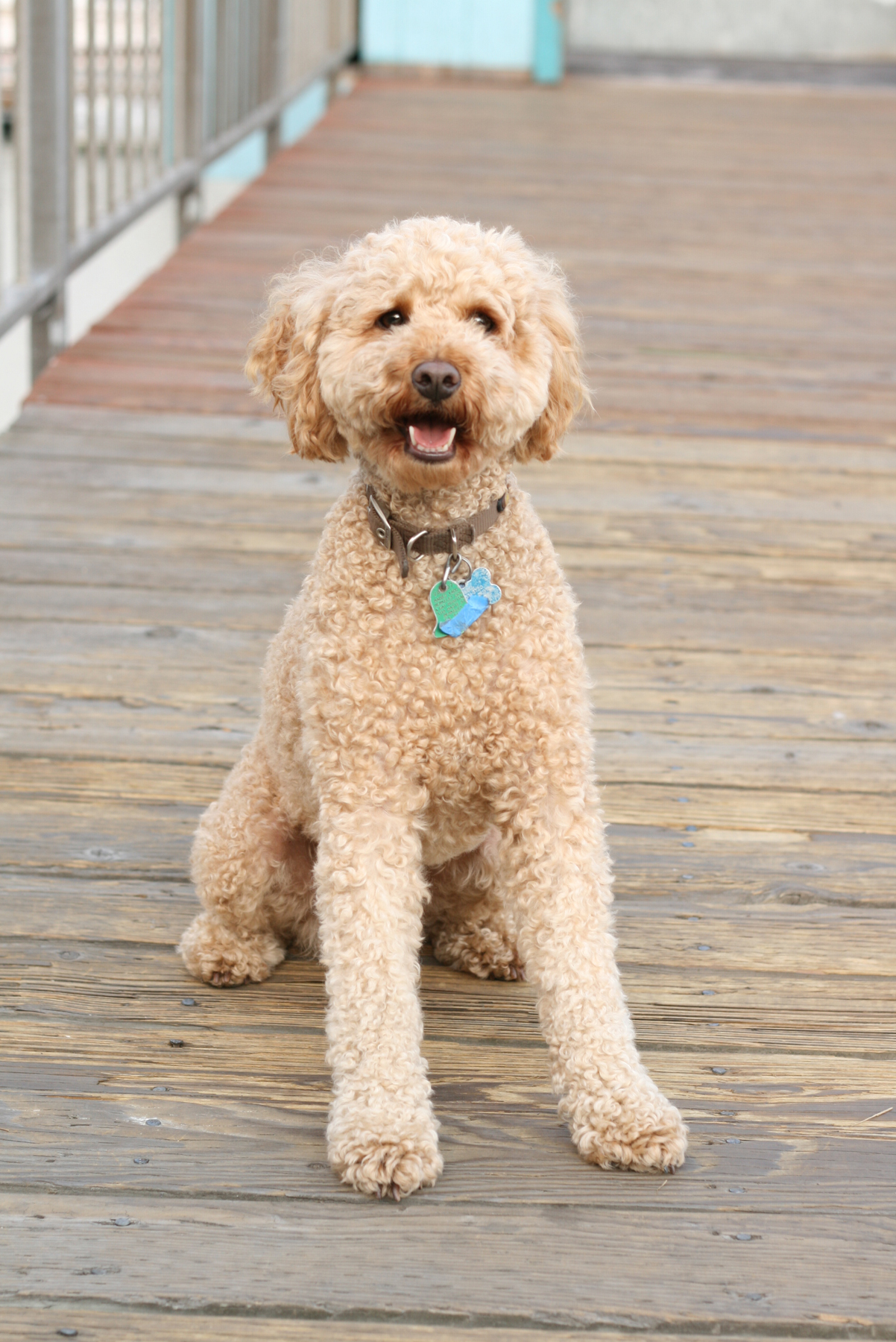
A Labradoodle is bred from a Labrador Retriever and a poodle.

Dog crossbreeds (sometimes called designer dogs) are dogs which have been crossbred or selectively bred from two or more recognized dog breeds. Generally considered a specific type of mixed-breed dog, dog crossbreeds are not recognised as breeds in their own right, and do not necessarily breed true. However, historic crossbreeding has led to established breeds, such as the Cesky Terrier.

Dog crossbreeds are combinations of lineages of the domestic dog; they are distinguished from canid hybrids, which are interspecific crosses between Canis species (wolves, coyotes, jackals, etc.).

== Working crossbreeds ==
Several types of working dog crossbreeds date from the 14th century or earlier, such as the lurcher or the longdog.

Historically, crosses between dogs of different types were more well accepted at a time when modern purebred breeds (based on the eugenics principles) did not yet exist. These types of crosses were performed to aggregate qualities of two different types in the same dog or to perfect an already fixed type of dog, always for working purposes. An example to be cited is the famous case of Lord Orford's Greyhounds, which were improved by adding courage through the crossing with Old English Bulldogs, achieving the desired result after six generations. With the success of Lord Orford's dogs, the practice was adopted by other Greyhound breeders and became more common.

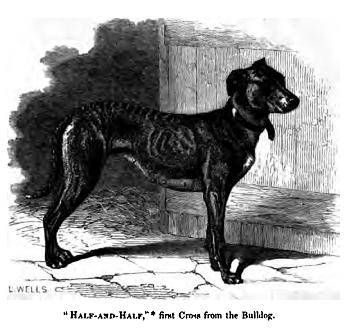
Greyhound/Old English Bulldog first cross

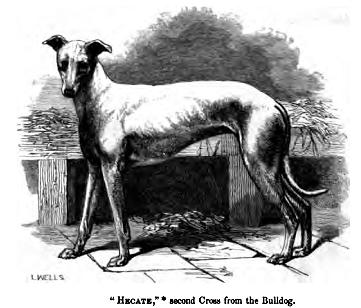
Greyhound/Old English Bulldog second cross

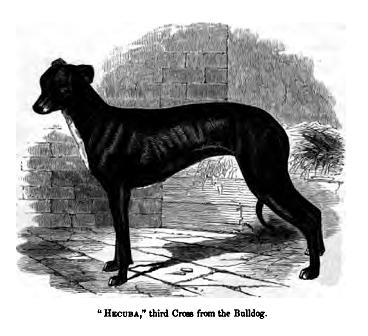
Greyhound/Old English Bulldog third cross

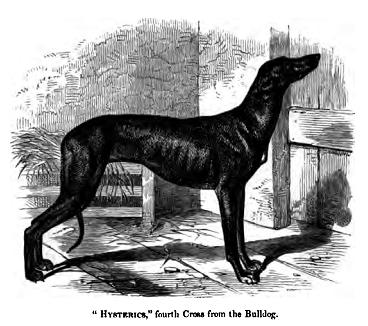
Greyhound/Old English Bulldog fourth cross

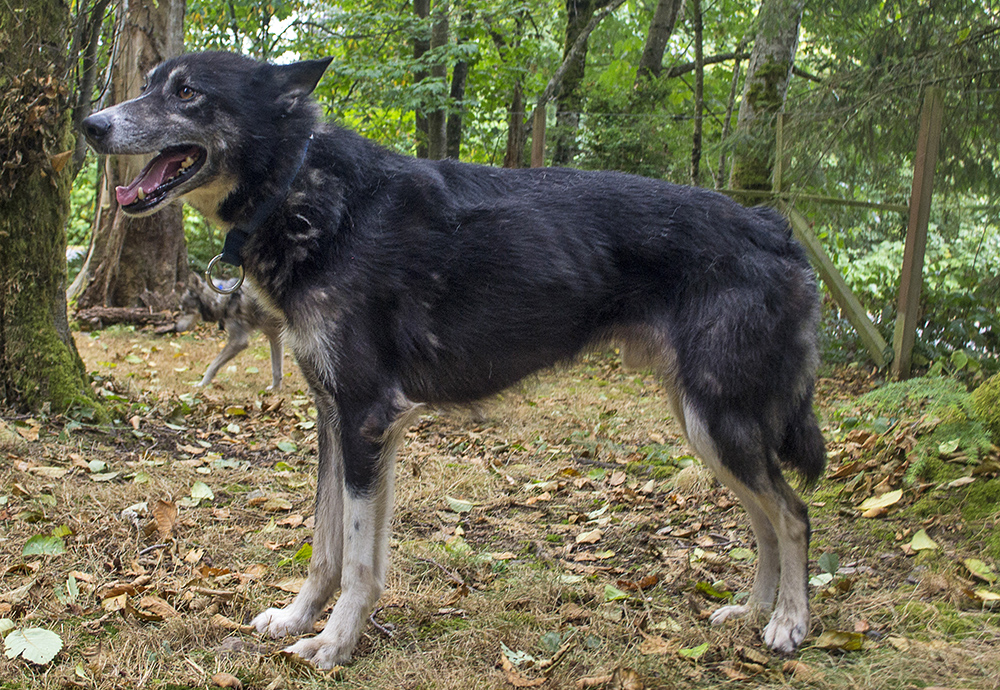
Alaskan husky

Crossbreeding has played a key characteristic in the development of sled dogs with various crossbreeds developing to meet the specific needs of the era and geographical region, including the Mackenzie River husky, in which European breeds were crossed with Native American dogs to produce a powerful and hardy freighting dog in the 19th century, and the Alaskan husky, bred specifically for sled dog racing. In the 1980s, a rise in Nordic-style sled racing in Scandinavia, characterized by shorter distances than typically seen in North American sled racing, led to the development of the eurohound and greyster, crosses utilizing German shorthair pointers with Alaskan huskies and greyhounds, respectively. While the Mackenzie River husky has been largely replaced by mechanized travel, Alaskan huskies continue to be the most commonly used type of dog for competitive sled dog racing today.

Other historical examples are the bull and terrier (Old English Bulldog and terrier cross) and crosses between foxhounds and Old Spanish Pointers that later resulted in the English Pointer.

== Designer dogs ==
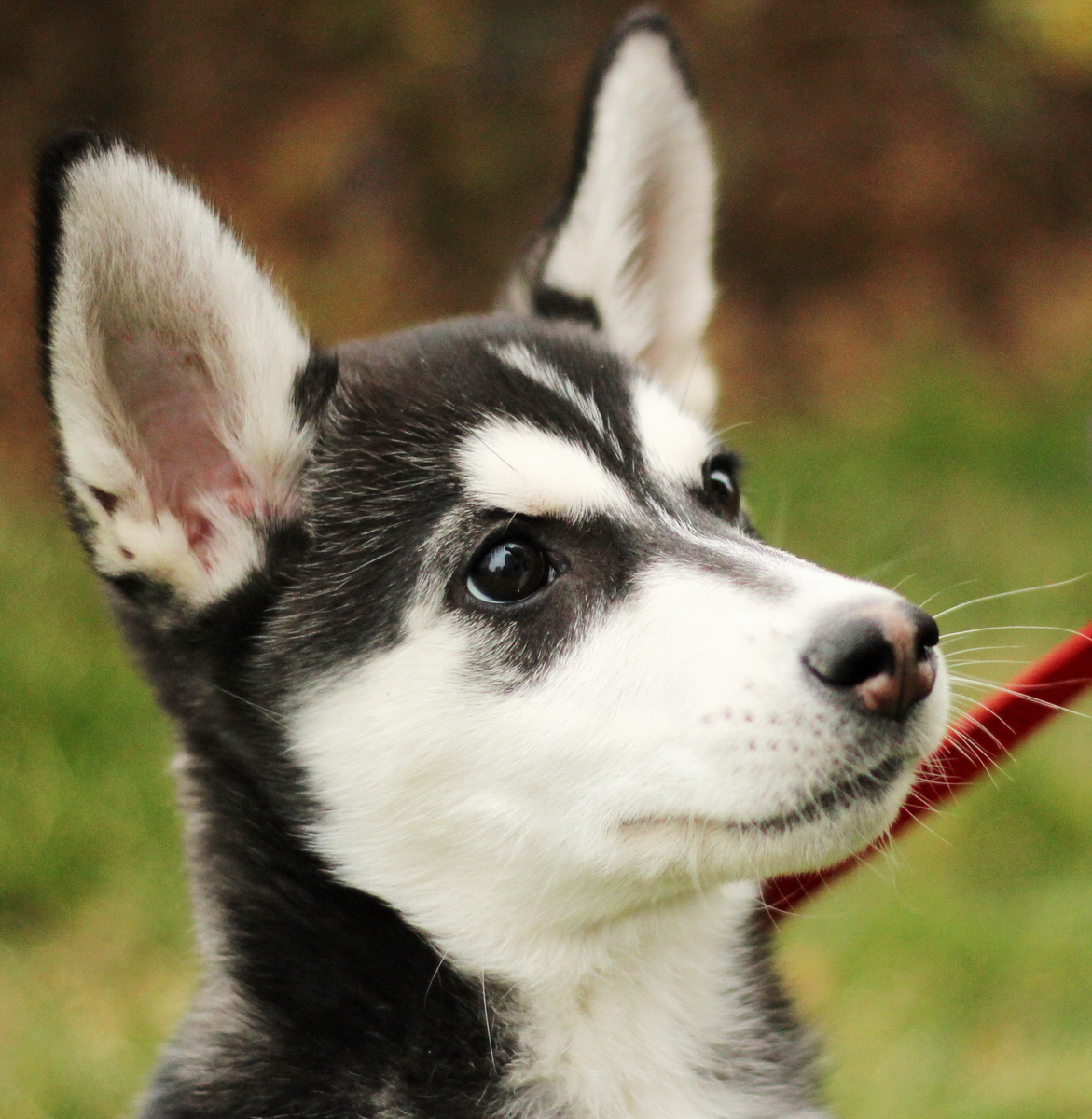
A Huskamute (Siberian Husky–Alaskan Malamute cross) puppy

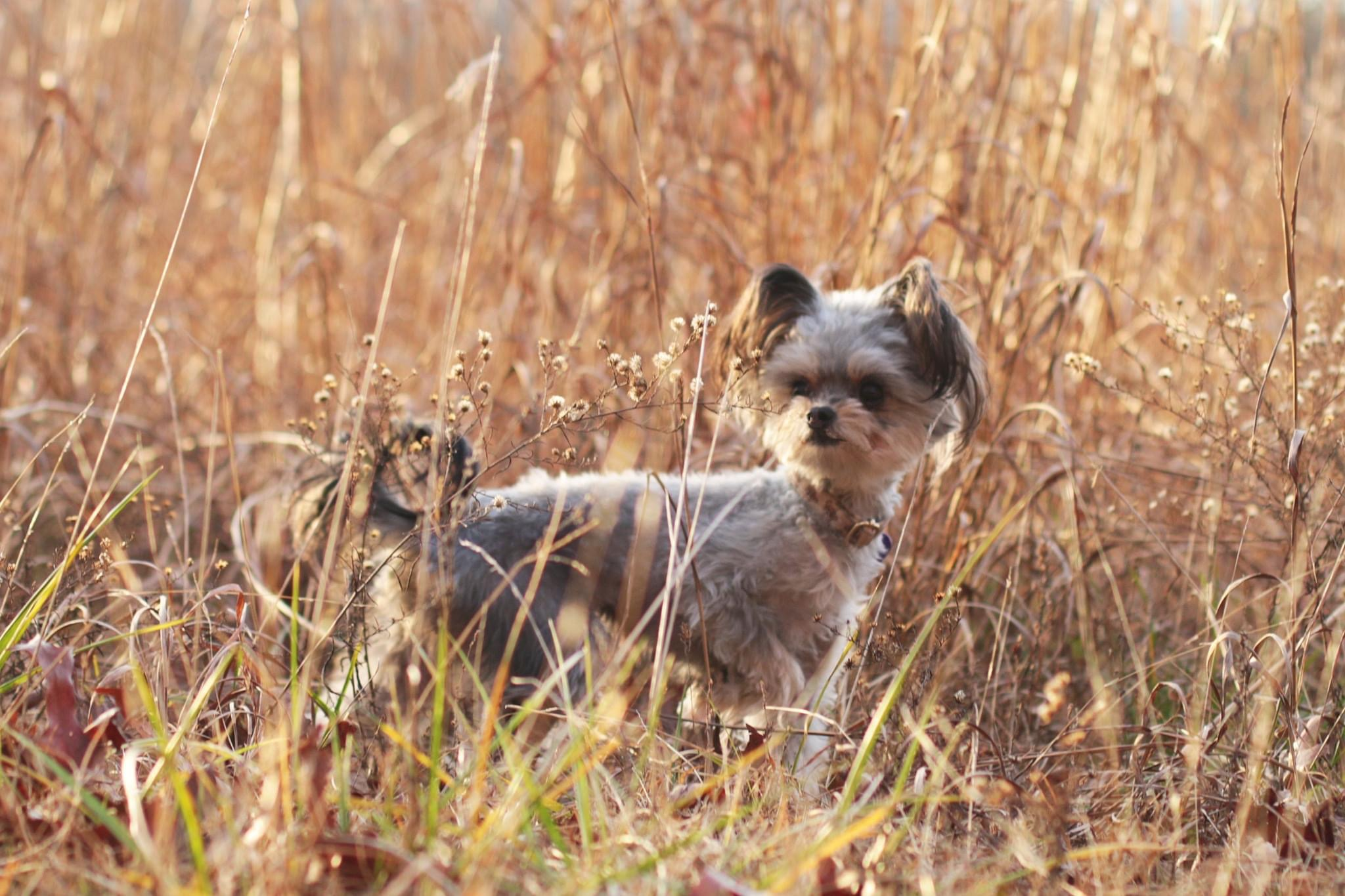
A Chihuahua and Toy Poodle crossbreed, known as a Chi-poo

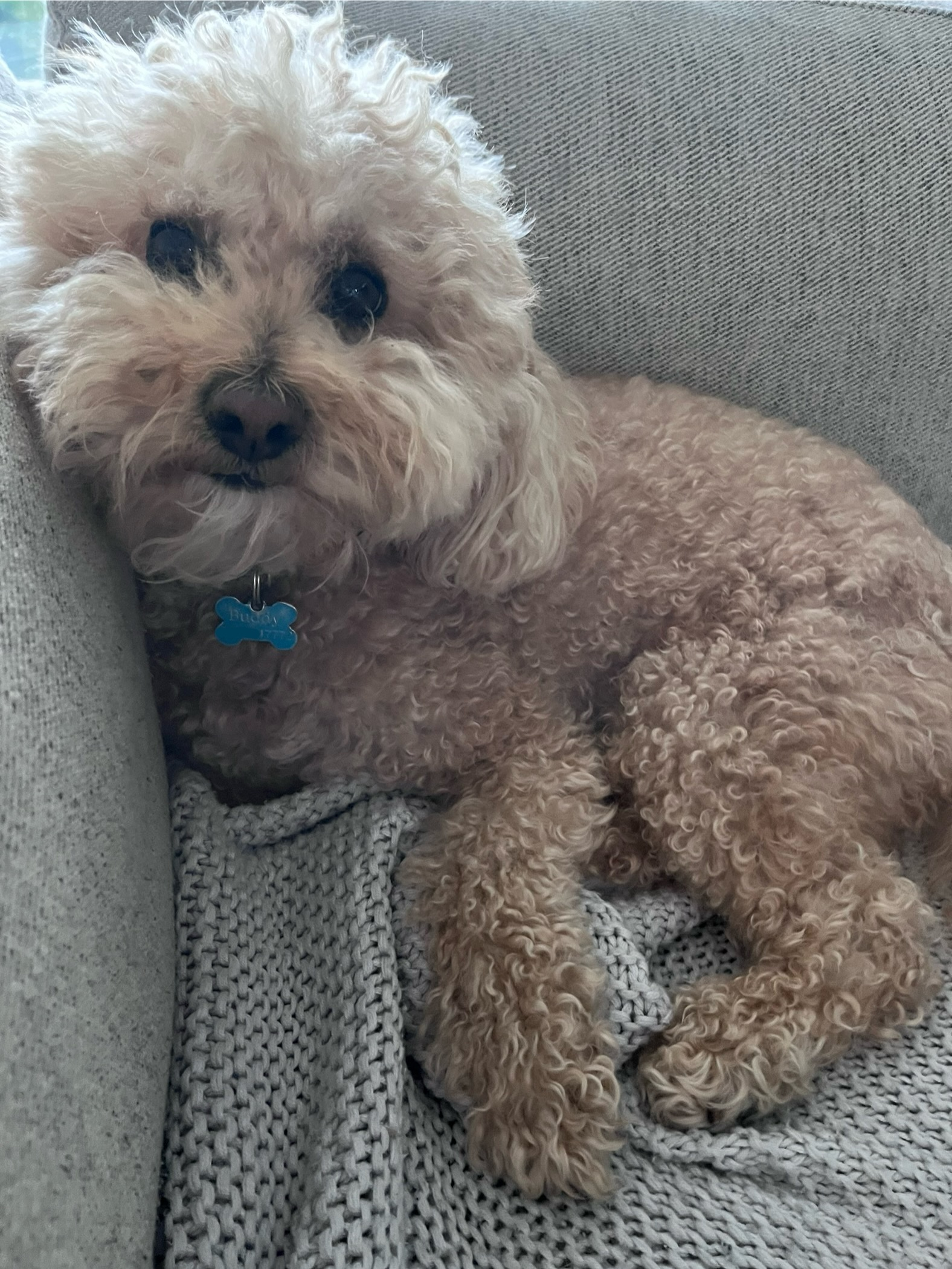
A Toy Poodle-Bichon Frisé crossbreed, known as a Poochon

The Encyclopædia Britannica traces what was the "designer dog" fad to the late 20th century when breeders began to cross purebred Poodles with other purebred breeds to obtain a dog with the Poodle's hypoallergenic coat, along with various desirable characteristics from other breeds.

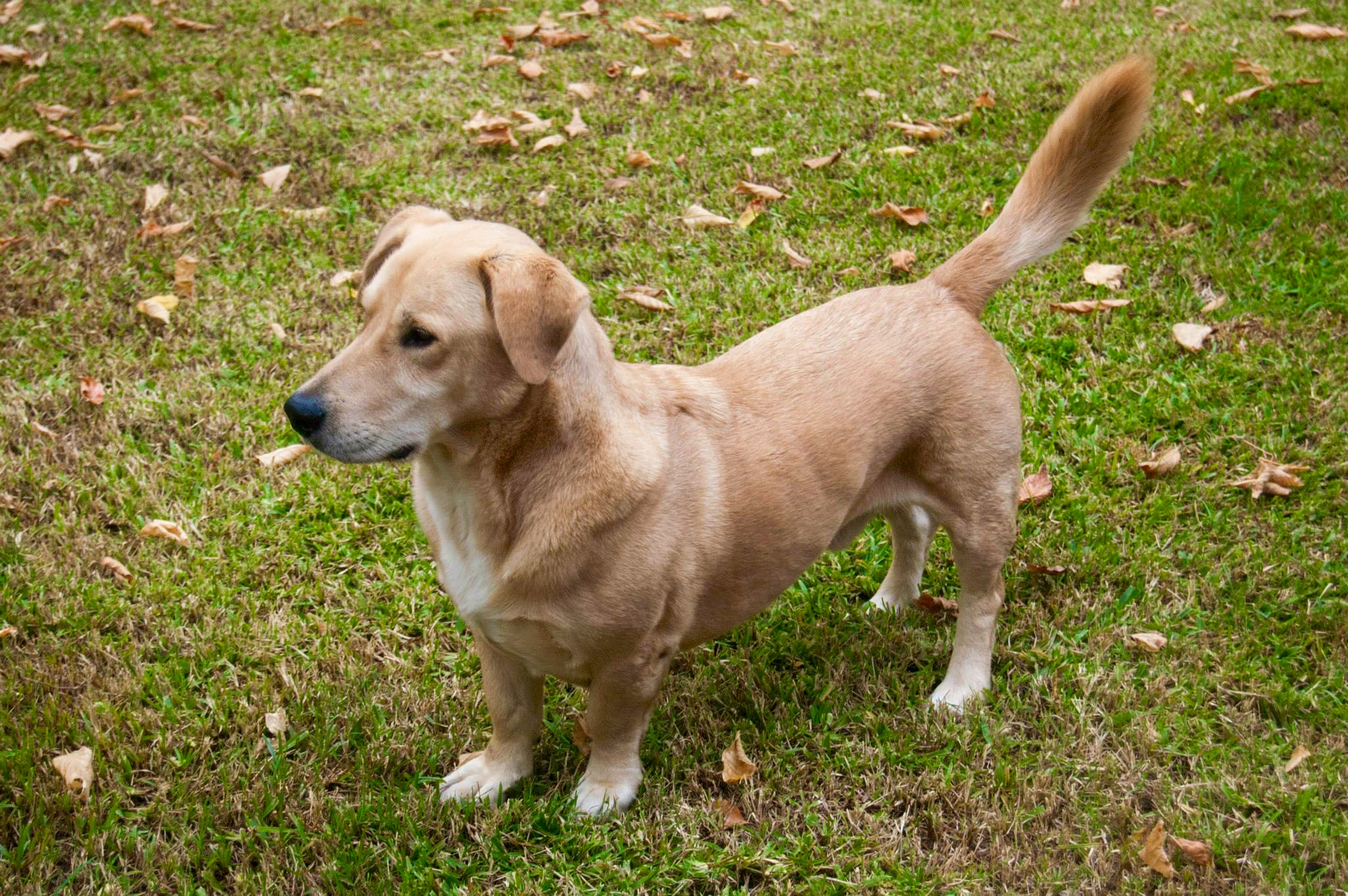
A Bassador (Basset Hound–Labrador Retriever cross)

The resulting puppies are called by a portmanteau word made up of syllables (or sounds) from the breed names of the two purebred parents, such as Schnoodle (Schnauzer and Poodle cross), or Shepsky (German Shepherd Dog/Siberian Husky cross). Other purebred breeds are being crossed to provide designer dogs described with an endless range of created labels, such as the Puggle (Pug and Beagle cross). There are even complex crosses (with multiple breeds in recent ancestry) being labeled in this manner, such as the German Chusky (German Shepherd Dog, Siberian Husky and Chow Chow cross).

Like children in a family, a percentage of designer dogs with the same breed ancestry will look similar to each other, even though crossbreeding does not result in as uniform a phenotype as the breeding of purebreds. Often even pups in the same litter will look quite different.

Another defining characteristic of designer dogs is that they are usually bred as companion dogs and pets. Working and hunting dogs deliberately crossbred for a particular working purpose are not generally given portmanteau names; they are most often referred to by a type name, such as eurohounds (racing sled dogs) or lurchers (hunting dogs). These dogs could be considered only as crossbreeds, not as designer animals, since appearance is not the main reason for them to be bred. An exception to this is the Labradoodle, which although having a portmanteau name, is often used as a Guide or Assistance dog as well as being a popular family dog.

Although designer dogs are often selected by owners for their novelty, reputable breeders sometimes use crossbreeding in an attempt to reduce the incidence of certain hereditary problems found in the purebred dogs, while retaining their more appealing traits. Jon Mooallem, writing in The New York Times, commented, "Given the roughly 350 inherited disorders littering the dog genome, crossing two purebreds and expanding their gene pools can be 'a phenomenally good idea,' according to one canine geneticist—if it is done conscientiously." Crossbreeding has not been well studied in dogs, although it has been for livestock. The heritability of the desired trait being bred for (such as a hypoallergenic coat) needs to be known; "Heritability is the proportion of the measurable difference observed between animals for a given trait that is due to genetics (and can be passed to the next generation)." In addition, the goals of dog crossbreeding may be harder to define than the goals of livestock crossbreeding; good temperament may be harder to define and measure than high calf weight.

Designer dog breeders are often criticized for being more interested in profitable puppy production than in dog health and welfare. Wally Conron, writing in Reader's Digest, comments on the popularity of crosses after his introduction of the Labradoodle: "Were breeders bothering to check their sires and bitches for heredity faults, or were they simply caught up in delivering to hungry customers the next status symbol?"

'Designer dog' puppies sometimes bring higher prices than the purebreds from which they are bred. Fanciers of designer dogs say that all modern dog breeds were created from earlier breeds and types of dogs through the same kind of selective breeding that is used to create designer dogs. Most of the modern breeds have ancestries that include various older dog types and breeds.

== Health and genetic defects ==
Crossbreeding that takes advantage of the increased chance that a recessive detrimental allele will only be inherited from one parent and therefore not expressed in the phenotype of the offspring, is one strategy breeders can use to decrease the incidences of genetic defects.

Some crossbred dogs, created by breeding two purebred dogs of different breeds, may have the advantage of heterosis, or crossbreed vigor. This advantage can be progressively diluted when two crossbreeds are bred in the attempt to create a breed, narrowing the gene pool. The best way to continue taking advantage of crossbreed vigor is from the breeding of dogs of purebred ancestry, as this vigor is typically seen only in the first generation cross of two purebred animals of separate breeds, thus taking advantage of genetic diversity.

Health of crossbred dogs depends on their being descended from healthy parents. However, studies of longevity in dogs have found some advantage for crossbreeds compared to purebred dogs. Crossbred dogs "have a far lower chance of exhibiting the disorders that are common with the parental breeds. Their genetic health will be substantially higher."

Despite commonly believed to be substantially healthier than pedigree dogs, data from clinical records of over 1,000 veterinary hospitals in the US shows the difference in life expectancy between mixed breed dogs and pedigree dogs to be minimal. A review of cemetery data in Japan found that the Shiba Inu had a life expectancy greater than crossbreeds; however crossbreeds still had a higher life expectancy than the average pedigree dog in this study. A Swedish study reviewing over 200,000 dogs registered for a veterinary insurance company in 1995 and 1996 found morbidity to be higher in most pedigrees than mongrels; however several pedigree breeds had a lower morbidity these are in order of highest risk to lowest risk: Drever, Norwegian Buhund, Schillerstövare, Jämthund, Gråhund, Siberian Husky, Karelian Bear Dog, Smaland Hound, Finnish Spitz, and Norrbottenspets. Notably all the breeds are native to the Scandinavian peninsula and are most commonly used as working dogs.

Some health issues not common in either parent breed may be more common in the crossbreed than both of the parent breeds. Prolapsed nictitating membrane gland is a condition more common in the Puggle and Jug than both of the parent breeds, which shows the complexity of genetics and provides evidence against the theory of hybrid vigour. Overall designer dog breeds had lower rates of PNMG.

== Registration and recognition ==
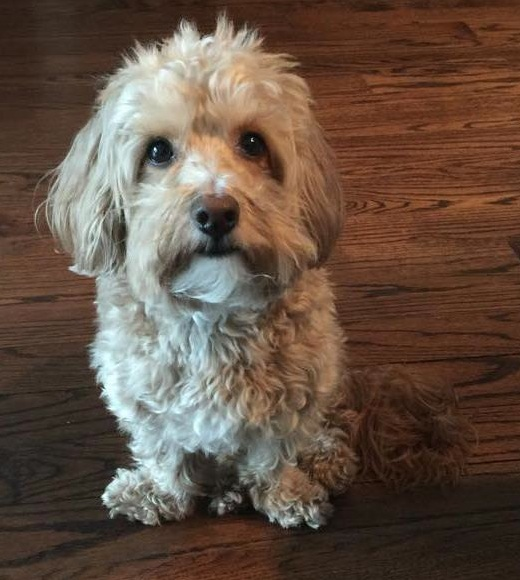
A Westiepoo (West Highland White Terrier–Poodle cross) adult

Crossbreed dogs are not recognized by traditional breed registries, even if both parents are registered purebreds. Breed associations such as the American Kennel Club, the United Kennel Club and the Canadian Kennel Club do not recognise designer crosses as dog breeds.

If crossbred dogs are bred together for some period of time, and their breeding is well documented, they may eventually be considered a new breed of dog by major kennel clubs (an example of a recent crossbreed becoming a breed recognised by all major kennel clubs is the Cesky Terrier). New breeds of dogs must have a breed club that will document the ancestry of any individual member of that breed from the original founding dogs of the breed; when the kennel club that the breed club wishes to join is satisfied that the dogs are pedigreed, they will accept and register the dogs of that breed. Each kennel club has individual rules about how to document a new breed. Some minor registries and internet registry businesses will register dogs as any breed the owner chooses with minimal or no documentation; some even allow the breeder or owner to make up a designer "breed name" for their pet.

== See also ==
- Crossbreed, for any animal
- Dog type
- Feist
- List of dog crossbreeds
- Puppy mill
- Purebred dog
