= Rabbiting =

Sport of hunting rabbits

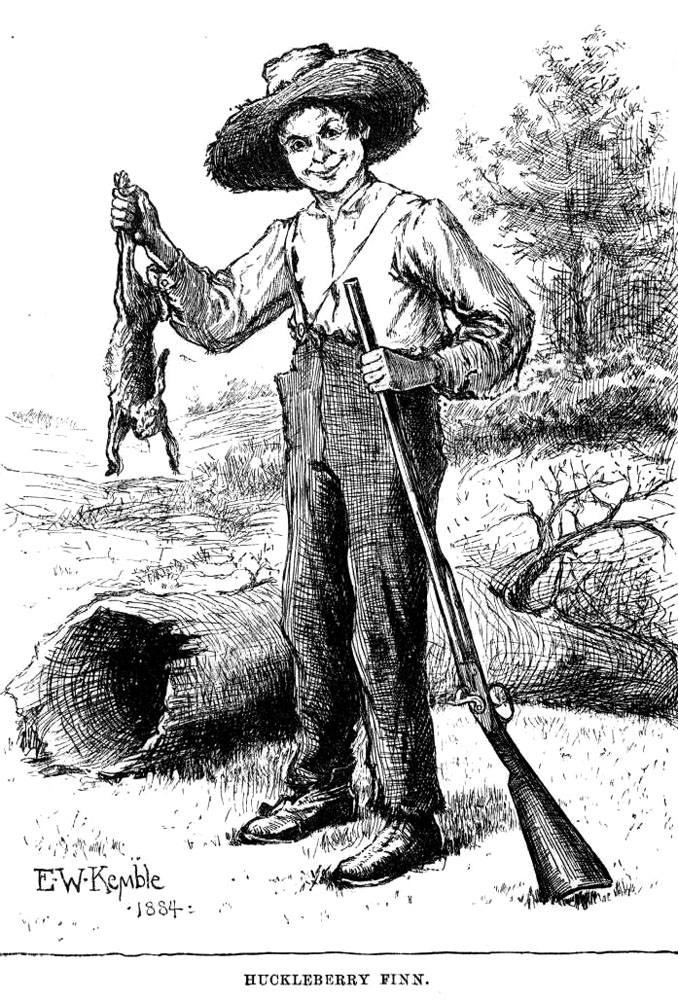
- Huckleberry Finn, illustration by E. W. Kemble from the original 1884 edition of the book by Mark Twain
- Nicknames: rabbit hunting
- First played: medieval times

Rabbiting (also rabbit hunting and cottontail hunting) is the sport of hunting rabbits. It often involves using ferrets or dogs to track or chase the prey. There are various methods used in capturing the rabbit, including trapping and shooting. Depending on where the hunting occurs, there may be licenses required and other rules in regards to methods being used.

== Hunting ==
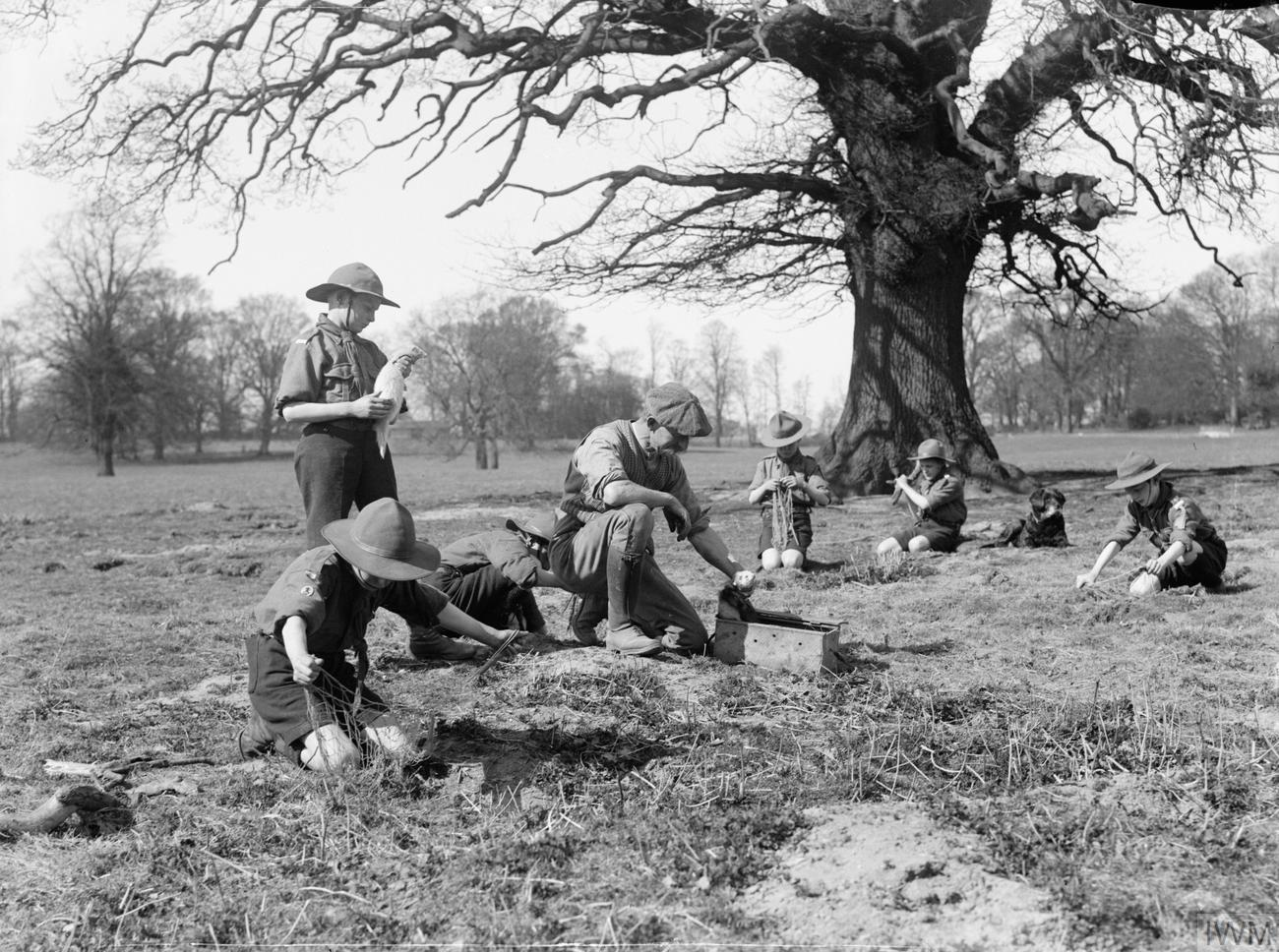
Boy Scouts in the United Kingdom setting rabbit traps with the aid of ferrets during World War I

The primary environment for hunting rabbits consists of forests. This specific habitat is favored by rabbits because of the elevated and soft grounds that make for effortless burrowing and suitable dens. In the United Kingdom, ferrets can be used as hunting companions due to their "natural hunting skills." Depending on the preferred method of the hunter, ferrets can either be trained to flush out a rabbit from its burrow or to down it. In the United States dogs are used as hunting companions due to their natural hunting abilities, as well as illegality of using ferrets for hunting.

Alternatively, hunters can use specialized equipment in lieu of hunting companions. This can consist of shotguns, bolting cages, bulldog rabbiting spades, and purse-nets. As for other hunting methods, hunters can also hunt in groups. With this method, each group member relies on creating noise to trigger the rabbit's flight response. If successful, the fleeing rabbit is usually killed with shotguns or captured with nets. In other instances, with a small caliber, a hunter can also down a rabbit while it remains in its burrow.

=== Ferreting ===
A silverback ferret being used to hunt

Ferrets have an extensive history of being used for rabbiting. Preferences can vary for either males (hobs), or females (jills), due to their supposed strengths and weaknesses. Common belief is that jills are more agile and less head-strong, but physically weaker than hobs, which are generally bigger.

Preferences for a jill or hob depend on the likelihood to perform a lay-up. Upon performing a lay-up, the ferret remains in the burrow and consumes the downed rabbit, usually falling asleep. Ultimately, individuals of this belief may view hobs as being more prone to performing a lay-up due to their head-strong nature. Therefore, some may prefer to use jills to decrease this likelihood. On the other hand, others may prefer to use hobs for their increased strength.

Aside from these theorized strengths and weaknesses of the hob or jill, modern-day ferreting involves technological devices. One of these is the locator collar that a ferret wears so its location can be tracked when it is within rabbit burrows. Simultaneously, the hunter uses a locator that is connected to the ferret's collar to locate the proximity of the ferret's location. The more frequent pulse of the beeps, the closer the hunter is to the precise location of the burrowed ferret. If it is discovered that the ferret has successfully caught and downed a rabbit, the hunter commonly uses a spade to dig up the ferret and caught rabbit. Alternatively, ferrets can also chase rabbits out of their burrows into purse nets or long nets .

Some hunters now rely on firearms or dogs to take the prey, rather than laying down nets. Three or four hunters with shotguns will attempt to shoot the rabbit as it bolts from the burrow while being chased by the ferret.

=== Hunting with hounds ===
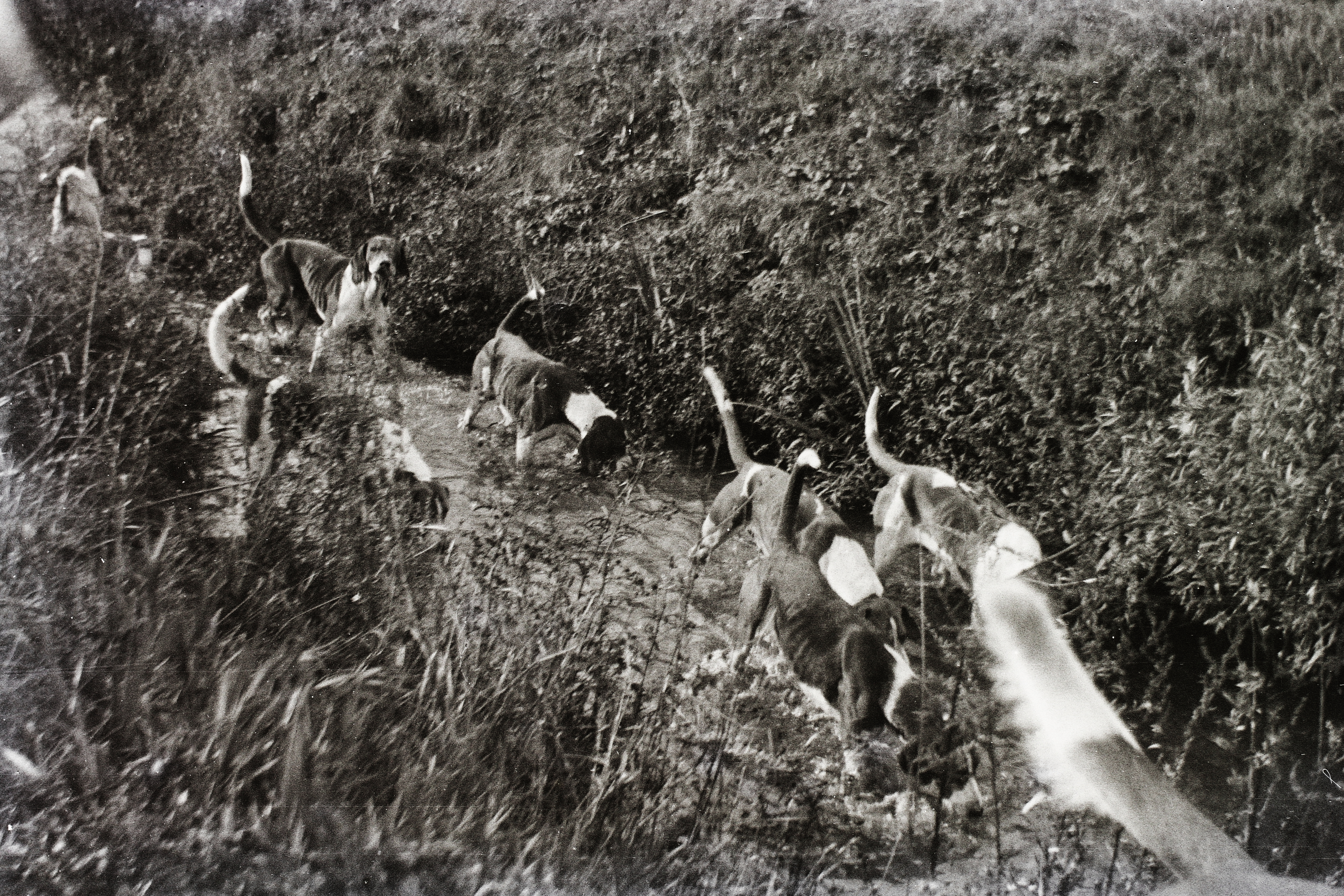
A group of hounds on the hunt

When rabbiting, hunting dogs can be useful in a variety of ways; they can be used to track, flush, or retrieve the animal. The use of hounds for hunting can be dated back to ancient Egyptian times. The most common breeds used for rabbit hunting include sight hounds, lurchers, scent hounds, retrievers, spaniels, settlers, and pointers. Hunting of rabbits involving dogs (usually beagle or Basset Hounds) is called beagling. In the United Kingdom, hunters are allowed to use dogs as long as they don't use more than two and they have the landowner's permission.

=== Spotlighting ===
Spotlighting or lamping can refer to any form of rabbit hunting performed at night with the aid of powerful hand-held, rifle mounted or vehicle mounted search lights. The light is often used in conjunction with a dog such as a sighthound, (or lurcher) alongside an air rifle, or some other firearm such as a .22LR.17 HMR The rabbit is illuminated by the light and then shot, or a dog will chase and capture it. Most often lurchers are used to catch the prey, the most popular crosses involve greyhounds, border collies and salukis.

Using a vehicle is a very popular method of spotlighting. Pick ups and 4×4 are preferred modes of transport. ATVS are also popular vehicles for rabbiting. They provide rapid acceleration making it easy to chase down rabbits.

== Trapping methods ==
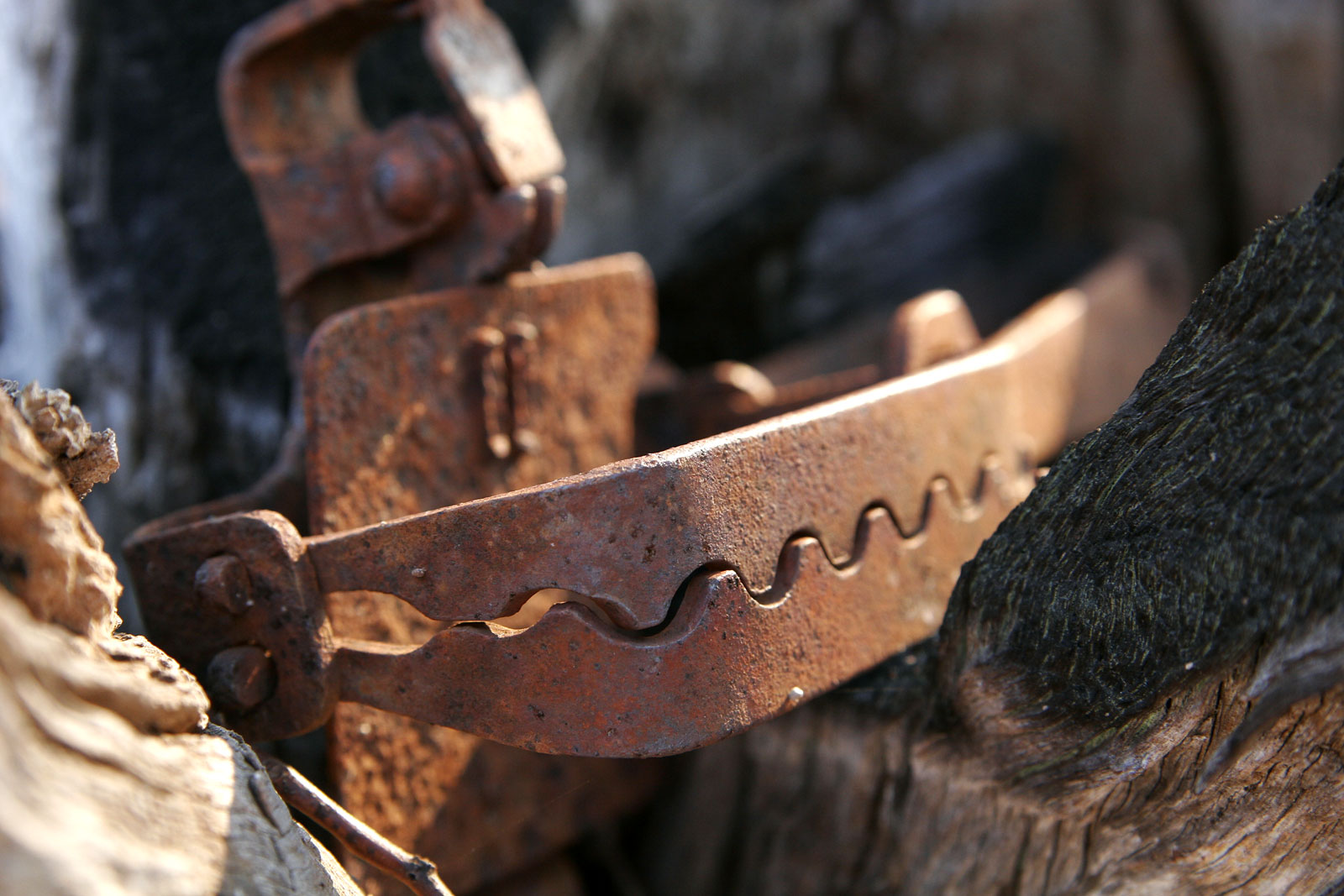
An old rabbit trap

There is a large variety of different traps that are used to capture rabbits and can be divided into categories. A lot of traps are typically used for pest control. When hunting for sport, long netting is the most common method of trapping. Many traps are illegal.

=== Spring based traps ===
These traps have a high rate of success and are very easy to set up. The springs inside the trap are triggered by the weight of the rabbit, causing them to shorten and the door to shut behind the animal, leaving it safely enclosed. Homemade traps such as these do not have a great success rate, as the effectiveness depends entirely on the trap's quality. The way the traps operate vary, but ultimately the rabbit's movement is what triggers them to close.

=== Pit traps ===
These traps are quite advanced because they are able to capture a large number of rabbits and automatically reset themselves. They are buried into the ground and usually have a type of tunnel that lures the animal to a spring-loaded trap, which will then drop the rabbit into an enclosure once it is triggered by weight.

=== Long netting ===
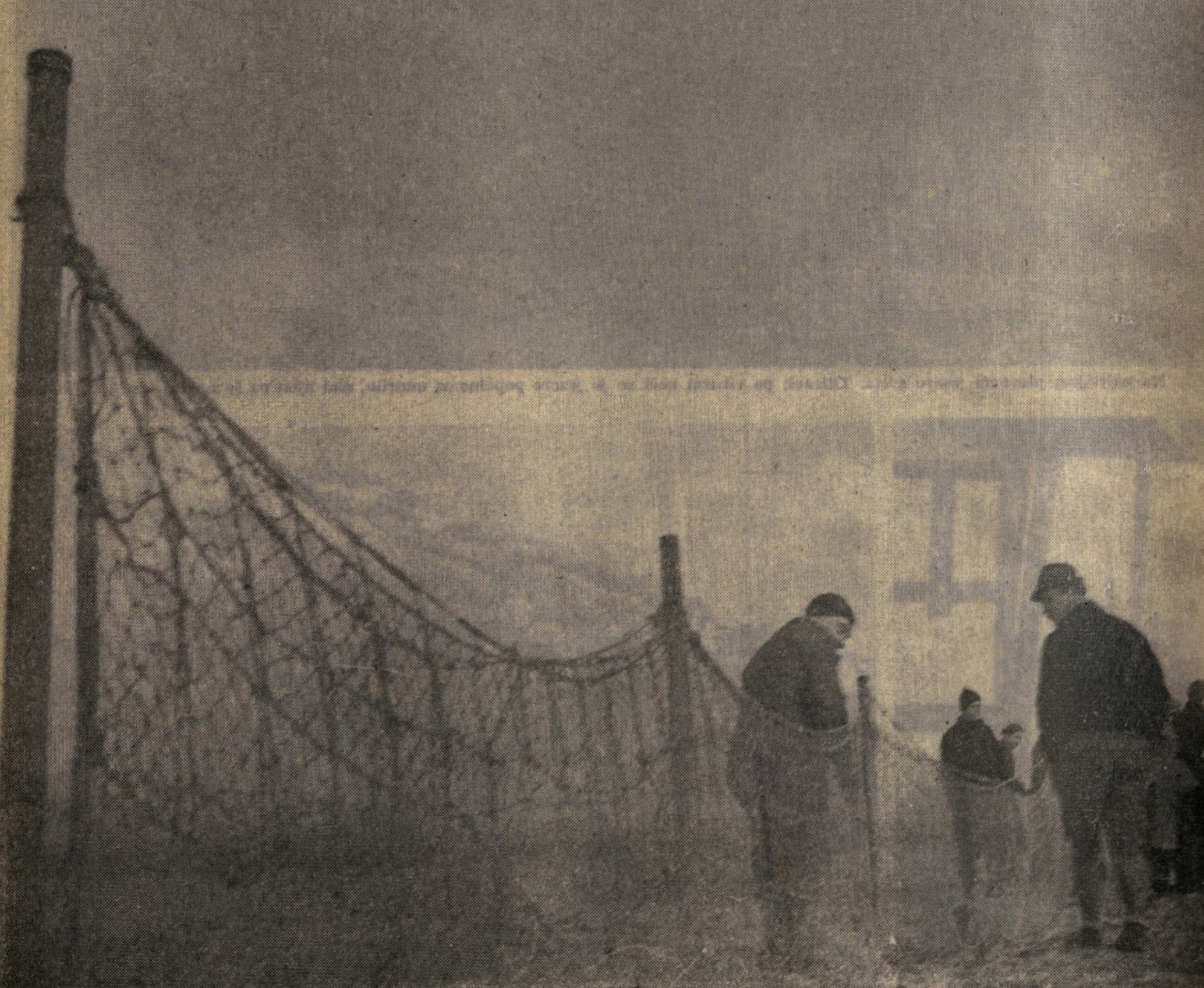
Long net rabbiting in Slovenia, 1962

A long net is used (similar to the purse nets used when ferreting) to catch rabbits that have been scared across a field. Long netting was the primary method of catching farmed rabbits in England before they become a major pest. This method is still used today when ferret or shooting isn't an effective method due to hedgerows or large warrens. There are many different types of nets including the trammel, ditch net, and the quick set. It is important to make sure the correct type and length of net is used for the location and that it is set up correctly. Typically, long nets are placed around burrows so that a bolting rabbit (that is, one leaving its burrow) will become ensnared, allowing the hunter to dispatch it. The act of scaring rabbits towards the net is called flushing and is done by using hunting animals, lamps, ropes, or noise.

=== Purse Nets ===
One of the most commonly used nets is purse nests. These can either be made of nylon or hemp, and range from small to large sizes. Draping the net over the rabbit hole, the hunter then secures the net by pegging its top and bottom loops. Upon dashing into the net, the rabbit triggers its drawstring string mechanism which results in the net pulling together. Afterwards, the hunter usually dispatches the rabbit

== Historic rabbiting ==
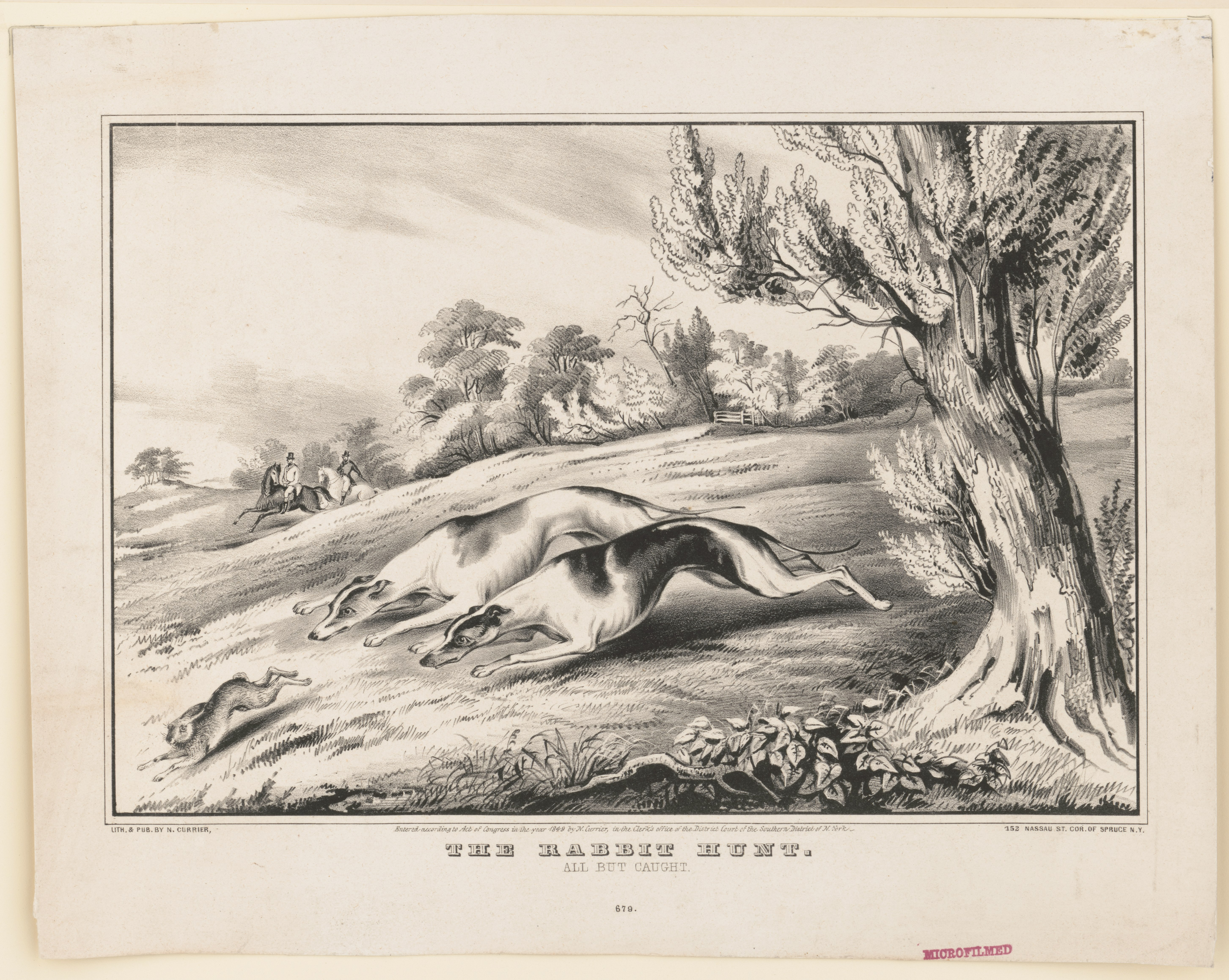
An 1849 depiction of historic coursing

In medieval times, a hawk or falcon would have been used to catch the rabbit as it exited the warren burrow. For this type of hunt, an albino ferret would typically be used, allowing the bird-of-prey to more easily recognize it. While this hunting style is still occasionally used, especially in the UK where it remains popular (see Falconry), the methods above have almost entirely replaced it.

Also around this time, the popularity of hare coursing sport was growing. Back then, two greyhounds would be released at the same time in pursuit of the rabbit and the one that kills it is declared the winner of the game; people typically placed bets on which dog would be the victor.

In sixteenth-century Britain, hunting rabbits typically involved two hunters either on foot or horseback, a group of hounds, and a horn. The hunter leading the hounds used the horn to encourage them to chase after the rabbit, while the other stayed at the back of the group to motivate any dogs that fell behind. When the rabbit was caught, its death would be marked by a ritual dissection of its body following a blow of the horn. After the actual hunt, the meat would be taken home by the hunters, and the leftovers were given to the dogs as a reward. The rabbit's meat was not highly rated during this time period; huntsman still collected the meat, but the hunt was ultimately a form of entertainment.

== Regulations ==
=== United Kingdom ===
In the United Kingdom it is not required for a hunter to have a game license to kill and take rabbits. The hunting season for rabbits runs through the entire year from January 1 to December 31.

On the Isle of Man, a game license is required to shoot rabbits and a dealer's license is required for dealing any type of game; they can be obtained from the Treasury Office. The hunting season also runs throughout the entire year.

In Jersey, no license is required because there is no hunting season for rabbits.

Guernsey's laws require a shotgun or firearm certificate rather than a hunting license.

In most of these places, it is considered an offence to kill any type of game on a Sunday.

=== United States ===
In the United States, every person wishing to hunt must have a state hunting license (few states have exceptions to this). Some national wildlife refuges may have separate permits required. Each state has different hunting seasons for rabbits. In Virginia, the season lasts throughout November, December, and January.
