= American Staghound =

Dog crossbreed

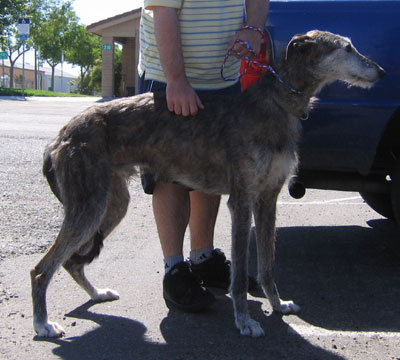
- Other names: Cold-blooded Greyhound, longdog of the prairie and American lurcher
- Origin: United States
- Foundation stock: Greyhound, Scottish Deerhound, Irish Wolfhound & Borzoi
- Breed status: Not recognized as a breed by any major kennel club.
Traits
- Height: 25–33 in (64–84 cm)
- Weight: 65–100 lb (29–45 kg)
- Coat: Usually rough-coated

The American Staghound, referred to by various names including the Cold-Blooded Greyhound, the Longdog of the Prairie and the American Lurcher, is a crossbreed of various sighthounds. It has been bred in the United States from the 19th century where it is used for hunting.

== History ==
As European pioneers moved west into the American frontier in the 19th century, their livestock frequently fell victim to predation from wolves and coyotes, and large sighthounds were found to be the most effective hound variety for hunting these predators. The American staghound developed as a distinctive variety of dog from crossings of various breeds of sighthound found in America at the time, principally the British Greyhound, Scottish Deerhound and Irish Wolfhound, and the Russian Borzoi. In the Wild West the pioneers hunted predators in hunting parties mounted on horseback and accompanied by their staghounds. After settlement these hunts continued as recreational sport but with the reduction in numbers of predators to hunt, frequently deer was also pursued. In recent decades deer has become the primary, if not exclusive, quarry pursued by these dogs.

Different hunters in various regions preferred different crosses, with field performance in local conditions and the quarry pursued being the primary factor in pursuing certain characteristics. Greyhounds, Scottish Deerhounds, Irish Wolfhounds and Borzois have always been the most commonly used foundation stock; other sighthound breeds such as Whippets or Salukis have rarely if ever been used. While some American staghounds have always been and are still bred from pedigree parents, many are bred to each other, resulting in successive generations of staghound ancestry. American staghounds have been known by various names including the "Longdog of the Prairie" and the "American lurcher"; one version is referred to as the "Cold-Blooded Greyhound", these dogs tend to be smooth-coated animals that resemble large Greyhounds, with Greyhounds being the predominant breed in their ancestry and other sighthound blood included to add size.

== Description ==
The American staghound is a large, usually rough-coated, powerfully built variety of sighthound; as a dog crossbreed its appearance can vary markedly, but it usually stands between 25 and 33 inches (64 and 84 cm) in height and weighs between 65 and 100 pounds (29 and 45 kg).

== See also ==
- List of dog crossbreeds
- Feist
- Longdog
- Lurcher
