= Staghound (disambiguation) =

A Staghound is a breed of scent hound bred for hunting stags.

Staghound may also refer to:

== Dogs ==
- American Staghound, a crossbreed sighthound
- Devon and Somerset Staghounds, one of three packs maintained for hunting stag in the UK, the others being the Quantock Staghounds and the Tiverton Staghounds

== Transportation ==
- Stag Hound, 1851 clipper ship, which was briefly the largest ship in the world
- Staghound (armored car), service name for T17 armored car
