= Puggle =

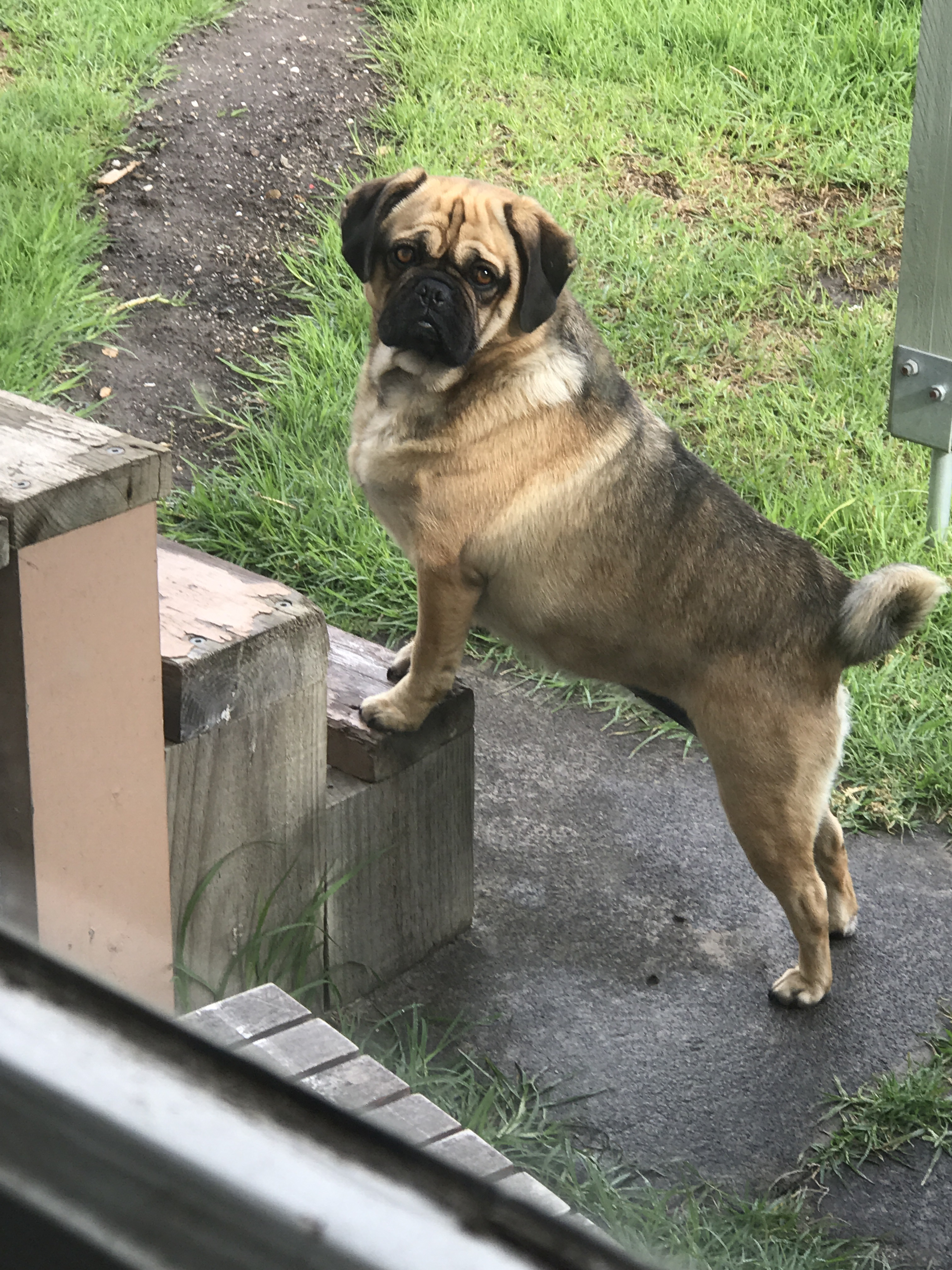
- An adult puggle
- Foundation stock: Beagle and pug
Traits
- Coat: Smooth, short haired
- Color: Shades of tan, red, black, lemon or white

A puggle is a dog crossbred from a pug and a beagle. The breed originated in the 1990s in the United States.

== History ==
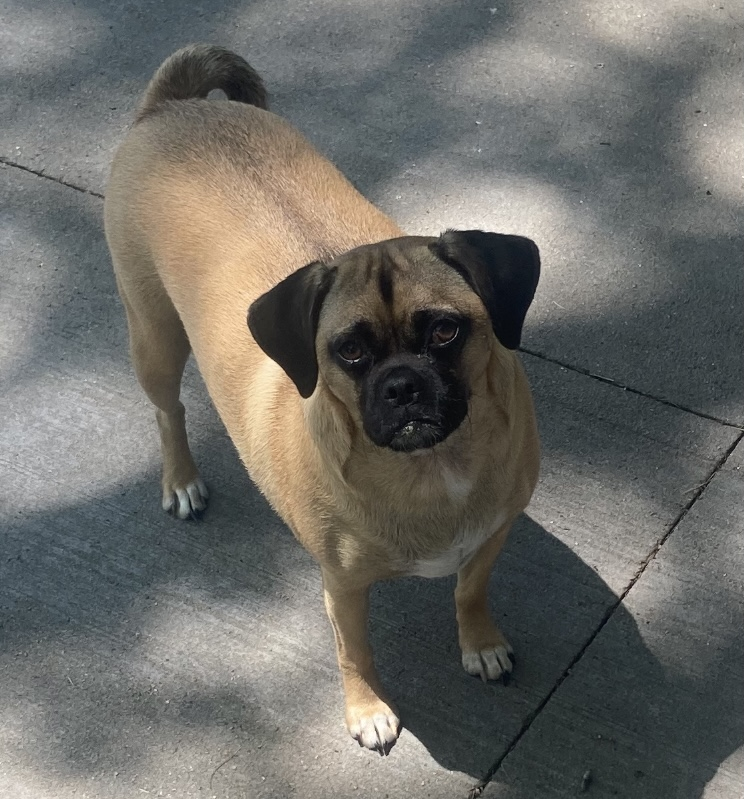
Puggle showing off a mix of pug and beagle traits

The puggle originated from accidental matings. The first planned cross between a pug and a beagle took place in Oklahoma in the 1990s. The portmanteau "puggle" started appearing in 2002. The puggle has subsequently become a popular designer dog crossbreed in the United States, where it has attracted a number of celebrity owners. The puggle was named the "Hottest Dog of 2005" and in 2006, puggle sales accounted for more than 50% of all crossbreed dog sales in that country.

== Characteristics ==
=== Appearance ===
Puggles, being "designer dogs", can often vary in appearance, but usually have the wrinkled forehead, black mask, and curled tail of the pug.

=== Behaviour ===
The puggle is less likely to inherit the energy, scent drive, and howl of the beagle, but because of the unpredictable nature of crossing two established breeds, puggles may still inherit the behaviour of either breed and health issues belonging to either breed.

== Health ==
The puggle usually has a snout longer than the pug which reduces breathing problems and other health issues. Issues common in puggles include eye diseases, luxating patella, hip dysplasia, and Legg–Calvé–Perthes disease. Prolapsed nictitating membrane gland is also common in puggles despite not being prevalent in either pugs or beagles.

== See also ==
- List of dog crossbreeds
- It's Bruno! TV show featuring a puggle
