= Hunting in Australia =

Australia has a population of about 26 million of which there are 640,000 recreational hunters. There are around 6 million legally owned guns in Australia, ranging from airguns to single-shot, bolt-action, pump-action, bows, lever-action or semi-automatic firearms.

== Game mammals ==
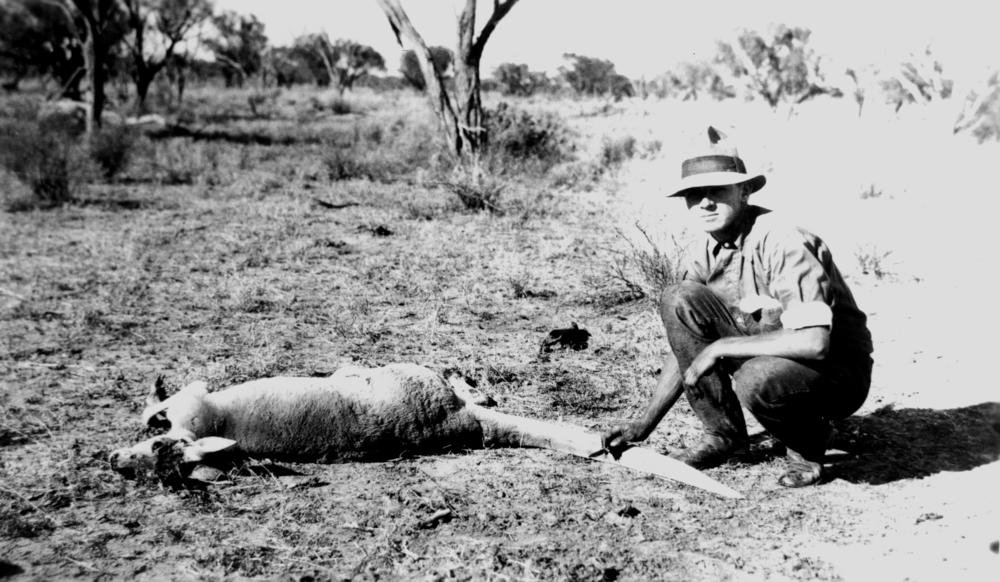
Hunter and kangaroo in Thylungra, 1924.

Many species of mammalian game animals in Australia have been introduced by European settlers since the 18th century. Among these are traditional game species such as deer and red foxes, as well as other feral/invasive species including rabbits/hares, feral cats, feral dogs, feral goats, feral pigs, feral donkeys, feral horses, feral cattle (including banteng), water buffaloes and camels. Some native species such as kangaroos and dingoes are also targeted as part of culling, and the commercial harvest of kangaroos by professional hunters was recorded as 1.6 million in 2012.

The most commonly hunted animals by recreational hunters are rabbits, foxes, ducks, feral pigs, feral cats and feral goats. Hunting of rabbits, in particular, is encouraged across all of Australia, as they are considered a highly invasive pest, and the most common form of hunting is ground shooting.

The recreational hunting of foxes is also commonly done by shooting. However, this usually requires other techniques to lure the animal (e.g. using a fox whistle, which makes a sound mimicking a distressed prey) and then spotlighting the eyeshine to locate and shoot the animal.

Six introduced species of deer can be found in Australia.

- The chital deer (Axis axis) is also known as the Indian spotted deer; they are light to dark brown with permanent white spots which appear as broken lines running along the body. They typically have three tined antlers.
- The hog deer (Axis porcinus) is a close relative of the chital; they range from a uniform dark brown during winter to a rich reddish-brown in summer, at which time light-coloured spots along the sides and on either side of the dark dorsal stripe are visible in individuals. Typically, they have three tined antlers, but extra points are not unheard of.
- The sambar deer (Rusa unicolor) is the largest deer species to be found in Australia. They are normally brown, but individuals of grey to almost black are seen. Typically, they have three tined antlers, but they often sported with a wide variety of styles.
- The rusa deer (Rusa timorensis) is a close relative of the sambar but smaller in size; they are a uniform grey-brown, variable between individuals and season. It typically has three tined antlers.
- The red deer (Cervus elaphus) ranges from a dull brown in winter coat to a rich reddish brown in summer; a permanent straw-coloured rump or caudal patch is retained throughout the year
- The fallow deer (Dama dama) is the most common species of deer in the world. In the summer, they are light to reddish brown with white spots. In the winter, this changes to a greyish brown.

== Game birds ==
Fowling in Australia is only allowed using shotguns with caliber no higher than 12-gauge. Lead shots are considered toxic pollutants and have been prohibited in all states and territories since 2024. Hunting blinds and decoys are allowed, though with usage restrictions, but electronic bird callers and live baits are prohibited. As part of hunting ethics, the hunter must ensure fair chase and need to retrieve and dispatch any downed bird as quickly as possible, either with a follow-up low-power birdshot (known as a "swatter load") or by performing a cervical dislocation.

=== Waterfowl ===
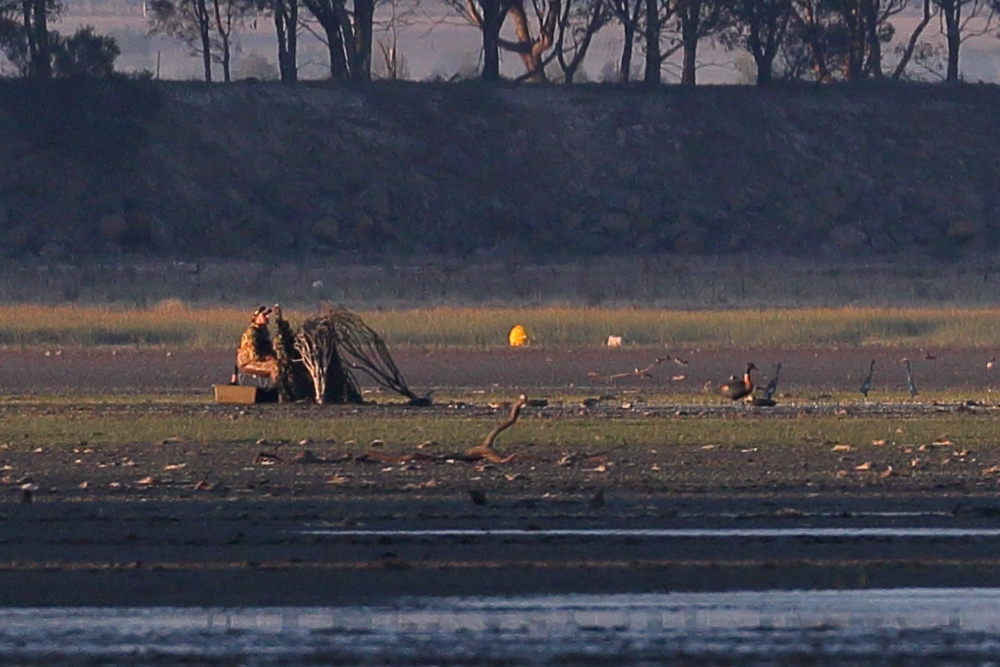
Duck hunting at Lake Burrumbeet using duck decoys.

Only three states (South Australia, Tasmania and Victoria) and one territory (the Northern Territory) permit waterfowl hunting using firearms on public lands, and a hunting permit is typically needed. In addition to the native species, the mallard is a feral introduced species in mainland Australia and is permitted to be hunted. Penalties apply for hunters who kill or injure non-listed species. Waterfowl that are fully protected in all states and territories and therefore must not be shot include: the Cape Barren goose, black swan, freckled duck, blue-billed duck and Burdekin duck.

When hunting with shotguns, there is a risk of injuring instead of instantly killing ducks. As ducks often fly in flocks, there is a potential for multiple ducks to be hit when hunters shoot into the flock to target an individual. The duck struck by the central cluster of the shot typically dies and falls to the ground. However, ducks on the periphery of the shot may still be hit by some pellets, which they survive but result in lifelong suffering. As a rule, hunters are not allowed to shoot into a flock.

A survey conducted in Victoria on hunting four species of native ducks revealed a significant number of injured birds. Some of these birds survive, while others suffer before eventually dying. Approximately 26% of the shot ducks are either wounded or mutilated. Of these, 12% will be wounded and survive, whereas between 14% and 33% will be mutilated. The likely outcome for mutilated birds is a slow, painful death. An X-ray study of ducks caught using nets in Victoria found that between 6% and 19% of the ducks live with embedded shot pellets in their bodies. This animal cruelty has been mostly neglected by government officials.

Waterfowl species permitted to be hunted in Australia (by region)
Common name	Species	Northern Territory	South Australia	Victoria	Tasmania
Chestnut teal	Anas castanea	No	Yes	Yes	Yes
Grey teal	Anas gracilis	Yes	Yes	Yes	Yes
Mallard (introduced species)	Anas platyrhynchos	Yes	Yes	Yes	Yes
Australasian shoveller	Anas rhynchotis	No	No	Yes	No
Pacific black duck	Anas superciliosa	Yes	Yes	Yes	Yes
Magpie goose	Anseranas semipalmata	Yes	No	No	No
Hardhead	Aythya australis	Yes	No	Yes	No
Australian wood duck	Chenonetta jubata	Yes	Yes	Yes	Yes
Wandering whistling duck	Dendrocygna arcuata	Yes	No	No	No
Plumed whistling duck	Dendrocygna eytoni	Yes	No	No	No
Pink-eared duck	Malacorhynchus membranaceus	Yes	Yes	Yes	No
Mountain duck / Australian shelduck	Tadorna tadornoides	No	Yes	Yes	Yes

=== Upland birds ===
Upland hunting of introduced upland game birds are allowed in all states and territories, although limited to game farms and private lands in some places. Common introduced upland birds include California quail, European quail, bobwhite quail, grey partridge, chukar partridge, ring-necked pheasant, Guinea fowl and, in the case of New South Wales, also spotted dove, peafowl and turkey. Out of the native upland bird species, only the stubble quail (in Victoria and South Australia) and brown quail (in Tasmania) are allowed during open seasons, with a bag limit of 20 kills.

== Legislation ==
Laws related to hunting vary between each state or territory. Except where otherwise stated, most states and territories allow the hunting of pest species – feral dogs, feral goats, feral pigs, foxes, hares, and rabbits – at any time of year with the landowner's permission. Every state and territory requires those carrying firearms to be licensed to do so. A survey of recreational hunters identified the following usage rates of particular hunting methods: 92% rifles, 16% bow and arrows, 3% black powder muzzleloaders, 56% shotguns, 9% dogs only and 3% others.

=== Australian Capital Territory ===
All that is required to hunt in Australian Capital Territory is a valid firearms licence. Individuals between the ages of 12 – 17 can hold a minor's firearms licence, allowing them to hunt under adult supervision. However, hunting is restricted to pest animals on private property and may only be carried out with the landowner's permission.

=== New South Wales ===
New South Wales allows the hunting of deer. In NSW game species include ducks, which may be hunted under the New South Wales Game Bird Management Program, as well as wild deer, California quails, partridges, pheasants, peafowl and turkeys. Dogs, cats and hares are classified as both feral and game.

=== Northern Territory ===
The Northern Territory freely allows the hunting of feral animals on private land with the landowner's permission as long as the hunter holds a valid firearms licence. This excepts feral pigs and waterfowl, for which a permit is required to hunt on certain reserves. The Northern Territory considers many animals to be feral: Arabian camels, buffaloes, banteng, cane toads, donkeys, feral cats, horses, wild dogs, feral cattle, house sparrows, pigeons, sambar deer, rusa deer, chital and turtle doves. All waterfowl hunters require a permit to hunt and may only do so during the declared open season. Waterfowl includes the following species: magpie geese, Pacific black duck, wandering whistling duck, plumed whistling duck, grey teal, pink-eared duck, hardhead duck, maned duck.

=== Queensland ===
In Queensland, some native species (with a permit) and all pest species may be hunted at any time of the year with the landowner's permission. A weapons licence is required to carry firearms. No species are declared as game animals, but many animals are declared pests in Queensland instead. Species commonly hunted include red deer, chital, fallow deer, rusa, dingo, feral dog, rabbits, hares, cats, foxes, goats, pigs, dogs, donkeys, horses and feral cattle.

=== South Australia ===
South Australia allows the hunting of game species during open season. Species listed as game are the stubble quail, Pacific black duck, grey teal, chestnut teal, Australian shelduck, pink-eared duck and maned duck. Some native species and all introduced species may be hunted at any time of the year. Namely camels, deer, starling, domestic pigeon, European blackbird and the spotted turtle-dove.

=== Tasmania ===
A game licence is required to hunt in Tasmania, pests and feral creatures are eligible to be hunted on private, state and crown land. Tasmania classifies as game species: deer, wild duck, brown quail and pheasant. For non-commercial purposes, muttonbirds and wallabies may also be hunted. Pests can be hunted on crown land at any time, however on private and state land hunts are only carried out with explicit permission from the owner of the private land. Minor permits in both firearms and hunting can be applied for if under the age of 18 years. There are two different grades of minor permits available from 12 years.

=== Victoria ===
Hunting of game species is allowed during open seasons under a state licence scheme. In Victoria, state licenses are issued to: 26,200 duck hunters, 29,000 quail hunters, and 32,000 deer hunters.

Victoria allows the hunting of many native and introduced species, including stubble quail, pheasants, partridges, European quail, California quail, Pacific black duck, grey teal, hardhead, Australian shelduck, pink-eared duck, Australian wood duck, chestnut teal, Australasian shoveller, hog deer, red deer, sambar deer and fallow deer.

Victoria makes no restrictions on the hunting of pest or feral animals in state forests, or on private lands as long as the hunter has permission from the landowner. Rabbits, foxes and feral dogs are classified as pests, and can be hunted at any time throughout the year.

=== Western Australia ===
In Western Australia, only feral species may be hunted on private land with the landowner's permission, subject to holding a valid firearms licence. These species include camels, donkeys, feral cattle, wood ducks, feral dogs, feral horse, hares and starling.

== Aboriginal hunting ==
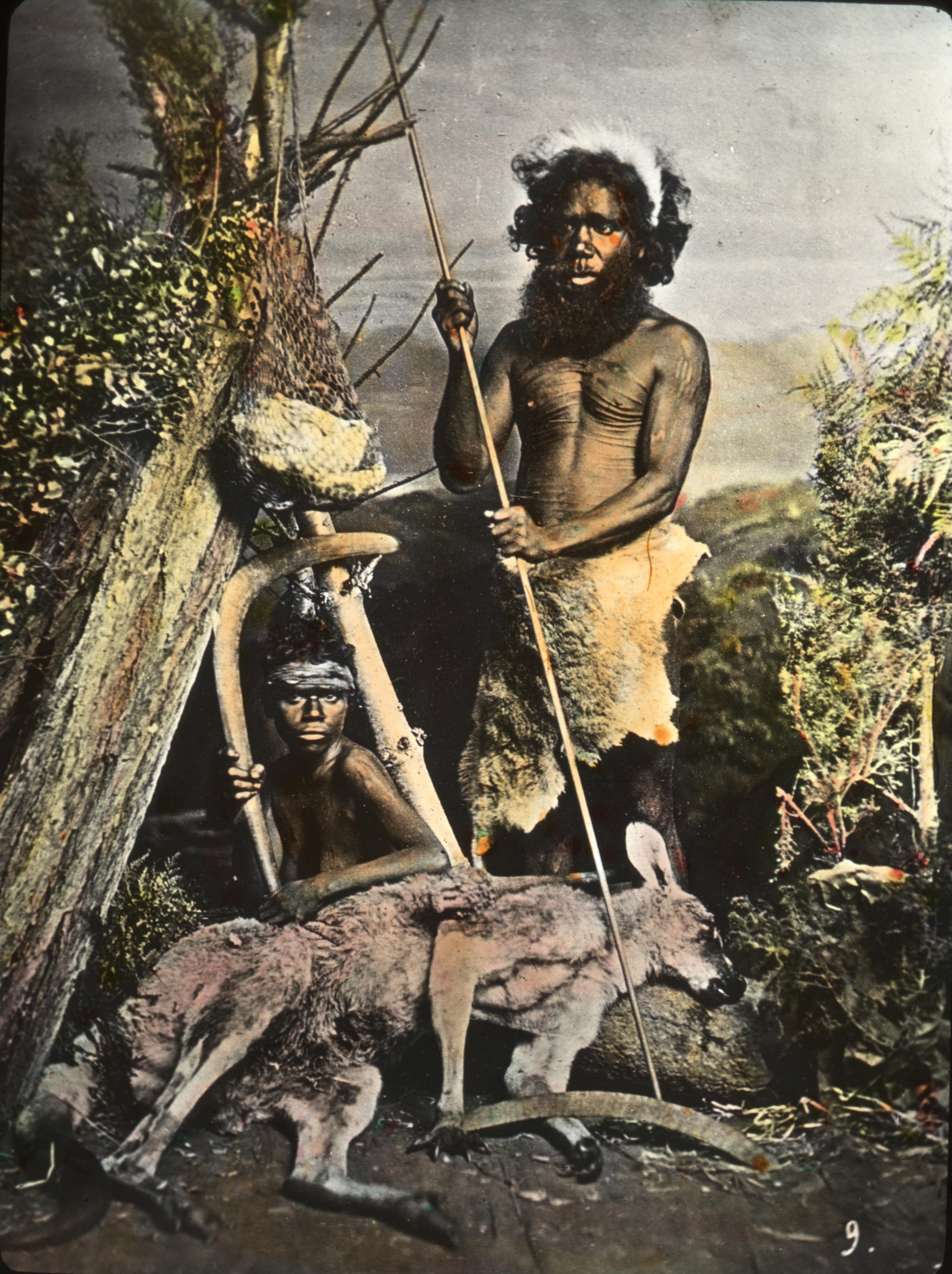
An Aboriginal and a wallaby, 1901.

Aboriginal Australians lived on the Australian continent for thousands of years before Europeans settlement in the late 1700s. They had a wealth of animals to hunt and had very refined and sometimes ingenious ways of hunting them.

=== Hunting techniques ===
Boomerangs have been used as a hunting tool by Aboriginal Peoples for tens of thousands of years. The way a hunter tends to use a boomerang is to rustle tree branches, causing the birds inside to be startled and fly into nets that the hunter had already set up between trees. Contrary to popular belief, Aboriginal hunting boomerangs are not designed to return to the thrower. Related to the boomerang, a throwing stick is bigger and heavier. These heftier weapons are used to hunt bigger animals such as kangaroos. They were thrown straight at their target and could even break bones on impact. This made it a lethal tool in the hands of an experienced hunter. Aboriginals use fire to clear vegetation from patches of land to make it easier to hunt game. Among the animals hunted are monitor lizards.

=== Legal framework ===
The National Parks and Wildlife Conservation Act 1975 (Cth) mandates Aboriginal people are not subject to general conservation restrictions so long as they engage in hunting only for food, ceremonial or religious purposes (in all cases must be non-commercial). However, restrictions may be put in place to protect wildlife and must specifically state that such restrictions apply to Aboriginal people. This section does not give an Aboriginal person right of entry onto land. Entry onto private land, state forests, national parks or other kinds of crown land is regulated under State or Territory Legislation and is variable.

=== Controversy ===
There has been a number of controversies surrounding indigenous Australians and the Australian government regarding their hunting rights. In 1993, the Australian Government brought in legislation called the Native Title Act. This act meant that the Australian Government recognised that the Aboriginal Australians have rights to and interests to their land that come from their traditional laws and customs. One of the activities that are covered by the Native Title is the right for Aboriginal peoples to hunt otherwise endangered species for food or ceremonial purposes. The killing of endangered is a wide source of outrage with many calling for a rewrite of the legislation to protect the endangered species.
