= Spotlighting =

Method of hunting at night

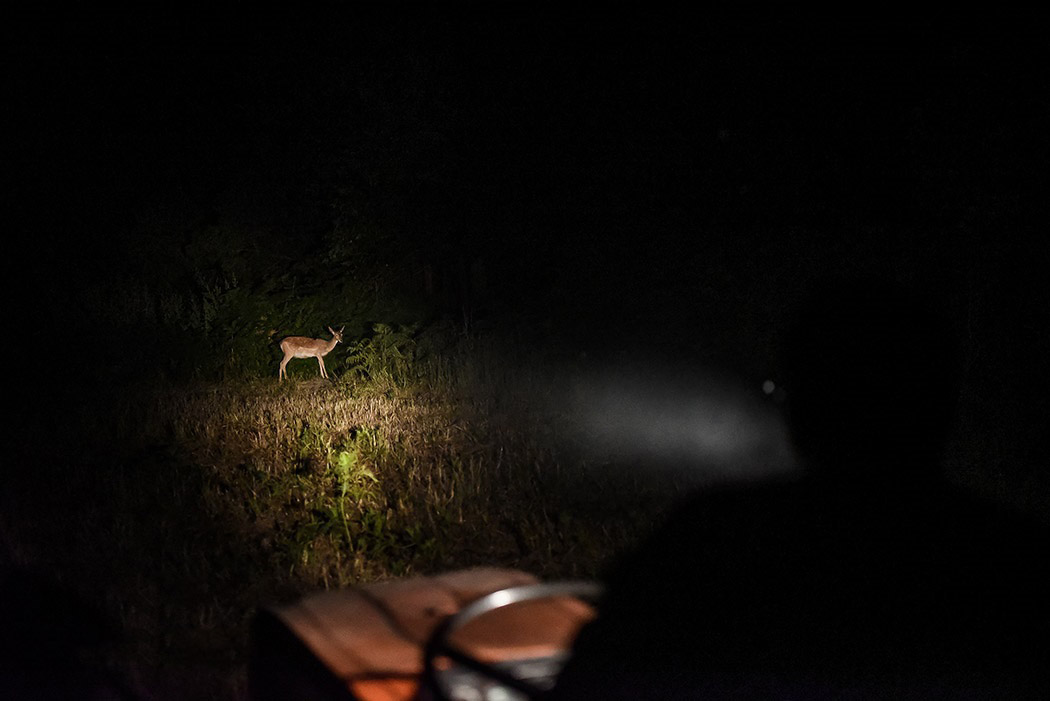
Persian fallow deer in Dasht-e Naz Wildlife Refuge

Spotlighting or lamping (also known as jacklighting, shining, illuminating, pit-lamping, and the killing lamp) is a method of hunting nocturnal animals using off-road vehicles and high-powered lights, spotlights, lamps or flashlights, that makes special use of the eyeshine revealed by many animal species. A further important aspect is that many animals (e.g., foxes and rabbits) often remain to continually stare at the light, and do not appear to see the light as a threat, as they would a human. It is possible to carefully approach animals on foot to a short distance if bright light is continuously maintained on the animal, greatly improving chances of successful killing. Spotlighting may also be used as a method of surveying nocturnal fauna. Repeated, frequent spotlighting may have a detrimental effect on animals, and is discouraged.

== Technique ==
The spotting and shooting often take place from the moving vehicle. Experienced drivers on familiar territory (such as farmers in their own paddocks) may turn off the vehicle headlights to minimize the distractions.

The most common vehicles used are light four-wheel drive trucks and utilities. A team may consist of three persons: the driver, the shooter, and the spotter. The shooter and spotter stand side by side behind the cab, holding onto a bar at the front of the tray or on top of the cab, which allows them a good 360 degree view. The spotter sweeps the surrounding countryside with a powerful hand-held lamp with a tightly focused beam.

Spotlighting can be conducted by two persons where the driver operates the spotlight or alone where the driver spotlights using a remote mounted spotlight or automotive lighting and shoots from the driver's seat of the vehicle.

Lightweight lamps, torches and hand-held spotlights enable hunters to spotlight by foot. With a slow walking pace, the hunter will move forward while scanning for eyeshine. If spotted out of range, the light is typically turned off and the approach is made in the dark. Once a target is found, the hunter will typically hold the mesmerised animal in the glare of the lamp and shoot for the area between its glowing eyes.

== Legality ==
=== Australia ===
Various rules govern nocturnal hunting and hunting from motor vehicles, but typically the use of illumination devices is prohibited for deer hunting. Commercial hunters are normally exempt from such regulations where the emphasis is upon population control.

=== New Zealand ===
Spotlighting on New Zealand Department of Conservation land is prohibited by law.

=== North America ===
Spotlighting is illegal in many locations throughout the United States and Canada.

In Colorado, hunting any wildlife on public land with artificial light is unlawful.

In Manitoba and British Columbia, spotlighting is illegal except for status Indians. In Saskatchewan, spotlighting is illegal without exception.

=== Great Britain and Ireland: lamping ===
Lamping is a similar practice in the United Kingdom and Republic of Ireland of hunting at night using powerful lamps and either guns, birds of prey or dogs. It does not always involve vehicles. Animals associated with this form of hunting include foxes, rabbits, and hares.

In England, Scotland, and Wales, most forms of hunting with dogs have been made illegal by the Hunting Act 2004 but rabbits and rats were specifically included on a list of exemptions, therefore lamping these animals with dogs is still legal. Hunting fox, rabbit and hare with dogs is legal in Northern Ireland. In Britain lamping foxes with dogs has been rendered illegal, however lamping in order to shoot them remains legal.

In Northern Ireland, lamping is also practiced against foxes and rabbits.

In the Republic of Ireland, it is legal to hunt foxes and rabbits with lamps, with a license and landowner's permission, but it is illegal to use a "mechanically propelled vehicle" or to hunt hares or deer with lights. It is illegal to lamp from a vehicle on or near a public road. An attempt to forbid hunting with guns between midnight and 6 a.m. failed in 2017.

Once an animal has been located in the beam of light, it is either shot or the dog(s) released. The dogs used are typically lurchers (cross between a sighthound and any other breed of dog), or longdogs (cross between two sighthounds, typically a greyhound and a whippet), but may be a cross of many breeds.

Although white light is often used for lamping, using a red or orange filter is preferred, as this has a lesser effect on the night vision of the hunter (human or dog), and is less likely to frighten any potential prey.

== See also ==
- Fishing light attractor
