= Cherry eye =

Prolapse of the tear gland of the third eyelid in animals

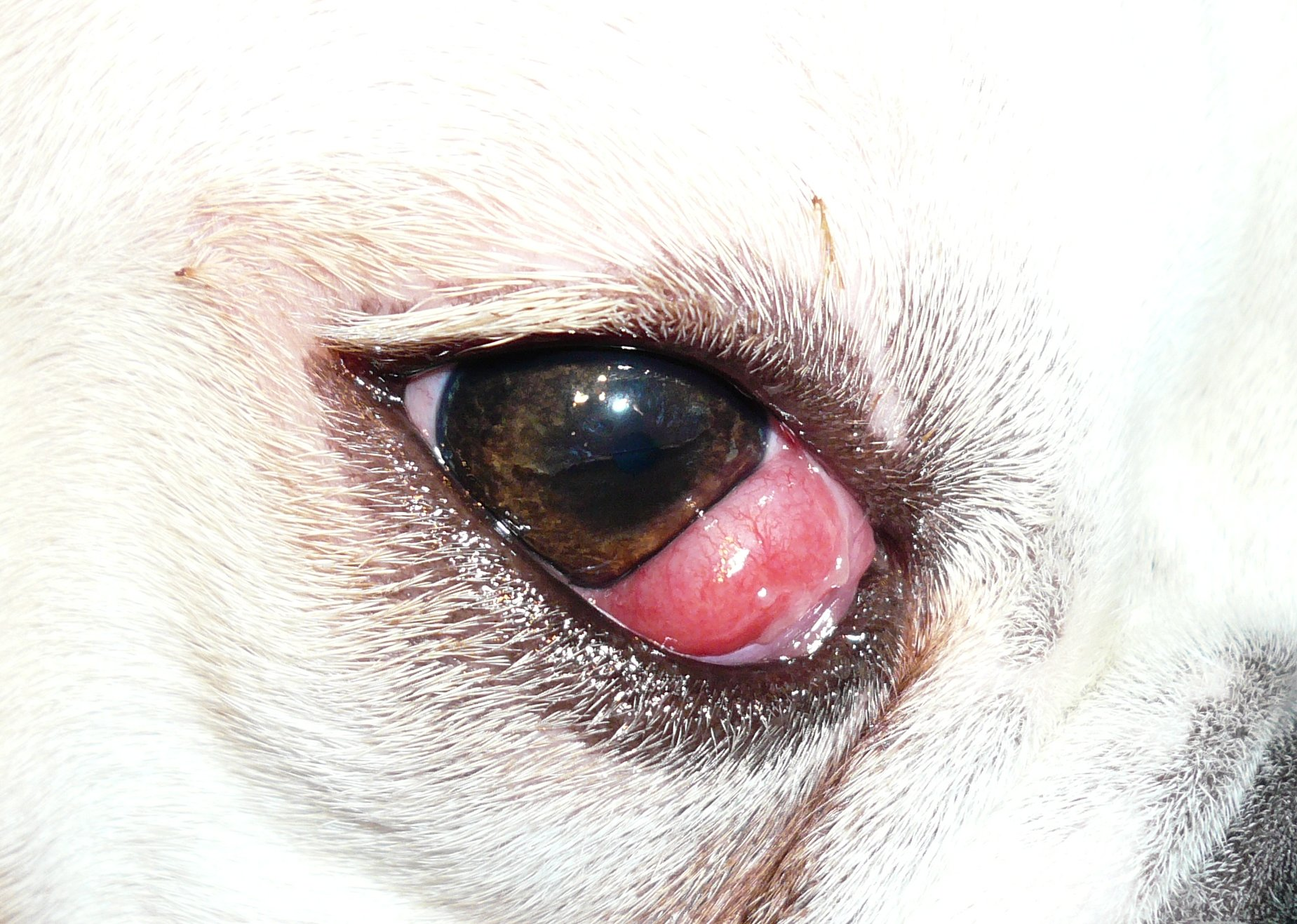
Close-up of a cherry eye

Cherry eye is a disorder of the nictitating membrane (NM), also called the third eyelid, present in the eyes of dogs and cats. Cherry eye is most often seen in young dogs under the age of two. Common misnomers include adenitis, hyperplasia, adenoma of the gland of the third eyelid; however, cherry eye is not caused by hyperplasia, neoplasia, or primary inflammation. In many species, the third eyelid plays an essential role in vision by supplying oxygen and nutrients to the eye via tear production. Normally, the gland can turn inside-out without detachment. Cherry eye results from a defect in the retinaculum which is responsible for anchoring the gland to the periorbita. This defect causes the gland to prolapse and protrude from the eye as a red fleshy mass. Problems arise as sensitive tissue dries out and is subjected to external trauma Exposure of the tissue often results in secondary inflammation, swelling, or infection. If left untreated, this condition can lead to dry eye syndrome and other complications.

== Description ==
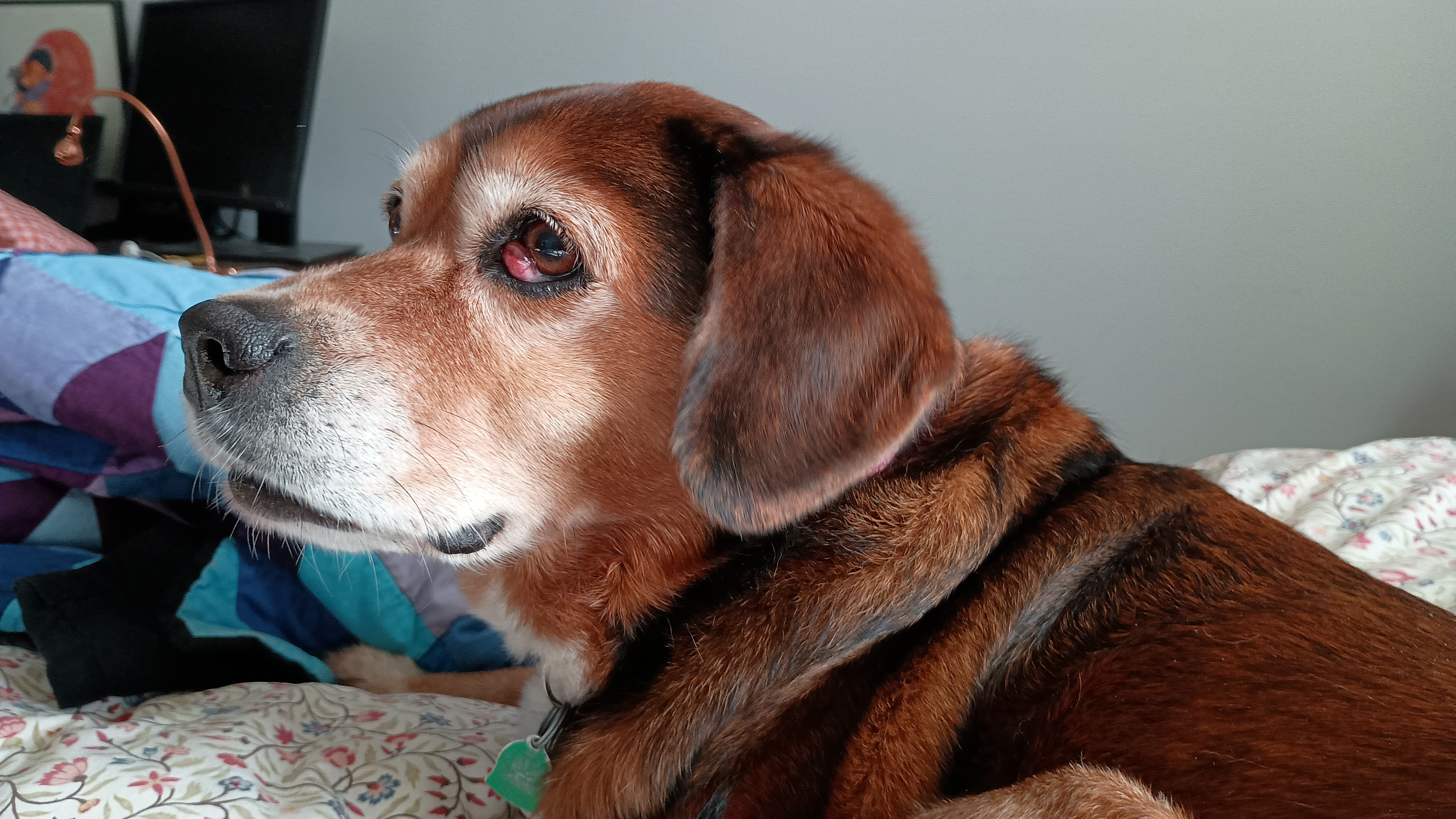
Beagle-cocker spaniel mix with cherry eye

Cherry eye is most common in young dogs, especially breeds such as Beagle, Cavalier King Charles Spaniel, English Bulldog, Lhasa Apso, Shih Tzu, West Highland White Terrier, Pug, Bloodhound, American Cocker Spaniel, and Boston Terrier. Cherry eye is rare in felines, but can occur. This defect is most common in the Burmese cats. A similar condition exists in dwarf lop-eared rabbits, which occurs in the harderian gland. Similar surgical treatment is necessary.

There is likely a complicated and multigenic component involving genetic risk factors. Some breeds are considered to be more susceptible to its development than others, including the Bulldog, Boston Terrier, Bull Terrier, Lhasa Apso, Cocker Spaniel, St. Bernard, Shar-pei, Shih Tzu and Poodle The NM contains many glands which merge and appear as a single gland. Typically, glands secrete tears for lubrication of the cornea. Lack of anchoring allows the gland to flip up, causing the gland to prolapse. Symptoms include a visible fleshy mass, abnormal tear production, and a discharge or drainage from the eye. Cherry eye is typically diagnosed by examination of the conjunctiva and nictitating membrane. The most obvious symptom of cherry eye is a round fleshy mass in the medial canthus of the eye, similar in appearance to the fruit it is named for. This mass may be unilateral or bilateral. Both eyes may develop cherry eye at different times in the animal's life. Other symptoms of cherry eye include drainage from the eye and abnormal tear production. Initially, cherry eye results in overproduction of tears, but eventually changes to unsubstantial tear production.

== Treatment ==
=== Non-surgical ===
Cherry eye, if caught early, can be resolved with a downward diagonal-toward-snout closed-eye massage of the affected eye or occasionally self-corrects alone or with antibiotics and steroids. Sometimes the prolapse will correct itself with no interference, or with slight physical manual massage manipulation as often as necessary coupled with medication.

=== Surgical ===
Surgery is the most common means of repairing a cherry eye. Surgery involves gland replacement, not excision, by anchoring the membrane to the orbital rim or using a pocket technique. In severely infected cases, preoperative antibiotics may be necessary by means of antibiotic eye ointment. Removal of the gland was once an acceptable treatment, and made the eye appear completely normal. Despite cosmetic appeal, removal of the gland reduces tear production by 30 percent. Tear production is essential in maintaining and protecting the eye from the external environment. Reduced tear production is especially problematic in breeds of animals predisposed to Keratoconjunctivitis sicca (KCS), also known as dry eye syndrome. With surgeries performed in this manner, KCS often results later in life.

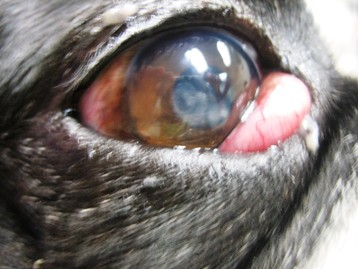
Close-up of prolapsed gland in small breed dog

KCS is not common in dogs, affecting one per cent of the dog population. KCS is a chronic degenerative conjunctivitis that can lead to impaired vision and blindness. KCS has a wide array of causes including drug toxicity, cherry eye, previous surgery, trauma, and irradiation. KCS can be treated, but treatment often spans the entirety of the animal's life.

In contrast to this, several replacement surgical procedures exist to remedy cherry eye. Replacement of the gland results in lower instances of dry eye later in life. Surgery types are broken into two groups: anchoring procedures and pocket/envelope procedures. At least 8 surgical techniques currently exist. In anchoring procedures, the prolapsed gland must be sutured to the periorbital fascia, the sclera, or the base of the third eyelid. In contrast, pocket procedures involve suturing healthy tissue around the prolapsed to enclose and secure it. Each of these techniques may be performed with an anterior or superior approach, depending on which direction of suturing will cause the least complications to the eye.

==== Anchoring method ====
Originally, the anchoring method involved suturing the gland to the globe. This method was superseded over time due to the risky and difficult nature of the surgery, along with a high rate of recurrence. Anchoring approaches from posterior may disrupt normal fluid excretion. Subsequently, an anterior approach was introduced. Disadvantages of anchoring techniques include restricted mobility of third eyelid, which is essential in the functions of fluid distribution and self-cleaning. New procedures are currently being explored to allow tacking of the NM without restricting movement of the third eyelid. Few studies compare results of surgeries, therefore choosing a procedure is a matter of preference.

==== Envelope/pocket method ====
The envelope method, often called the pocket technique, requires suturing of tissue around the prolapse, encasing it in a layer of conjunctiva. Pocket techniques are easiest for doctors to learn. Pocket methods also have anterior and posterior versions. Posterior suturing techniques are the most commonly used because they cause the least complications, with no alterations in tear production. Surgery should only be attempted by experienced surgeons. Inappropriate surgical techniques can result in many complications including cysts on the eye.

== Prognosis ==
=== Without treatment ===
Previously, treatment was thought optional until the role of NM was fully understood. The NM gland is responsible for 40–50% of tear production. If exposed for extended periods of time, the gland is at risk for trauma, secondary infection, and reduced tear production. Many complications can arise if left untreated: early closed-eye massage manipulation is recommended to prevent inflammation .

=== Post treatment ===
Postoperative treatment includes antibiotic eye ointment three times daily for two weeks. It is possible to have a relapse of the gland after surgery and require multiple surgeries. With treatment, it is possible for animals to live a normal life.

== See also ==
- Conjunctivitis, commonly referred to as pink eye
