= Longdog =

Dog of sighthound type, usually cross-bred

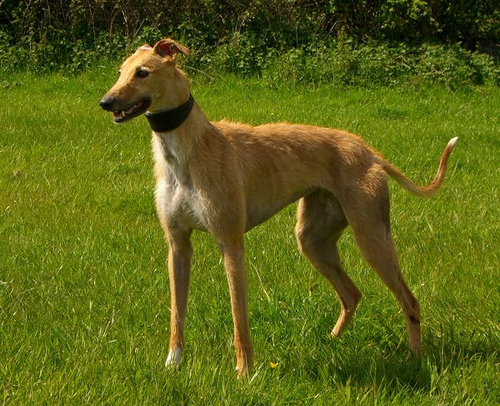
- Greyhound x Deerhound cross-breed
- Other names: Long dog
- Foundation stock: Sighthounds, especially Greyhounds and Borzoi
- Breed status: Not recognised as a breed by any major kennel club.

A longdog (also long-dog or long dog) is any dog of sighthound type, whether pure-bred or not. Traditionally, the term referred to a cross-breed between two sighthounds of different breeds, one of which is usually a Greyhound. The name "longdog" comes from the dog's long body, legs, neck, and head. A longdog is generally larger than a feist, which is an American cross.

Longdogs are hunting dogs, used to pursue a variety of game, ranging from deer to coyotes to kangaroos.

== Name ==
Some controversy surrounds the definition of "longdog". Traditionally, the phrase referred to a crossbreed produced by mating two sighthounds. This was meant to be a distinction from the lurcher, which is a cross between a sighthound and a working dog, usually a terrier or herding dog. However, some may use the word to refer to purebred sighthounds, such as salukis. Indeed, the Oxford English Dictionary defines "longdog" as a synonym for a Greyhound. The word "longdog" has, in the past, been attached to names of purebreds; for example, the Afghan Hound was once called the Afghan Longdog.

In 2001, Desmond Morris wrote that the distinction against lurchers was "outdated". Responding to the controversy, Author Frank Sheardown facetiously said that "a longdog is one that carries no trace whatsoever of any blood other than longdog."

== History ==
Like lurchers, longdogs are associated with poachers in the United Kingdom, especially of deer and, in the east counties, hares. With the increase in urban sprawl, longdogs have dropped in popularity.

== See also ==
- American Staghound
- Coursing
- Feist
- Kangaroo dog
- Lurcher
- Silken Windhound
