= Lurcher =

British dog cross-breed

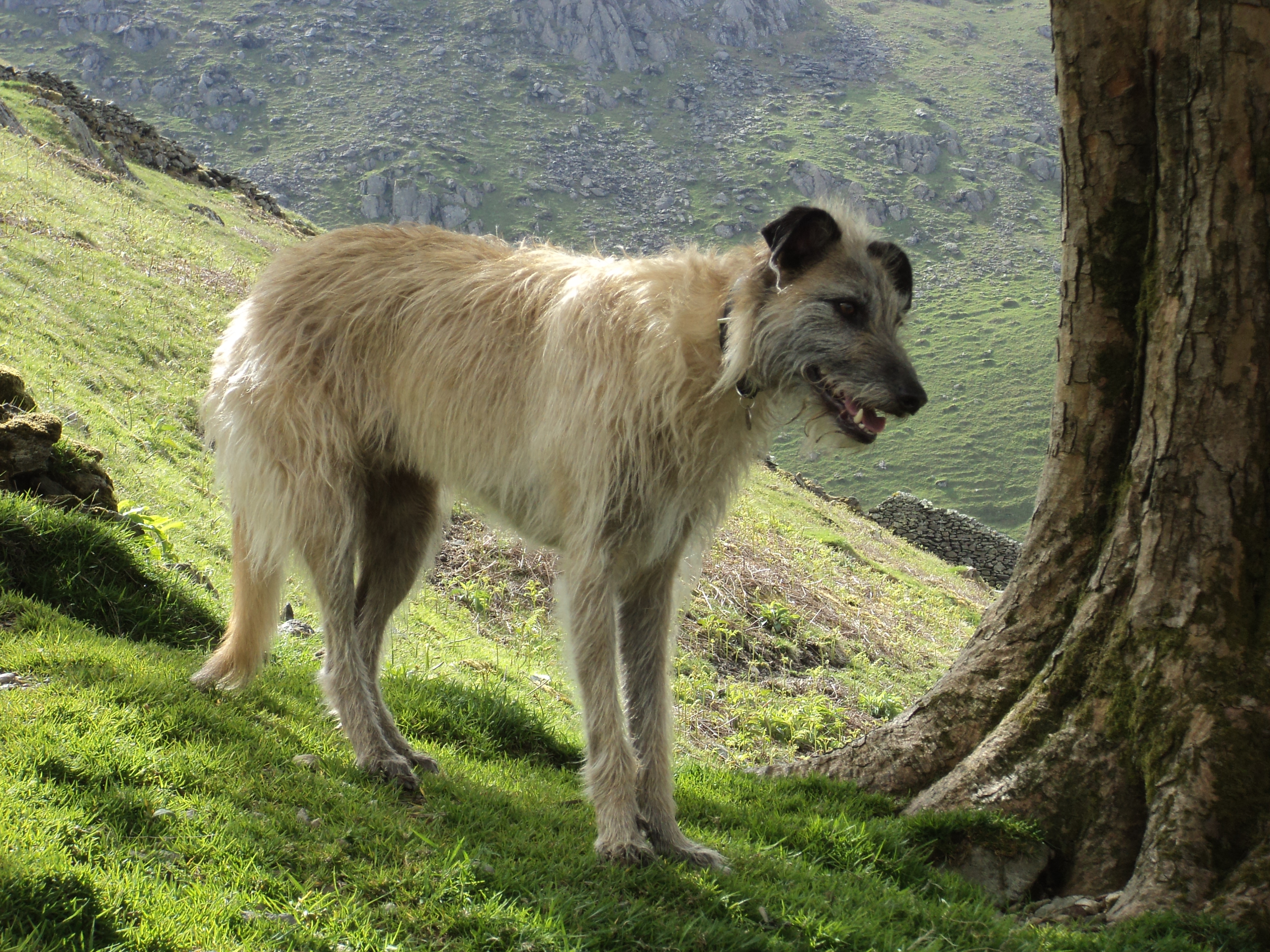
- Other names: Poacher's dog
- Origin: Great Britain and Ireland
Traits
- Coat: Any
- Colour: Any
- Litter size: variable

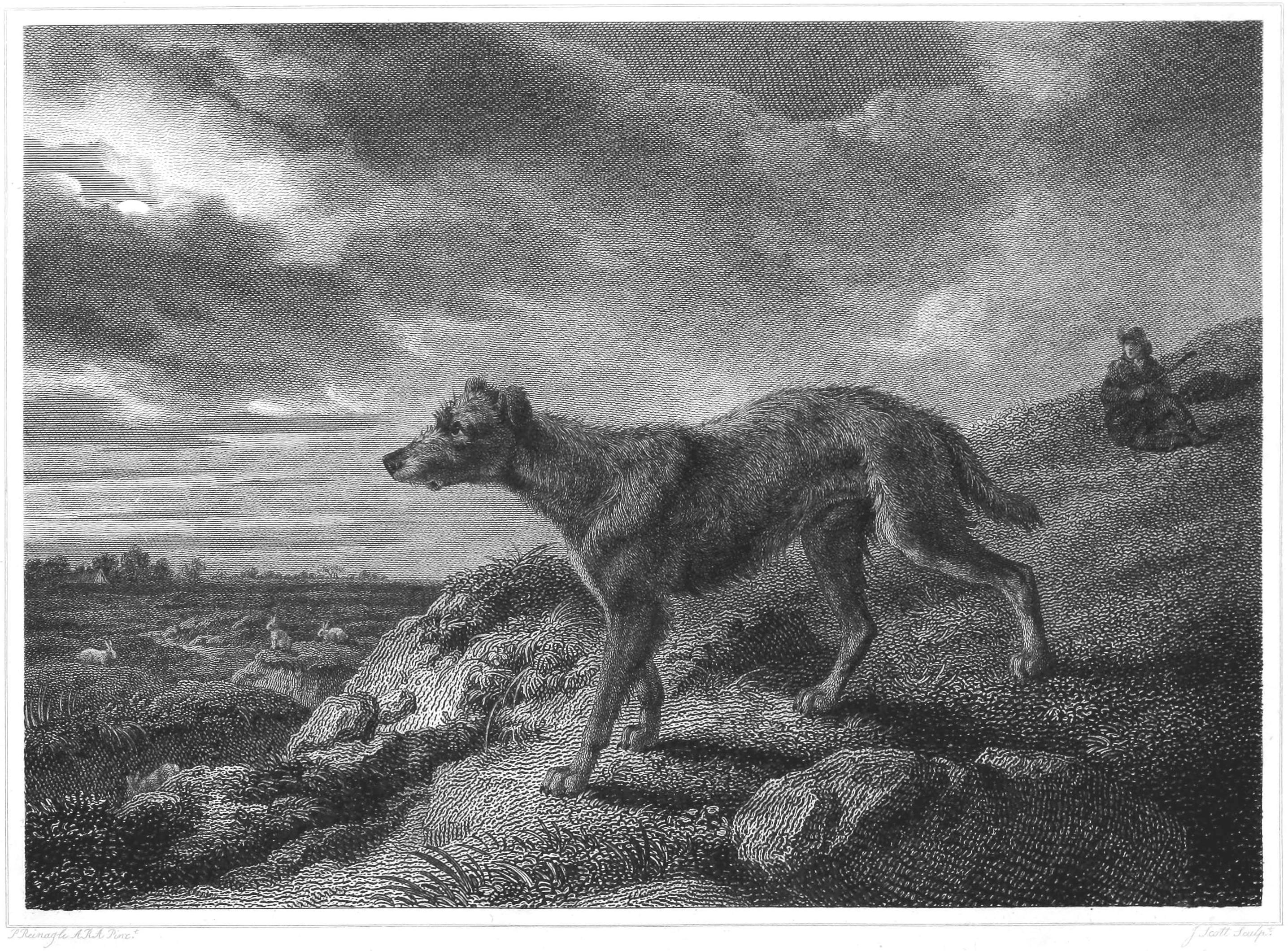
Lurcher, illustration from The Sportsman's Cabinet by William Taplin, 1803; engraved from a painting by Philip Reinagle

A lurcher is a crossbred dog resulting from mating a greyhound or other sighthound with a dog of another type such as a herding dog, terrier or working dog. The lurcher is not a "breed": the term is a generic descriptor of a diverse group of dogs. They are known for being loyal, fast, and versatile. For hundreds of years, lurchers were strongly associated with poaching; in modern times, they are kept as hunting or companion dogs.

== History ==
Lurcher is an old English term for a crossbred dog; specifically, the result of mating a sighthound with a dog of another type, typically a working breed. The term was first used with this meaning in 1668; it is considered to be derived from the verb lurch, apparently a variant form of lurk, meaning lurk or steal.

In England from 1389, the right to keep a dog of any kind used in hunting^{[note 1]} was limited by law to those qualified by possessing lands, holdings, or income worth more than ten pounds per annum; in other words, royalty, nobility, the gentry, and the wealthy. This law, though repeatedly modified, remained in force until 1831. As a result, hunters and poachers bred sighthounds with breeds that could disguise their sighthound bloodline, often under thick rough coats, whilst adding other abilities including intelligence, stamina or turning speed. The dog chosen for this could be an available farm dog, often a collie or terrier.

In the nineteenth century, the word was used to describe some rough-haired regional greyhounds, which were banned from competition by coursing clubs such as Swaffham and Newmarket, due to the perception that they cut "turns" to kill instead of working the hare to gain points. The tendency to "wrench" and "cut" rather than "course" was considered to be unfair and a violation of "The Law of the Leash."

== Description ==
A lurcher is a cross, generally between a sighthound and a working dog breed. Generally, the aim of the cross is to produce a sighthound with more intelligence, a canny animal suitable for poaching rabbits, hares, and game birds. Over time, poachers and hunters discovered that the crossing of certain breeds with sighthounds produced a dog better suited to this purpose, given the lurcher's combination of speed and intelligence. In more recent times, the crossing of different sighthound breeds with each other (e.g. a greyhound with a saluki) has become more common. These dogs were traditionally called longdogs but these days "lurcher" is applied to them as well.

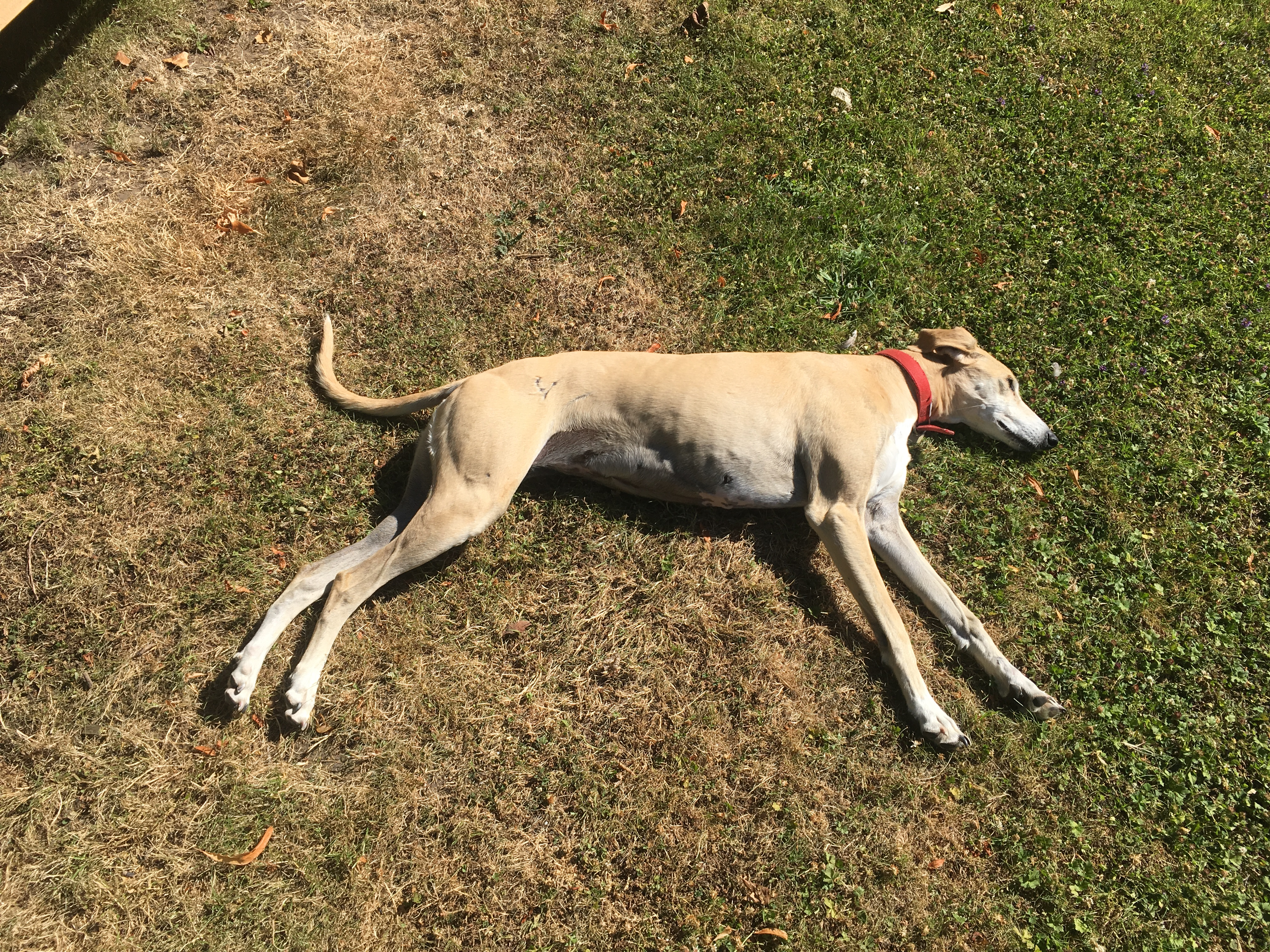
Saluki lurcher

== Use ==
Lurchers were traditionally bred in England to assist poachers in hunting rabbits and hares. Around the world they are kept as sporting dogs and family pets, or to compete in sports such as lure coursing and dog racing. In the United States they may compete in lure coursing events through the AKC and the UKC. Cross-breeds are not registered and formally recognized by any major kennel club. In North America, the Canadian Kennel Club can deprive individual members of their club rights if they have been proven of crossbreeding any breed as in creating lurchers; in the US, lurchers can be registered with the North American Lurcher and Longdog Association.

== Notes ==
As stated in an Act of Parliament: "None shall hunt but they which have sufficient living" in the Anglo-Norman and English of the time: null leverer, ne lerce, nautre chien pur chacer, translated as "no greyhound, hound nor other dog to hunt"

== Bibliography ==
- Russell, Edmund (2018). "Greyhound Nation: A Coevolutionary History of England, 1200–1900". Studies in Environment and History. Cambridge: Cambridge University Press. doi:10.1017/9781139049269. ISBN 978-1-139-04926-9. (subscription required)
