= Labradoodle =

Crossbreed dog

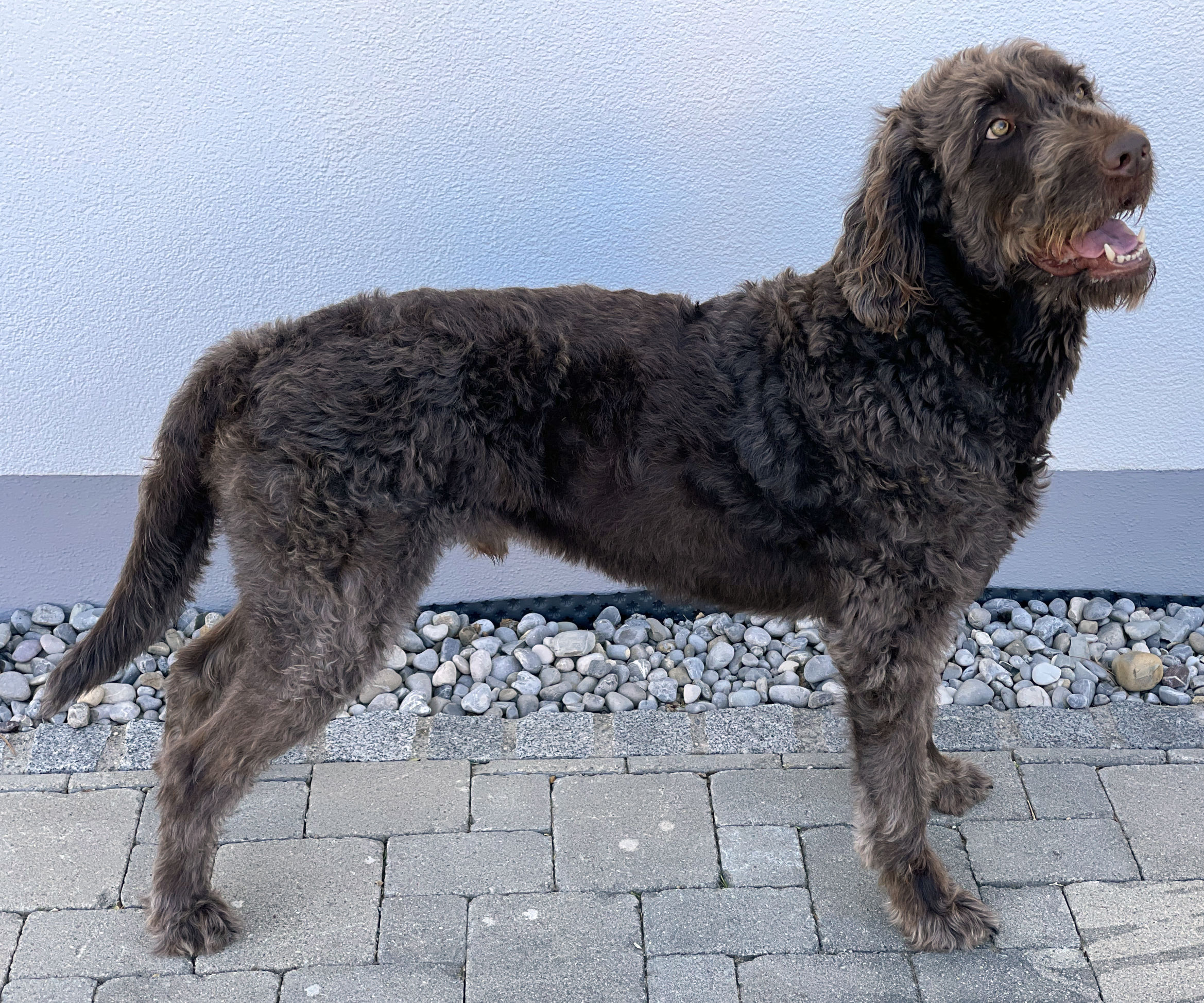
- A brown male labradoodle
- Other names: Australian labradoodle
- Origin: Australia
- Foundation stock: Labrador Retriever, Poodle
- Variety status: Not recognised as a breed by any major kennel club.

A labradoodle (/ˈlæbrəduːdəl/) is a crossbreed dog originating from Australia created by crossing a Labrador Retriever and a Standard or Miniature Poodle. Labradoodles were intended to be a good choice for people allergic to canine dander.

The Australian Labradoodle Association, an organization run by labradoodle breeders, says they are "generally considered healthy dogs". However, they also state that hip and elbow dysplasia are common problems affecting labradoodles. (Note: The Australian Labradoodle Association of America, which represents Labradoodle breeders, says the animals are 'generally considered healthy dogs' but do have some common, but extreme, problems, like hip and elbow dysplasia.) Other ailments include eye diseases and Addison's disease. Wally Conron of Australia, who is credited with inventing the breed, has commented that healthy labradoodles are "few and far between" and most are "crazy or have a hereditary problem".

== Breeding history ==
=== Origins ===
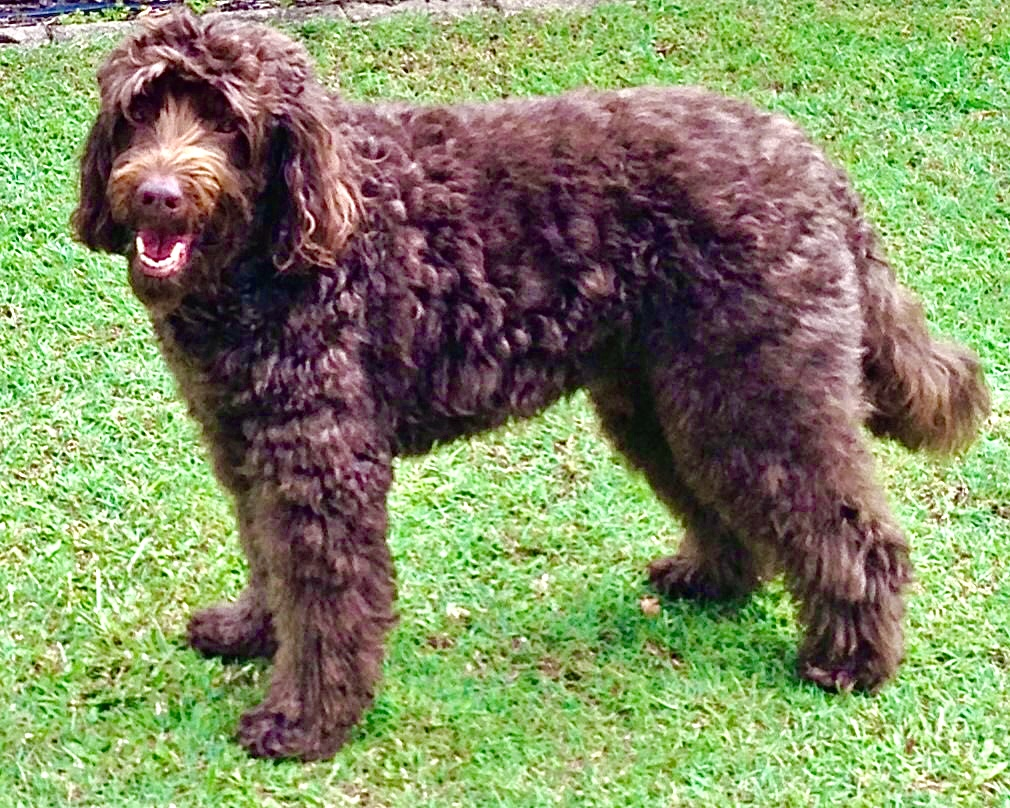
A ten-year-old Australian Labradoodle

Australian breeder Wally Conron introduced the cross-breed to the Royal Guide Dog Association of Australia in Victoria. Conron hoped that the combination of the low-shedding coat of the poodle, along with the gentleness and trainability of a Labrador retriever, would provide a guide dog suitable for people with allergies to fur and dander. He hoped the catchy name and claims regarding allergies would offset the stigma associated with mixed breeds and thus help him sell his litter.

Sultan, a dog from this litter, displayed all the qualities Conron was seeking and worked as a guide dog for a woman in Hawaii for ten years.

Conron has since repeatedly stated that he regrets initiating the trend for this type of crossbreed and maintains it caused "a lot of damage" and "a lot of problems", largely stemming from the genetic unpredictability of combining breeds. He felt he was to blame both for the spate of unethical breeders producing labradoodle puppy mills and for creating a "Frankenstein", adding that problems were being bred into the dogs rather than selectively breeding away from problems and towards a recognizable standard. Conron is further quoted as claiming that "for every perfect one, you're going to find a lot of crazy ones."

The labradoodle was not popular and was mostly unused as pets and/or service animals. Initially, the breed was again not popular leading to the rebranding of the dog as the "Labradoodle". The Labradoodle then experienced an explosion of popularity and quickly lost breed conformity due to a lack of kennel club recognition and thus a lack of breed standards.

In a 2019 interview, Conron said that he "released a Frankenstein monster" and that "[...] the biggest majority (of Labradoodles) are either crazy or have a hereditary problem." Brandi Hunter, the American Kennel Club's vice president of public relations and communications, mirrored Conron's concerns, saying that "[...] there is a reason why we emphasize the time and research that goes into breeding purpose-bred dogs. It matters in the long run."

=== Follow-on guide-dog breeding programmes ===
A group of labradoodle assistance dogs

Currently, as with other mixed breeds, labradoodles are not considered a purebred or breed by the AKC and other major kennel club associations in North America and across the world. Technically, they are a hybrid of two pure breeds rather than a new breed. In 2010 the AKC began allowing owners of mixed breeds to register their dogs through an alternative listing programme to receive an AKC ID number.

Guide Dogs Victoria no longer breeds labradoodles, although they are bred by other guide and assistance dog organizations in Australia and elsewhere. The Association for the Blind of Western Australia has introduced labradoodles into their training programme. Their first, Jonnie, graduated in November 2010. Labradoodles are now widely used around the world as guide, assistance, and therapy dogs. They are also popular family dogs.

=== Australian labradoodle breeding programme ===
In an effort to standardize the Labradoodle and achieve breed recognition, the Labradoodle Association of Australia (LAA) was founded in 2000. The organization began taking steps to regain a careful selective breeding program and introduced new lines to both experiment with temperament and to introduce additional genetic diversity. Over the subsequent five years, additional organizations formed and merged resulting in The International Australian Labradoodle Association (IALA).

Australian Labradoodles are called Australian Labradoodles because the Australia-based breeders wished to avoid the breed being mistaken for the many Labrador Retriever/Poodle crosses being bred in a way the LAA deemed as unhealthy and irresponsible. The Australian Labradoodle is a developing dog breed and not considered purebred.

In the current, generally accepted Australian Labradoodle's heritage, there are as many as 22 unique purebred contributors. The Australian Labradoodle generally primarily has Labrador Retriever and Poodle genetics, but recent efforts by the IALA, particularly the Australian Labradoodle Association of America (ALAA), have introduced the Irish Water Spaniel, Curly-coated Retriever and the English and American Cocker Spaniel. These additions were to increase the breed's gene pool, achieve greater health, and attempt to perfect the temperament of the dog. The IALA made the decision to abandon certain lines and that the Australian Labradoodle was a largely complete breed. Officially, the Australian Labradoodle Association (ALA) mandates that the Australian Labradoodle must have exactly three progenitors: Poodle, Labrador Retriever, and Cocker Spaniel.

The Australian Labradoodle is not recognized as a pure breed by any independent, non-regional kennel clubs or recognized registration organizations. It is, instead, considered a mixed-breed.

=== Australian Cobberdog ===
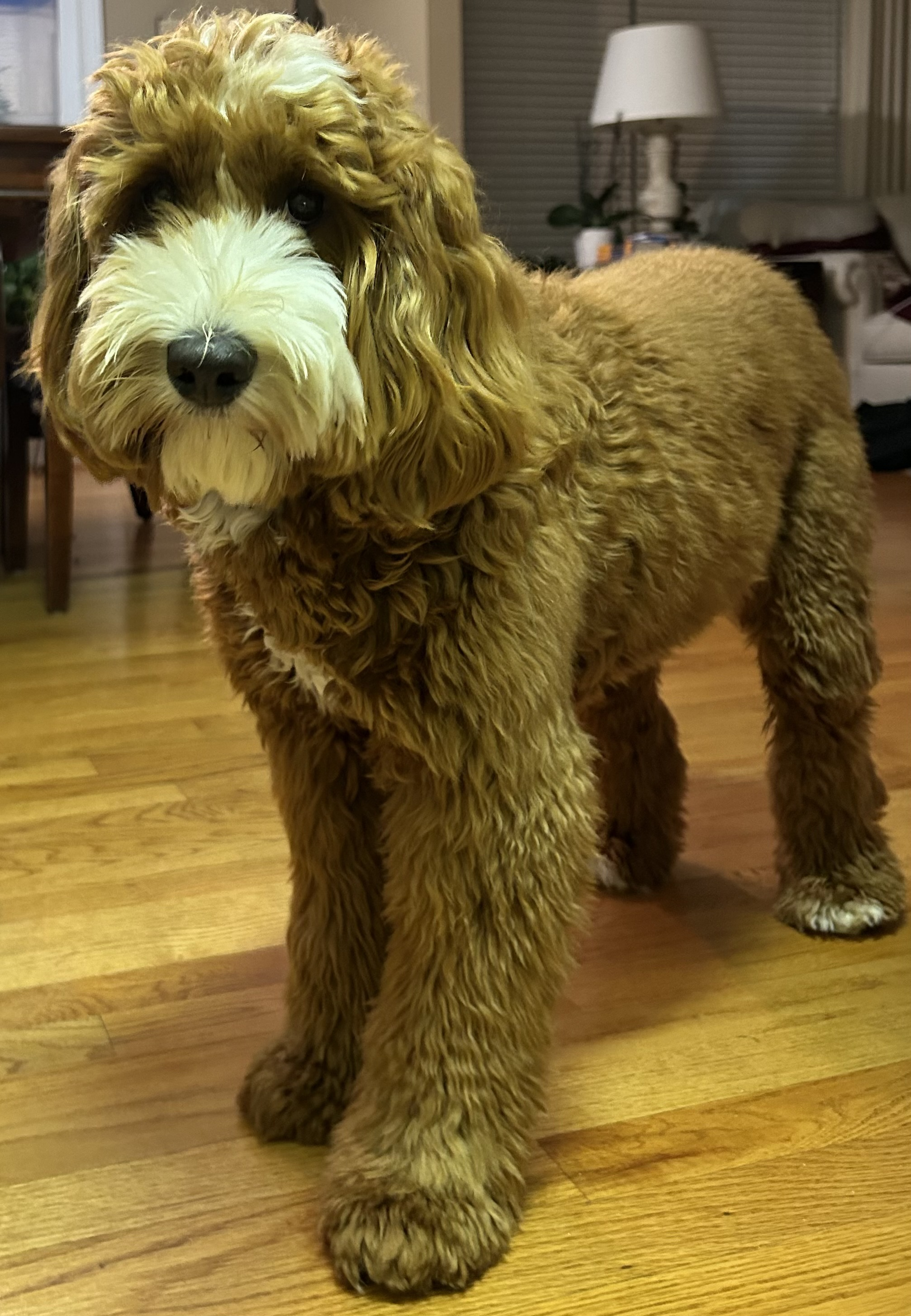
An eleven-month-old parti-coloured Cobberdog

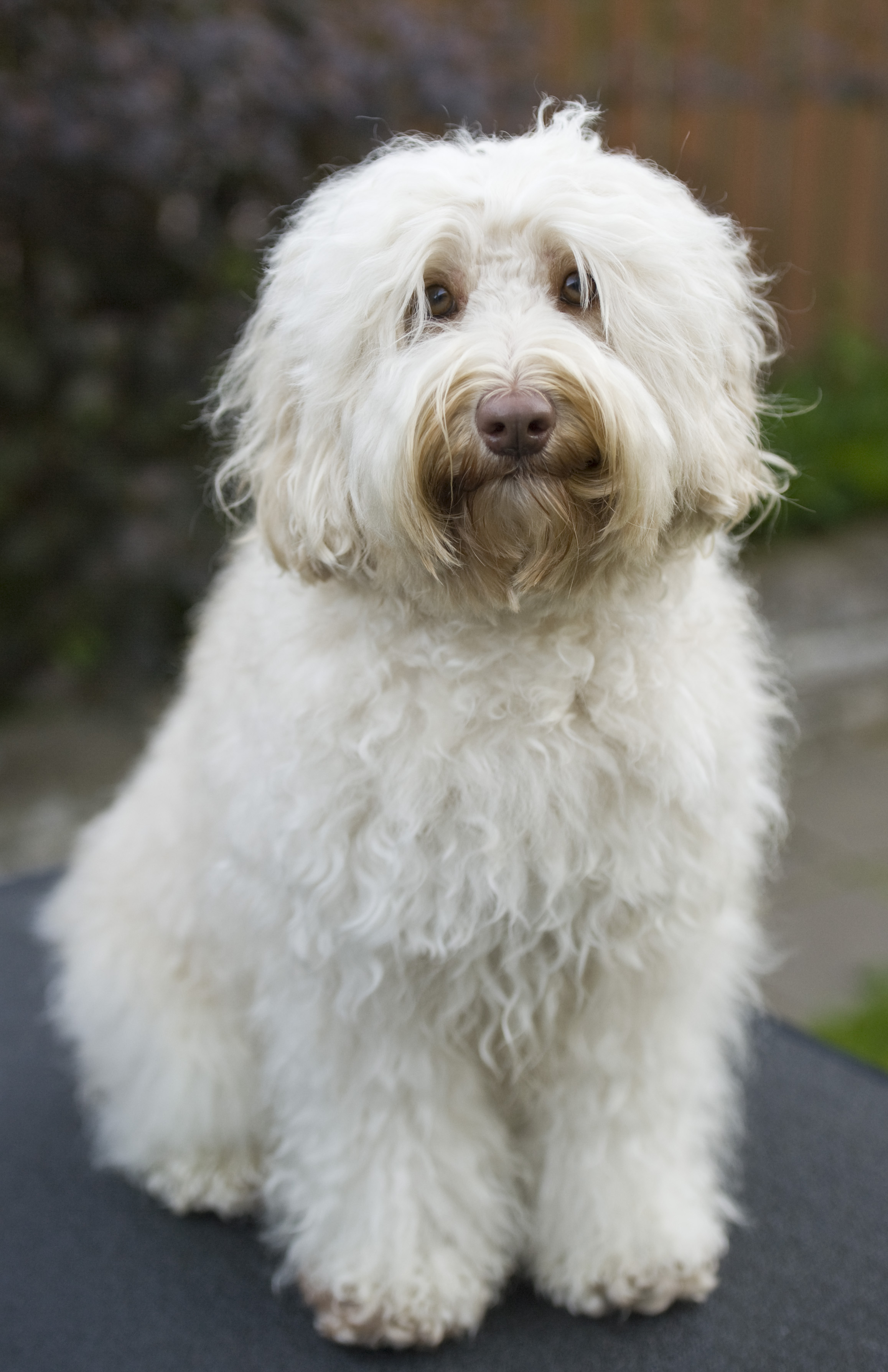
A white small medium Australian Cobberdog from Finland

The Australian Cobberdog is a dog crossbreed developed in Australia by the Rutland Manor Breeding and Research Center and Tegan Park Labradoodle Breeding & Research Centres. The mix was created as a continuation of Wally Conron's efforts to create a definable and carefully researched labradoodle. This effort was also in response to the increase in demand for labradoodles which had led to breeders referring to any combination of Labrador Retrievers and Poodles as labradoodles without temperament or hypoallergenic criteria. The inconsistency of standards for labradoodles led to the distinction of Australian Labradoodle and the further distinction of Cobberdog attributed to a purebred dog breed with more strict standards for breeding, temperament, and appearance.

In 2004 the Irish Soft-coated Wheaten Terrier was infused by Manners at Rutland Manor in Australia. Two Irish Wheaten Terriers were infused, one of which was a Melbourne Royal All Breeds Championship Show champion. That addition resulted in Manners' disassociation from the IALA and the beginning of the Australian Cobberdog's development. The goal of this new effort was a revision of the original Australian Labradoodle project's. The mission of the effort was to breed a widely usable dog with a hypoallergenic coat which would be able to be used as exemplary therapy dogs, service animals, household pets, and/or companion dogs. This dog would be bred with specific attention to coat and, most importantly, temperament. Manners' goal was to achieve what Wally Conron had initially set out to do and breed a calm, intelligent and hypoallergenic dog. Up until the initial creation of the Australian Cobberdog breeding program, no individual and/or purebred breed had been developed with the sole objective of creating an ideal candidate for being therapy and assistance dogs. This is in part a result of the fact that assisted therapy and assistance dogs are relatively modern.

The Australian Cobberdog was bred to be an ideal candidate for being therapy and service dogs. Up until the creation of the Australian Cobberdog, no breed had been developed with the sole objective of having the ideal characteristics to serve as therapy and assistance dogs. This is in part because therapy and assistance dogs are relatively modern. Australian Labradoodles, as prescribed by the Australian Labradoodle Association of America, are derived from three breeds of previously purebred dog breeds. Cobberdogs are meanwhile derived from a combination of at least eight existing breeds in order to achieve the desired temperament.

The large pool for the development of the Australian Cobberdog led to the breed's disassociation with the Australian Labradoodle; this caused the involved research centres to approach the obscure private company Master Dog Breeders and Associates. With a name change and the finalisation of the breed's DNA sequence, the standards for physical and temperamental attributes were established and the Cobberdog was made the only pure breed of labradoodle.

In 2012, the Australian Cobberdog was accepted as a new breed in development by the semi-obscure Master Dog Breeders and Associates (MDBA) a worldwide breed registry company. With the breed's acceptance, a pedigree and breed standards were set. The breed's unique DNA sequence was also categorized in order to establish the validity of a purebred Australian Cobberdog.

One condition for the Cobberdog's entry into the MDBA was that the breed has a name which distinguishes it from the Labradoodle, thus distinguishing the new pure breed from a less recognized cross-bred and unregulated category of dogs. The original project's name for the breed was Service Animal Australian Labradoodle. The decision to name the breed the "Australian Cobberdog" was done to maintain the Australian identity of the breed; the latter half of the name, "Cobberdog", comes from the Australian term "cobber" which simply means "friend" or "friendly". In total, the name Australian Cobberdog directly means "friendly Australian dog".

Since the breed's acceptance, the number of MDBA-certified Cobberdog breeders has expanded to over 150 worldwide and the breed continues to become increasingly popular, although it is still a relatively unknown breed as of January 2024. The breed is touted as an ideal therapy dog with breeders and owners displaying that through a general standard practice of breeding dogs also being trained and used as Therapy dogs for hospitals, schools, retirement homes, and many other applications.

Cobberdog breeders make the assertion that the Australian Cobberdog was an attempt to reach the originally intended goals of the labradoodle. Prior to the explosion of the popularity of Labradoodles, they were carefully bred in an attempt to perfect the temperament and be hypoallergenic. After the popularity of Labradoodles began less careful selection and a lack of breed standards led to the modern, unrecognized crossbreed. Cobberdogs, as researchers state, are the product of continuing with the original goals of the Labradoodle project: a gentle, hypoallergenic dog with a calm demeanor and a tendency to comfort the people around them.

In early 2024, with the increasing popularity of the Australian Cobberdog, some previous new breeders of the MDBA across the globe united to form the Australian Cobberdog Society where they claim that they could take the breed a step further on the journey to "official" recognition through recognized purebred organizations. For this at this time the breed standard was refined and updated in the format as prescribed by the ANKC Ltd. However, to achieve this, one must manage studbooks for at least 15 years, which seems like an impossible task for the new ACS that only formed a splinter group in December 2024 with former members of the MDBA. The MDBA has been working on breed recognition of the Australian Cobberdog since 2012. The revised breed standard takes into account the refinement breeders have made to move dogs from the Foundation Registries of the MDBA to genetically to purebred and submission into the Purebred Registries with the National Kennel Club.

Eight breeds have contributed to the Australian Cobberdog

- Miniature Poodle
- Labrador Retriever
- American Cocker Spaniel
- English Cocker Spaniel
- Irish Water Spaniel
- Curly-coated Retriever
- Poodle
- Irish Soft-coated Wheaten Terrier

== Appearance and temperament ==
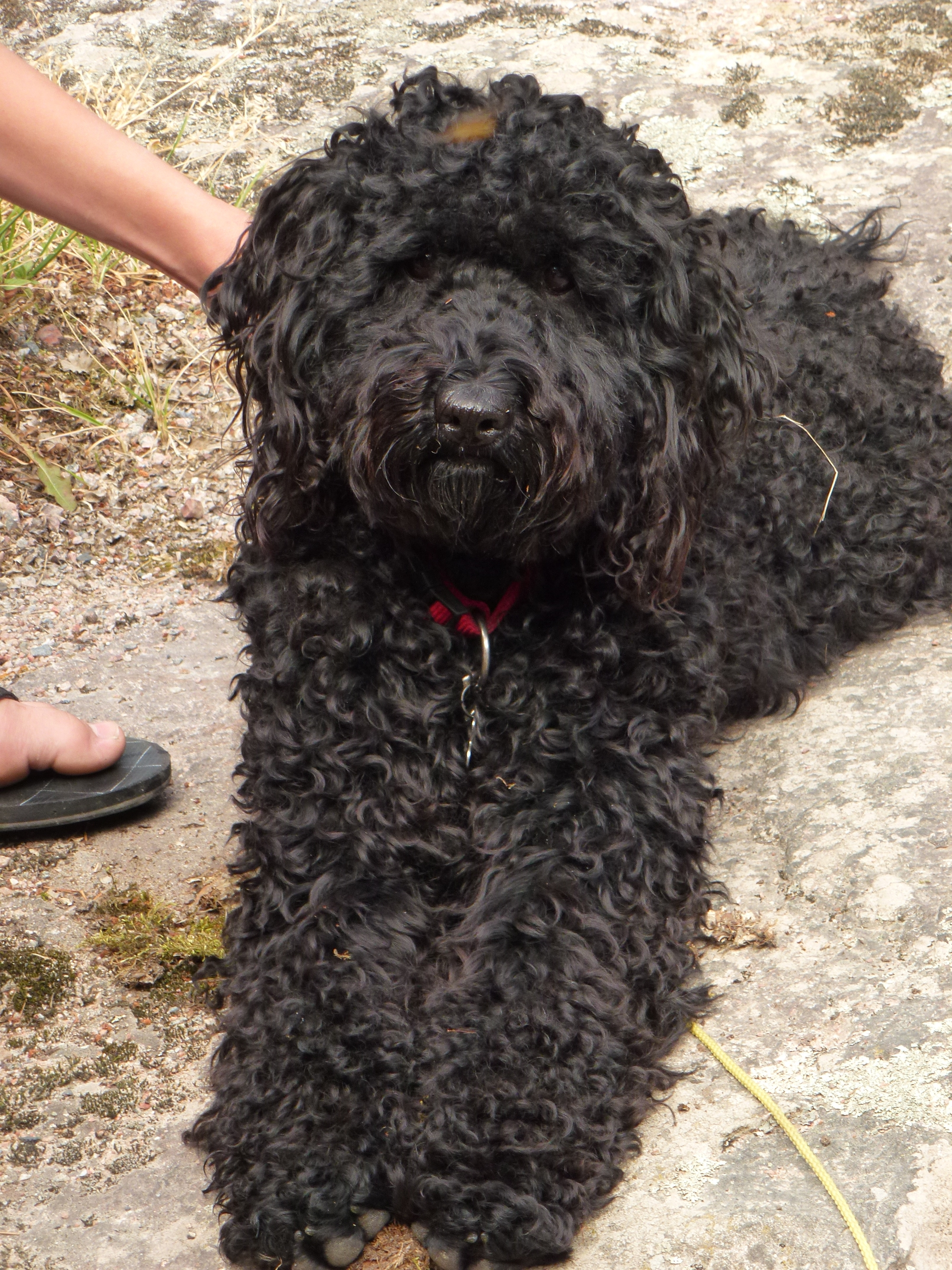
Black labradoodle

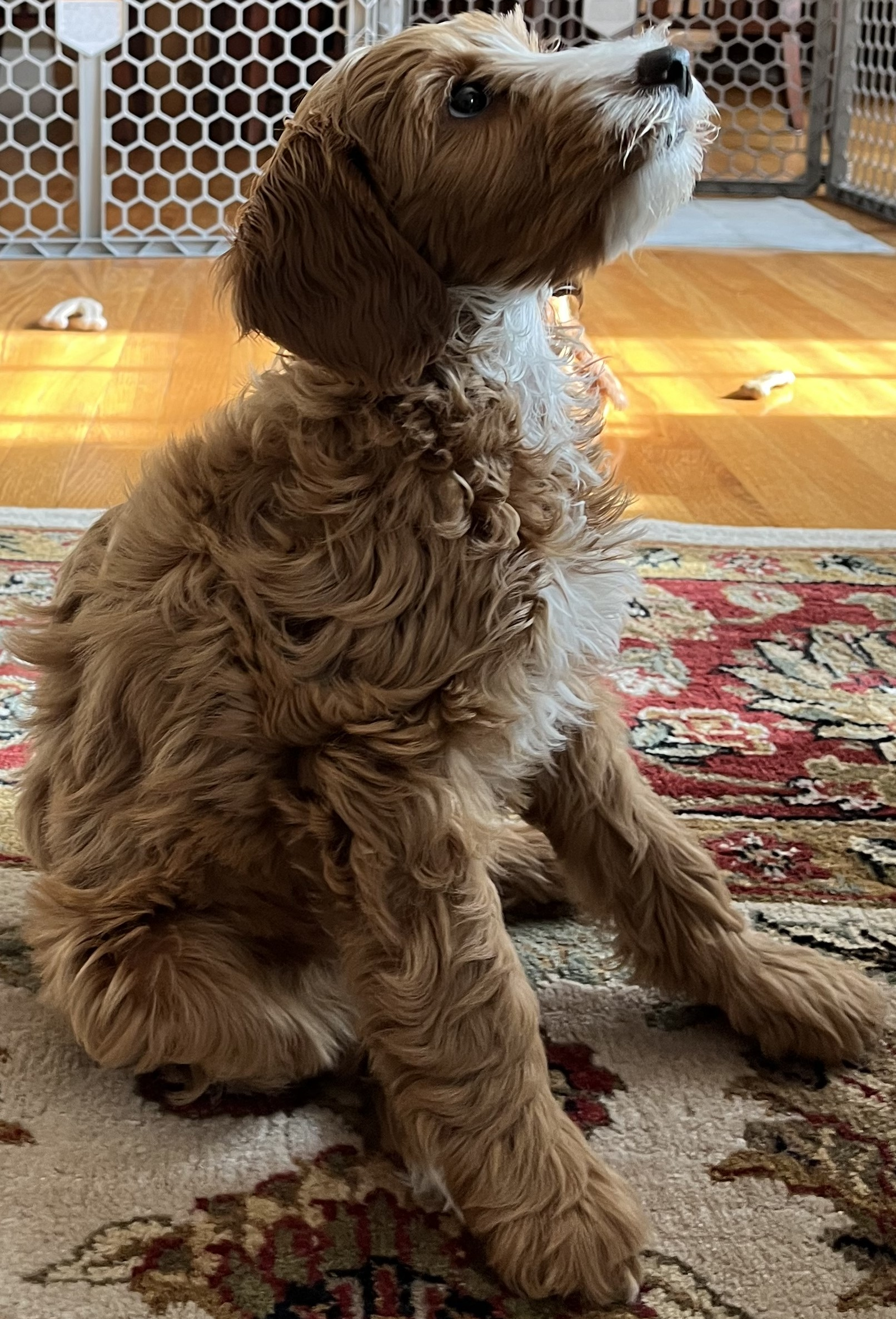
A profile view of a nine-week-old Australian Cobberdog

Because the labradoodle is a cross between two dog breeds and not a breed itself, puppies in the early mixed generations do not have consistently predictable characteristics. The first crossing of a poodle with a labrador results in variations in appearance, size, coat, and temperament. So while most labradoodles share some common traits, their appearance and behavioural characteristics are widely variable.

Labradoodles' hair can be anywhere from wiry to soft, and may be straight, wavy, or curly. (Note: Straight-coated Labradoodles are said to have "hair" coats, wavy-coated dogs have "fleece" coats, and curly-coated dogs have "wool" coats. Wool coats have tight curls, and similar in appearance to that of a poodle, but with a softer texture. Fleece coats are soft and free-flowing, with a kinked or wavy appearance. Hair coats can be curly, straight or wavy, but are more similar in texture to a Labrador's coat.) Labradoodles often display an affinity for water and strong swimming ability from their parent breeds. Like most Labrador Retrievers and poodles, labradoodles are generally friendly, energetic, and good with families and children.

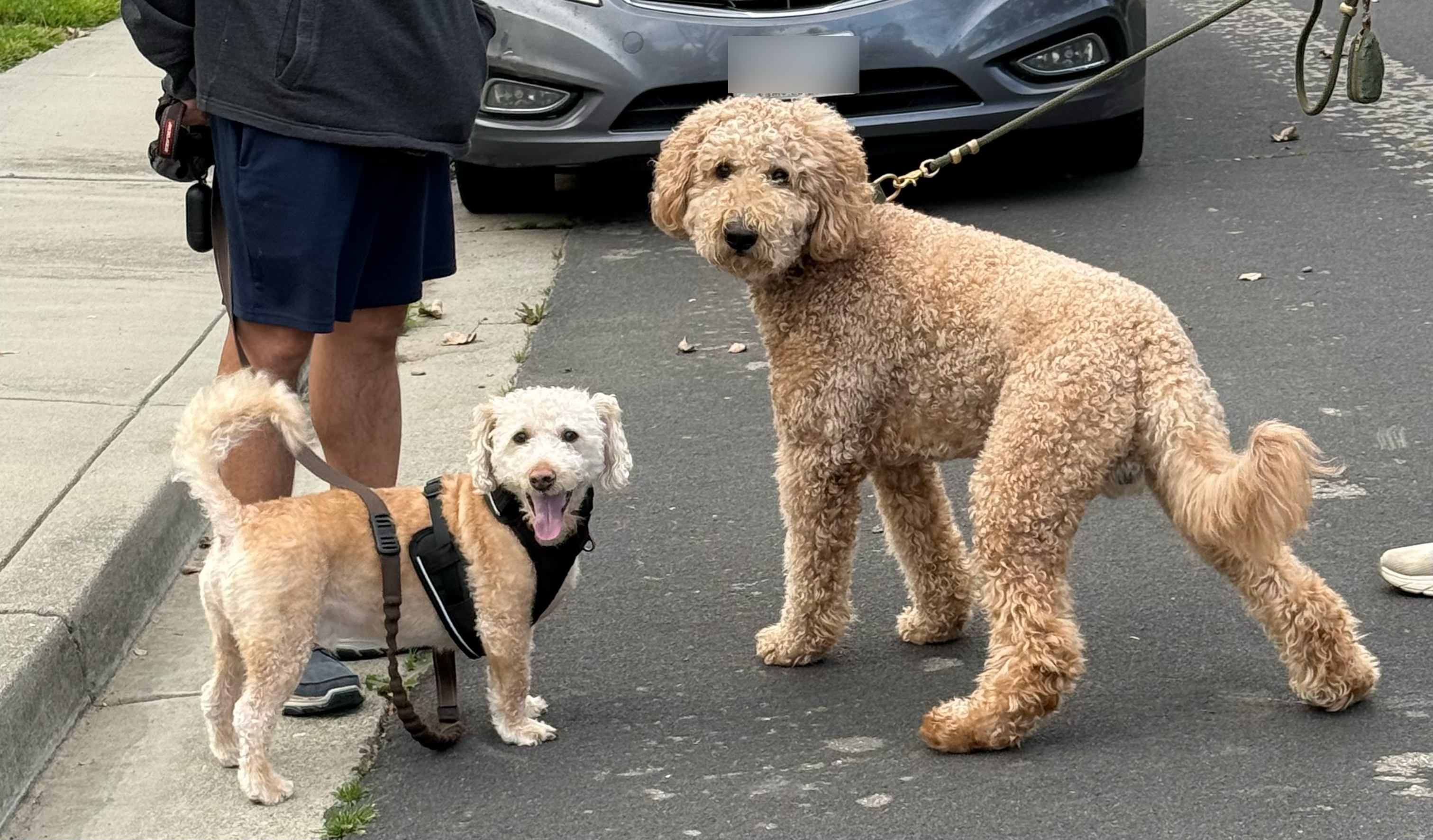
Full-grown Miniature Labradoodle next to a full-grown Standard-Sized Labradoodle

In 2012 the MDBA created a set of breed standards which any dog must adhere to in order to be considered a Foundation Dog Australian Cobberdog. In addition to these standards, general practice has created further preferences for the breed. The official breed standards state that the sum of all the dog's features should portray "A gracefully athletic and balanced dog, free of exaggeration, with a luxurious non-shedding, odourless coat." In general, the breed's goal is to be a square and regularly dimensioned dog with the breeding process more focused on health and temperament. Notable distinctive features include floppy ears, standard pigmentation of nose and paw pads, an undocked tail and a non-shedding hypoallergenic coat. In 2024, the Australian Cobberdog Society working with some former MDBA breeders across the globe claim that they have refined and updated the breed standard, to reflect the progress made and guide the direction from a breed in development to a purebred (one that can breed true). However, to be able to do that, one must be both the owner of the intellectual property and the authorship (the name Australian Cobberdog) created by the founders. The authentic Australian Cobberdog as it should be is as it has always been a gentle and smart dog, eager to please, easy to train and especially very good with children. The ACS breed standard states about the same and say that "The Australian Cobberdog is aware, smart and easy to train with a gentle will to please. They are loyal to their family without being opposed to strangers. Cobberdogs are easily recognisable by their facial furnishings with a luxurious low-shedding, long fleece coat that falls in gentle waves. They have a strong desire for close human companionship and an instinct to seek intimate eye-to-eye contact. The Australian Cobberdog's head and facial expressions are a signature trait with a pleasing open face, striking eyes and a notable muzzle. The ears are moderate, well-placed and adept to support non-verbal communication."

=== Size ===
Labradoodles can be different sizes, depending on the size of sire and dam used, and their size-names generally follow the names used for poodles: miniature, medium, and standard. Miniature labradoodles typically weigh around 18–28 lbs, medium around 26–45 pounds and standard can be from 45–75 lbs.

There are generally four size categories for Cobberdogs: miniature, large mini/small medium, medium and standard. Some breeders also include a "large medium" and/or "standard XL" category. The breed standard recognizes three size categories: miniature, medium and standard.

Cobberdog sizes are based solely on height as measured from floor to withers (top of the shoulder blade in quadrupeds). While weight is often included in size categorisation, that is typically to aid in the visualisation of sizes and not to aid in the categorisation of a specific individual.

Four general size categories
| Category name | Height range | Weight range (approx.) |
|---|---|---|
| Miniature | 35–41 centimetres (14–16 in) | 7–12 kilograms (15–26 lb) |
| Large mini/small medium | 41–47 centimetres (16–19 in) | 10–16 kilograms (22–35 lb) |
| Medium | 47–56 centimetres (19–22 in) | 14–22 kilograms (31–49 lb) |
| Standard | 56–61 centimetres (22–24 in) | 20–40 kilograms (44–88 lb) |

=== Coat texture and color ===
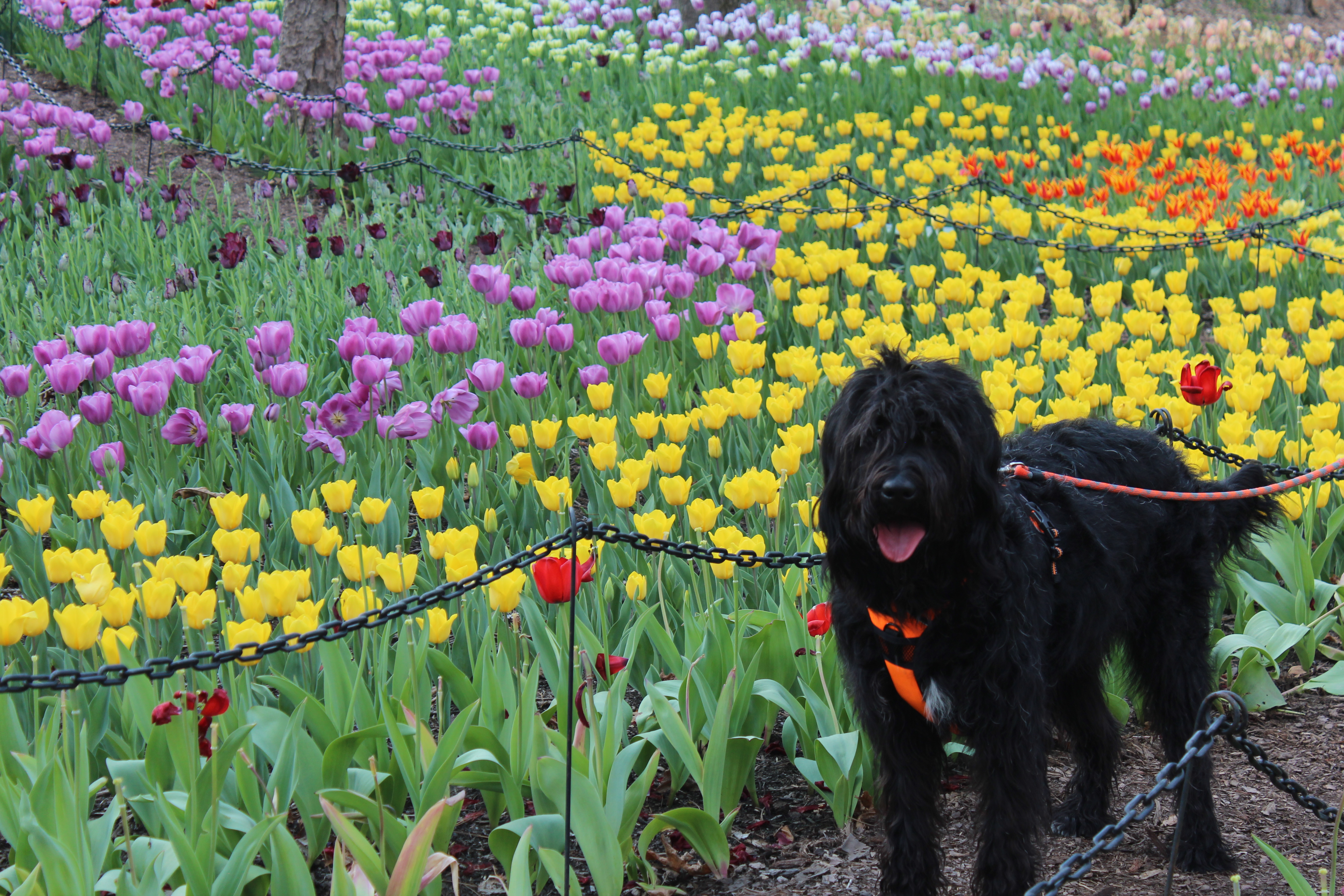
Fleece-coated Labradoodle Variant

Labradoodle coats are divided into three categories: wool, fleece, or hair.

Labradoodles' coat colors include chocolate, café, parchment, cream, gold, apricot, red, black, silver, chalk, lavender, and blueish gray. Coat patterns can be solid, white abstract markings, parti, phantom, or tri-coloured.

The Australian Cobberdog has single coat hair which is low to no shedding and produces minimal dander. This trait means that the dog is considered hypoallergenic. Contrary to the belief that dog hair is the cause of an allergy to dogs, allergies are primarily caused by a hypersensitivity to a protein found in a dog's saliva, dandruff and chafing skin. The Cobberdog has two principle coat types: fleece coats and wool coats. A fleece coat is a single coat of soft, thin fibres which appear silky and slightly wavy. The coat's fibres generally create soft clusters called staples. Fleece coats have minimal shedding and dander, making them minimally odorous and largely hypoallergenic. Fleece coats require regular grooming to prevent matting. Without regular brushing and consistent care the fleece coat is more susceptible to matting, the formation of dreadlocks, hair-borne conditions and the capture of dirt against the skin which can cause discomfort and/or chafing. The lack of shedding also necessitates frequent trimming of the dog's hair as the hairs continuously grow and do not naturally maintain coat length. A wool coat is a single coat of coarse, thick fibres which are grouped together as small, tight curls. Wool coats are non-shedding and low dander and they require attention similar to that of the fleece coat. A true wool coat was deemed as "highly undesirable" by the MDBA and has become increasingly rare in Cobberdogs. Instead of the original pure wool coat, the term has shifted to also apply to a curly variation of the fleece coat, again non-shedding and low dander, sometimes called the "spiral wool coat". This coat usually appears as multiple long and loose spirals which are considerably larger than the fleece coat's staples. This coat is similarly low odour and largely hypoallergenic. This coat is caused by the presence of both fleece and wool coat genes. The spiral wool coat, also called the curly fleece coat, is somewhat similar in appearance to the more common "straight" fleece coat and requires frequent grooming, trimming, and brushing in or to avoid matting. This type of coat, both true wool and curly fleece, requires closer and more frequent care than the aforementioned straight fleece coat.

=== Behavioral characteristics ===
The Cobberdog's original purpose for development was as an effort to breed a calm, compassionate and empathetic dog which is ideal for training as a therapy dog or service animal, the first pure breed with that as the initial purpose for breeding. Additionally, the hypoallergenic coat and low saliva production is meant to broaden the Cobberdog's usefulness as it allows the dog to be a companion to or visit individuals with allergies to dogs, dander, dog saliva, and who should avoid the presence of residual hairs left behind by shedding dogs.

Australian Cobberdogs are generally considered to be an intelligent breed which learns tricks and tasks more easily than most other breeds. Additionally, they are known to very rarely bite with an intent to harm. The Cobberdog barks less than most breeds and vocalization is generally limited to instances of extreme shock or distress. These characteristics, in addition to the breed's respectful and unimposing nature, make them particularly ideal for therapies involving individuals with difficulties interacting such as victims of trauma, certain individuals with autism spectrum disorder and a myriad of other socially sensitive groups.

Around other animals, the Cobberdog generally remains calm and unimposing. It is uncommon for an individual of the breed to be involved in a fight as a result of the dog's natural inclination to retreat from conflict. Oftentimes, the Cobberdog is uniquely capable of interacting with dogs which are generally incapable of cohabitation with other dogs. The Cobberdog can cohabitate in some circumstances with animals such as cats, birds or rodents, although the breed is generally very curious and should be supervised to avoid unintended harm or intrusion.

== Health ==
Labradoodles can have problems common to their parent breeds. Poodles and Labrador retrievers can have hip dysplasia. The parent breeds can also have a number of eye disorders.

=== Joint dysplasia ===
Elbow dysplasia is a known common issue in the parent breeds, similar to hip dysplasia. This issue becomes more prevalent as a result of rapid growth during the puppy stage.

=== Congenital eye diseases ===
One study has found that UK labradoodles have a higher incidence (4.6%) of multifocal retinal dysplasia (MRA) compared to Labrador retrievers. Cataracts are common as well (3.7%) but prevalence is comparable to that of Labradors.

=== Addison's disease ===
There is evidence of some occurrence of Addison's disease in the Australian labradoodle.

=== Ear infections ===
Labradoodles are very prone to ear infections due to their long floppy ears.

== See also ==
- Goldendoodle
- Cockapoo
