= Secretoglobin =

Identifiers
- Symbol: Secretoglobin
- Pfam: PF01099
- InterPro: IPR016126
- PROSITE: PS51311
- SCOP2: d1utra_ / SCOPe / SUPFAM
- CDD: cd00633
Available protein structures:
- PDB: IPR016126 PF01099 (ECOD; PDBsum)
- AlphaFold: IPR016126; PF01099

Secretoglobins (SCGBs) are a family of small, alpha-helical, disulfide linked, dimeric proteins found only in mammals. This family was formerly known as the Uteroglobin/Clara cell 10-kDa family, after the two aliases of its founding member Uteroglobin.

== Structure and function ==
The proteins are mostly alpha-helical, and the dimer is formed in an antiparallel way. The dimer interface features a cavity formed across the two monomers, which can accommodate small to medium sized ligands like steroids and phospholipids. The binding and release may be coupled with the redox state of the cystines, i.e. the presence of these disulfide bonds.

Many have regulatory functions.

== Classification ==
The family was classified by sequence homology into 6 subfamilies in 2006. The human and mouse genomes only contain the first three families, per a 2011 update. Not every family is monophyletic.

Subfamily		Group		Member		
Subfamily		Group		Symbol	Name	Ligand(s)
1	UGB	A	UGB	SCGB1A1	Uteroglobin (UGB); blastokinin, CCSP	phosphatidylcholine, phosphatidylinositol, PCB
1	UGB	B	ABPA-like	Scgb1b2 (rodent)		in general: steroid pheromones
1	UGB	C		SCGB1C1		
1	UGB	C		SCGB1C2		
1	UGB	D	Lipophilin A/B			
2		A	Mammaglobin	SCGB2A1	Mammaglobin-B; lipophilin-C	
2		A	Mammaglobin	SCGB2A2	Mammaglobin-A	
2		B	ABPBG-like	Scgb2b1 (rodent)		in general: steroid pheromones
3	UGB-like	A	UGB-like	SCGB3A1		
3	UGB-like	A	UGB-like	SCGB3A2		

Rat prostatein (rat prostatic steroid binding protein) is a three component, tetrameric protein complex built from three lipophilin-like genes in groups 2 and 3. Some sources describe it as the ortholog of lipophilin.

=== Extra subfamilies ===
Subfamilies 4 and 6 were originally described as found in human and mice, but they are now treated as duplicates of existing groups. Subfamily 5 is found in neither to begin with.

Subfamily 4 formerly included what is now known as group 1B and 2B as group 4A. Pairs of 1B/2B (ABP) genes are arranged head-to-head on the chromosome into "modules" that have been independently duplicated.

Subfamily 6 was supposed to include human and rat RYD5, now reassigned Scgb1c1.

Fel d 1 was supposed to be put into two subfamilies: chain 1 in subfamily 4, and chain 2 in subfamily 5. Although it is not mentioned in the 2011 update, InterPro matches suggest that CH1 is similar to 1B and CH2 is similar to 2B. Extra computational research confirms the similarity, invalidating subfamilies 4 and 5 fully.
