= Hypoallergenic dog breed =

Type of dog

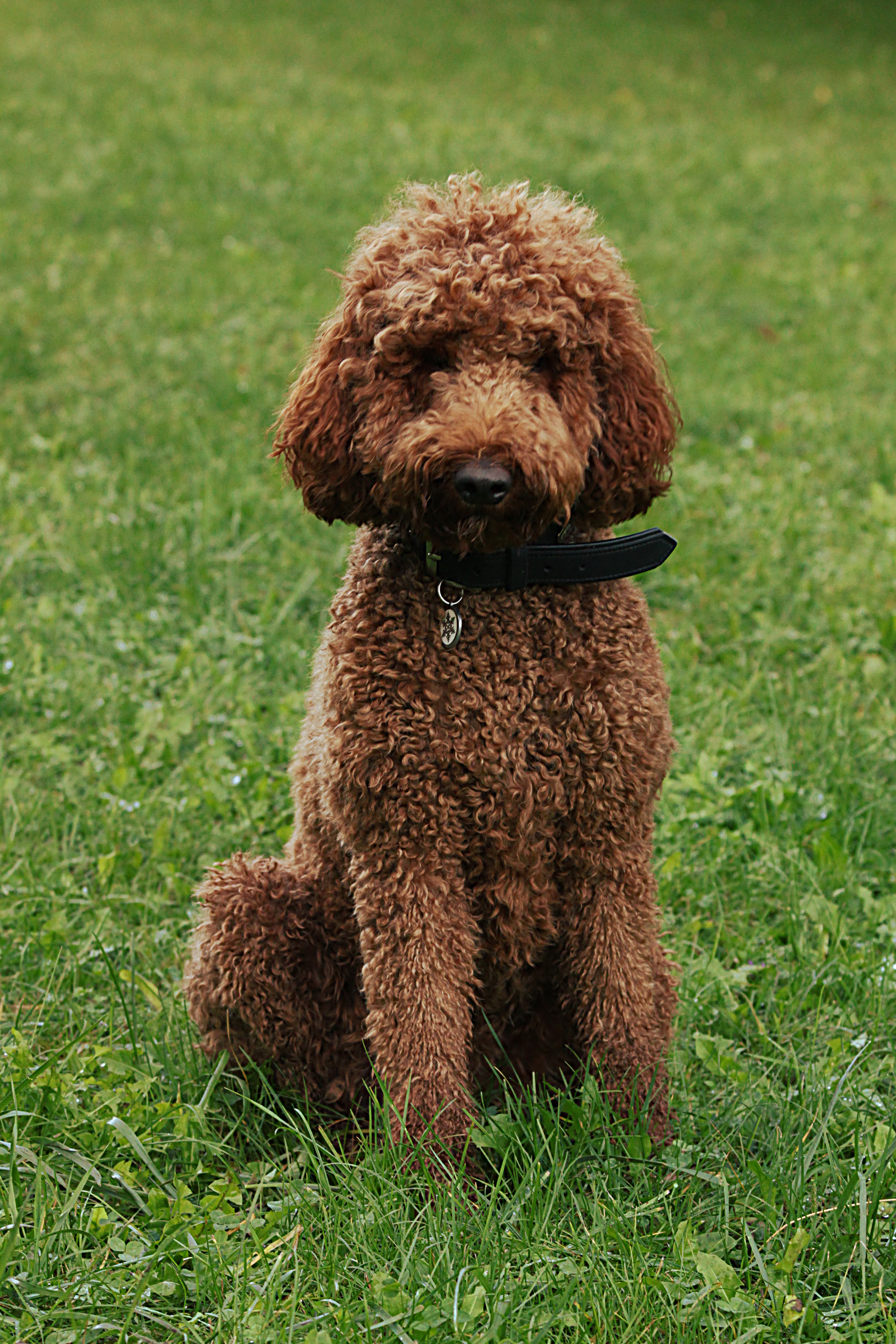
Poodles are well known for their minimally shedding, single coat, and are popular parents for designer dogs marketed as 'allergy-friendly'.

A hypoallergenic dog breed is a dog breed (or crossbreed) that is purportedly more compatible with allergic people than are other breeds. However, prominent allergen researchers have determined that there is no basis to the claims that certain breeds are hypoallergenic and, while allergen levels vary among individual dogs, the breed is not a significant factor.

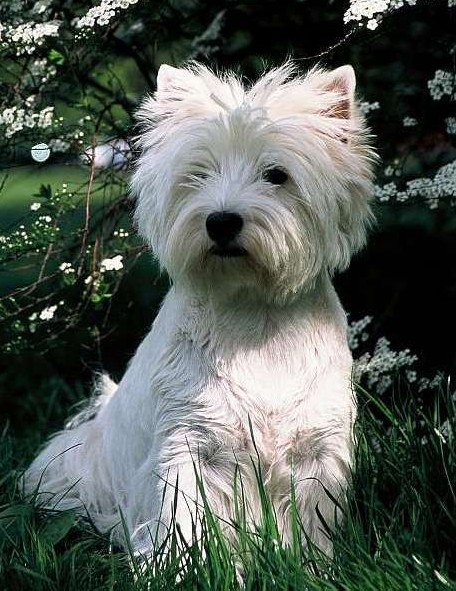
Another purported hypoallergenic dog breed, the West Highland White Terrier.

== Scientific findings ==
Though some studies suggest the possible existence of hypoallergenic dog breeds, there is too much variability to conclude that such a breed exists. According to researchers, claims about the existence of hypoallergenic dog breeds may have been fueled by unsubstantiated articles on the internet. The significant allergens are proteins found in the dog's saliva and dander. Pet dander is a cause of allergic rhinitis for as much as 30% of the U.S. population.

Some studies have suggested that the production of the allergen, and therefore human allergenic reaction, varies by breed, yet more recent scientific findings indicate that there are no significant differences between breeds in the generation of these allergens. One study found hypoallergenic breeds to have significantly more allergen in their coats than non-hypoallergenic breeds and no differences in the allergen levels in the air or on the floor.

Breeds that shed less are more likely to be hypoallergenic, since the dog's dander and saliva stick to the hair and are not released into the environment. However, protein expression levels play a major role and amount of shedding alone does not determine degree of allergic reaction. "Even if you get a hairless dog, it's still going to produce the allergen," states Dr. Wanda Phipatanakul, chair of the Indoor Allergen Committee for the American Academy of Allergy, Asthma, and Immunology.

If a person is allergic, they may be best able to tolerate a specific dog, possibly of one of the hypoallergenic breeds. Dr. Thomas A. Platts-Mills, head of the Asthma and Allergic Disease Center at the University of Virginia, explained that there are cases in which a specific dog (not breed) might be better tolerated by a specific person, for unknown reasons. "We think there really are differences in protein production between dogs that may help one patient and not another," Dr. Platts-Mills said. Other breeds have come under scrutiny and Emma Charles, DVM discusses whether or not any particular breed of dog can be ever classed as hypoallergic.

All dogs shed, and all dogs produce dander and saliva in some degree. As noted above, the amount of the allergenic protein present on the dander and in saliva varies by breed, but also by individual. The amount of the allergen can be reduced or eliminated in individual dogs by treatments such as bathing. But for most breeds, when not regularly bathed, even a dog who sheds very little or has little dander can trigger a reaction in a sensitive person.

== Effect of size ==
Size may be a factor in determining hypoallergenicity. It is possible that the total body surface area of the dog is more indicative of reduced production of allergens than its breed.

Smaller dogs will also leave fewer environmental pollutants containing dog dander and dog allergens (reduced fecal matter, urine and saliva). Dogs may leave behind urine, saliva and fecal matter as allergen sources. Dogs with access to the outdoors may introduce outdoor allergens such as mold and pollen, with larger animals tracking in more of these allergens. It is well established that most individuals with dog allergy also suffer with additional environmental allergies. Individuals with dog allergy may also be at increased risk for human protein hypersensitivity with cross-reactivity of dog dander allergen and human seminal fluid.

== Expert recommendations ==
Researchers have shown that frequently bathing dogs reduces the amount of allergen-related protein on the fur or hair of the dog and the amount of airborne allergen. Bathing a dog at least twice a week will minimize or even eliminate the reaction of an allergic person to a dog.

Frequent cleaning and vacuuming of the home, using air filters, restricting the dog to certain rooms, and adopting a small dog that can easily be given frequent baths are all recommended by the Humane Society of the United States to control allergens. Scientific research has repeatedly shown that good cleaning practices in the home remove allergens from the environment.

Many allergists suggest that a dog should not be introduced to the environment of a dog-allergic individual. While "allergy shots" can reduce many individuals' dog-allergic reactions, the most common approach remains avoidance.

Additionally, the proteins present in bodily fluids of one sex of dogs can cause an allergy while the other sex does not. For example, some people are only allergic to a prostate protein, which means they would be allergic to only male dogs.

A 1997 study published in The Journal of Allergy and Clinical Immunology suggests early introduction of pets to the home may reduce the likelihood of developing sensitization. There are reports of individuals who will become less sensitive with continued exposure to a pet in the environment. But allergists warn that pet owners cannot rely on a breed being non-allergenic just because a particular allergic pet owner can tolerate a specific dog of that breed.

== See also ==
- Coat (dog)
- Hypoallergenic cats
- List of dog breeds
- List of allergies
