= Major urinary proteins =

Proteins found in the urine and other secretions of many animals

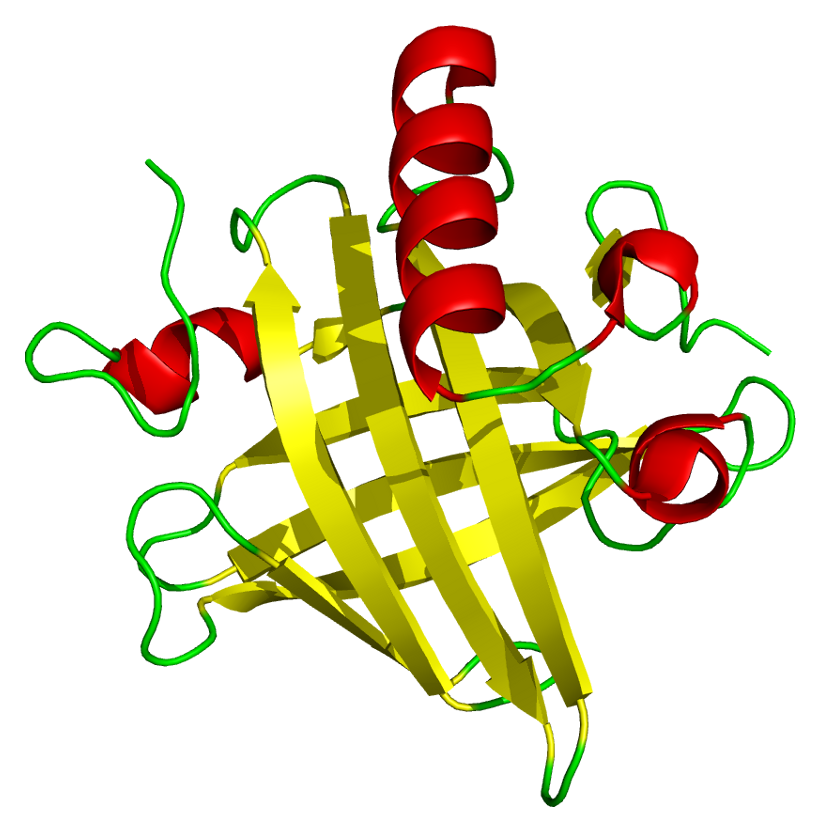
Tertiary structure of a mouse major urinary protein. The protein has eight beta sheets (yellow) arranged in a beta barrel open at one end, with alpha helices (red) at both the amino- and carboxyl termini. The structure is resolved from Protein Data Bank entry PDB: 1i04. Find all instances of this protein in the PDB

Major urinary proteins (Mups), also known as α_{2}u-globulins, are a subfamily of proteins found in abundance in the urine and other secretions of many animals. Mups provide a small range of identifying information about the donor animal, when detected by the vomeronasal organ of the receiving animal. They belong to a larger family of proteins known as lipocalins. Mups are encoded by a cluster of genes, located adjacent to each other on a single stretch of DNA, that varies greatly in number between species: from at least 21 functional genes in mice to none in humans. Mup proteins form a characteristic glove shape, encompassing a ligand-binding pocket that accommodates specific small organic chemicals.

Urinary proteins were first reported in rodents in 1932, during studies by Thomas Addis into the cause of proteinuria. They are potent human allergens and are largely responsible for a number of animal allergies, including to cats, horses and rodents. Their endogenous function within an animal is unknown but may involve regulating energy expenditure. However, as secreted proteins they play multiple roles in chemical communication between animals, functioning as pheromone transporters and stabilizers in rodents and pigs. Mups can also act as protein pheromones themselves. They have been demonstrated to promote aggression in male mice, and one specific Mup protein found in male mouse urine is sexually attractive to female mice. Mups can also function as signals between different species: mice display an instinctive fear response on the detection of Mups derived from predators such as cats and rats.

== Discovery ==
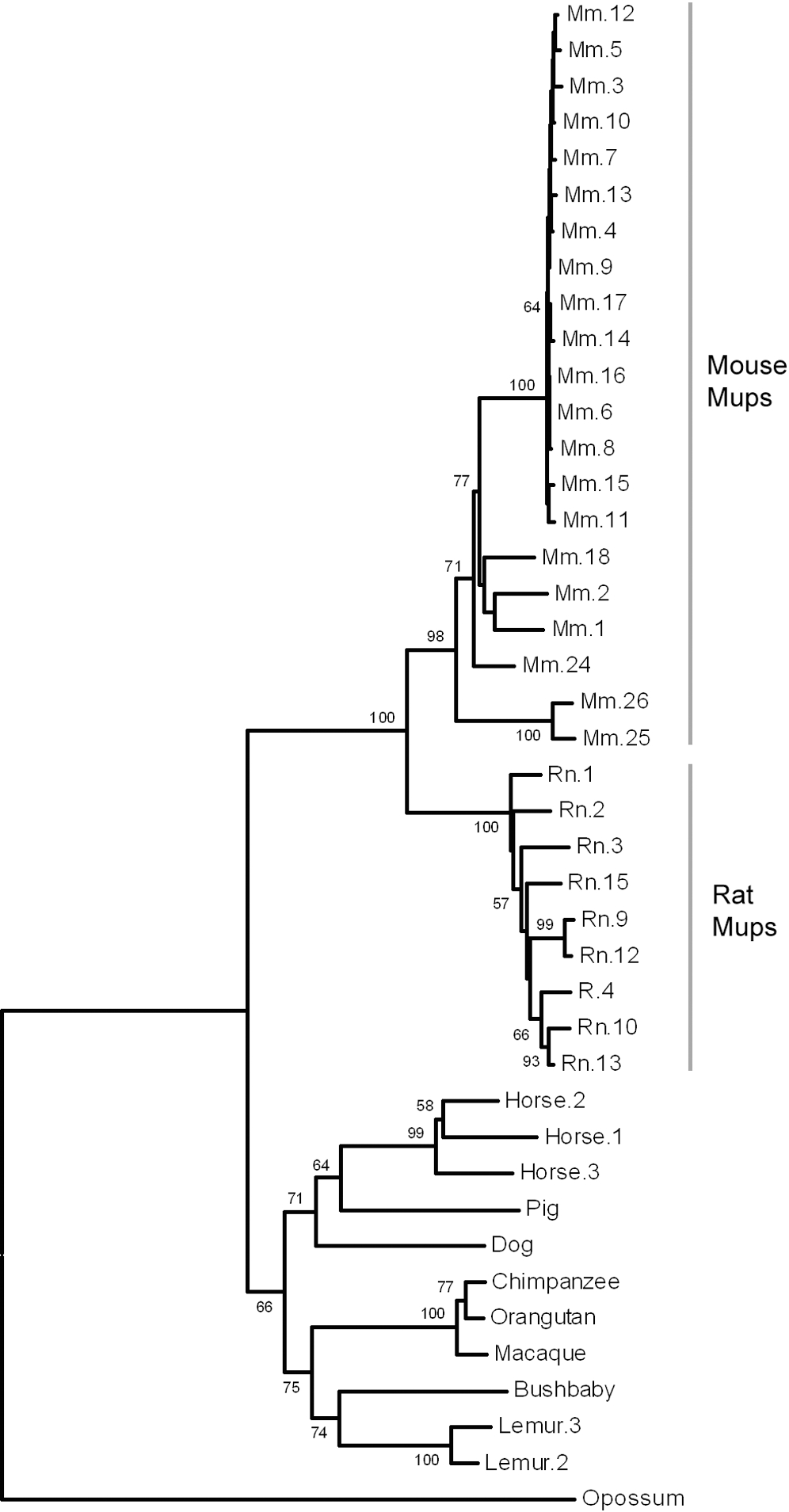
Phylogeny of Mup coding sequences in mammals. The repeatability of the reconstruction was tested by bootstrapping. Interior branches with bootstrap support > 50% are shown.

Humans in good health excrete urine that is largely free of protein. Therefore, since 1827 physicians and scientists have been interested in proteinuria, the excess of protein in human urine, as an indicator of kidney disease. (Note: In that year Richard Bright first related kidney disease, later to become known as Bright's disease, with albuminous urine.) To better understand the etiology of proteinuria, some scientists attempted to study the phenomenon in laboratory animals. Between 1932 and 1933 a number of scientists, including Thomas Addis, independently reported the surprising finding that some healthy rodents have protein in their urine. However, it was not until the 1960s that the major urinary proteins of mice and rats were first described in detail. It was found that the proteins are primarily made in the liver of males and secreted through the kidneys into the urine in large quantities (milligrams per day).

Since they were named, the proteins have been found to be differentially expressed in other glands that secrete products directly into the external environment. These include lacrimal, parotid, submaxillary, sublingual, preputial and mammary glands. In some species, such as cats and pigs, Mups appear not to be expressed in urine at all and are mainly found in saliva. Sometimes the term urinary Mups (uMups) is used to distinguish those Mups expressed in urine from those in other tissues.

== Mup genes ==
Between 1979 and 1981, it was estimated that Mups are encoded by a gene family of between 15 and 35 genes and pseudogenes in the mouse and by an estimated 20 genes in the rat. In 2008 a more precise number of Mup genes in a range of species was determined by analyzing the DNA sequence of whole genomes.

=== Rodents ===
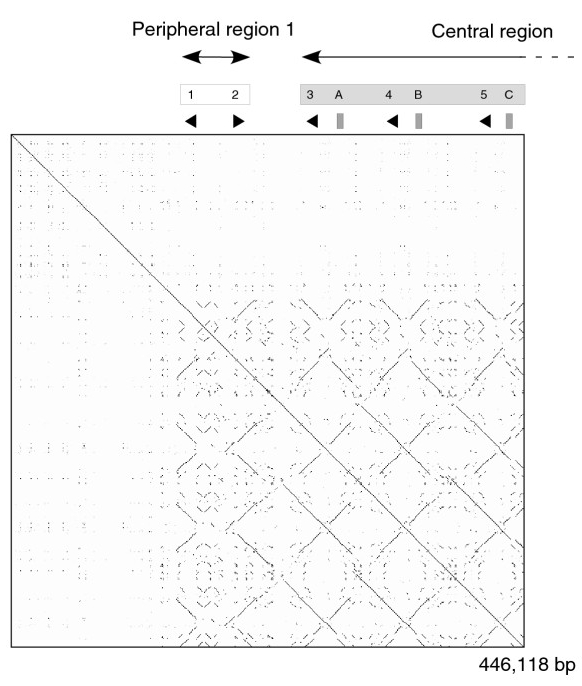
A dot plot showing self-similarity within the mouse Mup cluster. The main diagonal represents the sequence's alignment with itself; lines off the main diagonal represent similar or repetitive patterns within the cluster. The pattern differs between the older, peripheral Class A and the newer, central Class B Mups.

The mouse reference genome has at least 21 distinct Mup genes (with open reading frames) and a further 21 Mup pseudogenes (with reading frames disrupted by a nonsense mutation or an incomplete gene duplication). They are all clustered together, arrayed side by side across 1.92 megabases of DNA on chromosome 4. The 21 functional genes have been divided into two sub-classes based on position and sequence similarity: 6 peripheral Class A Mups and 15 central Class B Mups. The central Class B Mup gene cluster formed through a number of sequential duplications from one of the Class A Mups. As all the Class B genes are almost identical to each other, researchers have concluded that these duplications occurred very recently in mouse evolution. Indeed, the repetitive structure of these central Mup genes means they are likely to be unstable and may vary in number among wild mice. The Class A Mups are more different from each other and are therefore likely to be more stable, older genes, but what, if any, functional differences the classes have are unknown. The similarity between the genes makes the region difficult to study using current DNA sequencing technology. Consequently, the Mup gene cluster is one of the few parts of the mouse whole genome sequence with gaps remaining, and further genes may remain undiscovered.

Rat urine also contains homologous urinary proteins; although they were originally given a different name, α2_{u}-globulins, they have since become known as rat Mups. Rats have 9 distinct Mup genes and a further 13 pseudogenes clustered together across 1.1 megabases of DNA on chromosome 5. Like in mice, the cluster formed by multiple duplications. However, this occurred independently of the duplications in mice, meaning that both rodent species expanded their Mup gene families separately, but in parallel.

=== Nonrodents ===
Most other mammals studied, including the pig, cow, cat, dog, bushbaby, macaque, chimpanzee and orangutan, have a single Mup gene. Some, however, have an expanded number: horses have three Mup genes, and gray mouse lemurs have at least two. Insects, fish, amphibia, birds and marsupials appear to have disrupted synteny at the chromosomal position of the Mup gene cluster, suggesting the gene family may be specific to placental mammals. Humans are the only placental mammals found not to have any active Mup genes; instead, they have a single Mup pseudogene containing a mutation that causes missplicing, rendering it dysfunctional.

== Function ==
=== Transport proteins ===
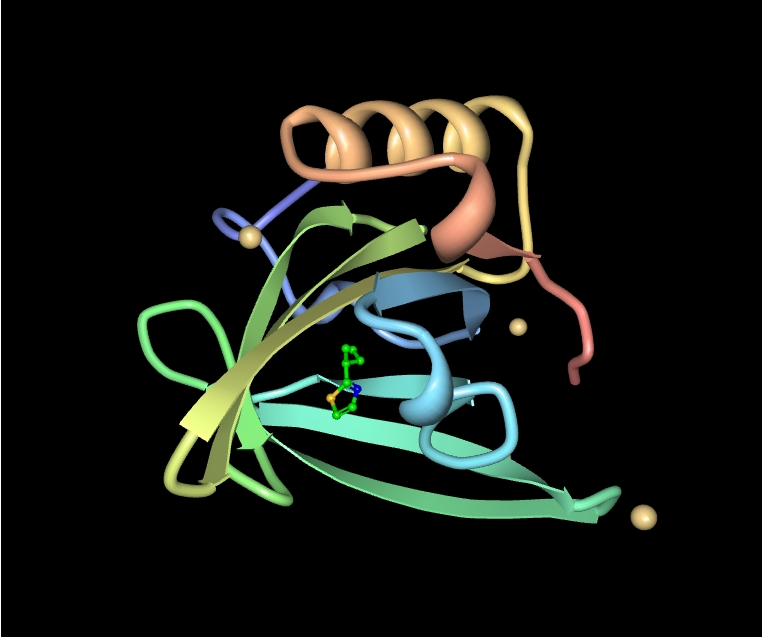
Mouse major urinary proteins bind 2-sec-butyl-4,5-dihydrothiazole (SBT), a mouse pheromone. The beta barrel forms a pocket, in which the SBT molecule is tightly bound. The structure is resolved from PDB: 1MUP.

Mups are members of a large family of low-molecular weight (~19 kDa) proteins known as lipocalins. They have a characteristic structure of eight beta sheets arranged in an anti-parallel beta barrel open on one face, with alpha helices at both ends. Consequently, they form a characteristic glove shape, encompassing a cup-like pocket that binds small organic chemicals with high affinity. A number of these ligands bind to mouse Mups, including 2-sec-butyl-4,5-dihydrothiazole (abbreviated as SBT or DHT), 6-hydroxy-6-methyl-3-heptanone (HMH) and 2,3 dihydro-exo-brevicomin (DHB). These are all urine-specific chemicals that have been shown to act as pheromones—molecular signals excreted by one individual that trigger an innate behavioural response in another member of the same species. Mouse Mups have also been shown to function as pheromone stabilizers, providing a slow release mechanism that extends the potency of volatile pheromones in male urine scent marks. Given the diversity of Mups in rodents, it was originally thought that different Mups may have differently shaped binding pockets and therefore bind different pheromones. However, detailed studies found that most variable sites are located on the surface of the proteins and appear to have little effect on ligand binding.

Rat Mups bind different small chemicals. The most common ligand is 1-Chlorodecane, with 2-methyl-N-phenyl-2-propenamide, hexadecane and 2,6,11-trimethyl decane found to be less prominent. Rat Mups also bind limonene-1,2-epoxide, resulting in a disease of the host's kidney, hyaline-droplet nephropathy, that progresses to cancer. Other species do not develop this disorder because their Mups do not bind that particular chemical. Accordingly, when transgenic mice were engineered to express the rat Mup, their kidneys developed the disease. The Mup found in pigs, named salivary lipocalin (SAL), is expressed in the salivary gland of males where it tightly binds androstenone and androstenol, both pheromones that cause female pigs to assume a mating stance.

Isothermal titration calorimetry studies performed with Mups and associated ligands (pyrazines, alcohols, thiazolines, 6-hydroxy-6-methyl-3-heptanone, and N-phenylnapthylamine,) revealed an unusual binding phenomena. The active site has been found to be suboptimally hydrated, resulting in ligand binding being driven by enthalpic dispersion forces. This is contrary to most other proteins, which exhibit entropy-driven binding forces from the reorganisation of water molecules. This unusual process has been termed the nonclassical hydrophobic effect.

=== Pheromones ===
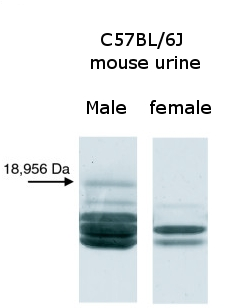
The Mups in C57BL/6J mouse urine analyzed by native gel electrophoresis

Studies have sought to find the precise function of Mups in pheromone communication. Mup proteins have been shown to promote puberty and accelerate the estrus cycle in female mice, inducing the Vandenbergh and Whitten effects. However, in both cases the Mups had to be presented to the female dissolved in male urine, indicating that the protein requires some urinary context to function. In 2007 Mups normally found in male mouse urine were made in transgenic bacteria, and therefore created devoid of the chemicals they normally bind. These Mups were shown to be sufficient to promote aggressive behaviour in males, even in the absence of urine. In addition, Mups made in bacteria were found to activate olfactory sensory neurons in the vomeronasal organ (VNO), a subsystem of the nose known to detect pheromones via specific sensory receptors, of mice and rats. Together, this demonstrated that Mup proteins can act as pheromones themselves, independent of their ligands.

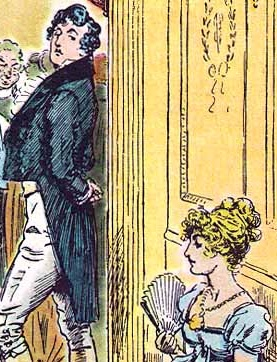
Fitzwilliam Darcy was the inspiration for the naming of darcin, the Mup that attracts female mice to male urine.

Consistent with a role in male-male aggression, adult male mice secrete significantly more Mups into their urine than females, juveniles or castrated male mice. The precise mechanism driving this difference between the sexes is complex, but at least three hormones—testosterone, growth hormone and thyroxine—are known to positively influence the production of Mups in mice. Wild house mouse urine contains variable combinations of four to seven distinct Mup proteins per mouse. Some inbred laboratory mouse strains, such as BALB/c and C57BL/6, also have different proteins expressed in their urine. However, unlike wild mice, different individuals from the same strain express the same protein pattern, an artifact of many generations of inbreeding. One unusual Mup is less variable than the others: it is consistently produced by a high proportion of wild male mice and is almost never found in female urine. When this Mup was made in bacteria and used in behavioural testing, it was found to attract female mice. Other Mups were tested but did not have the same attractive qualities, suggesting the male-specific Mup acts as a sex pheromone. Scientists named this Mup darcin (Mup20, Q5FW60) as a humorous reference to Fitzwilliam Darcy, the romantic hero from Pride and Prejudice. Taken together, the complex patterns of Mups produced has the potential to provide a range of information about the donor animal, such as gender, fertility, social dominance, age, genetic diversity or kinship. Wild mice (unlike laboratory mice that are genetically identical and which therefore also have identical patterns of Mups in the urine) have individual patterns of Mup expression in their urine that act as a "barcode" to uniquely identify the owner of a scent mark.

In the house mouse, the major MUP gene cluster provides a highly polymorphic scent signal of genetic identity. Wild mice breeding freely in semi-natural enclosures showed inbreeding avoidance. This avoidance resulted from a strong deficit in successful matings between mice sharing both MUP haplotypes (complete match). In another study, using white-footed mice, it was found that when mice derived from wild populations were inbred, there was reduced survival when such mice were reintroduced into a natural habitat. These findings suggest that inbreeding reduces fitness, and that scent signal recognition has evolved in mice as a means of avoiding inbreeding depression.

=== Kairomones ===
In addition to serving as social cues between members of the same species, Mups can act as kairomones—chemical signals that transmit information between species. Mice are instinctively afraid of the smell of their natural predators, including cats and rats. This occurs even in laboratory mice that have been isolated from predators for hundreds of generations. When the chemical cues responsible for the fear response were purified from cat saliva and rat urine, two homologous protein signals were identified: Fel d 4 (Felis domesticus allergen 4; Q5VFH6), the product of the cat Mup gene, and Rat n 1 (Rattus norvegicus allergen 1; P02761), the product of the rat Mup13 gene. Mice are fearful of these Mups even when they are made in bacteria, but mutant animals that are unable to detect the Mups showed no fear of rats, demonstrating their importance in initiating fearful behaviour. It is not known exactly how Mups from different species initiate disparate behaviours, but mouse Mups and predator Mups have been shown to activate unique patterns of sensory neurons in the nose of recipient mice. This implies the mouse perceives them differently, via distinct neural circuits. The pheromone receptors responsible for Mup detection are also unknown, though they are thought be members of the V2R receptor class.

=== Metabolism ===
While the detection of Mups excreted by other animals has been well studied, the functional role in the producing animal is less clear. However, in 2009, Mups were shown to be associated with the regulation of energy expenditure in mice. Scientists found that genetically induced obese, diabetic mice produce thirty times less Mup RNA than their lean siblings. When they delivered Mup protein directly into the bloodstream of these mice, they observed an increase in energy expenditure, physical activity and body temperature and a corresponding decrease in glucose intolerance and insulin resistance. They propose that Mups' beneficial effects on energy metabolism occurs by enhancing mitochondrial function in skeletal muscle. Another study found Mups were reduced in diet-induced obese mice. In this case, the presence of Mups in the bloodstream of mice restricted glucose production by directly inhibiting the expression of genes in the liver.

== Allergens ==
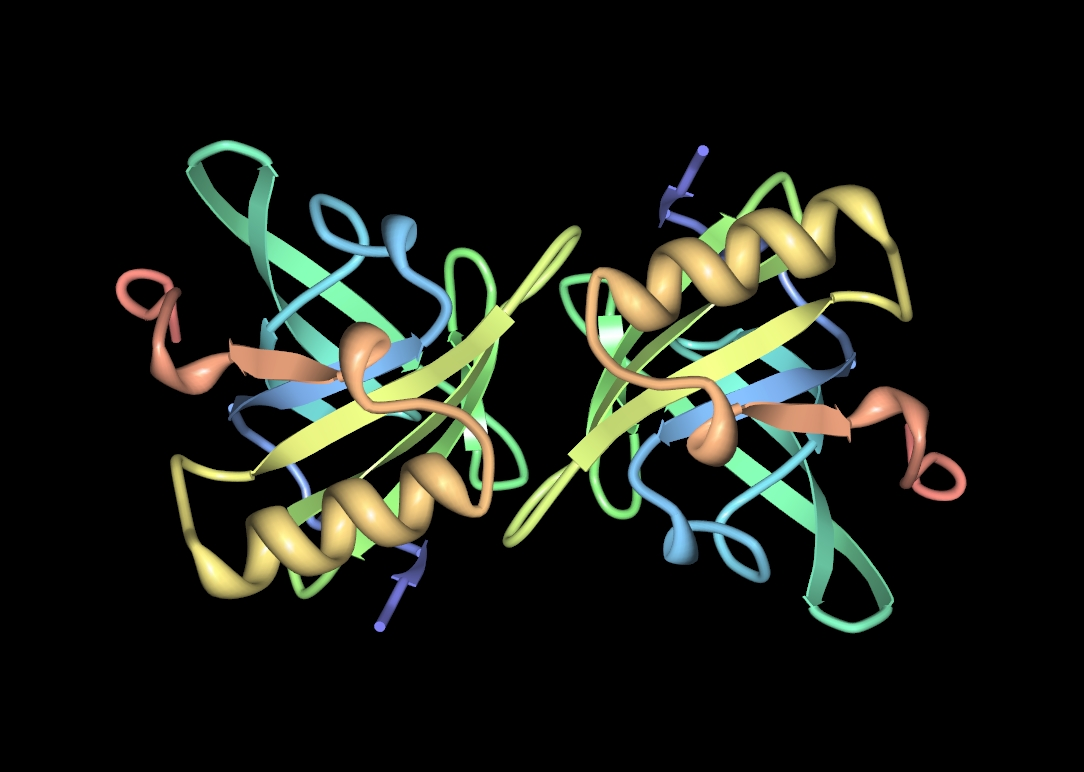
The three-dimensional structure of Equ c 1, shown in the crystallized dimeric form. The structure is resolved from PDB: 1EW3.

Along with other members of the lipocalin protein family, major urinary proteins can be potent allergens to humans. The reason for this is not known; however, molecular mimicry between Mups and structurally similar human lipocalins has been proposed as a possible explanation. The protein product of the mouse Mup6 and Mup2 genes (previously mistaken as Mup17 due to the similarity among mouse MUPs), known as Mus m 1, Ag1 or MA1, accounts for much of the allergenic properties of mouse urine. The protein is extremely stable in the environment; studies have found 95% of inner city homes and 82% of all types of homes in the United States have detectable levels in at least one room. Similarly, Rat n 1 is a known human allergen. A US study found its presence in 33% of inner city homes, and 21% of occupants were sensitized to the allergen. Exposure and sensitization to rodent Mup proteins is considered a risk factor for childhood asthma and is a leading cause of laboratory animal allergy (LAA)—an occupational disease of laboratory animal technicians and scientists. One study found that two-thirds of laboratory workers who had developed asthmatic reactions to animals had antibodies to Rat n 1.

Mup genes from other mammals also encode allergenic proteins, for example Fel d 4 is primarily produced in the submandibular salivary gland and is deposited onto dander as the cat grooms itself. A study found that 63% of cat allergic people have antibodies against the protein. Most had higher titres of antibodies against Fel d 4 than against Fel d 1, another prominent cat allergen. Likewise, Equ c 1 (Equus caballus allergen 1; Q95182) is the protein product of a horse Mup gene that is found in the liver, sublingual and submaxillary salivary glands. It is responsible for about 80% of the antibody response in patients who are chronically exposed to horse allergens.

== See also ==
- Cis-vaccenyl acetate, an insect aggression pheromone
- Major histocompatibility complex, peptides also implicated in individual recognition in mice
- Proteins produced and secreted by the liver
