= SCGB1D2 =

Protein-coding gene in the species Homo sapiens

Identifiers
- Aliases: SCGB1D2, LIPB, LPHB, LPNB, secretoglobin, family 1D member 2, secretoglobin family 1D member 2
- External IDs: OMIM: 615061; GeneCards: SCGB1D2

Gene location (Human)
Chr.	Chromosome 11 (human)
Band	11q12.3	Start	62,242,239 bp
Band	11q12.3	End	62,244,812 bp
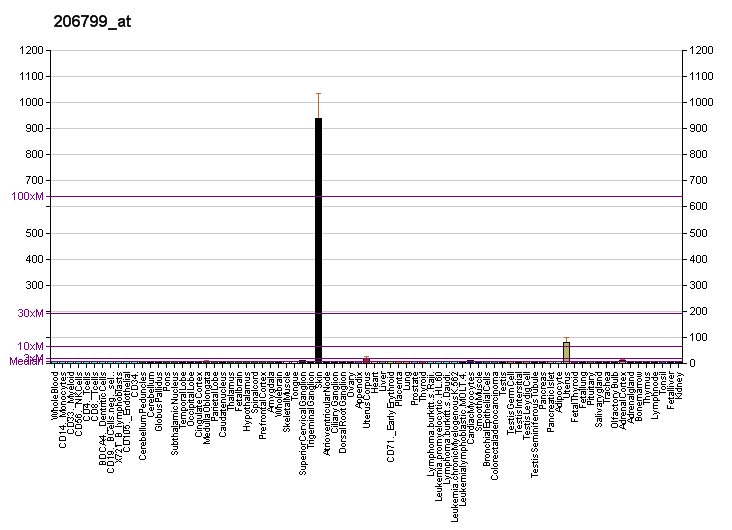
RNA expression pattern
Bgee	Human / Mouse (ortholog); Top expressed in: right uterine tube; skin of thigh; epithelium of lactiferous gland; corpus epididymis; skin of arm; lactiferous duct; skin of hip; skin of abdomen; endometrium; olfactory zone of nasal mucosa / n/a; More reference expression data
BioGPS	More reference expression data
Orthologs
Databases	NCBI: entry; OMA: entry
Species	Human	Mouse
Entrez	10647	n/a
Ensembl	ENSG00000124935	n/a
UniProt	O95969	n/a
RefSeq (mRNA)	NM_006551	n/a
RefSeq (protein)	NP_006542	n/a
Location (UCSC)	Chr 11: 62.24 – 62.24 Mb	n/a
PubMed search		n/a
- Wikidata
View/Edit Human

Secretoglobin family 1D member 2 is a protein that in humans is encoded by the SCGB1D2 gene.

== Function ==
The protein encoded by this gene is a member of the lipophilin subfamily, part of the uteroglobin superfamily, and is an ortholog of prostatein, the major secretory glycoprotein of the rat ventral prostate gland. Lipophilin gene products are widely expressed in normal tissues, especially in endocrine-responsive organs. Assuming that human lipophilins are the functional counterparts of prostatein, they may be transcriptionally regulated by steroid hormones, with the ability to bind androgens, other steroids and possibly bind and concentrate estramustine, a chemotherapeutic agent widely used for prostate cancer. Although the gene has been reported to be on chromosome 10, this sequence appears to be from a cluster of genes on chromosome 11 that includes mammaglobin 2.

SCGB1D2 expression is high in mammary tissue, and is sometimes used for identification and detection of disseminated breast cancer cells.
