= Lifestyle Pets =

American biotechnology company

- Industry: Animal breeding
- Key people: Simon Brodie (founder)
- Footnotes formerly Allerca

Lifestyle Pets, formerly Allerca, was a Delaware-based company which in the mid-2000s claimed to have bred hypoallergenic cats, although it was later revealed that the company's founder had previously engaged in multiple fraudulent enterprises.

According to company literature, through selective breeding the company achieved Savannah cats with significantly reduced levels of a particular protein that humans suffer allergic reactions to. The journal Nature reported in September 2006 that in an Allerca-funded study, Sheldon Spector, a clinical allergy expert at the University of California, Los Angeles, found the company's cats to be less allergy-inducing than the control. However, neither the study nor its underlying data have been published, and Spector himself advises caution as regards his study's interpretation as he used an experimental setup that is generally regarded as less than reliable.

A July 2006 article in the San Diego Union-Tribune reported that no details about the cats have been released, nor have there been any peer-reviewed studies published about the company's work. Cat experts also questioned whether the company's breeding model—stated at the time to be up to 10,000 cats by 2009—was viable. Time named the company's cats among its list of Best Inventions for 2006. Allerca refuses to provide its kittens to clients whose allergy test results "indicate a level that includes HIGH". A cat based on the domestic shorthair cost US$6,950, while ones based on the Siamese and Ashera cost $16,900 and $26,950, respectively.

In February 2006, Allerca was evicted from its San Diego headquarters, an address that doubled as the founder Simon Brodie's home. Brodie's previous businesses have "left behind unhappy clients, unpaid employees, debts, lawsuits, court judgments and liens...." The company Transgenic Pets sued Allerca and Brodie for theft of trade secrets and business plans. Allerca settled. The settlement agreed that Allerca would not re-enter the genetically engineered allergen-free cat market until May 31, 2006.

For a while, Allerca offered a franchising program, possibly in violation of California law. Reports from Allerca indicate that they accepted at least partial payment from potential franchisees.

The company announced that on January 1, 2010, they would cease their breeding activities; however, their website remains active, and recent online complaints suggest that they are still in business. A report by ABC News in July 2013 maintains that the cats sold by Lifestyle Pets are no more hypoallergenic than any other cat.

== Fel d 1 ==
Most human cat allergies are caused by Fel d 1. Allerca (and earlier, Geneticas) scientists tried to delete or disable the gene. The company states it has discovered a breed of cat with a mutant version of the protein that does not induce an allergic response. Since a number of Fel d 1 alleles are known and documented whereas it is presently impossible to deduce allergenicity from their DNA or protein sequence alone, the alleged cats could exist, but their hypoallergenicity has not been proven.

== Secrecy and lack of peer review ==
Lifestyle Pets never submitted their scientific claims for peer review. In addition, the company was quite secretive. In a 2006 interview with the San Diego Union-Tribune, the CEO at the time would not say where the company was located, how it was funded, how many people it employed, how many cats it had produced, or even where the cats were housed.

== Founder's background ==
In 1994, Simon Brodie was convicted of seven counts of false accounting in the UK and sentenced to approximately two years in prison in connection with the collapse of a hot-air balloon company named Cloudhoppers. The San Diego Union-Tribune reported that Brodie planned to sell franchises at £200,000 each, but instead defrauded consumers and ran up hundreds of thousands of pounds in debts.

In 1999, Brodie incorporate Cerentis LLC in Delaware, United States, and the company sold software training packages. Peter Wood, 40, of Essex, England, purchased one such package for more than $50,000 with the understanding that he would receive training and then an employment offer. He did receive training at a California company named Alphalogix, but Brodie disappeared before the three-week course was completed. According to Los Angeles County court records, Brodie also failed to pay Alphalogix $30,600 in training fees. Mr. Wood said, "He's an extremely accomplished con man. He's obviously very good at what we call smoke and mirrors. He portrays a real professional company. But there's no depth to it at all."

Other Brodie-affiliated companies have included Integra Associates, Samba Wireless, Geneticas Life Sciences, ForeverPet, Genetiate, GeneSentinel, and Cyntegra.

== Failure to deliver ==
Discussions on forums and blogs continue to debate the status of this company and whether it is "vaporware". This has given rise to at least one web site complaining that the animal has not been provided as promised. A report page has been opened at the Better Business Bureau of Wilmington, Delaware. It shows the current rating as "Unsatisfactory." Reports of customers receiving their Allerca GD kitten are sporadic, but they can be found on the web.

In 2009, a man filed a lawsuit against Allerca for return of $7900 he paid for a hypoallergenic cat. Delivery was initially promised in eight months, but after repeated delays of the promised delivery date through 2008 and 2009, and a statement in March 2009 that the delivery scheduled had been affected by "decreased kitten production," the customer requested return of his money.

Another customer who did not receive a cat went to the news media from Live Oak, California, in 2009.

The company announced that they would stop taking orders for new kittens at the end of 2009 and instead focus on "veterinary diagnostic products," and that they would continue fulfilling previous orders through 2010 and 2011.

== Ashera cats ==
Lifestyle Pets also markets a hybrid cat under the name "Ashera." Several of the cats sold under the Ashera name were actually of the Savannah cat breed.
