= Thomas Addis =

Scottish physician-scientist

- Born: 27 July 1881; Edinburgh, Scotland
- Died: 4 June 1949 (aged 67)
- Education: University of Edinburgh Medical School
- Occupation: Physician-scientist
- Spouse: Elesa Bolton Partridge
- Children: Elesa, Jean
- Parent(s): Thomas Chalmers Addis; Cornelia Beers-Campbell

Thomas Addis Jr. (27 July 1881 – 4 June 1949) was a Scottish physician-scientist from Edinburgh who made important contributions to the understanding of how blood clots work. He was a pioneer in the field of nephrology, the branch of internal medicine that deals with diseases of the kidney. Addis described the pathogenesis of haemophilia in 1911 and was the first to demonstrate that normal plasma could correct the defect in haemophilia.

== Biography ==
Addis was the son of Thomas Chalmers Addis, a clerk at the local branch of the Inland Revenue Service, and Cornelia Beers-Campbell, who married in Hoboken, New York, in 1880, but he was born in Edinburgh. Significant influences in his childhood were his grandfather, the Rev Dr Thomas Addis DD, Minister at Morningside Free Kirk, and his grandfather's assistant, the Very Rev Dr Alexander Martin (who came to lead the movement within the Free Kirk for reunification with the Established Church of Scotland). Addis studied medicine in his native Edinburgh, at the Institute of Pathology of Berlin Charité, and in Heidelberg. He graduated from the University of Edinburgh Medical School with an MB in 1905 and an MD in 1908.

In 1911, he took up a professorship at Stanford University, where he remained until his death in 1949. Addis married Elesa Bolton Partridge in 1913. They had two daughters, Elesa and Jean. By way of his daughter Jean, Addis is the great-grandfather of Gavin Newsom, the current governor of California.

Besides his studies in haemophilia, Addis made many contributions to the understanding of bile pigment metabolism. His investigations into kidney function led to the birth of modern renal physiology. Addis developed a means of measuring the number of red blood cells, white blood cells, epithelial cells, casts, and the protein content in urine specimens, a test used in the diagnosis and management of kidney disease. Towards the end of his life Addis began to study laboratory rats as a model of proteinuria, and was among the first people to note the presence of rodent major urinary proteins.

Writing in Nephrology Dialysis Transplantation, Roland Schmitt et al. assessed Addis's contribution to medical science this way: "Since the times of Thomas Addis and other pioneers, no physical examination is said to be complete without the doctor looking at the patient's urine, grossly and under the microscope."

At the end of his career, Stanford University took away Addis's laboratory, perhaps on account of his leftist political views. He supported the loyalists in the Spanish Revolution, and was chairman of the San Francisco chapter of the Spanish Refugee Appeal, an organization that aided refugees from Franco's Spain. Addis toured the Soviet Union in 1935 and came away impressed by the communist country's medical accomplishments. He was friends with Harry Bridges and other leftwingers. Addis was chairman of the San Francisco chapter of Physician's Forum, an organization that supported national health insurance. Shortly before his death, he was expelled from the American Medical Association for refusing to pay his annual membership fee, which he did to protest the AMA's lack of support for President Truman's national health insurance plan.

His Stanford colleague Frank W. Weymouth wrote about him:

Injustice or oppression in the next street ... or any spot inhabited by men was a personal affront to Thomas Addis and his name, from its early alphabetical place, was conspicuous on lists of sponsors of scores of organizations fighting for democracy and against fascism. He worked on more committees than could reasonably have been expected of so busy a man. ... Tom Addis was happy to have a hand in bringing to the organization of society some of the logic of science and to further that understanding and to promote that democracy which are the only enduring foundations of human dignity.
