= Mammaglobin-A =

Protein-coding gene in the species Homo sapiens

SCGB2A2

Identifiers
- Aliases: SCGB2A2, MGB1, UGB2, secretoglobin family 2A member 2, PSBP1
- External IDs: OMIM: 605562; GeneCards: SCGB2A2

Gene location (Human)
Chr.	Chromosome 11 (human)
Band	11q12.3	Start	62,270,158 bp
Band	11q12.3	End	62,273,160 bp

Gene location (Mouse)
Chr.	Chromosome 19 (mouse)
Band	19 A	Start	9,847,562 bp
Band	19 A	End	9,852,808 bp
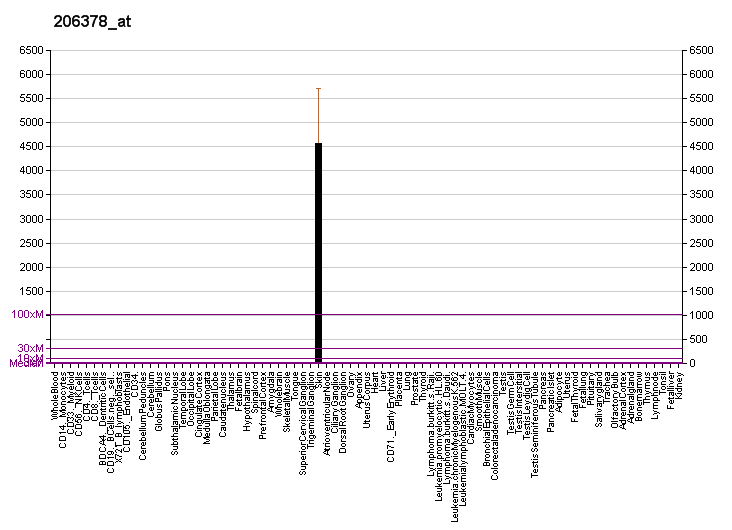
RNA expression pattern
Bgee	Human / Mouse (ortholog); Top expressed in: skin of thigh; skin of arm; skin of hip; epithelium of lactiferous gland; lactiferous duct; testicle; olfactory zone of nasal mucosa; skin of abdomen; minor salivary glands; gonad / Top expressed in: embryo; embryo; genital tubercle; More reference expression data
BioGPS	More reference expression data
Gene ontology
Molecular function	protein binding; molecular function
Cellular component	cellular component; extracellular region; extracellular space
Biological process	biological process; androgen receptor signaling pathway
Sources:Amigo / QuickGO
Orthologs
Databases	NCBI: entry; OMA: entry
Species	Human	Mouse
Entrez	4250	102639117
Ensembl	ENSG00000110484	ENSMUSG00000096872
UniProt	Q13296	J3KMP9
RefSeq (mRNA)	NM_002411	XM_006527538
RefSeq (protein)	NP_002402	NP_001365339
Location (UCSC)	Chr 11: 62.27 – 62.27 Mb	Chr 19: 9.85 – 9.85 Mb
PubMed search
- Wikidata
View/Edit Human	View/Edit Mouse

Mammaglobin-A also known as secretoglobin family 2A member 2 is a protein that in humans is encoded by the SCGB2A2 gene.

== Function ==
SCGB2A2 is a member of the superfamily of secretoglobins, a group of small dimeric secreted and sometimes glycosylated proteins. Expressed mainly in mucosa, secretoglobins seem to be involved in cell signalling, immune response, and chemotaxis, and may also serve as transporters for steroid hormones in humans.

== Clinical significance ==
SCGB2A2 expression is highly specific of mammary tissue, and is increasingly used for identification and detection of disseminated breast cancer cells.
