= Hypoallergenic =

Property of causing fewer allergic reactions

Hypoallergenic, meaning "below average" or "slightly" allergenic, is a term meaning that something (usually cosmetics, pets, textiles, food, etc.) causes fewer allergic reactions. The term was first used in 1953 in an advertising campaign for cosmetics or perhaps as early as 1940. A 2017 study of the top-selling skin moisturizers from Amazon, Target, and Walmart found 83% of those marketed as "hypoallergenic" contained at least one potentially allergenic chemical.

The term is also commonly applied to pet breeds which are claimed to produce fewer allergens than other breeds of the same species, due to some combination of their coat type, absence of fur, or absence of a gene that produces a certain protein. All breeds still produce allergens and a 2011 study failed to find a difference in allergen concentrations in homes with dogs of "hypoallergenic breeds" and other breeds.

== Certifications and definitions ==
Some cosmetics are marketed as hypoallergenic to imply that their use is less likely to lead to an allergic reaction than other products. However, the term hypoallergenic is not regulated, and no research has been done showing that products labeled hypoallergenic are less problematic than any others. In 1975, the US Food and Drug Administration tried to regulate the term hypoallergenic, but the proposal was challenged by cosmetic companies Clinique and Almay in the United States Court of Appeals for the District of Columbia. In 1977, courts overruled the U.S. Food and Drug Administration's regulation of the use of the term hypoallergenic. In 2019, the European Union released a document about claims made concerning cosmetics, but this was issued as guidance, not a regulation.

In some countries, there are allergy interest groups that provide manufacturers with a certification procedure including tests that ensure a product is unlikely to cause an allergic reaction, but such products are usually described and labeled using other but similar terms. So far, public authorities in no country provide an official certification that an item must undergo before being described as hypoallergenic.

== Hypoallergenic pets ==
Most dogs, cats, rabbits, and other fur-bearing animals can cause an allergic reaction. The proteins that cause allergies (mainly Fel d 1 in cats and Can f 1 in dogs) are found not only in the animals' fur or hair but also in saliva, urine, mucus, and hair roots and in the dander sloughed from the animals' skin. Thus, the widespread idea that "hypoallergenic pets" are those that have less hair or shed less is a myth. Furthermore, there is no evidence that certain pet breeds are less likely to trigger allergic reactions than other pet breeds. Despite that, because allergies are quite prevalent and a hypoallergenic pet would allow people with allergies to have a pet in their home, many breeds are marketed as hypoallergenic.

Dog breeds which have been claimed to be hypoallergenic include Yorkshire Terriers, Portuguese Water Dogs, Poodles and Poodle hybrids. Common rationalizations for these claims include that a breed does not shed its fur, sheds very little, or has fur with the same pH as human hair. Cat breeds such as the LaPerm, Sphynx, Peterbald, Devon Rex and Cornish Rex, which lack some or all of the normal layers in cats' fur, are claimed by some to be hypoallergenic. Siberian cats and Russian Blues are also believed by some to have such properties.

The Bashkir Curly is the only horse breed which has been claimed to be hypoallergenic, because it has a uniquely textured coat that lacks the protein (present in all other horse fur) believed to be the primary source of allergic reactions to equines.

Some species of pets, such as the pig, are popularly claimed to be hypoallergenic because they lack dense fur. However, medical studies indicate that all warm-blooded animals produce allergens through saliva and skin cells, meaning no mammalian species is fully non-allergenic.

== See also ==
- Hypoallergenic materials
