= Animal allergy =

Hypersensitivity to animal substances

In medicine, animal allergy is hypersensitivity to certain substances produced by animals, such as the proteins in animal hair and saliva. It is a common type of allergy.

== Signs and symptoms ==
Symptoms of an allergic reaction to animals may include itchy skin, nasal congestion, itchy nose, sneezing, chronic sore throat or itchy throat, swollen, red, itchy, and watery eyes, coughing, asthma, or rash on the face or chest.

== Causes ==
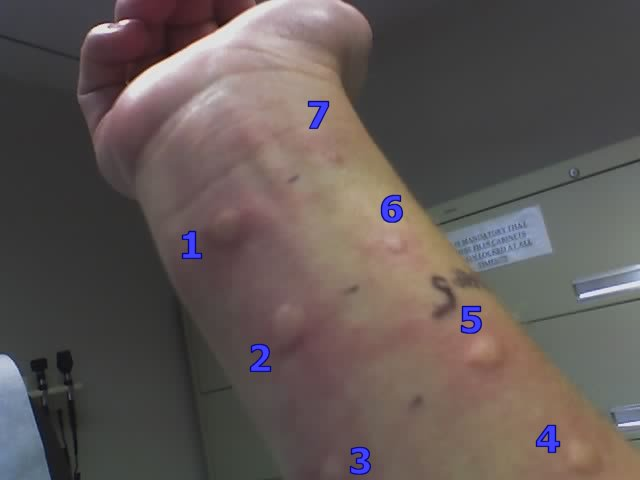
A skin allergy test showed that this person is allergic to several things, including cats.

Allergies are caused by an oversensitive immune system, leading to a misdirected immune response. The immune system normally protects the body against harmful substances such as bacteria and viruses. Allergy occurs when the immune system reacts to substances (allergens) that are generally harmless and in most people do not cause an immune response.

Allergies may react to:

- Animal hair
- Dander
- Saliva
- Urine
- cockroach calyx
- dust mite excretion

Furry animals are one of the most significant sources of year-round indoor inhalant allergens. Close contact with animals may extend beyond the home, including recreational activities such as horseback riding. Additionally, certain individuals may come into contact with animals as part of their professional duties. Developing an allergy to animals are an occupational hazard for workers in veterinary medicine, animal research facilities, and pet shops. Exposure routes include direct contact (e.g., touching an animal, cleaning a cage) and indirect contact (e.g., breathing airborne particles). Among laboratory workers, the first few years of working with animals are the highest risk for developing an allergy.

People with atopy (e.g., atopic dermatitis, hay fever, eczema, allergic asthma) have a higher than average risk of developing an animal allergy if they frequently handle animals, such as in an occupational setting.

== Treatment ==
As with any other allergy, avoidance is the first line of treatment.

== See also ==
- Cat allergy
- List of allergens
