= Allergy to cats =

Type of animal allergy caused by felines

Allergies to cats, a type of animal allergy, is one of the most common allergies experienced by humans. Among the eight known cat allergens, the most prominent allergen is secretoglobin Fel d 1, which is produced in the anal glands, salivary glands, and, mainly, in sebaceous glands of cats, and is ubiquitous in the United States, even in households without cats. Due to cats' grooming habits, the saliva is distributed to other areas of the animal, such as the hair and skin, increasing the impact of the allergen. The second most common is Fel d 2; this type is triggered by airborne dead skin flakes (dander) and their presence in the smell of cat urine.

Allergic symptoms associated with cats include coughing, wheezing, chest tightening, itching, nasal congestion, rash, watery eyes, sneezing, chapped lips, and similar symptoms. In worst-case scenarios, allergies to cats can develop into severe respiratory symptoms such as rhinitis and mild to severe forms of asthma. Despite these symptoms, there are many types of solutions to mitigate the allergic effects of cats, including medications, vaccines, and home remedies. Hypoallergenic cats are an option for individuals who want pets who produce lower levels of the allergen. Furthermore, prospective pet owners can reduce allergic reactions by selecting female cats, which are associated with lower allergen production.

== Cat allergens ==
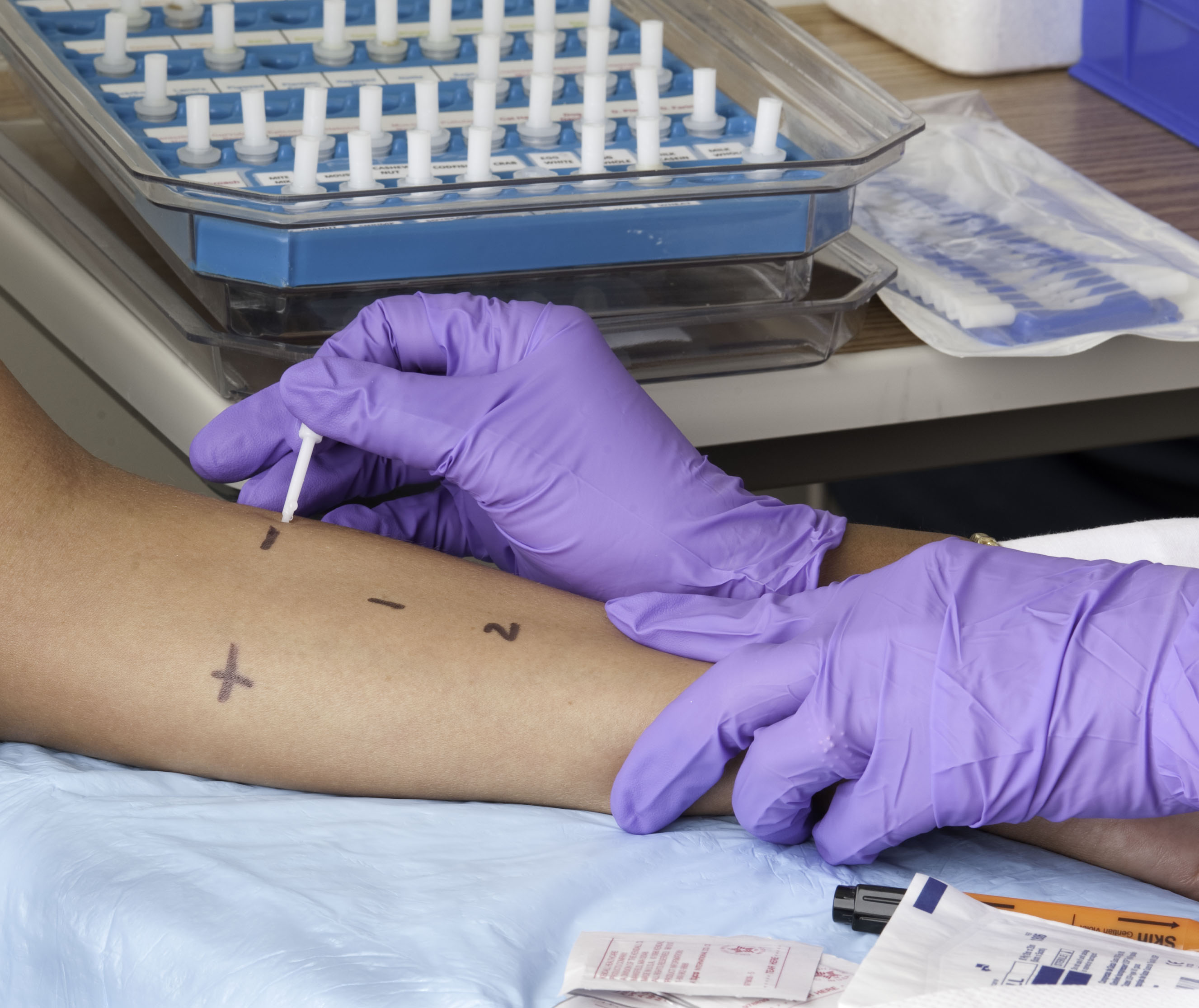
Skin prick testing for common allergens such as cat, dust mite, egg, milk, and peanut. A raised bump with redness around, also known as a wheal and flare, indicates an allergic reaction.

Eight cat allergens have been recognized by the World Health Organization/International Union of Immunological Societies (WHO/IUIS) Allergen Nomenclature Sub-Committee (ANS). Fel d 1 is the most prominent cat allergen, accounting for 96% of human cat allergies. The remaining cat allergens are Fel d 2–8, with Fel d 4, a major urinary protein found in the saliva of cats, occurring the most in humans among the other seven allergens. All cats produce Fel d 1, including hypoallergenic cats. The main method of transmission is through a cat's saliva or dander, which adheres to clothing. A 2004 study found that 63% of people allergic to cats had antibodies against Fel d 4.

According to WHO/IUIS ANS, all cat allergens are mainly exposed to humans through the airway.

List of cat protein allergens
Designation	Biochemical name	Molecular mass	IgE prevalence	UniProt ID
Fel d 1	Uteroglobin	38 kDa	>90%	P30438, P30440
Fel d 2	Serum albumin	69 kDa	14-23%	P49064
Fel d 3	Cystatin-A	11 kDa	60-90%	Q8WNR9
Fel d 4	Lipocalin	22 kDa	62.96%	Q5VFH6
Fel d 5	Immunoglobulin A	400 kDa	?	N/A
Fel d 6	Immunoglobulin M	800-1000 kDa	?	N/A
Fel d 7	Lipocalin	17.5 kDa	37.6%	E5D2Z5
Fel d 8	Latherin-like protein	24 kDa	19.3%	F6K0R4

=== Fel d 1 ===
Fel d 1 is the most dominant cat allergen - it causes allergy in 90% of people with cat allergy. It is part of the secretoglobulin family, which is a group of proteins found only in mammals and birds. Fel d 1 is primarily secreted through the sebaceous glands and can be found on the skin and fur of a cat. It is less commonly secreted through the salivary glands, lacrimal glands, and skin and anal glands. Sensitization to this allergen does not correlate significantly with cat ownership and is common among people who do not own cats. Data show that the level of sIgE against Fel d 1 is strongly linked to clinical markers of asthma severity.

=== Fel d 4 and Fel d 7 ===
Fel d 4 and Fel d 7 are cat lipocalins. Fel d 4 and Fel d 7 are two of the most common cat allergens after Fel d 1. Fel d 4 is produced in the submandibular salivary glands and is secreted in the saliva of cats, via which it is deposited on to cat dander during grooming, and is associated with atopic dermatitis in children with cat allergies. Fel d 4 is responsible for sensitizing around 63% of individuals with cat allergies. It can also cross-react with proteins such as Can f 6, Equ c 1 and Cav p 6. Fel d 7 is produced by Ebner’s glands on the tongues of cats and is secreted into saliva. It has the potential to cross-react with Can f 1.

== Signs and symptoms ==
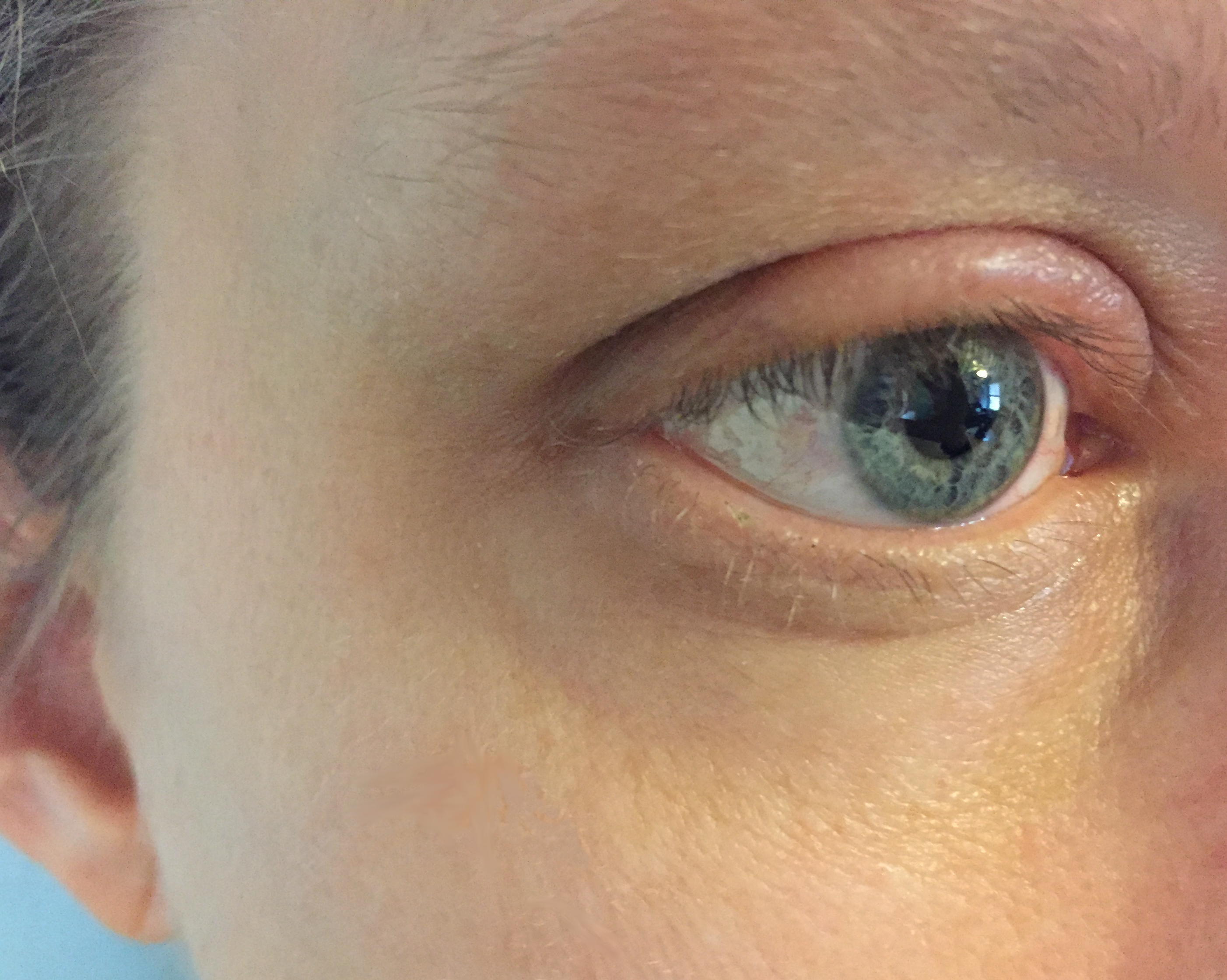
Allergic symptoms to cat dander might include: swollen, red, itchy, and watery eyes; nasal congestion, itchy nose, sneezing, fever, hives, rash, or itchy skin.

Symptoms of an allergic reaction to cats range from mild to severe, and include: swollen, red, itchy, and watery eyes (allergic conjunctivitis); nasal congestion, itchy nose, sneezing (allergic rhinitis or "hay fever"); ear pain similar to pain caused by an ear infection; sore throat or itchy throat; coughing and wheezing; hives or rash on the face or chest; and itchy skin. If a cat has scratched, licked, or bitten someone who is allergic to cats, redness and sometimes even swelling of the affected area will occur. For those severely allergic, symptoms may include airway swelling, such as in anaphylaxis, thereby requiring urgent medical attention.

Depending on the person, an allergic reaction to cats can trigger other underlying disorders, such as asthma or atopic dermatitis (eczema).

== Pathophysiology ==
As the allergen enters through the nose or mouth, antigen presenting cells of the innate immune system analyze the allergen and present antigenic peptides to helper T cells. The helper T cells acquire a type 2 phenotype (Th2) and stimulate plasma cells to produce IgE due to the presence of specific cytokines. If Th2 is expressed too much, the symptoms of cat allergies appear. Inhaled cat allergens will activate mast cells, causing coughing, increased mucous production, and airway constriction.

== Treatments ==
=== Modulation of human response ===
==== Medications ====
Cat allergies can often be controlled with over-the-counter or prescription medications. Antihistamines and decongestants may provide allergy relief.

===== Immunotherapy injections =====
Some people with allergies find relief in allergen immunotherapy, a periodic injection of the allergen under the skin. It is intended to desensitize the body's natural immune responses to the cat allergens over time. In its early stages, AIT utilized cat dander extract, which consists of microscopic dry skin flakes of cats, but later resorted to Fel d 1 due to issues of standardization. One way researchers use Fel d 1 in immunotherapy is through the alteration of its chemical structure. Disulfide bonds between Fel d 1 chains were broken to reduce the binding between the allergen and immunoglobulin E (IgE), inhibiting an allergic response.

=== Reduction of exposure ===
==== Air purifiers ====
Air purifiers can reduce levels of cat allergens in household air by removing cat dander and hair from the indoor environment.. Air purifiers that use a HEPA filter will provide better results.

==== Cat bathing ====
Regularly bathing a cat may remove significant amounts of allergens from fur. After bathing, the levels of Fel d 1 on cat skin and fur return within two days of bathing. In addition, amounts of Fel d 1 in the surrounding air return 24 hours after bathing the cat. Feeding the cat a high-quality diet with plenty of omega-3 fatty acids will help keep the coat healthy and minimize dander.

==== Specialized cat food ====
Antibodies are proteins produced by animal immune systems to bind to and hopefully neutralize foreign substances. Hens are efficient "antibody factories": once immunized against a foreign antigen, they continuously produce IgY antibodies against this antigen in the yolk of their eggs. Immunizing a hen against a cat allergen such as Fel d 1 would therefore produce a continuous stream of anti-Fel d 1 IgY in their eggs.

Cat food containing the anti-Fel d 1 IgY antibody has been found to reduce Fel d 1 levels in fur. Cat food additionally containing antibodies for Fel d 4 and Fel d 7 has been made and sold in China, but no peer-reviewed studies have been published.

The IgY strategy does not apply to Fel d 5 and Fel d 6, which are themselves cat antibodies. Chinese cat food manufacturers claim that adding papaya protease (papain) to cat food reduces the amount of these allergens in cat saliva, but they have not published any peer-reviewed study on this matter either.

=== Development of other treatments ===
Development of several human vaccines has been abandoned, including Allervax and Cat-SPIRE. More recently, in 2022 the National Institute of Health experimented with allergy shots (allergen immunotherapy, see above) and a monoclonal antibody Tezepelumab. Among the tests, the human participants given the shot with the Tezepelumab had greater results than the placebo group and the single allergy shot.

As of 2019, the Swiss company HypoPet AG is developing a vaccine it hopes could be administered to cats to reduce the emission of Fel d 1 proteins.

== Hypoallergenic cats ==
A hypoallergenic cat is a cat that is less likely to provoke an allergic reaction in humans. Although the topic is controversial, owners' experiences and clinical studies suggest that Siberian cats, Balinese cats, Devon Rex and Cornish Rex cats, Abyssinian cats, and several other breeds, especially females, are likely to have low levels of Fel d 1, the main allergenic protein.

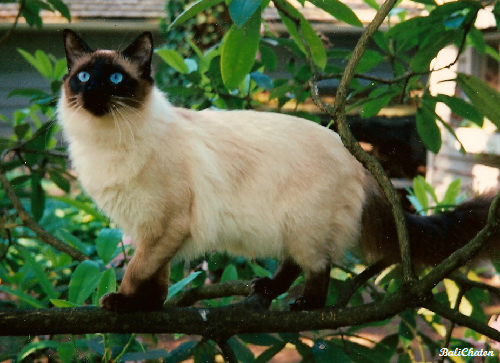
The Balinese cat is one example of a hypoallergenic cat because it produces little amounts of the allergen

From among the above cats noted, the most popular cat breeds renowned for their hypoallergenic quality are the Siberian and Balinese. These cats produce much fewer protein allergens in comparison to regular domestic household cats or other cat breeds. Cats that have some Balinese ancestry might produce lower amounts of protein allergens. Cat breeds that often have some Balinese lineage include the Oriental Shorthair, Oriental Longhair, and some Siamese cats.

The common theory among these two hypoallergenic medium- to long-haired cat breeds is that their long-haired gene is associated with producing reduced amounts of allergens. This may be the case as the Balinese cat, a medium to long-haired cat breed (also referred to as the Long-haired Siamese cat) that is regarded as hypoallergenic, whereas the Siamese cat, a short-haired breed, is not. Some Siamese cats might possess hypoallergenic qualities if they have Balinese ancestry. This might provide some evidence that the long-haired genes or traits within this cat breed have resulted in a cat that can genetically produce less of the cat allergens.

In 2006, the Allerca company announced the successful breeding of a line of hypoallergenic cats. However, no peer-reviewed studies have been done to confirm their claims, and many scientists and consumers are skeptical of the company's assertions. The company announced that on 1 January 2010, they will cease their breeding activities.

In 2006, another company, Felix Pets, also claimed to be developing a breed of hypoallergenic cat.

== Cat sex and color ==
Female cats (unspayed or spayed) produce a lower level of allergens than males, and neutered males produce a lower level of allergens than unneutered males. In 2000, researchers at the Long Island College Hospital found that cat owners with dark-colored cats were more likely to report allergy symptoms than those with light-colored cats. A later study by the Wellington Asthma Research Group found that fur color did not affect how much allergen a cat produced.

== See also ==
- Pork–cat syndrome
- List of allergies
