= Laboratory animal allergy =

Occupational disease

Laboratory animal allergy (LAA) is an occupational disease of laboratory animal technicians and scientists. It manifests as an allergic response to animal urine, specifically the major urinary proteins (Mups) of rodents, and can lead to the development of asthma. A study of 5641 workers in Japan who were exposed to laboratory animals found 23.1% had one or more allergic symptoms; globally the prevalence among at risk workers is estimated to be between 11 and 30% According to the National Institutes of Health, prevention of animal allergy depends on the control of allergens in the work environment. This involves a combination of measures to eliminate or control allergen exposure, including engineering controls, administrative controls, and personal protective equipment.

The protein product of the mouse Mup17 gene, known as Mus m 1, Ag1 or MA1, accounts for much of the allergenic properties of mouse urine. Similarly, the product of the rat Mup13 gene, Rat n 1, is also a potent human allergen. One study found that two-thirds of laboratory workers who had developed asthmatic reactions to animals had antibodies to Rat n 1.
