= Mammaglobin-B =

Protein-coding gene in the species Homo sapiens

SCGB2A1

Identifiers
- Aliases: SCGB2A1, LPHC, LPNC, MGB2, UGB3, secretoglobin family 2A member 1
- External IDs: OMIM: 604398; GeneCards: SCGB2A1

Gene location (Human)
Chr.	Chromosome 11 (human)
Band	11q12.3	Start	62,208,673 bp
Band	11q12.3	End	62,213,943 bp

Gene location (Mouse)
Chr.	Chromosome 19 (mouse)
Band	19 A	Start	9,847,562 bp
Band	19 A	End	9,852,808 bp
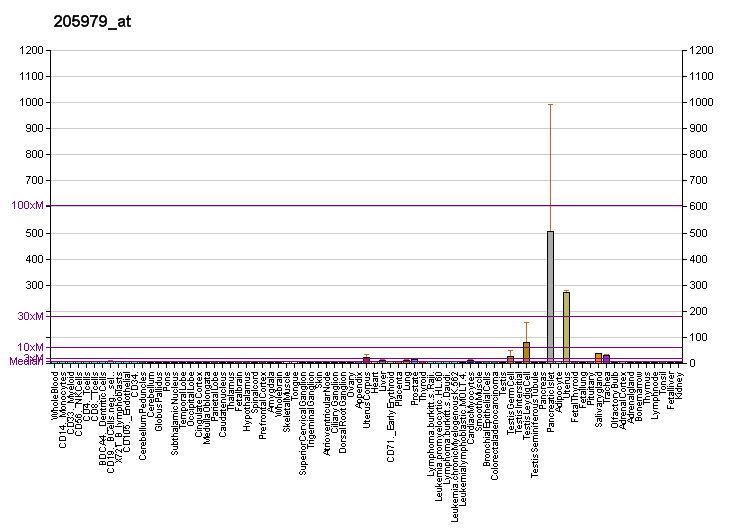
RNA expression pattern
Bgee	Human / Mouse (ortholog); Top expressed in: corpus epididymis; right uterine tube; caput epididymis; olfactory zone of nasal mucosa; beta cell; bronchial epithelial cell; endometrium; nasal epithelium; tail of epididymis; mucosa of paranasal sinus / Top expressed in: embryo; embryo; genital tubercle; More reference expression data
BioGPS	More reference expression data
Gene ontology
Molecular function	protein heterodimerization activity
Cellular component	extracellular space; extracellular region
Biological process	androgen receptor signaling pathway
Sources:Amigo / QuickGO
Orthologs
Databases	NCBI: entry; OMA: entry
Species	Human	Mouse
Entrez	4246	102639117
Ensembl	ENSG00000124939	ENSMUSG00000096872
UniProt	O75556	J3KMP9
RefSeq (mRNA)	NM_002407	XM_006527538
RefSeq (protein)	NP_002398	NP_001365339
Location (UCSC)	Chr 11: 62.21 – 62.21 Mb	Chr 19: 9.85 – 9.85 Mb
PubMed search
- Wikidata
View/Edit Human	View/Edit Mouse

Mammaglobin-B also known as secretoglobin family 2A member 1 is a protein that in humans is encoded by the SCGB2A1 gene.

== SCGB2A1 and breast cancer ==
SCGB2A1 expression is highly specific of mammary tissue, and has been used for identification and detection of disseminated breast cancer cells.
