= Can f 1 =

Allergen produced by dogs

Can f 1 or canis familiaris allergen 1 is a lipocalin allergen produced by dogs in their tongue epithelial tissue. It is homologous with the human lipocalin LCN1.
