= Fel d 1 =

Secretoglobin protein

Allergen Fel d 1, chain 1 (P30438)

Identifiers
- Symbol: Allergen_Fel_d_I_chain1
- InterPro: IPR006178
Available protein structures:
- PDB: IPR006178
- AlphaFold: IPR006178

Allergen Fel d 1, chain 2 (P30440)
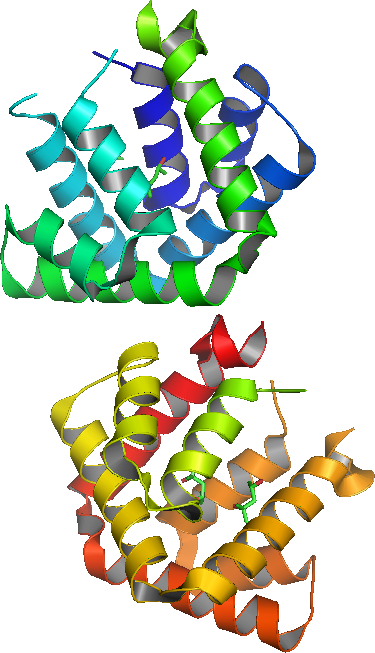
- Crystallographic structure of the Fel d 1 dimer, the primary allergen present in cat saliva

Identifiers
- Symbol: Feld-I_B
- Pfam: PF09252
- Pfam clan: CL0370
- InterPro: IPR015332
- SCOP2: 1puo / SCOPe / SUPFAM
Available protein structures:
- PDB: IPR015332 PF09252 (ECOD; PDBsum)
- AlphaFold: IPR015332; PF09252

Fel d 1 is a secretoglobin protein complex that, in cats, is encoded by the CH1 (chain 1/Fel d 1-A) and CH2 (chain 2/Fel d 1-B) genes.

Among cats, Fel d 1 is produced largely in their saliva and by the sebaceous glands located in their skin. It is the primary allergen present on cats and kittens - it causes allergy in 90% of people with cat allergy. The function of the protein for cats is unknown, but it causes an IgG or IgE reaction in sensitive humans (either as an allergic or asthmatic response).

== Variation in cats ==
Kittens produce less Fel d 1 than adult cats. Female cats produce a lower level of Fel d 1 than unneutered males, while neutered males produce levels similar to those of females. Both intact and spayed females produce similar levels. Although females and neutered males produce Fel d 1 in lower levels, they still produce enough to cause allergic symptoms in sensitive individuals.

Researchers have been investigating reports from cat owners that certain breeds of cats either do not produce Fel d 1 or are thought to do so at significantly lower levels than other breeds. For instance, individual cats from the naturally occurring Siberian breed, native to the Siberian region for which the breed is named, have been shown to have genetic variants that result in a lower production of Fel d 1. Another breed thought to have a possible genetic disposition not to produce this allergen or to produce less of it is the Balinese, an offshoot of the Siamese breed. Several other breeds are widely referenced as causing a diminished immune reaction in cat allergy sufferers, including Sphynx, Russian Blue, Cornish Rex, Devon Rex, Siamese, Javanese, Oriental Shorthair, Burmese, and LaPerm.

Fairly reliable tests for their Fel d 1 protein production is available for individual cats, but research regarding entire breeds continues, hampered by the lack of a thoroughly accessible and accurate genetic test for production of the antigen.

== Structure ==
The complete quaternary structure of Fel d 1 has been determined. The allergen is a tetrameric glycoprotein consisting of two disulfide-linked heterodimers of chains 1 and 2. Fel d 1 chains 1 and 2 share structural similarity with uteroglobin, a secretoglobin superfamily member; chain 2 is a glycoprotein with N-linked oligosaccharides. Both chains share an all alpha-helical structure.

== Presence in other species ==
Proteins matching the family signature for Fel d 1 parts, from the InterPro database, is widespread among Theria, a subclass of mammals amongst the Theriiformes (the sister taxon to Yinotheria.) Theria includes the eutherians that includes the placental mammals and the metatherians that includes the marsupials. More specifically, the InterPro profiles link the two components of Fel d 1 to the rodent androgen-binding protein (ABP; not to be confused with the human SHBG), a salivary pheromone.

A homolog of Fel d 1 protein is also present in the venom of the slow loris (Primate: Nycticebus). Slow lorises are one of only a few venomous mammals and the only known venomous primate. They possess a dual-composite venom of saliva and brachial gland exudate (BGE). The BGE possesses a protein resembling Fel d 1, which may affect host species as an allergen as a constituent of the venom. BGE is hypothesized to repel predators.

== See also ==
- Allergy to cats
- Fel d 4
- Slow loris
