= SCGB3A2 =

Protein-coding gene in the species Homo sapiens

Identifiers
- Aliases: SCGB3A2, LU103, PNSP1, UGRP1, pnSP-1, secretoglobin family 3A member 2
- External IDs: OMIM: 606531; MGI: 2153470; GeneCards: SCGB3A2

Gene location (Human)
| Chr. | Chromosome 5 (human) |
| Band | 5q32 | Start | 147,870,682 bp |
| Band | 5q32 | End | 147,882,191 bp |

Gene location (Mouse)
| Chr. | Chromosome 18 (mouse) |
| Band | 18|18 B3 | Start | 43,897,354 bp |
| Band | 18|18 B3 | End | 43,900,464 bp |
RNA expression pattern
| Bgee | Human / Mouse (ortholog); Top expressed in: trachea; right lung; lower lobe of lung; upper lobe of lung; upper lobe of left lung; oocyte; gonad; visceral pleura; testicle; secondary oocyte / Top expressed in: right lung lobe; tracheobronchial tree; trachea; left lung; left lung lobe; epithelium of bronchus; epithelium of bronchiole; external carotid artery; atrioventricular valve; main bronchus; More reference expression data |
| BioGPS | n/a |
Orthologs
| Databases | NCBI: entry; OMA: entry |
| Species | Human | Mouse |
| Entrez | 117156 | 117158 |
| Ensembl | ENSG00000164265 | ENSMUSG00000038791 |
| UniProt | Q96PL1 | Q920H1 |
| RefSeq (mRNA) | NM_054023 | NM_001289643; NM_001289644; NM_054038 |
| RefSeq (protein) | NP_473364 | NP_001276572; NP_001276573 |
| Location (UCSC) | Chr 5: 147.87 – 147.88 Mb | Chr 18: 43.9 – 43.9 Mb |
| PubMed search |
- Wikidata
| View/Edit Human | View/Edit Mouse |

Secretoglobin family 3A member 2 is a protein that in humans is encoded by the SCGB3A2 gene.
