= SCGB3A1 =

Protein-coding gene in the species Homo sapiens

Identifiers
- Aliases: SCGB3A1, HIN-1, HIN1, LU105, PnSP-2, UGRP2, secretoglobin family 3A member 1
- External IDs: OMIM: 606500; MGI: 1915912; GeneCards: SCGB3A1

Gene location (Human)
Chr.	Chromosome 5 (human)
Band	5q35.3	Start	180,590,105 bp
Band	5q35.3	End	180,591,499 bp

Gene location (Mouse)
Chr.	Chromosome 11 (mouse)
Band	11 B1.2|11 29.75 cM	Start	49,554,437 bp
Band	11 B1.2|11 29.75 cM	End	49,555,945 bp
RNA expression pattern
Bgee	Human / Mouse (ortholog); Top expressed in: trachea; bronchial epithelial cell; parotid gland; olfactory zone of nasal mucosa; pancreatic ductal cell; right lung; urethra; palpebral conjunctiva; lower lobe of lung; upper lobe of lung / Top expressed in: trachea; right lung; right lung lobe; epithelium of trachea; embryo; left lung; main bronchus; embryo; Epithelium of main bronchus; submucosa of trachea; More reference expression data
BioGPS	n/a
Gene ontology
Molecular function	cytokine activity
Cellular component	extracellular region; extracellular exosome; extracellular space
Biological process	negative regulation of cell growth; regulation of cell population proliferation; positive regulation of myoblast fusion; regulation of signaling receptor activity; signal transduction
Sources:Amigo / QuickGO
Orthologs
Databases	NCBI: entry; OMA: entry
Species	Human	Mouse
Entrez	92304	68662
Ensembl	ENSG00000161055	ENSMUSG00000064057
UniProt	Q96QR1	Q920D7
RefSeq (mRNA)	NM_052863	NM_054037; NM_170727
RefSeq (protein)	NP_443095	NP_473378; NP_733923
Location (UCSC)	Chr 5: 180.59 – 180.59 Mb	Chr 11: 49.55 – 49.56 Mb
PubMed search
- Wikidata
View/Edit Human	View/Edit Mouse

Secretoglobin family 3A member 1 is a protein that in humans is encoded by the SCGB3A1 gene.
