= Uteroglobin =

Protein-coding gene in the species Homo sapiens

SCGB1A1

Identifiers
- Aliases: SCGB1A1, CC10, CC16, CCPBP, CCSP, UGB, UP-1, UP1, secretoglobin family 1A member 1
- External IDs: OMIM: 192020; MGI: 98919; GeneCards: SCGB1A1

Gene location (Human)
Chr.	Chromosome 11 (human)
Band	11q12.3	Start	62,405,103 bp
Band	11q12.3	End	62,423,195 bp

Gene location (Mouse)
Chr.	Chromosome 19 (mouse)
Band	19|19 A	Start	9,061,000 bp
Band	19|19 A	End	9,065,322 bp
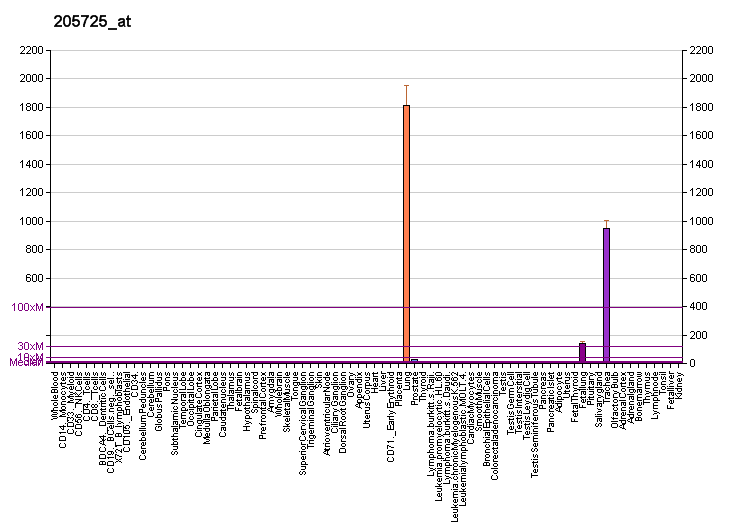
RNA expression pattern
Bgee	Human / Mouse (ortholog); Top expressed in: bronchial epithelial cell; right lung; mucosa of paranasal sinus; olfactory zone of nasal mucosa; urethra; nasal epithelium; lower lobe of lung; testicle; trachea; upper lobe of lung / Top expressed in: right lung lobe; superior surface of tongue; left lung; left lung lobe; decidua; trachea; esophagus; bronchiole; embryo; blastocyst; More reference expression data
BioGPS	More reference expression data
Gene ontology
Molecular function	polychlorinated biphenyl binding; phospholipase A2 inhibitor activity; protein binding
Cellular component	cytoplasm; rough endoplasmic reticulum; nuclear envelope; intracellular anatomical structure; secretory granule; extracellular region; endoplasmic reticulum; extracellular exosome; extracellular space
Biological process	response to cytokine; negative regulation of interferon-gamma production; negative regulation of interleukin-5 production; negative regulation of catalytic activity; response to drug; negative regulation of interleukin-4 production; regulation of mRNA stability; female pregnancy; response to fibroblast growth factor; response to glucocorticoid; negative regulation of transcription by RNA polymerase II; response to ozone; response to organic substance; negative regulation of interleukin-13 production; response to lipopolysaccharide; negative regulation of T cell proliferation; regulation of inflammatory response; response to silicon dioxide; embryo implantation; signal transduction
Sources:Amigo / QuickGO
Orthologs
Databases	NCBI: entry; OMA: entry
Species	Human	Mouse
Entrez	7356	22287
Ensembl	ENSG00000149021	ENSMUSG00000024653
UniProt	P11684	Q06318
RefSeq (mRNA)	NM_003357	NM_011681
RefSeq (protein)	NP_003348	NP_035811
Location (UCSC)	Chr 11: 62.41 – 62.42 Mb	Chr 19: 9.06 – 9.07 Mb
PubMed search
- Wikidata
View/Edit Human	View/Edit Mouse

Uteroglobin, or blastokinin, also known as secretoglobin family 1A member 1 (SCGB1A1), is a protein that in humans is encoded by the SCGB1A1 gene.

SCGB1A1 is the founding member of the secretoglobin family of small, secreted, disulfide-bridged dimeric proteins found only in mammals. This antiparallel disulfide linked homodimeric protein is multifunctional and found in various tissues in various names such as: uteroglobin (UG, UGB), uteroglobin-like antigen (UGL), blastokinin, club-cell secretory protein (CCSP), Clara-cell 16 kD protein (17 in rat/mice), club-cell-specific 10 kD protein (CC10), human protein 1, urine protein 1 (UP-1), polychlorinated biphenyl-binding protein (PCB-BP), human club cell phospholipid-binding protein (hCCPBP), secretoglobin 1A member 1 (SCGB1A1).

This protein is specifically expressed in club cells in the lungs.

== Function ==
The precise physiological role of uteroglobin is not yet known. Putative functions are:

1. Immunomodulation
2. Progesterone binding: weak in some animals, especially weak in humans. (Note: UGB is itself progesterone induced gene in the endometrium in Lagomorphs)
3. Inhibits phospholipase A2 in vitro
4. Binds phosphatidylcholine, phosphatidylinositol
5. Binds to fibronectin: The uteroglobulin knockout mice on the inbred C57Bl6 strain develop Goodpasture's syndrome like glomerulopathy due to fibronectin binding of IgA which might potentially be prevented by uteroglobin replacement. However contrary to the animal model claims, human genetic data might suggest that the effect may be indirect
6. Uteroglobin knockout mice on the inbred 129 strain appear to have healthy phenotype (no glomerulopathy development), but show physiological differences in their responses to respiratory challenges. The phenotype exhibited by these mice are; decreased bioaccumulation of biphenyls, susceptibility and increased IL-13, and IL-6 following hyperoxic challenge, and changes in the club cell morphology.
7. Target of polychlorinated biphenyl (pcb) binding
