= Dander =

Material shed from the body of humans and various animals

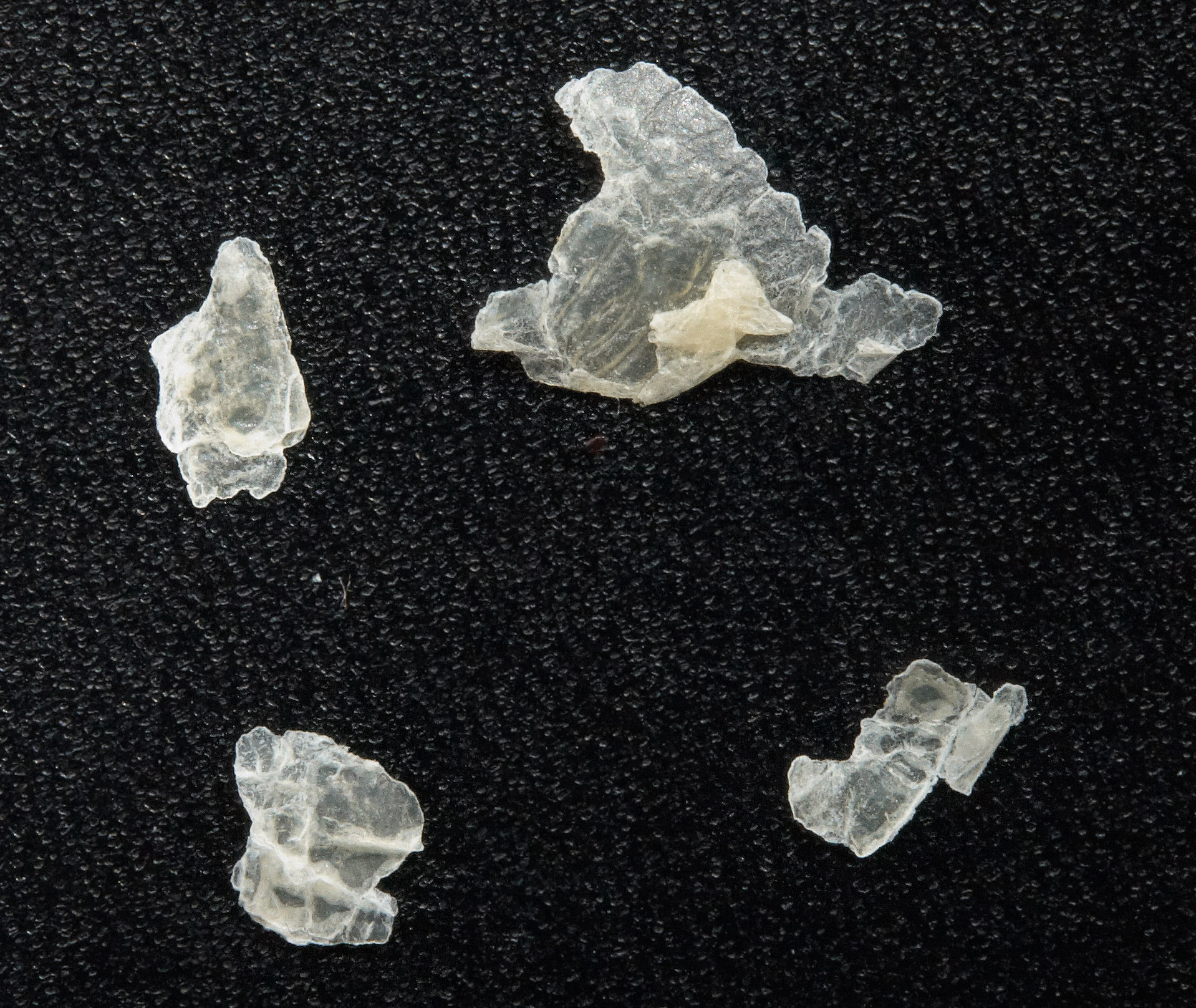
Flakes of dead skin cells

Dander is material shed from the body of humans and other animals that have fur, hair, or feathers. The term is similar to dandruff, when an excess of flakes becomes visible. Skin flakes that come off the main body of an animal are dander, while the flakes of skin called dandruff come from the scalp and are composed of epithelial skin cells. The surface layer of mammalian skin is called the stratum corneum, which is shed as part of normal skin replacement.

Dander is microscopic, and can be transported through the air in house dust, where it forms the diet of the dust mites. Through the air, dander can enter the mucous membranes in the nose and lungs, causing allergies in susceptible individuals, largely through the mechanism of allergy to proteins in the bodies of the dust mites that live on dander. Dander builds up in carpets, curtains, clothing, mattresses, bedding, and pillows. Environments with fewer textiles and upholstery will generally have less dander accumulation.

More pet dander is sloughed off in older animals than in younger animals. Dander build up can be a cause of allergies, such as allergic rhinitis, in humans. Dr. Paivi Salo, an allergy expert at the National Institutes of Health, states that "airborne allergies affect approximately 10–30% of adults and 40% of children." Damp dusting and vacuum cleaners with sealed bodies and fitted with HEPA filters reduce re-distribution of the dander dust, with associated dust mites, into the air.

An old etymology describes dander as a dialect synonym of dandruff, possibly from Yorkshire in England.

== See also ==
- Allergy to cats
- Allergy to dogs
- Dandruff
- Powder down
