= Oriental bicolour =

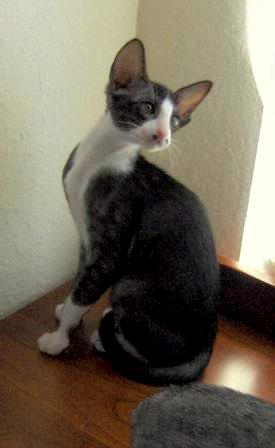
- Origin: United States

Breed standards
- GCCF: standard

An Oriental bicolour is any cat of Oriental type, either long-haired or short-haired and in any pattern including colourpoint, which has white areas on its coat caused by the white spotting gene. In most cat fancier and breeder organisations, Oriental bicolours do not constitute a standardised breed, but a coat pattern variant of the breed of their foundation stock. One breed registry is an exception, the UK-based Governing Council of the Cat Fancy (GCCF), which has defined them as a separate breed named Oriental Bicolour (capitalised).

== History ==
Although some experimental breeding took place during the 1970s and 1980s in the UK, including Pat Turner's Seychellois breeding program, modern-day Oriental bicolours owes their origins to matings initiated in the United States by Lindajean Grillo of Ciara Cattery. Starting in 1979, Grillo carried out a series of matings between Siamese and bicoloured American Shorthair. She then selected the best bicoloured offspring to mate back to Siamese or Orientals in order to regain type. The variety was granted recognition by TICA in 1983 and the first champion was Ciara Quite-N-Oreo.

During the 1980s, European breeders, principally those in France and the Netherlands, initiated their own Oriental bicolour breeding lines. A red and white female Moroccan street cat was used as an initial outcross, then later on a Black & White Cornish Rex. Further cats were imported from the USA. It was important for breeders to have different lines in order to be able to mate bicolour to bicolour and obtain a higher proportion of white on the coat, without excessive inbreeding.

FIFe granted championship recognition in 2003 to the bicoloured Oriental Shorthairs and in 2005 to the colourpoint and white cats under the breed name Seychellois.

Although there was a small breeding program stemming from the last of Pat Turner's cats being kept by Barbara Lambert (Nomis cattery, breeding under FIFe guidelines), this disappeared following her death in the early 2000s. The first modern-day Oriental bicolours were imported to the UK starting in 2004 with the arrival of Black & White male Tassam Tom of Landican owned by Sarah Johnson and Pat Norman of the Landican Cattery. The variety gained official Preliminary recognition with the GCCF in 2006. In 2008 the breed progressed to Provisional Status, the fastest breed recognition within this organisation and a mark of the breed's popularity and success.

== Registration policies ==
There are differences in the way that Oriental bicolours are registered in different organisations. Some will register bicoloured Oriental Shorthairs and bicoloured Siamese/Seychellois separately, maintaining a genetic segregation between long and short coats and between colourpoint and solid patterns. This effectively fragments different groups of Oriental bicolour. The GCCF registration policy treats bicolours as a breed, named Oriental Bicolour, and permits all of these related groups to be bred together so that cats carrying the genes for colourpointed long hair are not considered variants. Permitted outcrosses are Siamese, Balinese, Oriental Shorthair, and Oriental Longhair. All offspring are registered as Oriental Bicolours and cannot be registered under the breed of their outcross parent. Offspring who do not inherit white spotting can now be registered as Orientals in the GCCF, according to their phenotype, and can be shown.

== Appearance ==
Oriental bicolours are cats of modern Oriental type with a long, slender body and tapering whip-like tail. The triangular shape of the head is made of straight lines with a straight side profile and large, wide-set ears. The eyes are green, except in the colourpoint varieties which have blue eyes. The coat on the short-haired variety is sleek, close-lying and glossy, while that of the long-haired is fine and silky, lying flat to the body with no thick undercoat and forming a plume on the tail. The full range of colours seen in Siamese and Orientals is permitted, however a defining feature of breed is that they always have white spotting. In a cat of show quality this should extend to cover at least one third of the body and the distribution may be random and quirky like splashed paint. There is always a greater distribution of white on the cat's underside and legs in comparison with its back. This patterning is caused by the dominant white spotting gene, which is symbolized with the letter S.
