= Sylvia Holland =

British artist

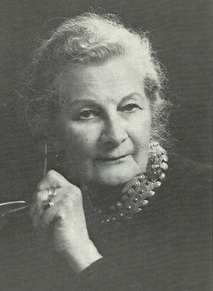
- Born: Sylvia Grace Moberly; 20 July 1900; Ampfield, Hampshire, England
- Died: 14 April 1974 (aged 73); Tarzana, Los Angeles, California
- Other name: Sylvia Moberly-Holland
- Education: Architectural Association School of Architecture
- Occupations: storyboard artist, illustrator, concept artist, architect
- Years active: 1925–1974
- Spouse: Frank Cuyler Holland (m. 1926; died 1928)
- Children: 2

Sylvia Holland (born Sylvia Moberly, 20 July 1900 – 14 April 1974) was a British-born concept artist, illustrator, and the second woman to become a storyboard artist for Walt Disney Productions. She worked for Disney in the 1930s and 1940s and is especially known for her work on the 1940 film Fantasia.

== Biography ==
Born in the village of Ampfield, England on 20 July 1900, Holland was born Sylvia Moberly was one of four children. Her father was an ordained clergyman and musician who organized an all-women string orchestra. As a child, she developed a hobby of photography after receiving a Kodak point-and-shoot camera, as well loved to draw and conduct music. As a teenager, she was enrolled at the Gloucestershire School of Domestic Science before moving to London to study at the Architectural Association School in 1919. Holland graduated in 1925, and became the first woman to join the Royal Institute of British Architects. The following year, she married Frank Holland, a fellow architecture student from Canada. The couple moved to Victoria, British Columbia and had their first child, Theodora.

In Canada, Sylvia joined the Architectural Institute of British Columbia. In 1928, Sylvia, who was pregnant with their son Boris, traveled to England to see her parents leaving her husband behind at home. While she was away, Frank had developed a cold, and after some Christmas shopping in severely cold Canadian weather, he was diagnosed with an ear infection. Frank later died from mastoiditis on 28 December, a month before the birth of their son. Not long after, the Great Depression had occurred in which demand for architectural projects had plummeted. During the early 1930s, Sylvia moved her single-parent household to a farm in Metchosin. Sometime later, her son developed the same ailment as Frank, in which Sylvia was advised by a doctor to seek a drier climate. In 1936, she re-located her family to Los Angeles, but because she did not have an American degree, she could not practice as an architect. A year later, Sylvia was hired as a sketch artist by Universal Studios on several movies such as One Hundred Men and a Girl (1937) and Mad About Music (1938).

After seeing Snow White and the Seven Dwarfs (1937), Holland decided she wanted to work for Walt Disney Productions. To gain more experience in animation, she briefly worked as a cel inker for Walter Lantz Productions. By the summer of 1938, she had heard that Disney's next film after Pinocchio (1940) would be a concert film. Excited at the news, Holland applied to work for Disney and was granted an interview with Walt Disney. On 6 September, she was hired, and became the second woman hired into their story department, following Bianca Majolie.

Because of her background as a musician and artist, her first assignment was the Pastoral Symphony segment for Fantasia (1940). By December 1938, Holland had been asked to supervise the "Waltz of the Flowers" segment of the Nutcracker Suite. After being partnered with Majolie and fellow sketch artist Ethel Kulsar, her responsibilities at Disney included story direction, concept art, colour studies, timing, and supervising other artists. Throughout her career at the Disney studios, Walt Disney held her in high regard, noting that she was "a highly talented artist with a marvelous sense for decoration and color" who "contributed immensely to the good taste and beauty of our pictures".

By April 1940, Fantasia had been finished, and Holland later developed concept art on the "Little April Shower" sequence for the 1942 film Bambi. With Mary Blair, she developed concept art for Baby Ballet, a sequence intended for a planned sequel to Fantasia that never got made. Around this same time, Holland was developing storyboards on an early version of The Little Mermaid. However, by September 1941, Holland had been laid off, but she returned to Disney in August 1942 to develop storyboards on Victory Through Air Power (1943). By early 1945, the Disney studios had looked to salvage abandoned musical segments and combine them for the 1946 package film Make Mine Music. During production, Holland had written story treatments about Greek muses, which later became the "Two Silhouettes" sequence.

Holland was laid off from Disney once again in 1946, and briefly worked for Metro-Goldwyn-Mayer. She then became a children's illustrator for Whitman Publishing as well worked as a greetings card designer for MacMillan's Readers and Chryston Limited Edition. During the 1950s, she purchased three and a half acres within the San Fernando Valley in which she constructed two houses and an office on Ventura Boulevard. During the 1960s and 1970s, she also developed a past time of developing of a new breed of Siamese cats, the Balinese, which brought her international attention.

On Easter Sunday 1974, Holland died from a stroke in Tarzana, California.

== Bibliography ==
- Canemaker, John (1996). "Sylvia Moberly-Holland". Before the Animation Begins: The Art and Lives of Disney Inspirational Sketch Artists. Hyperion Books. pp. 107–113. ISBN 978-0786861521.
- Ghez, Didier (2016). "Sylvia Holland". They Drew as They Pleased: The Hidden Art of Disney's Musical Years: the 1940s (Part One). Chronicle Books. pp. 77–130. ISBN 978-1452137445.
- Holt, Nathalia (2019). The Queens of Animation: The Untold Story of the Women Who Transformed the World of Disney and Made Cinematic History. Little, Brown and Company. ISBN 978-0316439152.
