= Balinese cat =

Breed of cat

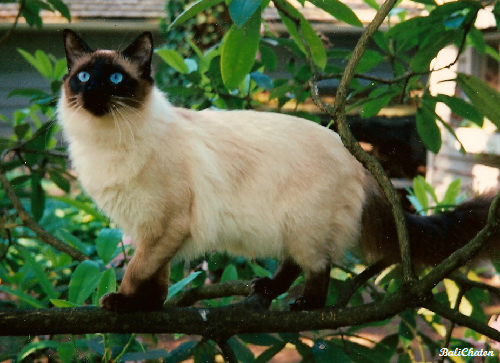
- Old-style seal point Balinese
- Other names: Long-haired Siamese, Thai Siamese
- Origin: Thailand; United States

Breed standards
- CFA: standard
- FIFe: standard
- TICA: standard
- ACF: standard
- ACFA/CAA: standard
- CCA-AFC: standard
- GCCF: standard

The Balinese is a long-haired breed of domestic cat with Siamese-style point coloration and sapphire-blue eyes. The Balinese is also known as the purebred long-haired Siamese since it originated as a natural mutation of that breed and hence is essentially the same cat but with a medium-length silky coat and a distinctively plumed tail.

As is the case with their short-haired counterparts, a genetic distinction is made between traditional or "old-style" and modern body types. In the American standard, color variants derived from the Colorpoint Shorthair are further considered a separate breed, known as the Javanese. There is no particular connection between these cats and the Indonesian islands of Bali and Java, from which they derive their names.

Like their Siamese ancestors, Balinese are sociable, vocal, playful, inquisitive, and intelligent.

== History and development ==
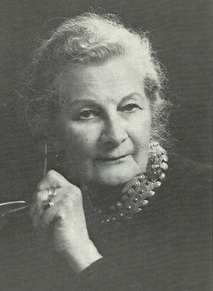
Sylvia Holland, pioneer Balinese breeder

The "Balinese" is not actually from Bali or any part of Indonesia. Its history begins with the first Siamese cats that were imported from Thailand to the U.S. and U.K. in the mid-1800s, some of whom carried the recessive long-haired gene. The Balinese breed subsequently originated from deliberate breeding efforts based on this naturally expressed genetic trait.

Initially, occasional long-haired kittens in Siamese litters were considered a fault in the bloodline and sold exclusively as pets. There are records of these cats as early as the 1900s; "Long-haired Siamese" were first registered as show cats with the American Cat Fanciers' Federation in 1928. In the mid-1950s, breeders in the US began serious efforts to develop the long-haired variant as a separate breed. Considering Long-haired Siamese too cumbersome a name, initial breeder Helen Smith dubbed the new breed "Balinese" as a reference to the grace of Balinese dancers.

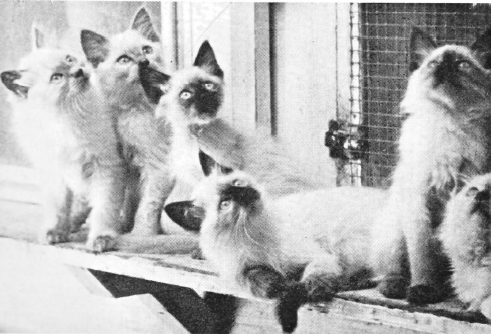
Sylvia Holland's Balinese kittens, circa 1971

A breeder named Sylvia Holland (who was also an illustrator for Walt Disney Studios) worked to further establish the breed standard in the 1960s and 1970s. She recognized only cats showing the classic Siamese points in seal, chocolate, blue, and lilac as true Balinese, refusing to accept others because they had likely originated from crosses with other breeds. The American Cat Fanciers' Association had meanwhile officially classified Siamese with the newer red and cream as well as lynx (tabby) and tortoiseshell (or "tortie") patterned points as a separate breed, the Colorpoint Shorthair, and the long-haired cats derived from these colors and patterns were subsequently likewise classified separately as "Javanese", in keeping with the Indonesian island theme.

Like their Siamese ancestors, the Balinese gradually split into two separate varieties based on physical type. The traditional Siamese (also called old-style or "apple-head", now being separately developed as the Thai), was the type in vogue when the Balinese was established, and hence used in its development; these old-style Balinese still closely resemble those from the early breeding programs.

As the parent short-haired Siamese gained in popularity, however, a trend developed in favor of a more extremely elongated, slender type with a distinctively wedge-shaped head. The modern (or "contemporary") Balinese was subsequently derived directly from this newer Siamese ideal. By the mid-1980s, the old-style Balinese, like their Siamese counterparts, had disappeared from most cat shows, except a few breeders who maintained the original Balinese type. The two varieties of Balinese thus have very few if any recent ancestors in common.

=== Balinese-Javanese ===
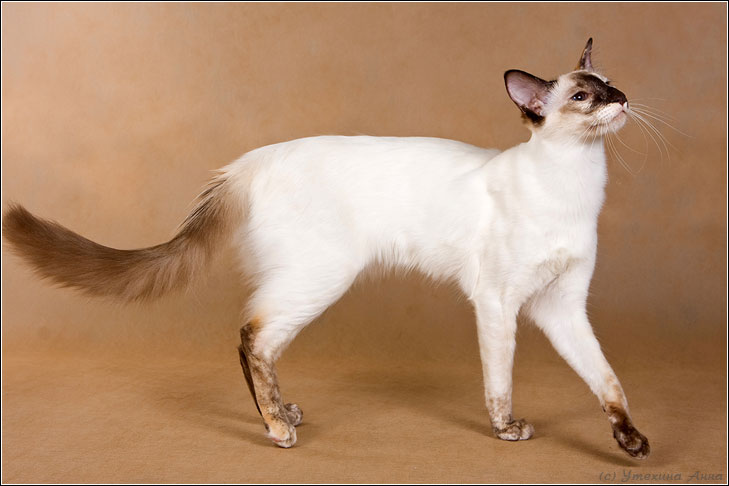
Modern chocolate tortoiseshell-point Javanese

There was discussion in the Cat Fanciers' Association about merging the two breeds into one breed with two color divisions as early as 2006. The Javanese is a cross between the Siamese, Colorpoint Shorthair, and Balinese. In 2008, breeders in the Balinese Breed Council and Javanese Breed Council voted to combine the Balinese and Javanese as one breed and declared Javanese as a color division of the Balinese. The Cat Fanciers' Association was the only organization to believe that Javanese was a separate breed. This does not affect the colors or description of Balinese, since they are two separate divisions but they are just placed under the Balinese. Javanese will still have the same colors as before, along with Balinese having the same colors mentioned below.

This movement has brought The Cat Fanciers' Association more in line with the other worldwide registries. The Cat Fanciers' Association made this change since the two councils in their organization (Balinese and Javanese) were overlapping around an average of 50 to 75% with the same members who breed and exhibited the two types. It is hoped that combining the two breeds will increase Balinese registration in the Cat Fanciers' Association, by encouraging new breeders and exhibitors of Balinese to come forth and present their cat. They also wished to show more Javanese of the appropriate coat length in the shows. This will also help decrease the number of cats needed to maintain a healthy breeding program.

== Description ==
=== Appearance ===
The two types of Balinese are still analogous to their Siamese counterparts. While both are relatively slender, graceful fine-boned cats with long legs and tails, neat oval paws, almond-shaped eyes, and large pointed ears, the traditional type is overall the more substantial, with a broader head and sturdier body. The modern type features a noticeably more wedge-shaped head with long tapering muzzle and longer, broader ears, atop a more slender and elongated body.

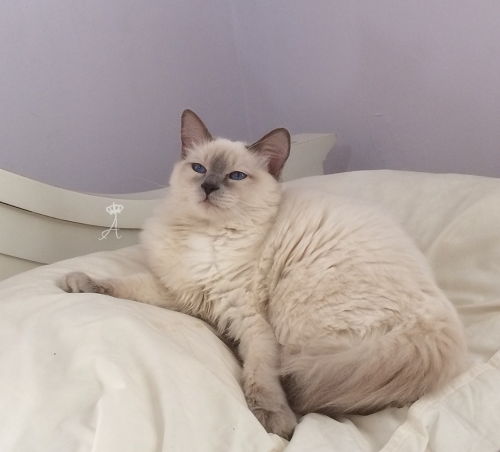
Old-style lilac point

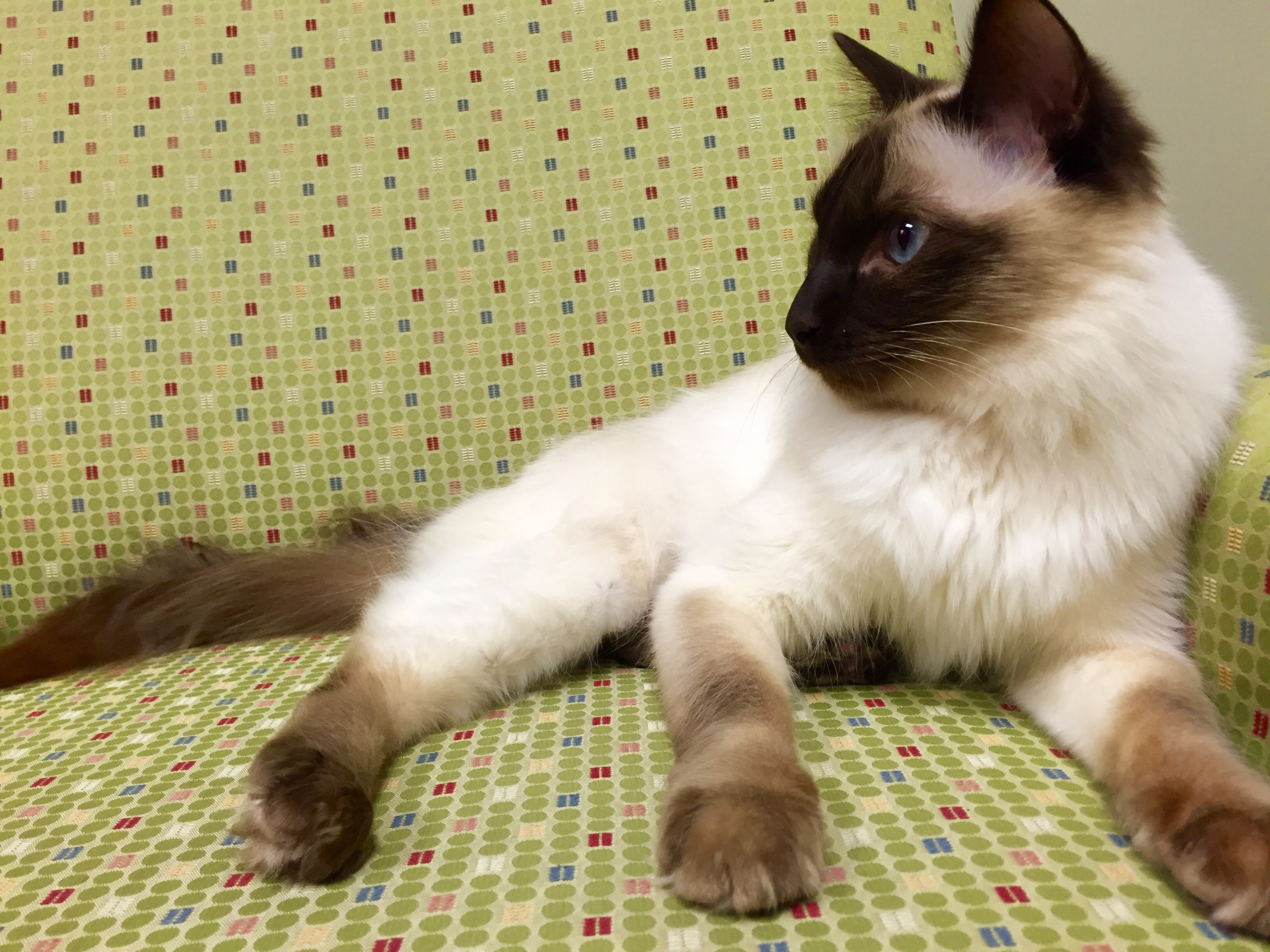
Traditional chocolate point Balinese

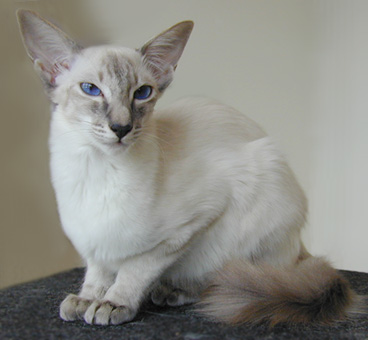
Modern blue lynx point Javanese

=== Coat and color ===
The coat is medium-length (although there can be considerable variance by individual) and should be soft and silky, without the fluffy undercoat typical of most long-haired breeds. The offspring of two Balinese will have a longer coat than that of a Balinese and a Siamese. In all cases, the tail should have a definite plume, or fringe, of longer hair. Eye color ranges from pale blue through sapphire/violet; the intensity of color can change slightly with age and diet. The paw pad color can be used to identify the color point in kittens. Pink pads are found in chocolate and lilac points; while dark pads are found in blue and seal points.

Like all cats with the point pattern, Balinese kittens are born pure cream or white and gradually develop visible points in colder parts of their body – the face, ears, paws and tail. Their color is identifiable by the time they are four weeks old. Some cats tend to darken with age, and generally, adult Balinese cats living in warm climates have lighter coats than those in cool climates.

The Cat Fanciers' Federation and most other associations worldwide accept the Balinese breed in seal, blue, chocolate, lilac, red, and cream point, besides tortoiseshell and lynx points in all of these colors. The Cat Fanciers' Association standard continues to accept the Balinese in only the classic seal, blue, chocolate, and lilac points, with all other possible colors and patterns classed separately as Javanese.

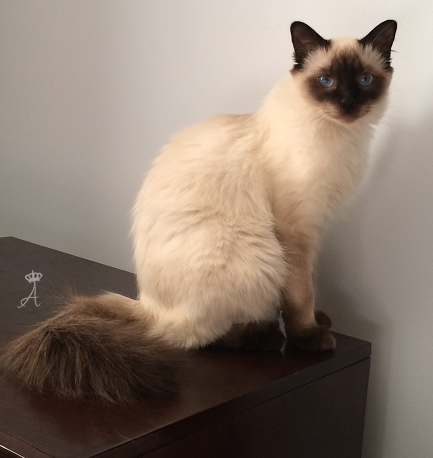
Old-style seal point

=== Temperament ===
Balinese share the traits of the short-haired Siamese, and hence are notably social and playful cats with an intense interest in the activity around them and a tendency to vocalize often and persistently, albeit at a lower volume. Akin to their short-haired counterparts (i.e the Siamese cats), they are quite clingy and can be high-maintenance in terms of attention, they are often described as dog-like. They also tend to have high energy levels and are quite active and playful like their short-haired Siamese counterparts. They are reputed to have the highest intelligence of all the long-haired breeds. They are also reputed to be notably acrobatic and to enjoy intimate contact with their owners.

== Genetics ==
The pointed pattern is a form of partial albinism, resulting from a mutation in tyrosinase, an enzyme involved in melanin production. The mutated enzyme is heat-sensitive; it fails to work at normal body temperatures but becomes active in cooler areas of the skin. This results in dark coloration in the coolest parts of the cat's body, including the extremities and the face, which is cooled by the passage of air through the sinuses. Though crossbreeding with other breeds took place to produce the less traditional Javanese colors, they are considered purebred cats if they are registered and have at least 3-4 or more generations of Siamese or Balinese lineage.

== Health ==
They are a pedigree breed, which means they are developed from such a small gene pool of Siamese with the long hair mutation. The smaller the gene pool, the more chances they have to inherit many unknown health disorders. A possible confirmed disease for Balinese is Progressive Retinal Atrophy (PRA), which is a degeneration of the retina in the eye; that may lead to weak or impaired vision.
