= Mekong Bobtail =

Breed of domestic cat

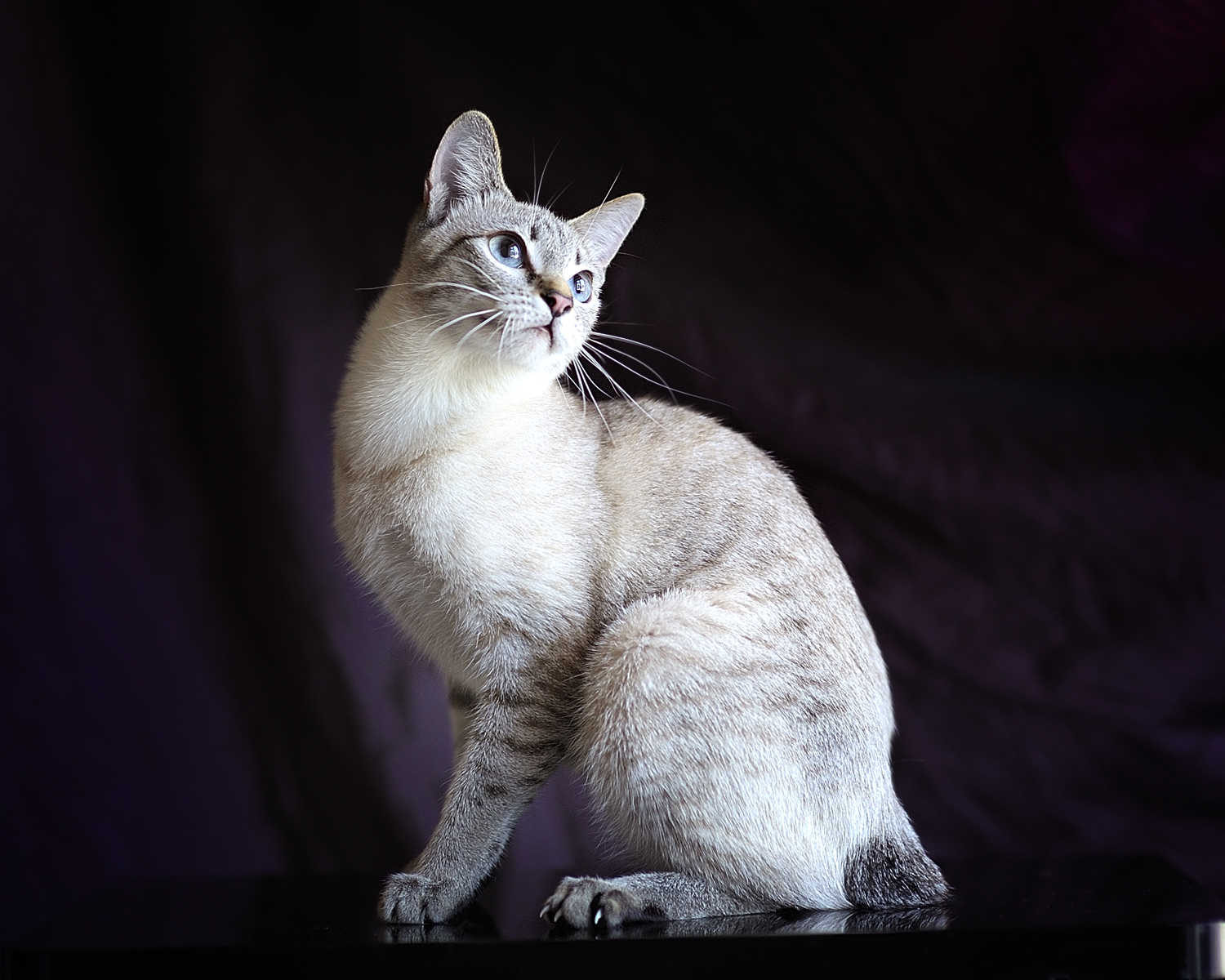
- Lynx-point Mekong Bobtail
- Other names: Thai Bobtail
- Origin: Thailand; Russia

Breed standards
- WCF: standard

The Mekong Bobtail (formerly known as the Thai Bobtail) is a breed of cat. Originally named for Thailand, the country of origin of its progenitors, the breed is now named after the Mekong River. It is naturally distributed throughout parts of Asia and was developed as a breed in Russia, and it was recognised by the World Cat Federation in 2004.

== History ==
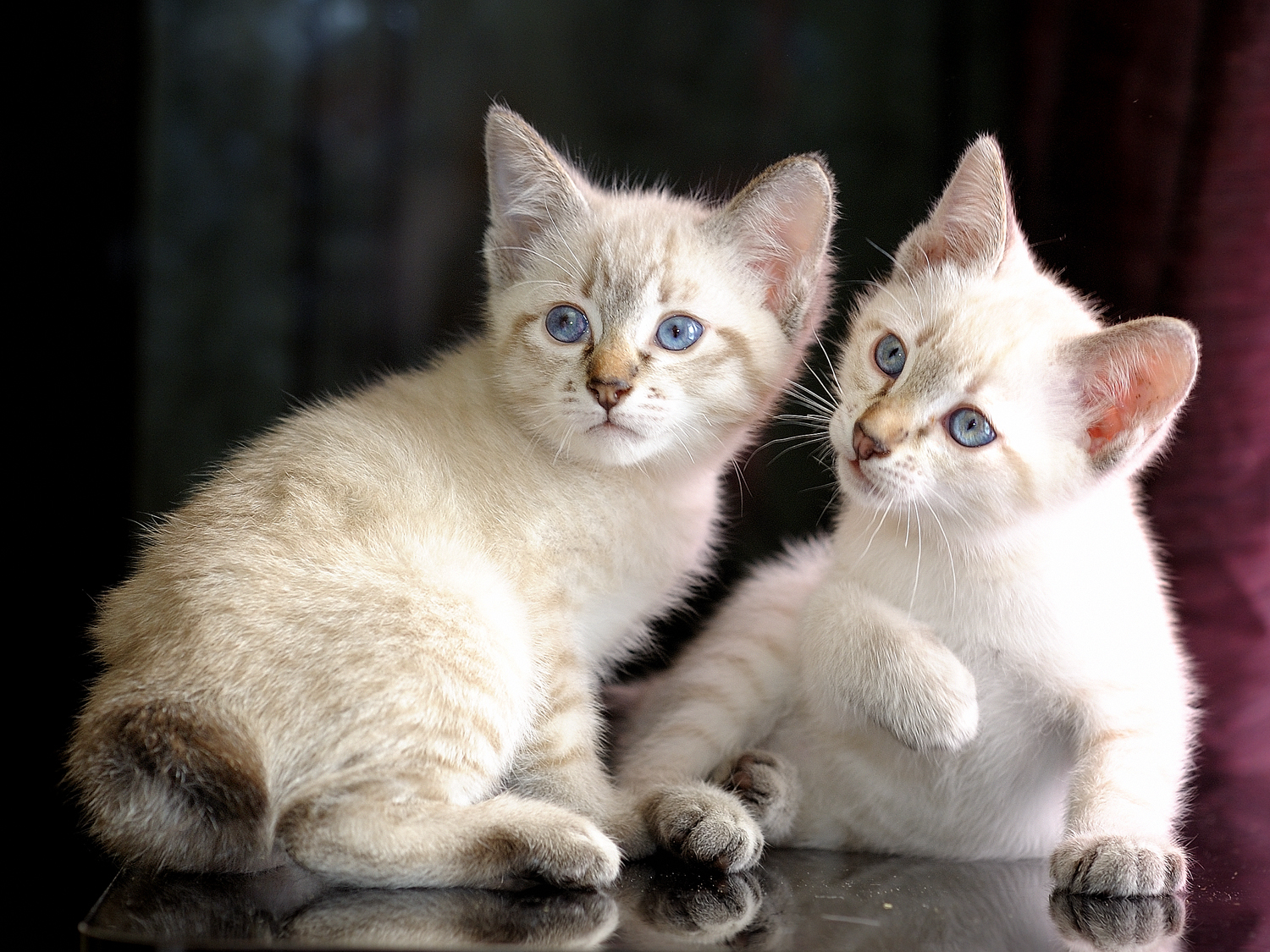
Mekong Bobtail kittens

In the 19th century, Mekong Bobtails were among the royal cats given to Russian emperor Nicholas II by Chulalongkorn, king of Siam. The majority of the 200 royal cats gifted by Chulalongkorn had kinked tails resembling those of the modern-day Mekong Bobtail. Other bobtail cats from Southeast Asia were also imported into Russia. The breed is considered to have been developed in Russia, and continued to be experimentally developed there, being bred with other bobtail cats, and possibly also with Siamese cats. The breed started to become more widely known in the 1980s, and in December 1994 a breed standard was drawn up by O. S. Mironova, a Russian felinologist. The breed was recognised by the World Cat Federation in August 2004, and at that time its name was changed from "Thai Bobtail" to "Mekong Bobtail".

== Characteristics ==
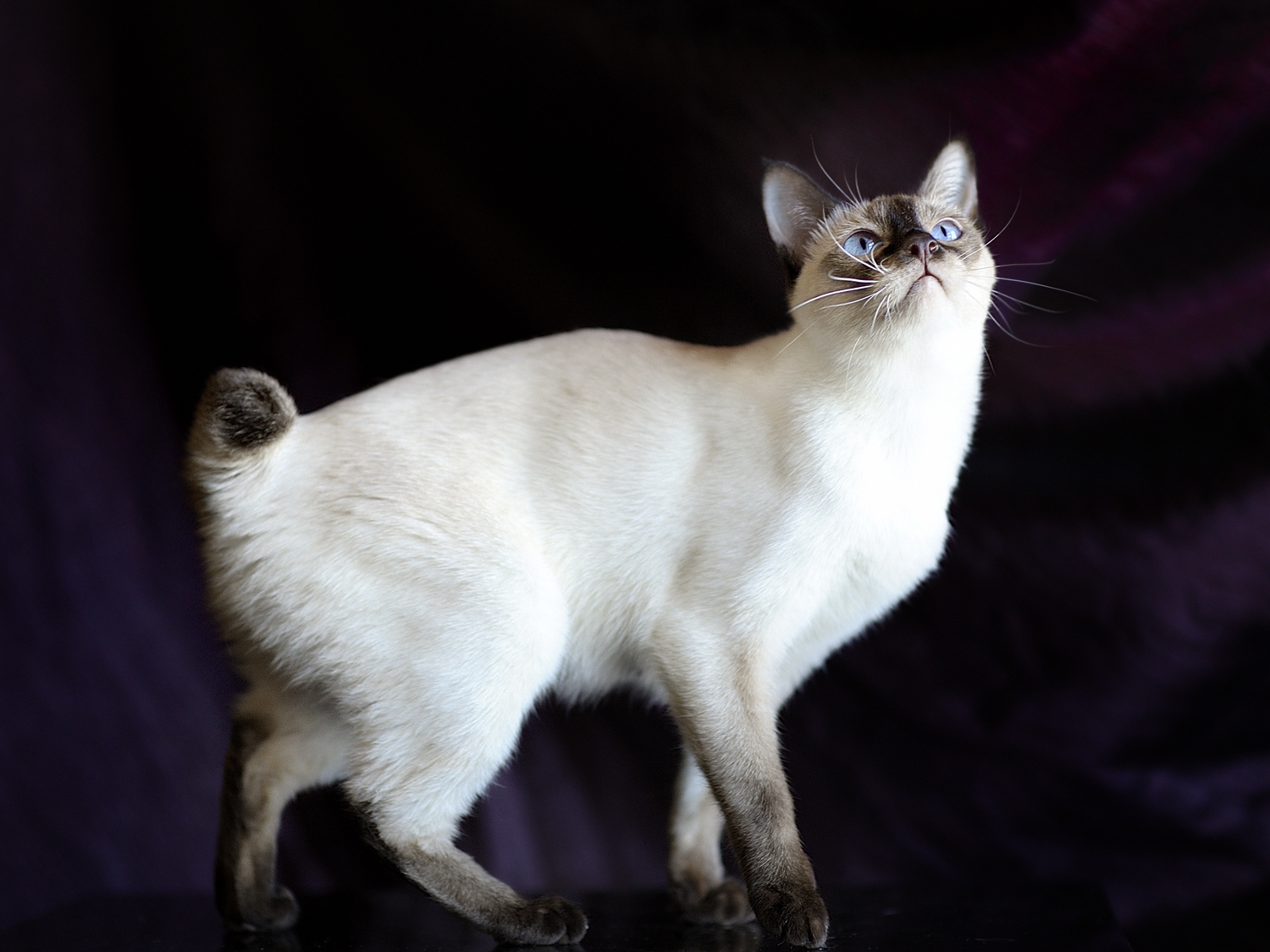
Chocolate-point Mekong Bobtail

Mekong Bobtails have a glossy, short coat that can be any pointed colour without white markings, and large eyes which the WCF's breed standard terms an "intense blue". The characteristic bobbed, kinked tail contains at least three vertebrae, but must be shorter than a quarter of the body length. The breed has a slight although rectangular build, and the rump is higher than the shoulders. Mekong Bobtails are medium-sized cats, weighing from 8 to 10 pounds (3.6 to 4.5 kg).

The breed is friendly, affectionate, and active.

== In legend ==
The ancestors of the Mekong Bobtail which were given to Nicholas II were considered royal cats in Siam. They were also thought to be guardians of temples.
