= Colorpoint Shorthair =

Breed of cat

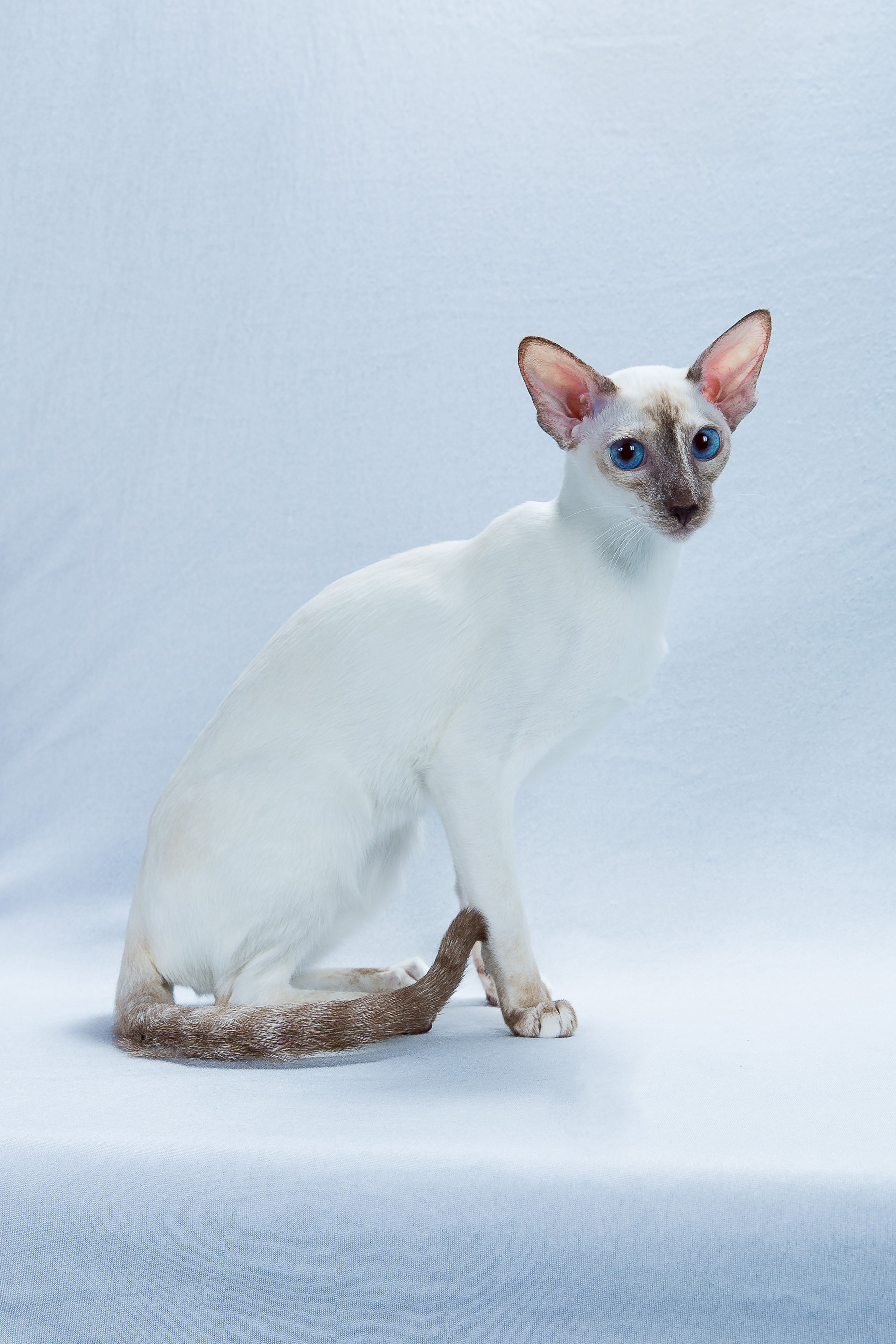
- Chocolate-Tortie Colorpoint Shorthair cat
- Origin: Thailand; United States

Breed standards
- CFA: standard

The Colorpoint Shorthair or Colourpoint Shorthair is a variety of Siamese cat. The only major registries to recognise them are the Cat Fanciers' Association (CFA) and the World Cat Federation (WCF). This breed was established from breeding American Shorthairs with the Siamese to produce different point colors, beyond the four standard Siamese colors.

== History ==
=== Origin ===
Circa 1948 breeders in the US and UK wished to introduce new colorings into the Siamese — specifically red. The first Colorpoint Shorthair was bred from a red (ginger) tabby American Shorthair and a seal point Siamese.

=== Breed recognition ===
In 1964 the Colorpoint Shorthair achieved championship status with the CFA, with cream and red point being the only recognised colours at the time. By 1969 the CFA would allow lynx and tortoiseshell point colorings. The breed is currently also recognised by the WCF under the name “Colourpoint Shorthair”, although without a published standard. It is not recognised as a breed by The International Cat Association, the Governing Council of the Cat Fancy, and Fédération Internationale Féline.

== Appearance ==
The Colorpoint Shorthair should have the appearance of a Siamese in type. It's a medium sized and slender cat with good muscle. The head has a long and tapering wedge and is of medium size in good proportion to the body. The gap between the eyes should be less than the size of the eye. The skull is flat. The neck is long and slender. Nose is long and straight. The ears are large, wide at the base, and pointed. The eyes are blue and almond shaped of medium size. The abdomen should be tight and hips shouldn't be wider than shoulders. The legs are long and slim. The tail is long and thin.

=== Coat ===
The color may be shaded or clear. The color may darken as the cat ages; however there is a contrast between the body color and the point colour.

==== Colorpoint colors ====
===== Solid color point colors =====
- Red Point: body is a clear white, points are bright apricot to deep red.
- Cream Point: body is a clear white, points are a pale buff cream to lightish pink.

===== Lynx point colors =====
- Seal Lynx Point: body is cream or pale fawn, points are dark seal browns bars distinguished and separated by lighter background color.
- Chocolate Lynx Point: body is ivory, points are warm milk chocolate bars distinguished and separated by lighter background color.
- Blue Lynx Point: body is bluish white to platinum grey, cold in tone, points are deep blue-grey bars distinguished and separated by lighter background color.
- Lilac Lynx Point: body is glacial white, points are frosty grey with pinkish tone bars distinguished and separated by lighter background color.
- Red Lynx Point: body is white, points are bars of pale buff cream to light pinkish cream distinguished and separated by lighter background color.
- Seal-Tortie Lynx Point: Same as seal lynx point but with possibility of mottling coat.
- Chocolate-Tortie Lynx Point: Same as chocolate lynx point but with possibility of mottling coat.
- Blue-Cream Lynx Point: Same as blue lynx point but with possibility of cream mottling coat.
- Lilac-Cream Lynx Point: Same as lilac lynx point but with possibility of cream mottling coat.

===== Parti-color point colors =====
- Seal-Tortie Point: body is pale fawn to cream, body color may be mottled with cream, points are seal brown mottled with red or cream.
- Chocolate-Tortie Point: body is ivory and may be mottled, points are warm-milk chocolate mottled with red or cream.
- Blue-Cream Point: body is bluish white to platinum grey, cold in tone, body color may be mottled, points are deep blue-grey mottled with cream.
- Lilac-Cream Point: body is glacial white, points are frosty grey with pinkish tone mottled with red or cream.

== Gallery ==
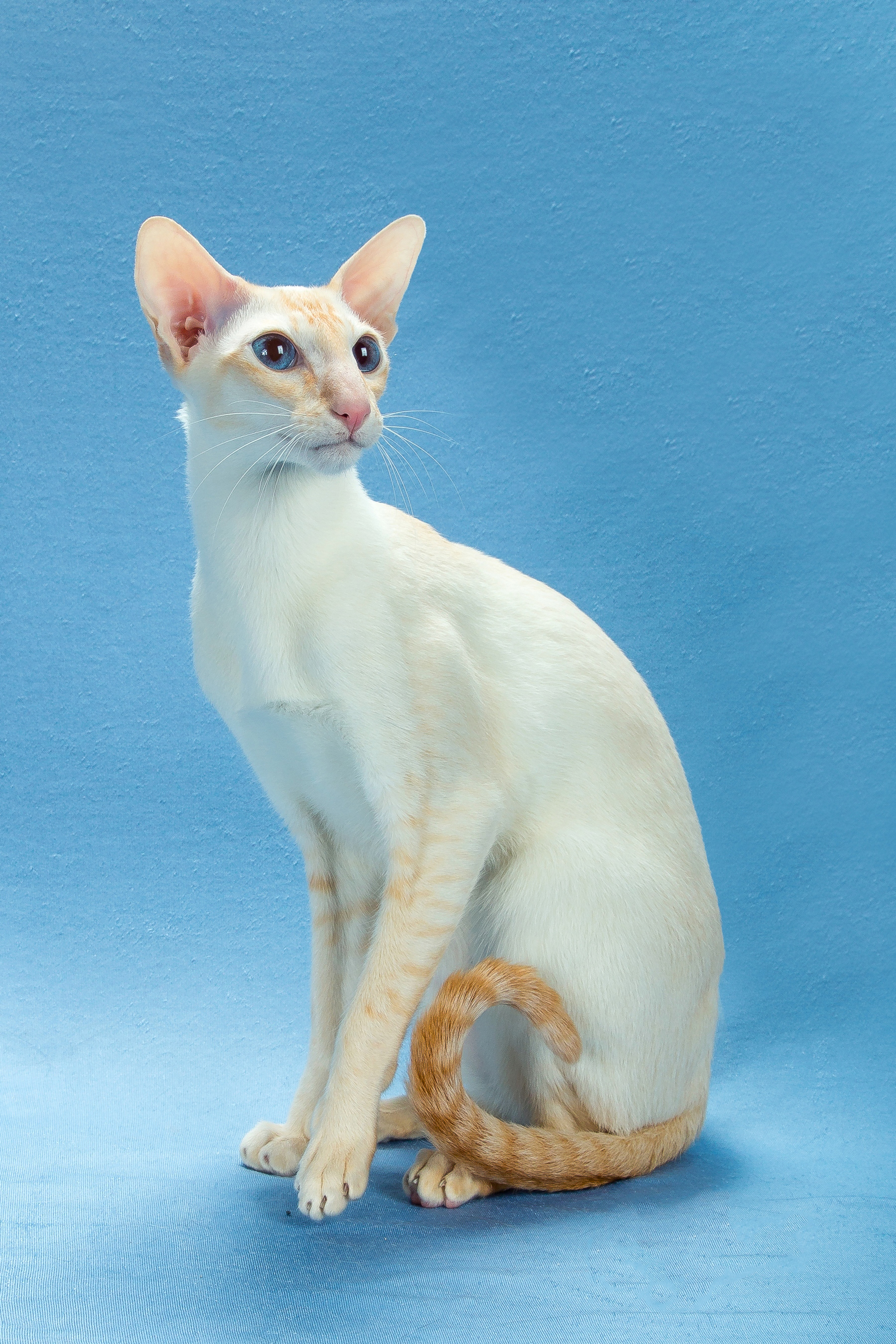
Red-point colourpoint shorthair

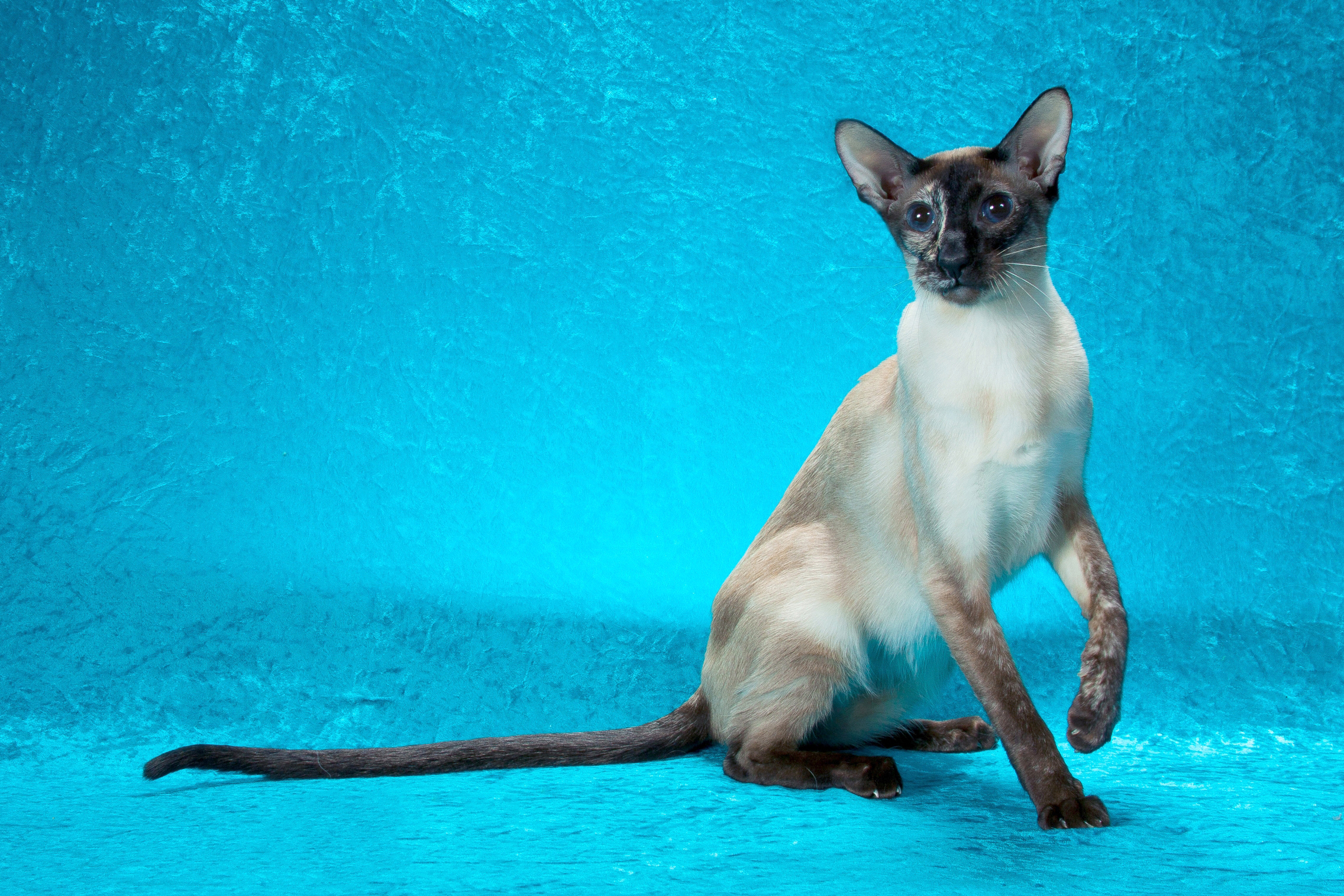
Tortie colourpoint shorthair

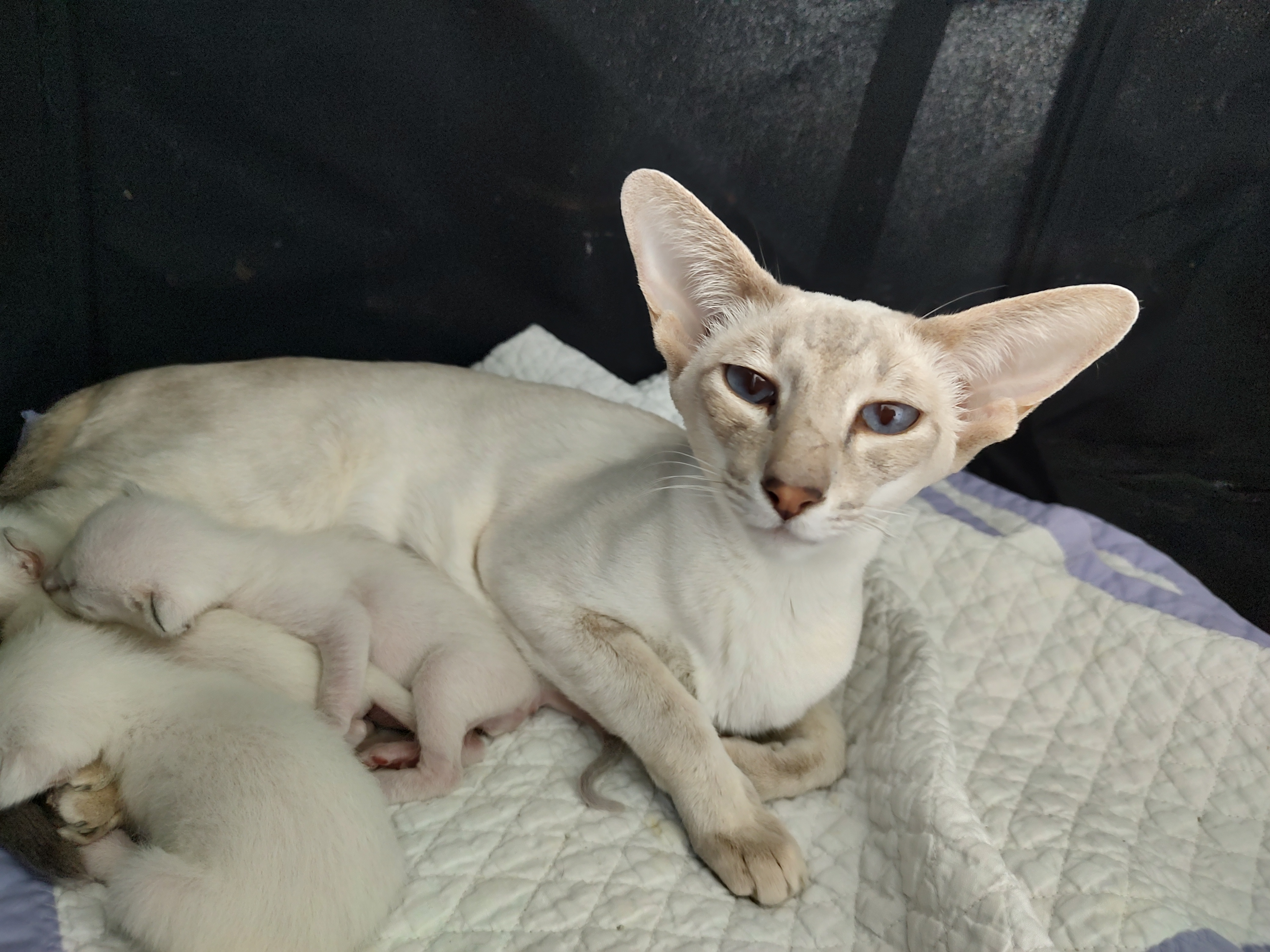
A Lilac Lynx Point Queen with Kittens

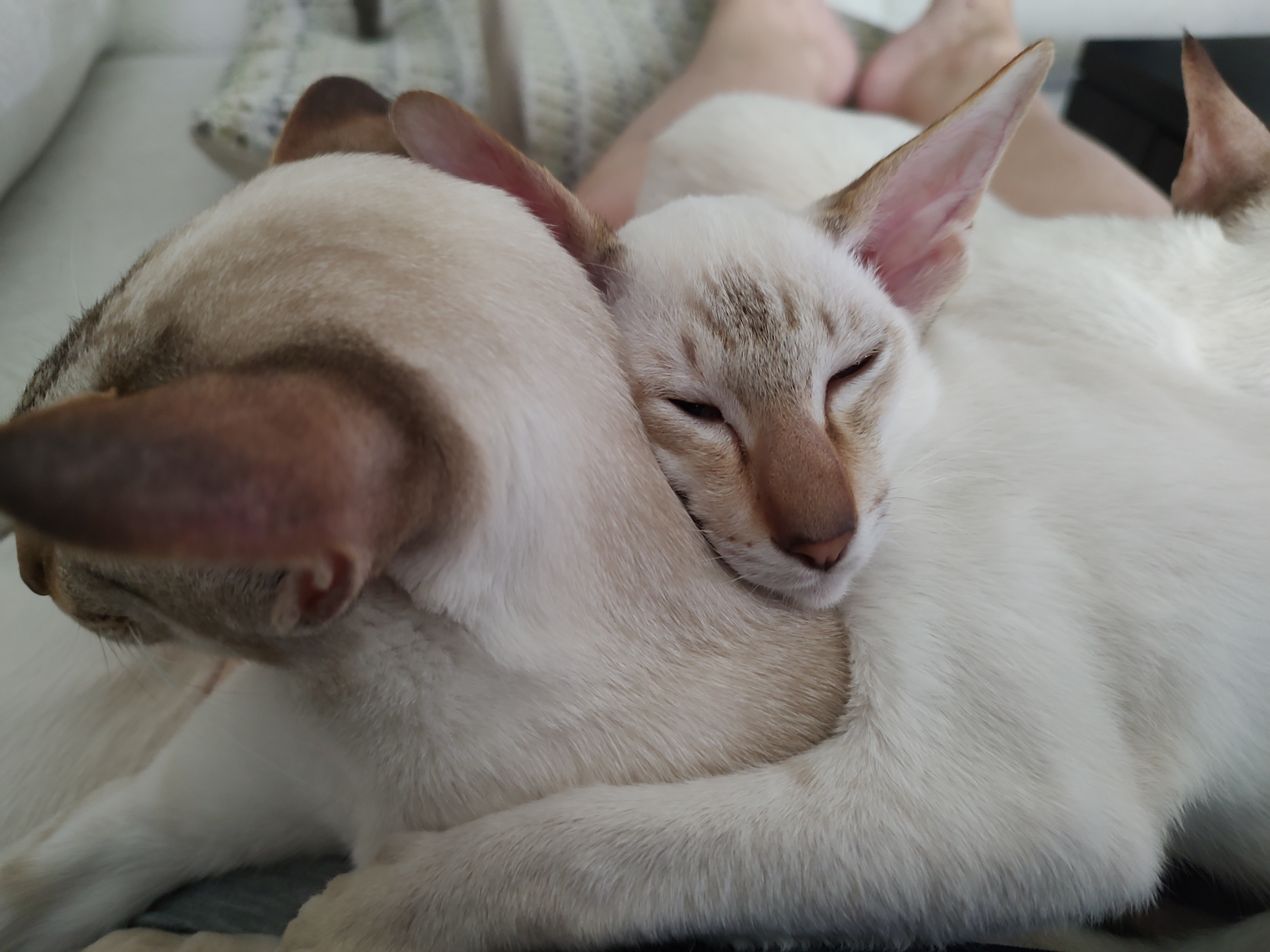
Two Chocolate Lynx Point Colorpoint Shorthairs

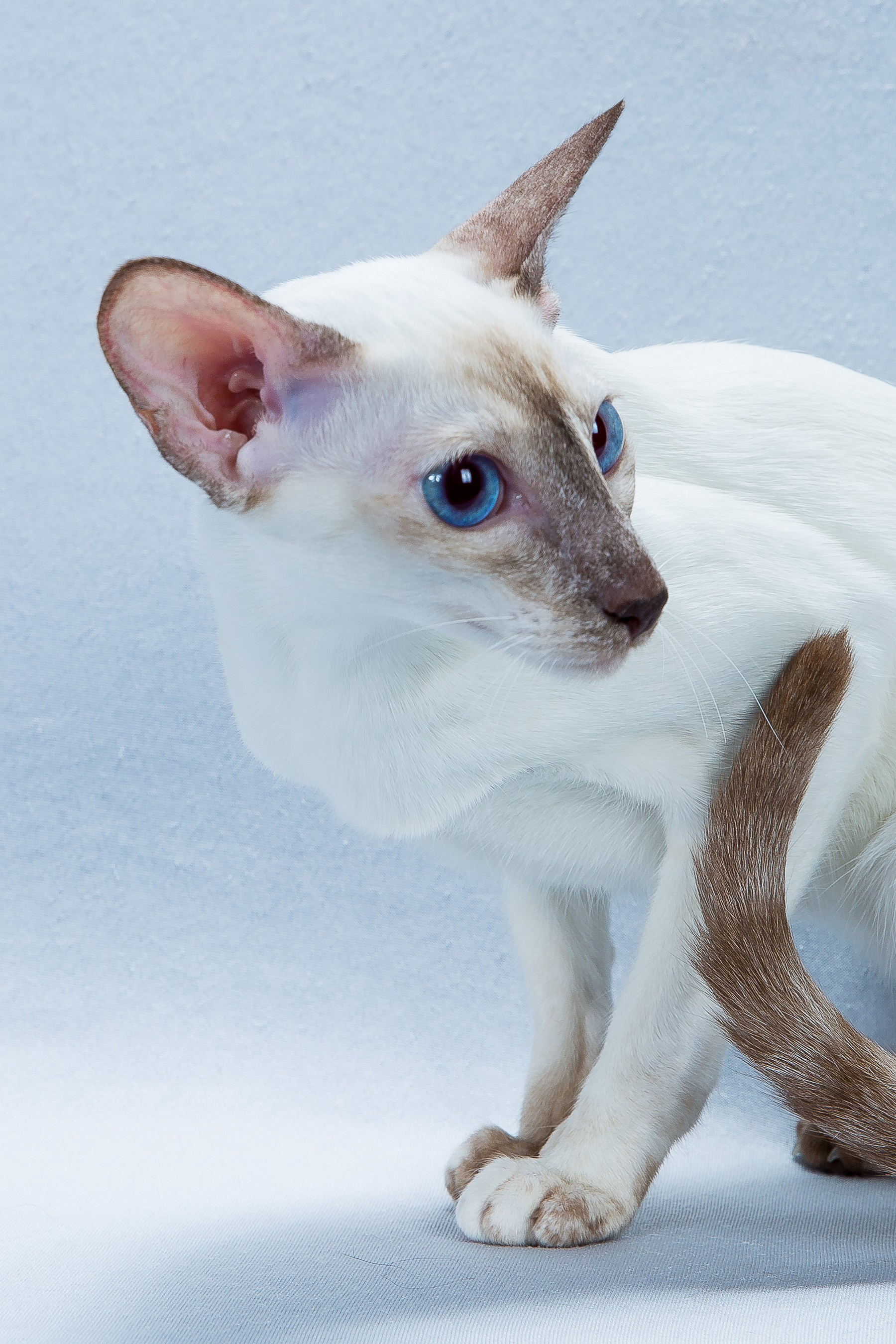
Chocolate tortie colourpoint shorthair

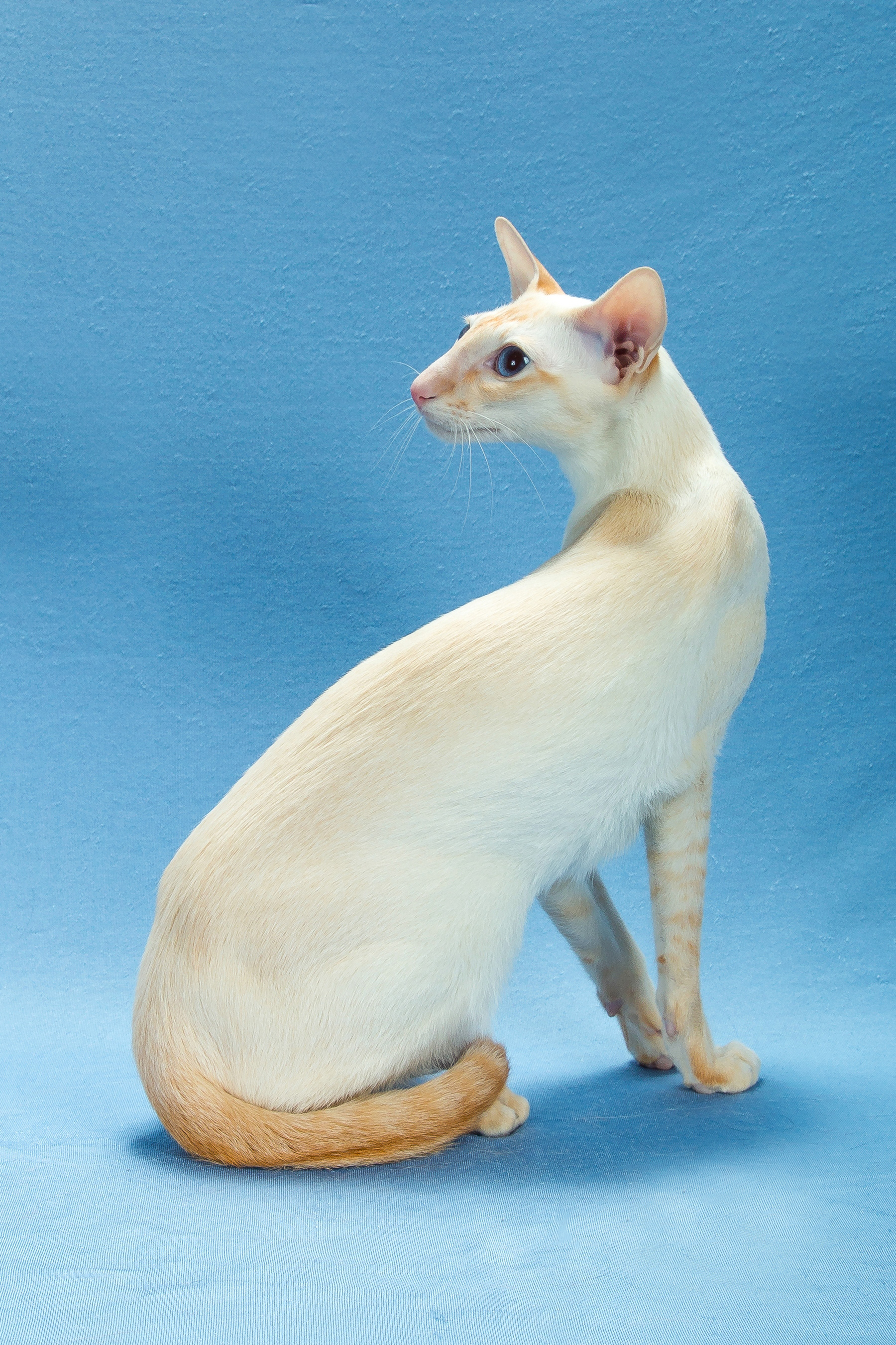
Red point colourpoint shorthair

== See also ==
- Cat coat genetics
- Tabby cat
- Bicolor cat
