= Siamese cat =

Breed of domestic cat

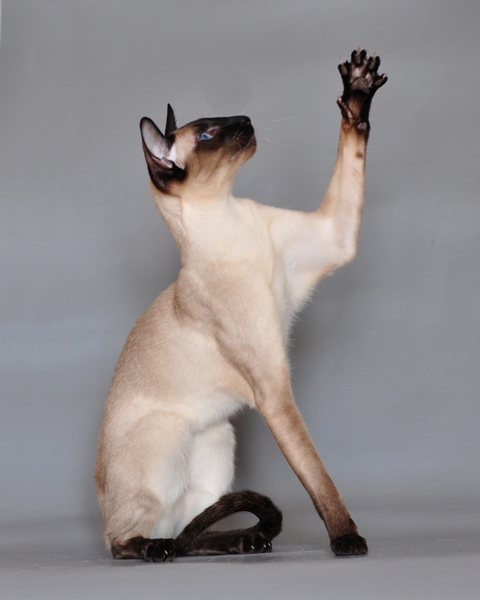
- Seal point adult
- Common nicknames: Meezer, Mese, Sagwa
- Origin: Thailand
- Foundation bloodstock: Wichianmat landrace

Breed standards
- CFA: standard
- FIFe: standard
- TICA: standard
- ACF: standard
- ACFA/CAA: standard
- CCA-AFC: standard
- GCCF: standard

Notes
- The traditional "old-style" (rounder-built) cats were split off from the Siamese breed and re-established by multiple registries as the separate Thai cat breed.

The Siamese cat (Thai: แมวไทย, Maeo Thai; แมวสยาม, Maeo Sayam; แมววิเชียรมาศ, Maeo Wichien Maat) is one of the first distinctly recognised breeds of domestic cat. It is selectively bred since the end of the 19th-century from the Wichianmat landrace, one of several varieties of cats native to Thailand (known as Siam before 1939), and is pedigreed in all major cat fancier and breeder organisations. Siamese cats have a distinctive colourpoint coat, resulting from a temperature-sensitive type of albinism. Distinct features like blue almond-shaped eyes, a triangular wedged head shape, large wide-set ears, an elongated, slender, and muscular body, and various colours of point colouration characterise the breed.

The breed was one of the most popular cat breeds in Europe and North America in the 19th century. Around the 1950s, the modern-style body with slender and angular features became the preferred type by Siamese enthusiasts. From the 1980s onwards, the traditional "old-style" (rounder-built) cats started to officially split off from the (modern-style) Siamese breed and were re-established by multiple registries as the separate Thai cat breed. The terms "Siamese" or "Thai" are used for cats from these specific breeds, which are by definition all purebred cats with a known and formally registered ancestry, also known as the cat's pedigree or "paperwork".

The Siamese is used as foundation stock in several new cat breeds; by crossbreeding them with other cats. The Oriental and Colourpoint Shorthair were developed to expand the range of Siamese coat patterns. Crossbreeding with Persians resulted in a long-haired colourpoint variant called the Himalayan. The long-haired Siamese is recognised internationally as the Balinese. Crossbreeding also introduced Siamese features in several hair-mutation breeds, including the Cornish Rex, Sphynx, and Peterbald.

== History ==
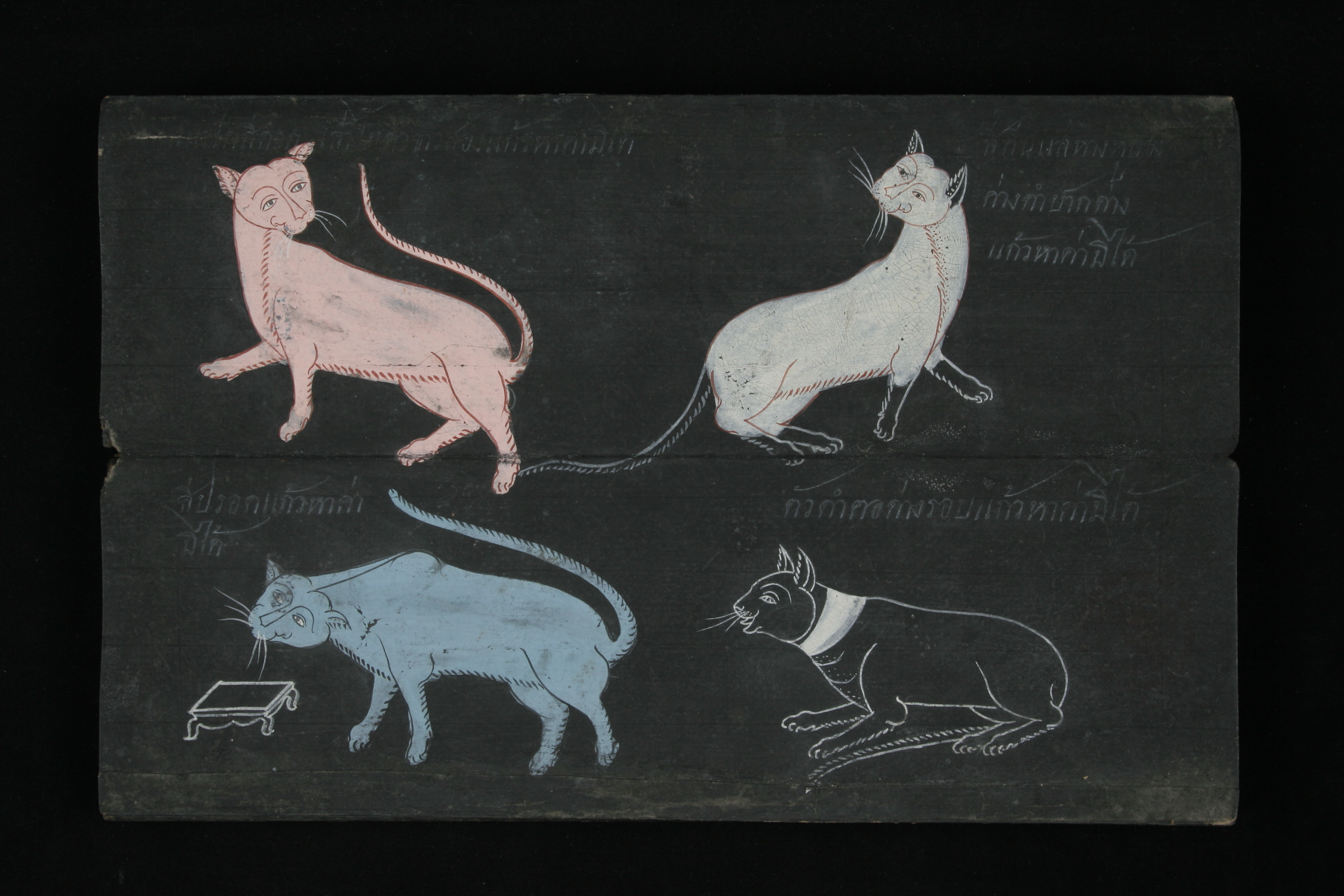
Suphalak cat, Siamese cat, Korat cat and Ninlachak cat in Tamra Maew (The Cat-Book Poems) are thought to originate from the Ayutthaya Kingdom (1351 to 1767 AD). Over a dozen are now kept in the National Library of Thailand.

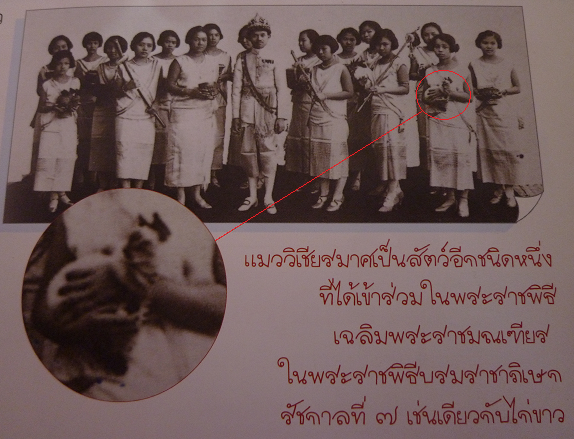
King Prajadhipok following his coronation day, surrounded by the court ladies carrying his regalia and Wichianmat cat, which symbolises "domesticity".

=== Thailand origins ===
A description and depiction of the Wichianmat (colourpointed landrace cat in Siam) first appears in a collection of ancient manuscripts called the Tamra Maew (The Cat-Book Poems), thought to originate from the Ayutthaya Kingdom (1351 to 1767 AD). Over a dozen are now kept in the National Library of Thailand. The manuscripts have resurfaced outside of Thailand and are now in the British Library and National Library of Australia.

At the end of the Burmese–Siamese war, the capital was sacked on 7 April 1767. The Burmese army burned everything in sight and returned to Burma, taking Siamese noblemen and royal family members with them as captives. A Thai legend states that the King of Burma Hsinbyushin found and read the poem of the Wichianmat cats in the Tamra Maew. The poem describes Wichianmat cats as being as rare as gold, and anyone who owns this cat will become wealthy. He told his army to round up all the cats and bring them back to Myanmar (Burma) along with the other treasures.

=== Western breed development ===
The pointed cat known as the "Siamese", recognised for its distinctive markings, is selectively bred in the West from the Wichianmat, one of several landraces of cats from Siam described and illustrated in the Tamra Maew manuscripts, estimated to have been written from the 14th to the 18th century. In 1878, US President Rutherford B. Hayes received the first documented Siamese to reach the United States. The cat, named "Siam," was sent from Bangkok to the US Consul. In 1884, the British Consul-General in Bangkok, Edward Blencowe Gould (1847–1916), brought a breeding pair of the cats, Pho and Mia (พ่อและแม่), back to Britain as a gift for his sister, Lilian Jane Gould (who, married in 1895 as Lilian Jane Veley, went on to co-found the Siamese Cat Club in 1901). In 1885, Gould's UK cats Pho and Mia produced three Siamese kittens—Duen Ngai (เดือนหงาย), Kalohom (กลาโหม), and Khromata (กรมท่า)—who were shown with their parents that same year at London's Crystal Palace Show. Their appearance and behaviour attracted attention, but all three of the kittens died soon after the show, their cause of death not documented.

Wankee, born in 1895 to foundation stock parents in Hong Kong, became the first UK champion in 1898.

By 1886, four Siamese cats were imported to the UK by Eva Forestier Walker (surnamed Vyvyan after 1887 marriage) and her sister, Ada. These Siamese imports were long, had rounded heads with wedge-shaped muzzles, and large ears. The cats ranged from substantial to slender but were not either extreme. The difference in the pointed coat pattern had not been seen before in cats by Westerners.

Over the next several years, fanciers imported a small number of cats, forming the foundation stock for the entire breed in Britain. Due to digitalisation of the extensively kept ancestry paperwork by the cat registries, it is possible to trace the pedigree of most Siamese cats of today back to (one or more of) these original imports. In Britain, these original imports were called the "Royal Cat of Siam." Some reports say that they had previously been kept only by Siamese royalty. However, research does not show evidence of any organised royal breeding programme in Siam.

== Breed registration ==
=== Traditional versus modern style development ===
In the 1950s–60s, as the Siamese was increasing in popularity, many breeders and cat show judges began to favour the more slender look. Breeders created increasingly long, fine-boned, narrow-headed cats through generations of selective breeding. Eventually, the modern show Siamese was bred to be extremely elongated, with a lean, tubular body, long, slender legs, a very long, very thin tail that tapers gradually into a point, and a long, wedge-shaped head topped by extremely large, wide-set ears.

Comparison of seal point Siamese cats in the 1950s
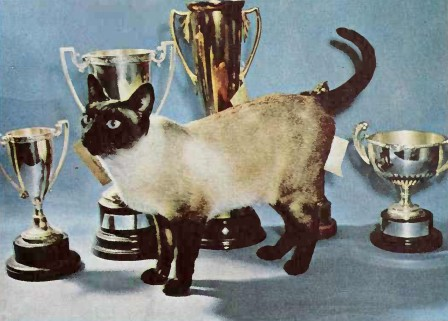
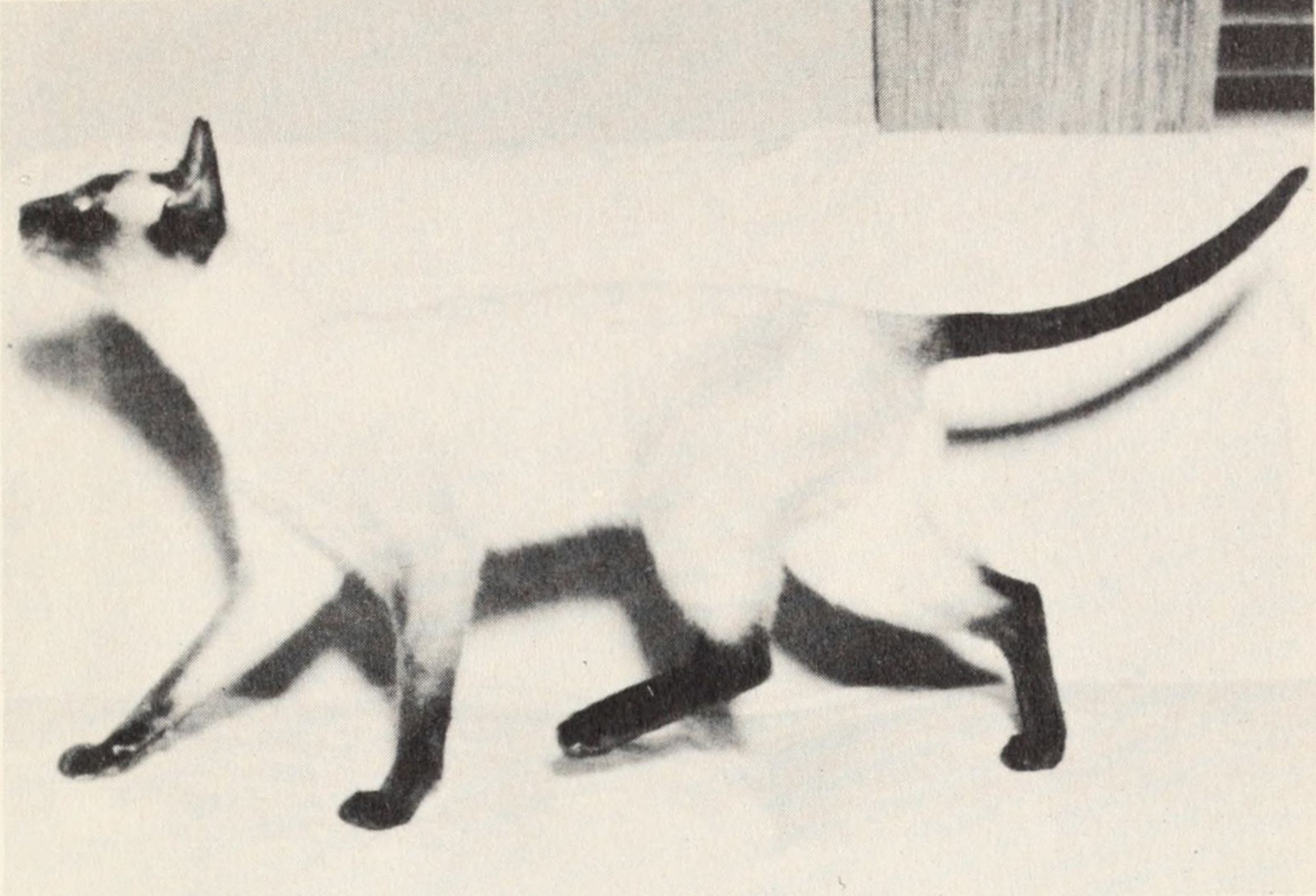
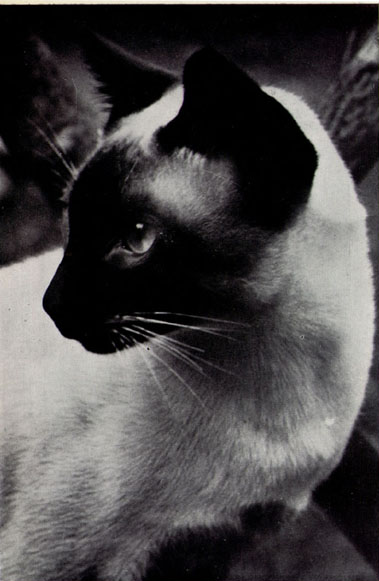
While some show quality specimen from the 1950s still exhibit relatively moderate characteristics, the breed standard was setting the stage for the modern Siamese, with its call for a "dainty, long and svelte" body, a long head that "taper[s] in straight lines from the ears to a narrow muzzle", "ears large and pricked, wide at the base" and tail "long and tapering".

==== Thai cat split-off ====
By the mid-1980s, cats of the traditional style had largely disappeared from cat shows. Still, a few breeders, particularly in the UK, continued to breed and register them, resulting in today's two types of standardised breed: the modern, "show-style" Siamese, and the "traditional" type, now Thai, both descended from the same distant Wichianmat landrace ancestors, but with few or no recent ancestors in common, and effectively forming distinct sub-breeds. As a result, from the 1980s onwards, multiple cat registries re-established the "traditional, old-style" breeding lines into a separate breed. In addition to the modern Siamese breed, The International Cat Association (TICA) and the World Cat Federation (WCF) now accept cats of the "old-style" type, and any Wichianmat cat imported directly from Thailand, under the new breed name Thai. Other unofficial nicknames for the Thai breed are "Old-style", "Classic", or "Traditional", with this variation (previously) derogatory nicknamed "Applehead" in the US.

Comparison of Thai (traditional) and Siamese (modern) cats

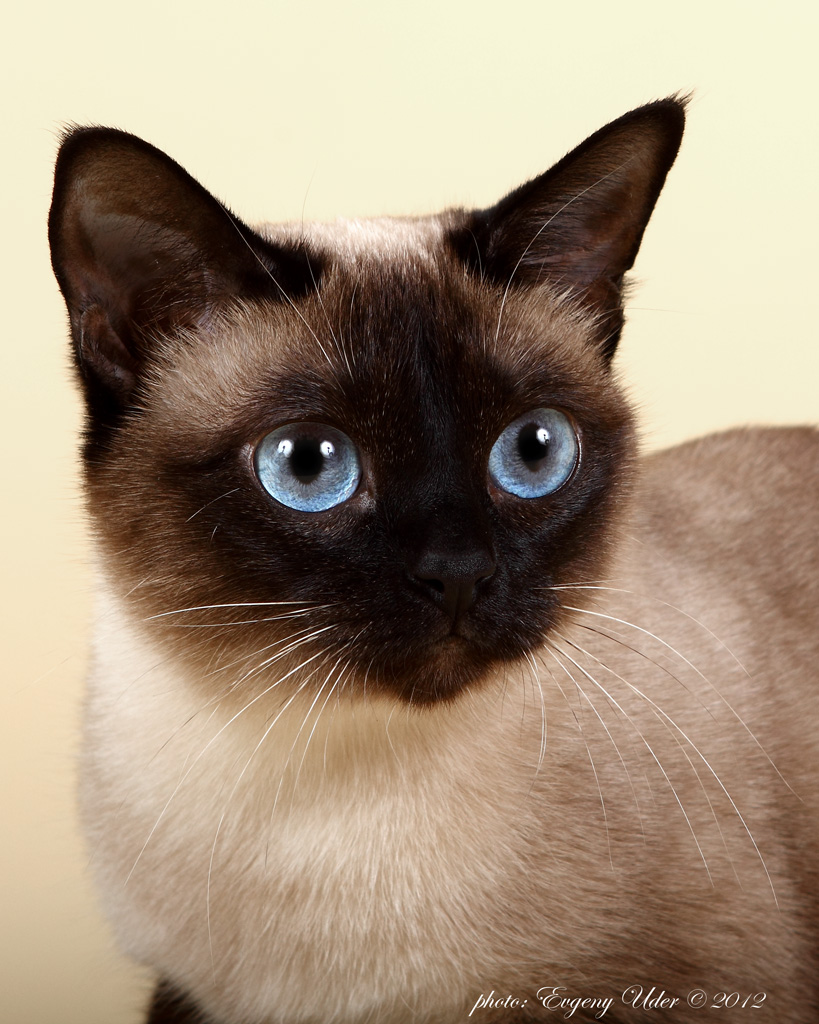
Seal point traditional Thai cat with a round head

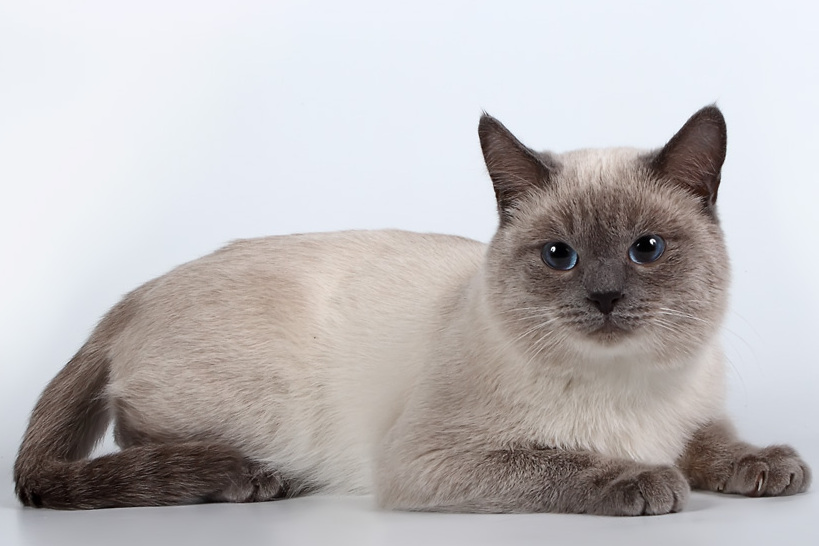
Blue point traditional Thai cat with a round head and a bulky-build body

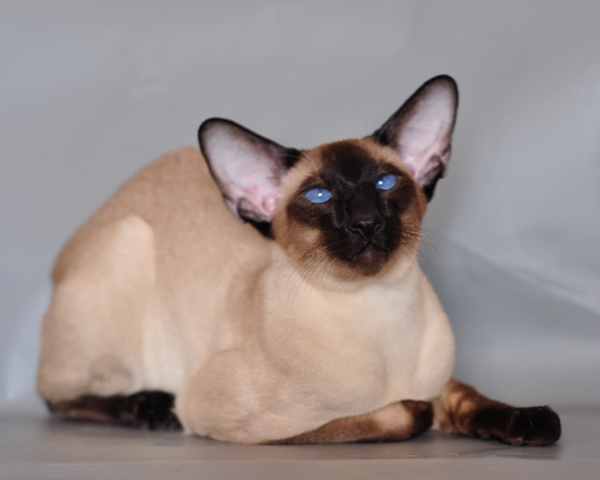
Seal point modern (front view) with the typical large, wide-set ears and a slender-build body

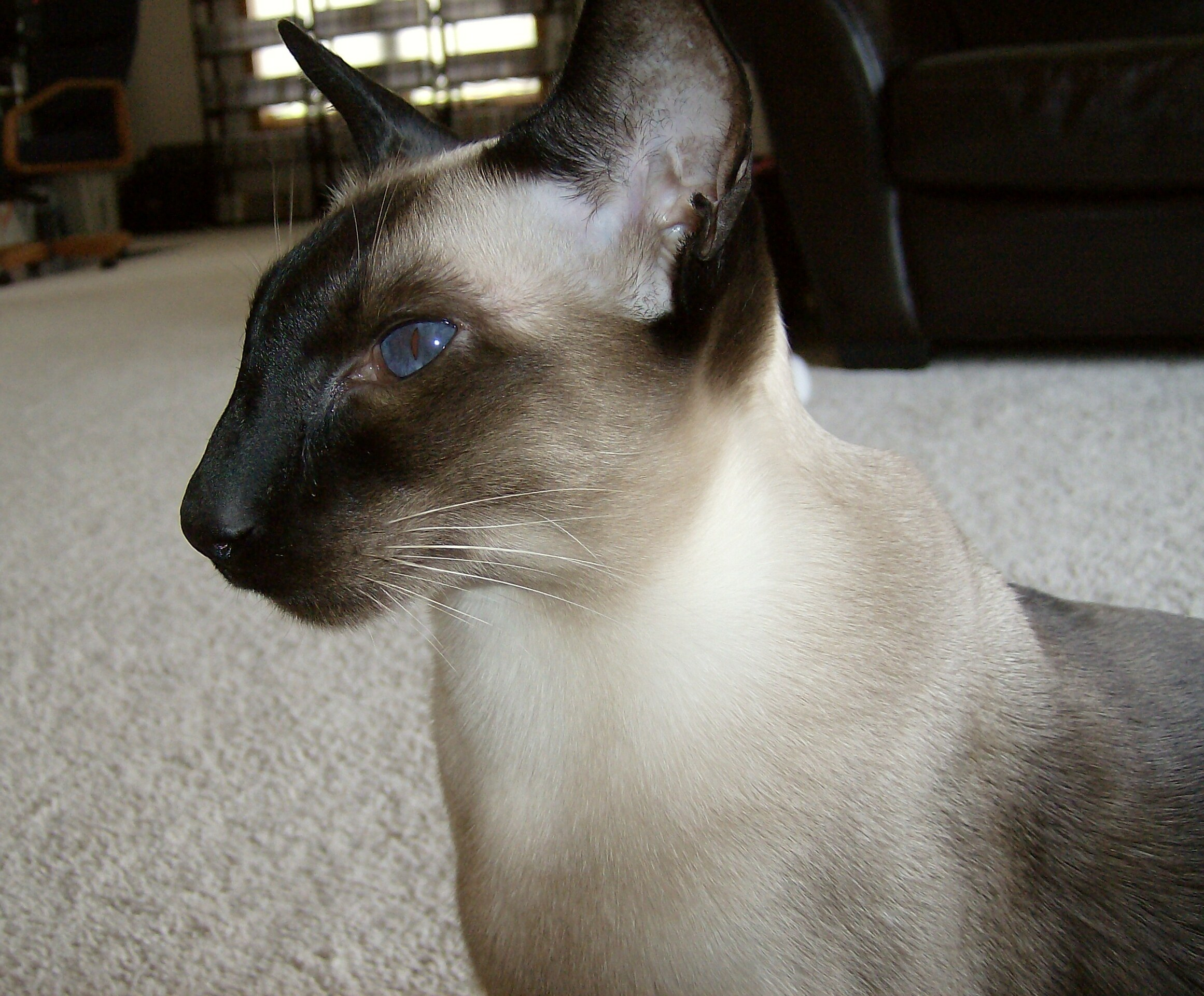
Seal point modern "wedge head" side profile

=== Popularity ===
In the 2024 statistics of FIFe, one of the major global cat registries, the breed ranked at position 17 out of 54 breeds in popularity, comprising 1% of their total registered kittens that year, which translates to 929 cats.

== Characteristics ==
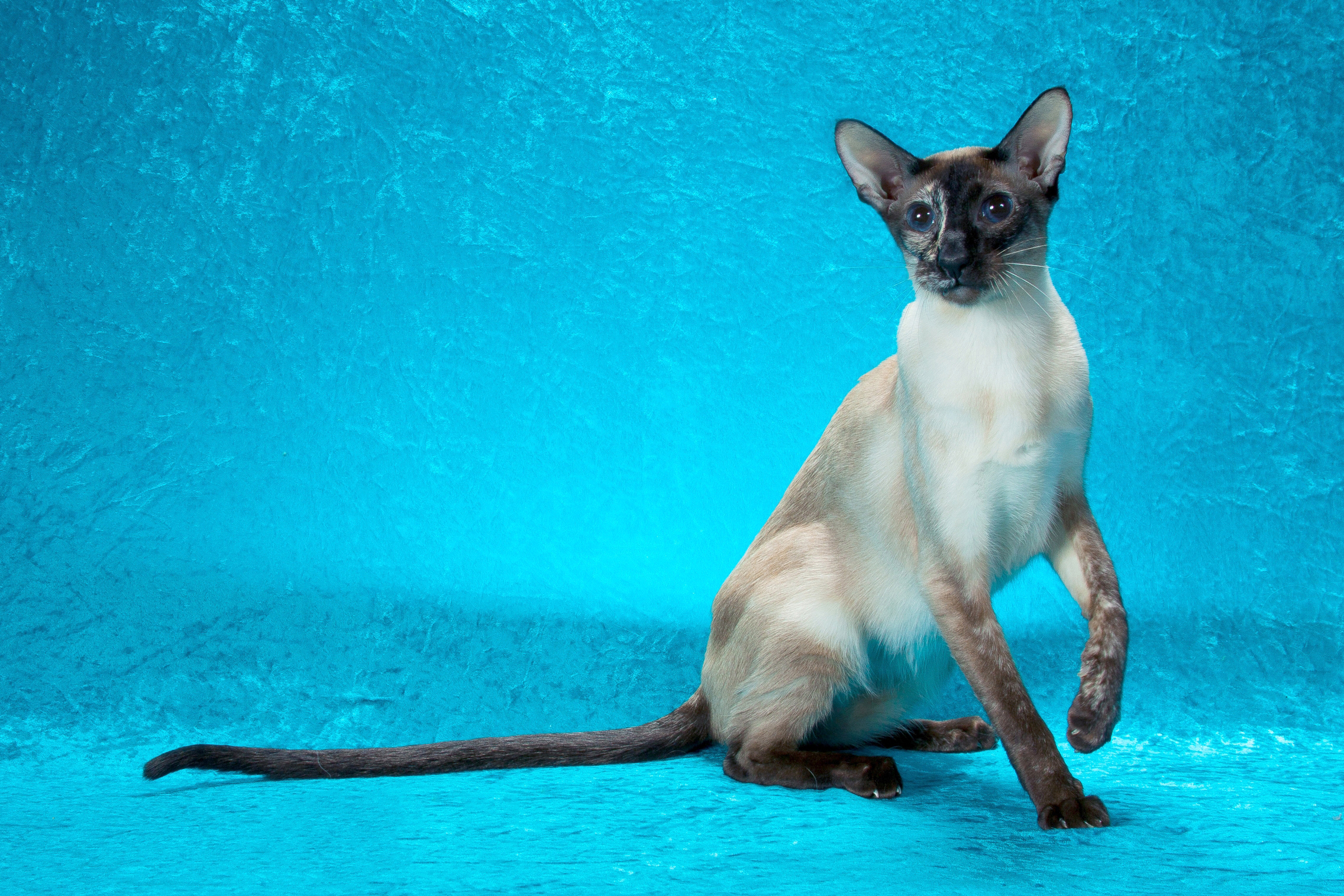
Seal tortoiseshell point. Note the darker colours at the extremities, e.g. face/ears, tail, and legs.

=== Appearance ===
The breed standard of the modern Siamese calls for an elongated, tubular, and muscular body and a triangular head, forming a triangle from the tip of the nose to each tip of the ear. The eyes are almond-shaped and light blue, while the ears are large, wide-based, and positioned more towards the side of the head. The breed has a long neck, a slender tail, and fur that is short, glossy, fine and adheres to the body with no undercoat. Its pointed colour scheme and blue eyes distinguish it from the closely related Oriental Shorthair. The modern Siamese shares the pointed colour pattern with the Thai, but they differ in head and body type.

Many foundation stock cats from Thailand had a kink in their tails, but over the years, this trait has been considered a flaw. Breeders have largely eradicated it around the 1950s, but the kinked tail persists among street cats in Thailand.

==== Colourpoint pattern ====
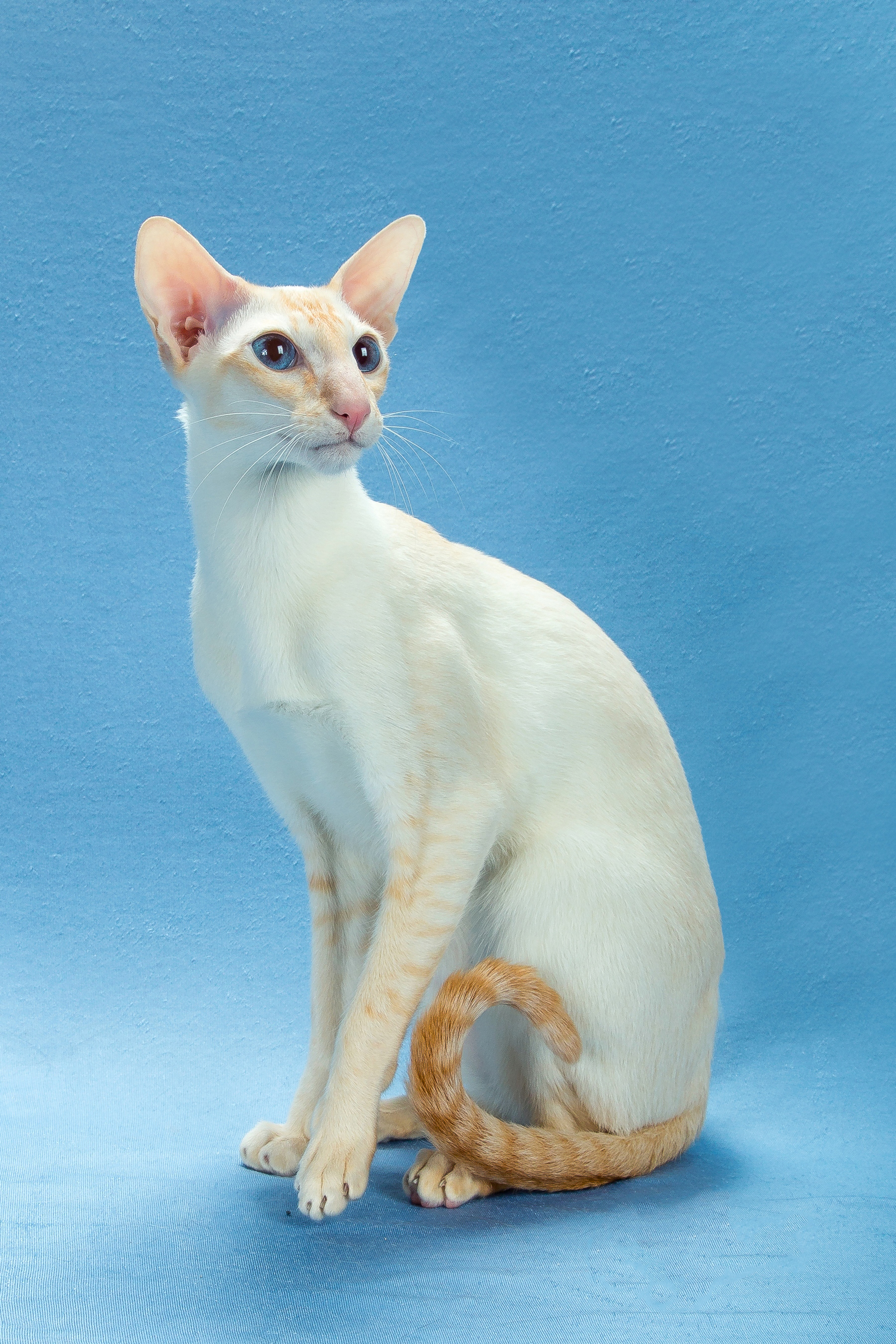
Red point

The colourpoint pattern is a form of partial albinism (acromelanism), resulting from a mutation in tyrosinase, an enzyme involved in melanin production. The mutated tyrosinase enzyme is heat-sensitive; it fails to work at normal body temperatures but becomes active in cooler (< 33 °C) areas of the skin. The heat-sensitive enzyme results in a dark colouration in the coolest parts of the cat's body, like the extremities and the face, which are cooled by the airflow through their sinuses.

Due to the temperature-sensitive pigmentation, Siamese cats tend to darken with age, and generally, adult Siamese living in warm climates have lighter coats than those in cool climates. Siamese kittens are cream to white at birth and develop visible points in the first few months of life in colder parts of their body. By the time a kitten is four weeks old, the points should be sufficiently distinguishable to recognise which colour they are.

==== Colour varieties ====
Originally the vast majority of Siamese had black ('seal'; extremely dark brown, almost black) points, but occasionally Siamese were born with blue (a cool grey) points, genetically a dilution of black point; chocolate (lighter brown) points, a genetic variation of black point; or lilac (pale warm grey) points, genetically a diluted chocolate. These colours were considered "inferior" black points and were not qualified for showing or breeding. These shades were eventually accepted by the breed associations and became more common through breeding programmes specifically aimed at producing these colours. Later, outcrosses with other breeds developed Siamese-mix cats with points in other cat colours and patterns, including red and cream points, tabby (US English: 'lynx') points, and tortoiseshell ('tortie') points.

In most cat registries, all pointed Siamese-style cats are considered part of the Siamese breed. The allowed colourpoint colourations in the Siamese are: (Note: The CFA (predominantly operating in the US), considers only the four original solid fur colours as Siamese: black ('seal'), blue, chocolate, and lilac point. Siamese cats with points in colours or patterns aside from these four are considered Colourpoint Shorthair in the CFA registry. The WCF has also adopted this classification, treating the Colourpoint Shorthair as a distinct breed.)

- black ('seal')
- blue
- chocolate
- lilac
- cinnamon
- fawn
- red
- cream
- caramel or apricot

These base colours are allowed in combination with the following patterns and effects:

- solid or tabby (US: 'lynx')
- tortoiseshell ('tortie')
- silver tabby or smoke
- white spotting (completely white cats may fall under the Foreign White breed)

=== Behaviour ===
Siamese are usually very affectionate and intelligent cats, renowned for their social nature. Many enjoy being with people and are sometimes described as "extroverts". Often they bond strongly with a single person. Myrna Milani describes the Siamese as being more diurnal, more likely to stay close to their owner, and less likely to hunt than other cats.

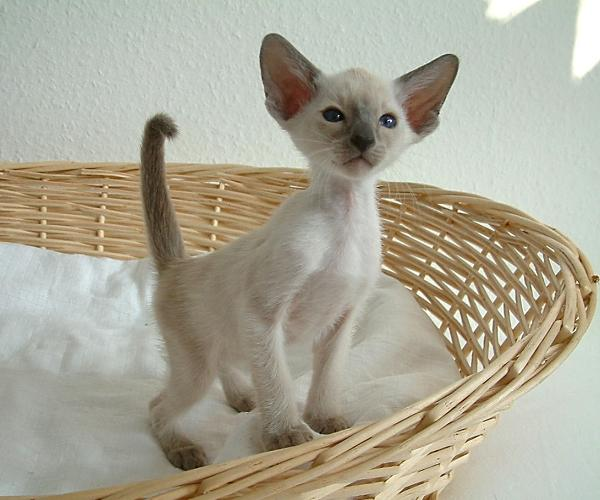
Blue point kitten

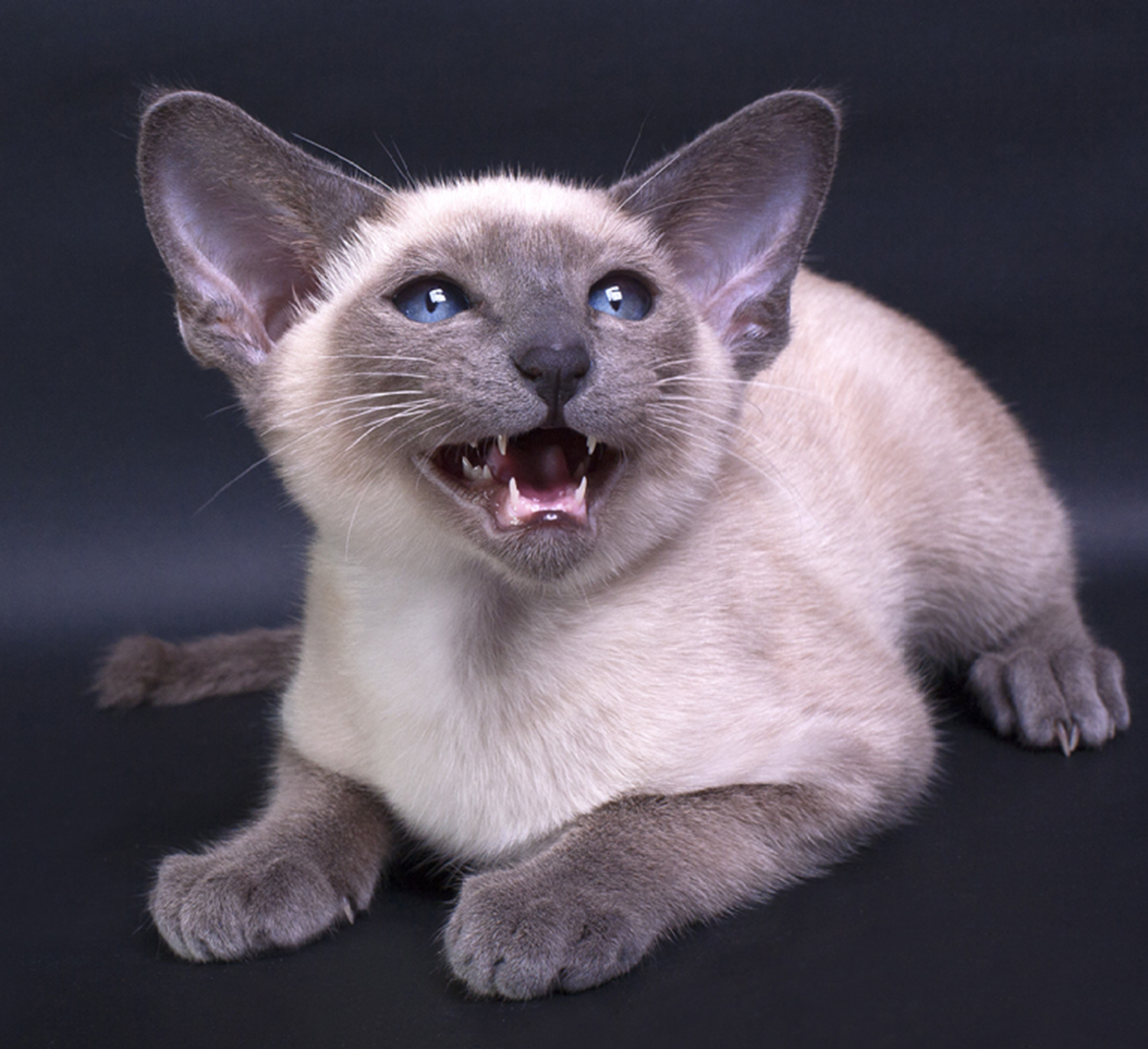
Blue point kitten

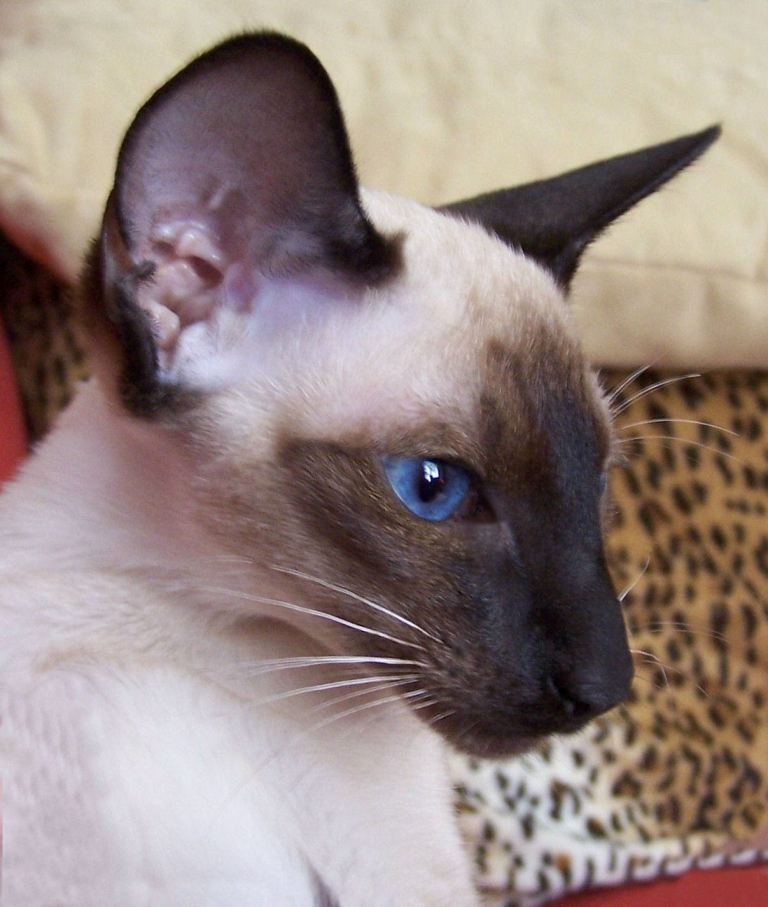
Typical side view of the head of a seal point adult

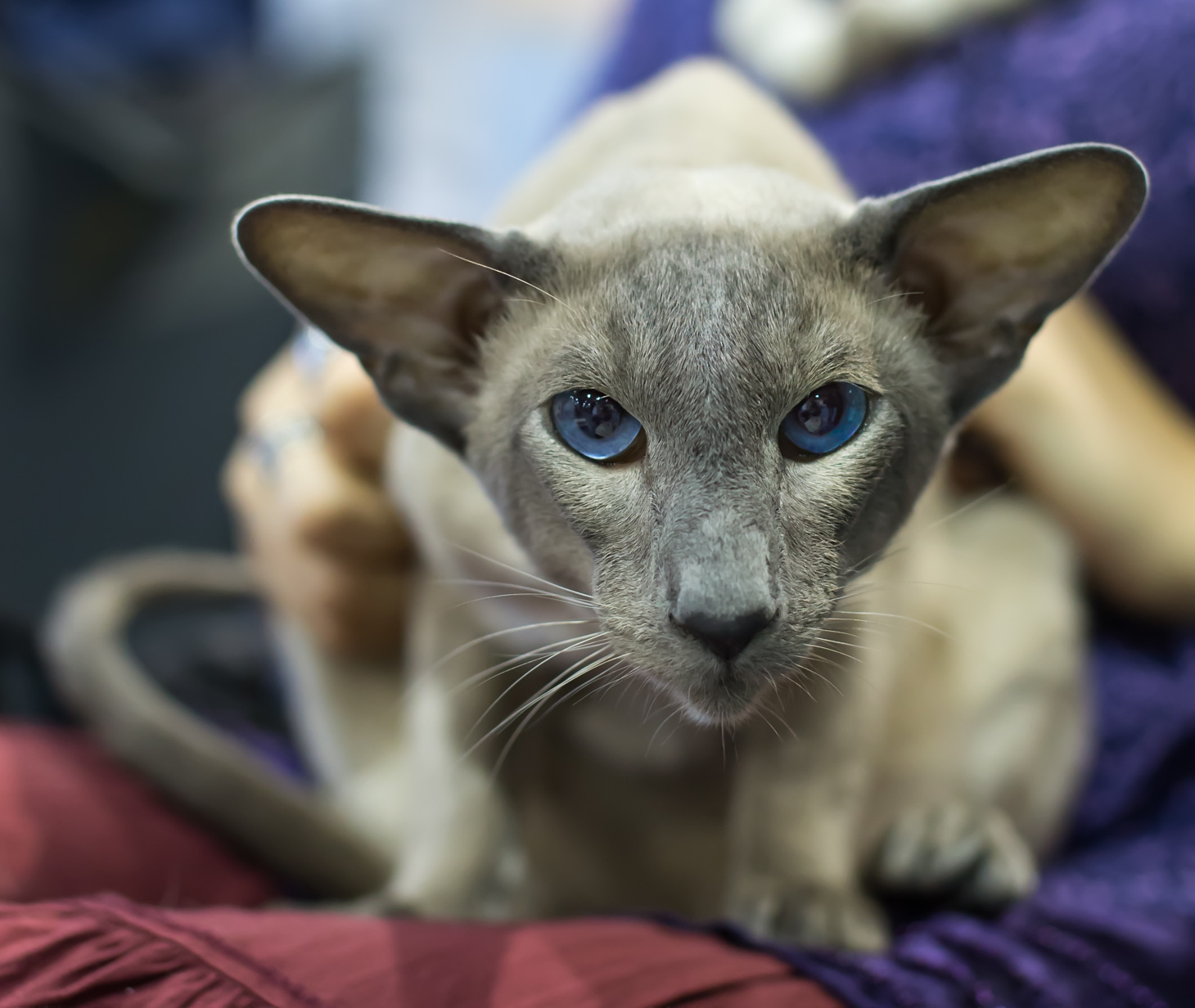
Blue point adult, with more modern features

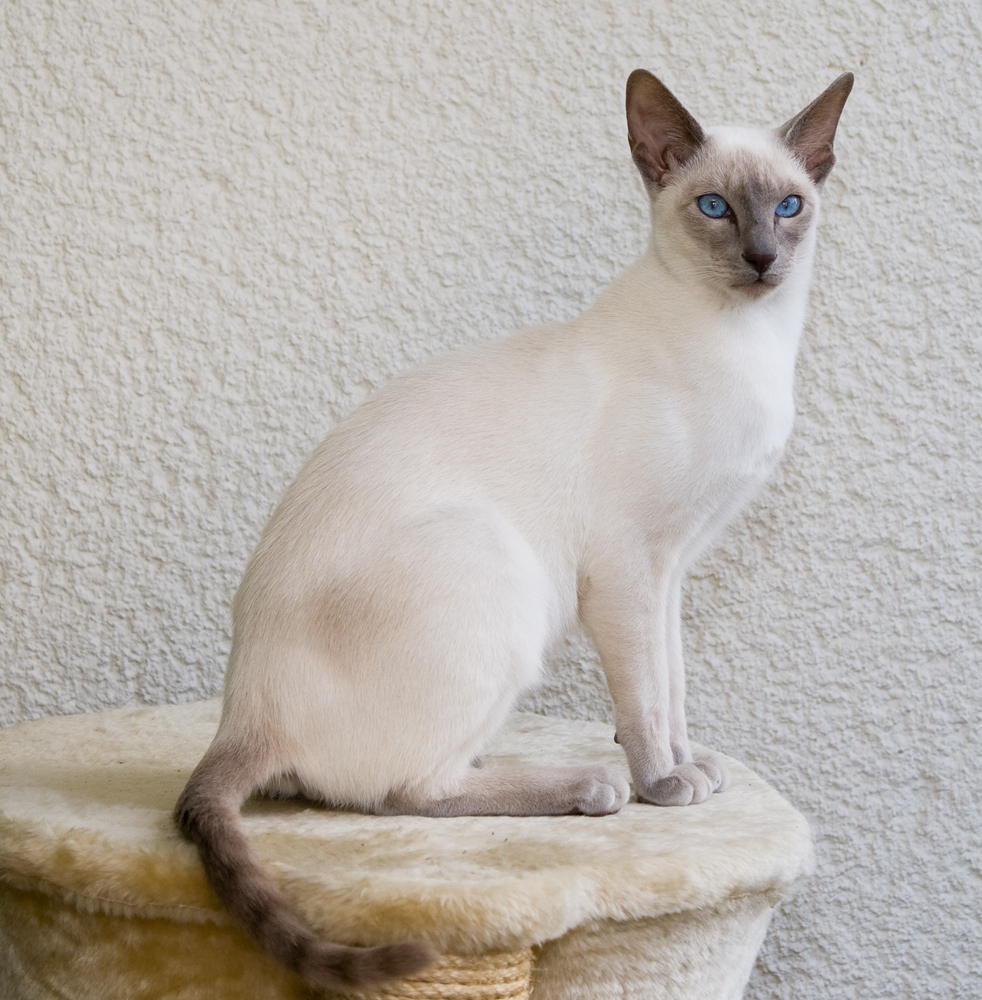
Lilac point adult, with more moderate features

Meow or “Meezer” of a Siamese cat

== Health ==
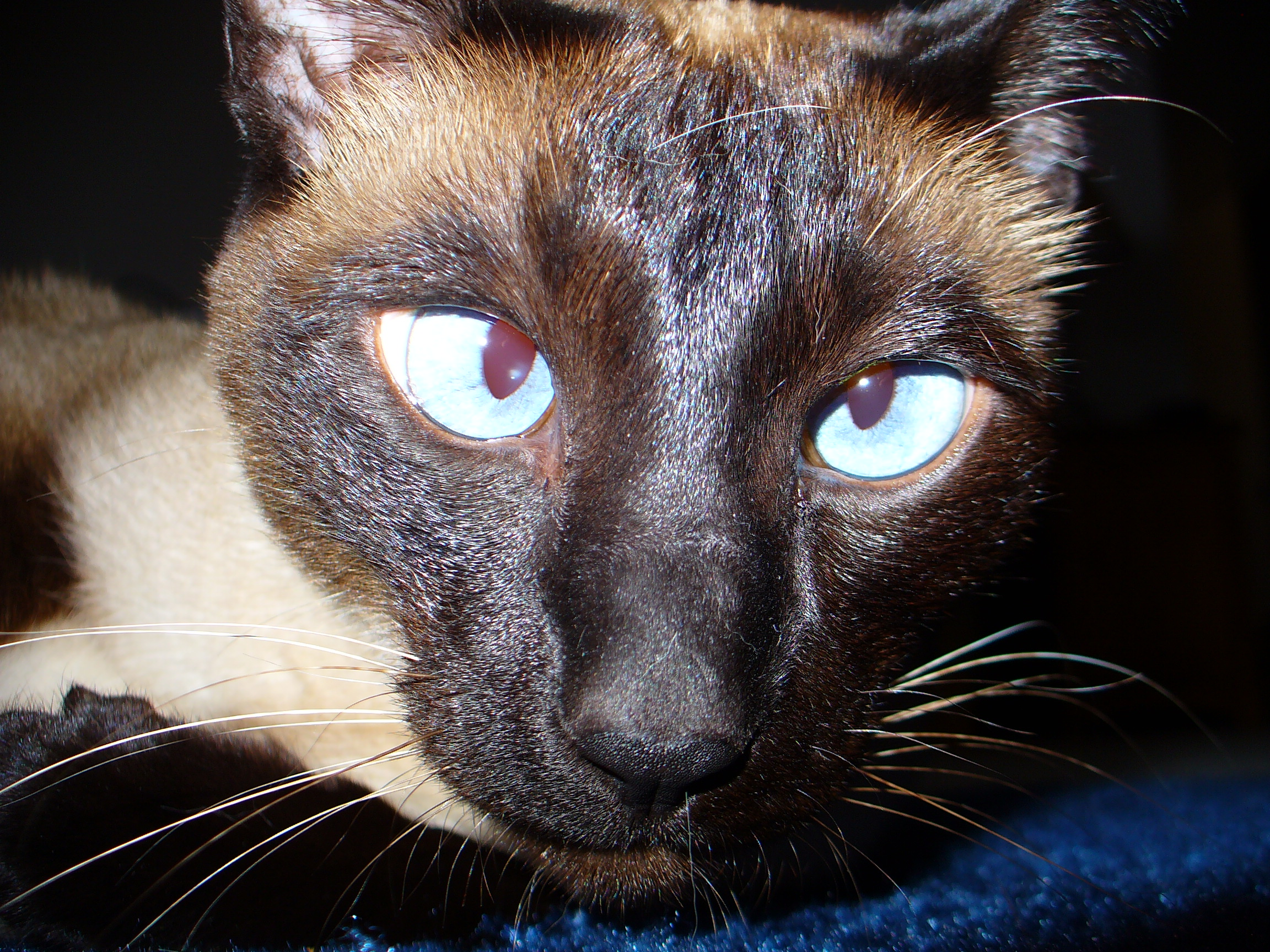
This Siamese cat demonstrates the once common cross-eyed trait that has largely been bred out.

Based on Swedish insurance data, which tracked cats only up to 12.5 years, Siamese and Siamese-derived breeds have a higher mortality rate than other breeds. 68% lived to 10 years or more and 42% to 12.5 years or more. The majority of deaths were caused by neoplasms, mainly mammary tumours. The Siamese also has a higher rate of morbidity. They are at higher risk of neoplastic and gastrointestinal problems but have a lower risk of feline lower urinary tract disease. A UK study of veterinary records found a life expectancy of 11.69 years for the Siamese compared with 11.74 years overall.

The same albino allele that produces coloured points also results in abnormal neurological connections between the eye and the brain. The optic chiasm has abnormal uncrossed wiring; many early Siamese were cross-eyed to compensate, but like the kinked tails, the crossed eyes have been seen as a fault, and due to selective breeding the trait is far less common today. Unlike many other blue-eyed white cats, Siamese cats do not have reduced hearing ability.

The Siamese suffers from abnormal visual projections due to the lateral geniculate body of the eye differing from normal felines. Fibres located in the temporal retina cross over in the chiasm instead of remaining uncrossed. The breed has also been found to have a predisposition to progressive retinal atrophy.

The Siamese is predisposed to periocular leukotrichia, pinnal alopecia, and psychogenic alopecia.

Young Siamese cats are predisposed to histiocytic cutaneous mast cell tumours.

The Siamese is one of the more commonly affected breeds for gangliosidosis 1. An autosomal recessive mutation in the GBL1 gene is responsible for the condition in the breed.

== Breeds derived from the Siamese ==
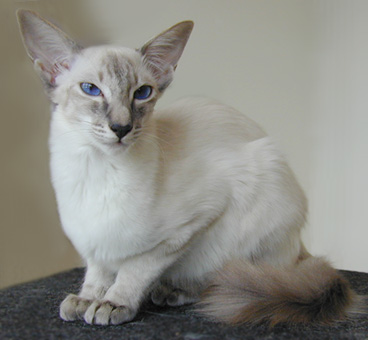
Balinese are also known as Longhaired Siamese, being distinguished by coat length

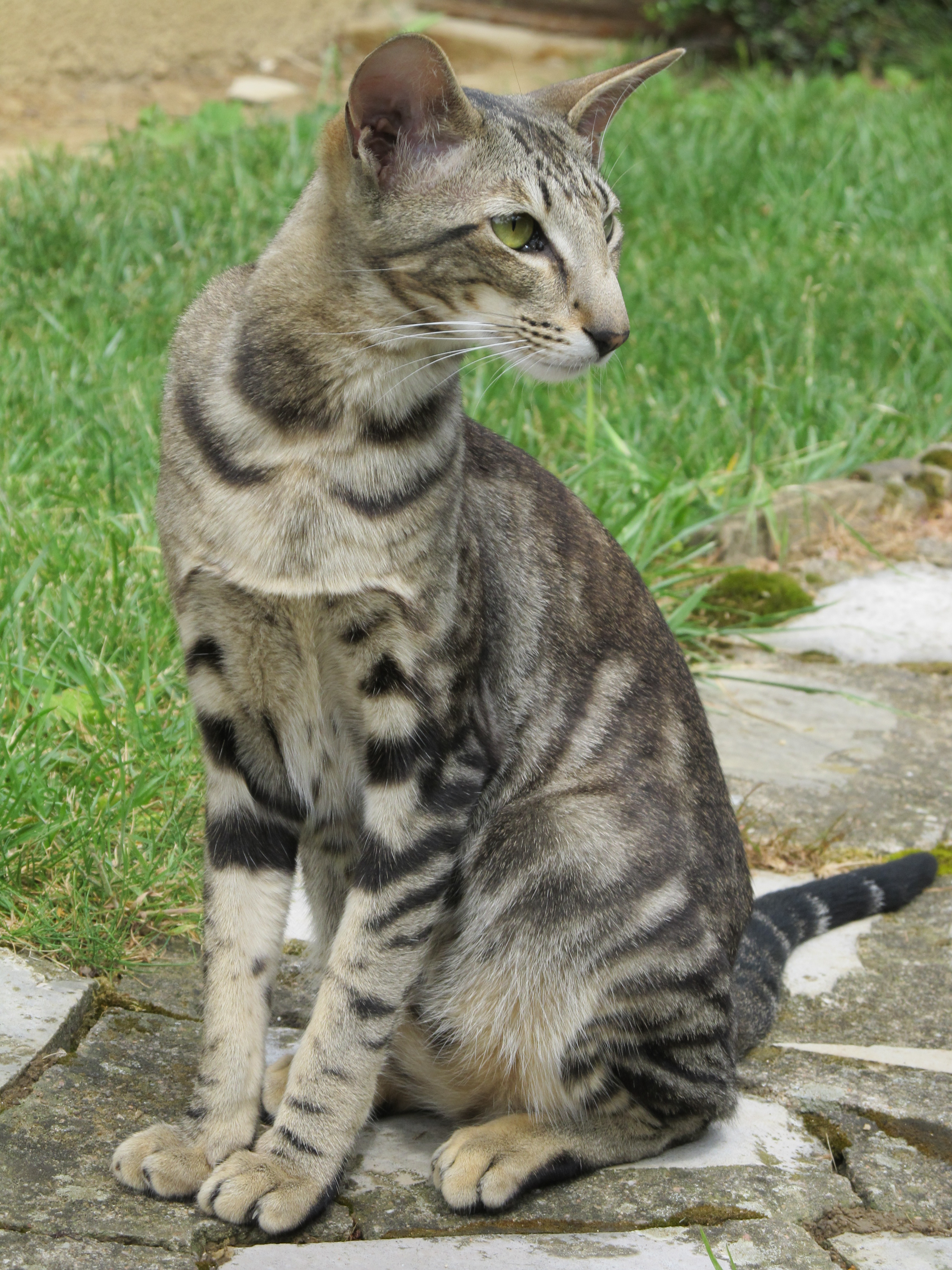
Orientals have the same head and body type, but non-blue eyes and a wide variety of coat patterns

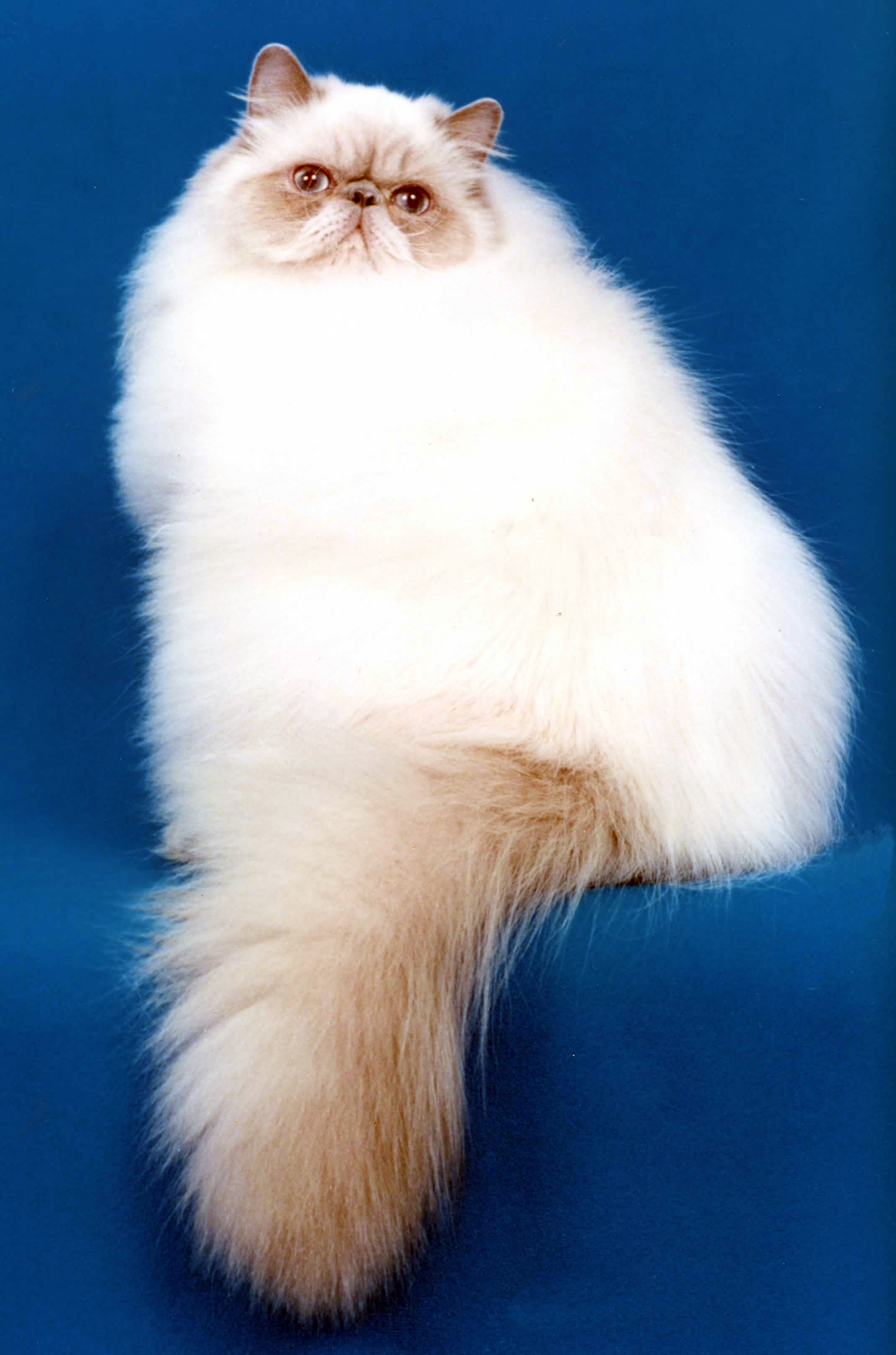
Himalayan, a breed derived from crosses of Persians to Siamese

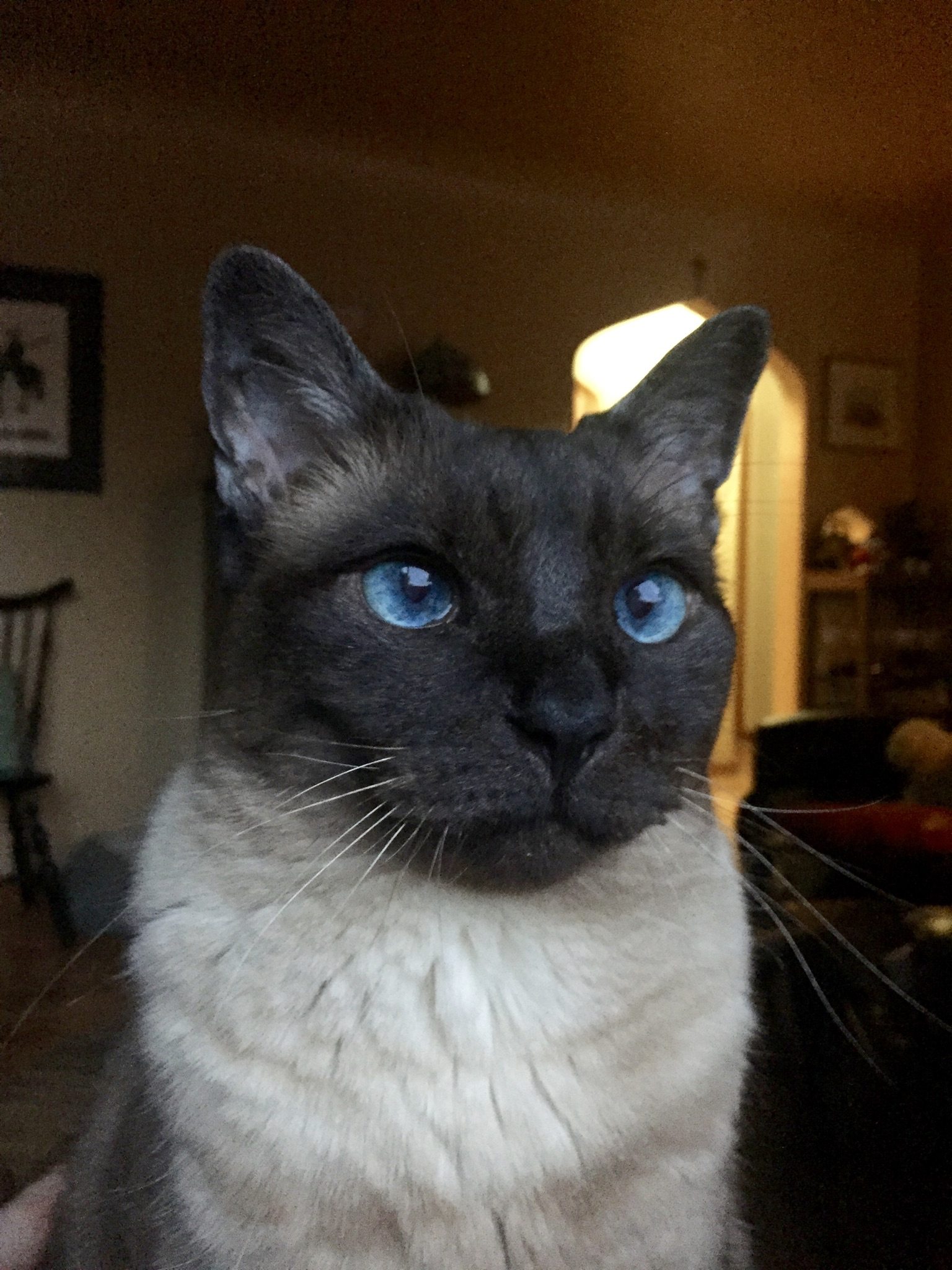
Seal point Domestic Shorthair, a breedless cross between a Siamese and a Domestic Shorthair

- Balinese – natural mutation of the Siamese cat; a longhaired Siamese. In the largest US registry, the CFA is limited to the four traditional Siamese coat colours of seal point, blue point (a dilute of seal point), chocolate point, and lilac point (a dilute of the chocolate point). Other registries in the US and worldwide recognise a greater diversity of colours.
- Birman – after almost all the individuals of the breed died out during the years of World War II, French breeders reconstructed the breed through interbreeding with various other breeds, including the Siamese. Modern Birman cats have inherited their pointed coat patterns from the Siamese.
- Burmese – is a breed of domesticated cats descended from a specific cat, Wong Mau, who was found in Burma in 1930 by Joseph Cheesman Thompson. She was brought to San Francisco, USA, where she was bred with Siamese.
- Havana Brown – resulted from crossing a chocolate-point Siamese with a black cat.
- Colourpoint Shorthair – a Siamese-type cat registered in CFA with pointed coat colours aside from the traditional CFA Siamese coat colours; originally developed by crosses with other shorthair cats. Considered part of the Siamese breed in most cat associations but considered a separate breed in CFA and WCF. Variations can include tabby (US: lynx) points and tortie points.
- Himalayan – longhaired breed originally derived from crosses of Persians to Siamese and pointed domestic longhair cats to introduce the point markings and the colours chocolate and lilac. After these initial crosses were used to introduce the colours, further breed development was performed by crossing these cats to the Persian breed. In Europe, they are referred to as colourpoint Persians. In CFA, they are a colour division of the Persian breed.
- Javanese – in CFA, a longhaired version of the Colourpoint Shorthair (i.e. a "Colourpoint Longhair"). In WCF, "Javanese" is an alias of the Oriental Longhair.
- Neva Masquerade – derived in Russia by naturally or selectively crossing Siberian cats with Siamese cats or related colourpoint cats. It bears the Siamese colourpoint gene, but the original foundation stock is unclear.
- Ocicat – a spotted cat originally produced by a cross between Siamese and Abyssinian.
- Oriental Shorthair – a Siamese-style cat in non-pointed coat patterns and colours, including solid, tabby, silver/smoke, and tortoise-shell.
- Oriental Longhair – a longhaired version of the Oriental Shorthair.
- Ragdoll – selectively bred from "alley cats" foundation stock in the USA. It bears the Siamese colourpoint mutation gene.
- Savannah – a domestic hybrid cat breed. It is a hybridisation between a serval and a domestic cat. (The first was bred with a Siamese)
- Snowshoe – a cream and white breed with blue eyes and some points that were produced through the cross-breeding of the Siamese and bi-coloured American Shorthair in the 1960s.
- Thai Cat – also called the Wichianmat or Old-Style Siamese, the traditional type of Siamese imported from Thailand in the 19th century and still bred in Thailand today; and throughout the first half of the 20th century, the only type of Siamese.
- Tonkinese – originally a cross between a Siamese cat and a Burmese. Tonkinese × Tonkinese matings can produce kittens with a Burmese sepia pattern, a Siamese pointed pattern, or a Tonkinese mink pattern (which is something in between the first two, with less pattern contrast than the Siamese but greater than the Burmese); often with aqua eyes.
- Toybob – cat breed of Russian origin. It bears the Siamese colourpoint mutation gene.
- Mekong Bobtail (Thai Bobtail)

== In media, literature and film ==
Siamese cats have been protagonists in literature and film for adults and children since the 1930s. Clare Turlay Newberry's Babette features a Siamese kitten escaping from a New York apartment in 1937. British publisher Michael Joseph recorded his relationship with his Siamese cat in Charles: The Story of a Friendship (1943). The "Siamese Cat Song" sequence ("We are Siamese if you please") in Walt Disney's Lady and the Tramp (1955), features the cats "Si" and "Am", both titled after the former name of Thailand, where the breed originated. The 1958 film adaptation of Bell, Book and Candle features Kim Novak's Siamese cat "Pyewacket", a witch's familiar.

The Incredible Journey (1961) by Sheila Burnford tells the story of three pets, including the Siamese cat "Tao", as they travel 300 miles (480 km) through the Canadian wilderness searching for their beloved masters. The book was a modest success when first published but became widely known after 1963 when it was loosely adapted into a film of the same name by Walt Disney. Disney also employed the same Siamese in the role of "DC" for its 1965 crime caper That Darn Cat!, with The New York Times commenting "The feline that plays the informant, as the F.B.I. puts it, is superb. [...] This elegant, blue-eyed creature is a paragon of suavity and grace".

== See also ==
- Hae Nang Maew Siamese cat procession in Southeast Asia
- Thai cat a.k.a. Old-style or Traditional Siamese
- Colourpoint Shorthair
- List of cat breeds
