= The Supervet: Noel Fitzpatrick =

Television series

- Genre: Factual
- Directed by: James Incledon (2014); Chris Rowe (2014–15); Phil Broadhurst (2015)
- Narrated by: Sally Phillips; Rebecca Front; Cherie Lunghi; Tamsin Greig; Claire Skinner
- Composers: Chris White (2014); Wayne Roberts (2014–15)
- Country of origin: United Kingdom
- Original language: English

Production
- Executive producers: Edmund Coulthard; Alex Sutherland; Alistair Pegg; Nick Shearman
- Production locations: Fitzpatrick Referrals Ltd, Eashing, Surrey
- Running time: 60 minutes (inc. adverts)
- Production company: Blast! Films

Original release
- Network: Channel 4
- Release: 7 May 2014 – present

Related
- The Bionic Vet

The Supervet: Noel Fitzpatrick (known as The Supervet from 2014 to 2019) is a Channel 4 television series following the work of Irish veterinary surgeon Noel Fitzpatrick and his team at Fitzpatrick Referrals in Eashing, Surrey. The series shows the work of Fitzpatrick and his team, who attempt to cure pets that might otherwise be beyond saving.

One series had the Supervet out 'on the road,' mixing up the traditional format, with visits to various dog shows and other types of pets in the community.

== Episodes ==
Series	Episodes	Originally released	
Series	Episodes	First released	Last released
1	4	7 May 2014	28 May 2014
2	4	15 October 2014	5 November 2014
Christmas Special (2014)	1	15 December 2014	
3	7	5 March 2015	23 April 2015
In the Field (2015)	2	12 August 2015	19 August 2015
4	4	25 November 2015	16 December 2015
5	3	2 February 2016	16 February 2016
Christmas Special (2015)	1	22 December 2015	
6	10	23 March 2016	25 May 2016
Bionic Specials (2016)	4	11 August 2016	1 September 2016
7	4	9 November 2016	30 November 2016
Christmas Special (2016)	1	20 December 2016	
8	4	17 February 2017	16 March 2017
9	11	20 April 2017	29 June 2017
10	8	21 September 2017	23 November 2017
Christmas Special (2017)	1	19 December 2017	
11	6	28 February 2018	4 April 2018
12	7	12 September 2018	24 October 2018
Christmas Special (2018)	1	6 December 2018	
13	6	6 March 2019	10 April 2019
14	5	19 June 2019	17 July 2019
Christmas Special (2019)	1	17 December 2019	
15	5	9 January 2020	6 February 2020
Summer Special	4	2 July 2020	23 July 2020
Christmas Special (2020)	1	27 December 2020	
16	6	27 May 2021	1 July 2021
17	4	21 June 2022	12 August 2022
Safari Special (2023)	1	23 February 2023	
18	4	20 July 2023	10 August 2023

=== Series 1 (2014) ===
No.	Title	Original release date
1	"Scooby, Tiger and Otis"	7 May 2014
Oscar the black cat drops by the clinic for some new footwear. Bacus the French Bulldog with a severe limp is in need of a pair of tights to aid his recovery. Otis the Greyhound was found shot at, collapsed and bleeding in the snow and brought in to the clinic by a charity to see if anything could be done to salvage his broken leg. The team have to work to bring Tiger the ginger cat, with badly injured hind legs caused by a snare trap, back from the brink of death after suffering a cardiac arrest. Black Labrador Scooby has a potentially life-threatening bone tumour.
2	"Rufus, Dixie and Daphne"	14 May 2014
Noel operates on 5-month-old Dutch rabbit Rufus who has a badly broken hind leg. 50-year-old tortoise Toto needs help for his missing hind leg. 7-year-old Cocker Spaniel Dixie needs major spinal surgery, and Noel looks to X-Men's Wolverine for inspiration as he treats Daphne – a rescue crossbreed dog adopted 2 years previously from Thailand, whose front leg was hacked off with a machete. Noel fights the sudden post-surgical infection with Manuka honey. Chihuahua-Pug cross Tyson with strange walk, is being seen by Muscle Specialist Dr. Mike Farrell.
3	"Jasper, Mojo and Lolli"	21 May 2014
13-week-old blue Staffie puppy Jasper arrives at the clinic after his owners notice his forelimbs are growing in the wrong direction. Noel needs to perform surgery quickly if he is to correct Jasper's condition, however things don't go as smoothly as they could. Lolli the black cat has suffered a significant injury to her pelvis after going missing for seven days. Toffee, a very pregnant potbellied pig, has been kicked by a horse causing a broken hind leg. 7-year-old Golden Labrador Mojo presents to the clinic with wobbly, a condition caused by compression of the spinal cord making him unsteady on his feet. His recovery after a very challencing is unbelievable, something Noel has never seen in his career.
4	"Pixie, Tessa and Ellie"	28 May 2014
Pixie, a 12-year-old tabby cat, presents to the clinic after being hit by a car. 12-year-old Retriever Tessa's owners have to make a very tough decision after she is diagnosed with a severe bone tumour in her front leg, and a 9-year-old Great Dane Ellie is in need of one of Noel's pioneering inventions the FITS (Fitz Inter-Vertebral Traction Screw) to help her overcome a severe neck problem. Heartbreakingly, Tessa fails to survive.

=== Series 2 (2014) ===
No.	Title	Original release date
1	"Schrodinger, Lois and Flossie"	15 October 2014
Schrodinger, an 11-year-old blue cat, has been brought into the clinic after shattering his thigh bone following a car accident. Lois, a 21 kg English Bulldog is placed on a 20 % weightloss plan in an attempt to avoid further knee surgery and an elderly Springer Spaniel Flossie is rushed into the clinic after suddenly losing control of her back legs.
2	"Frankie and Emily"	22 October 2014
Willow, a 10-month-old medical alert dog Labrador puppy, has had to put his training on hold while Noel performs a total hip replacement. Noel needs to take inspiration from an ice-cream scoop to help Frankie a mischievous 1-year-old Dachshund puppy with a deformed front foot. Tough decisions need to be made by the owners of Emily, an 8-year-old Shih-Tzu who comes to see Noel due to her bizarre walk.
3	"Lara, Chief & Bertie"	29 October 2014
1-year-old white cat Lara is rushed in with a seriously shattered leg after gone missing for 12 days, having jumped into a van, escaped only to be hit by a car and then attacked by a fox. 7-year-old Northern Inuit, Chief has dislocated his hip when chasing a fox in the garden. Chief's owners cannot afford the cost of a £6000 hip replacement and have to decide whether to put him to sleep. The case highlights the importance of preparing for the unexpected when you own a pet. It is recommended that pet owners insure their animals which can help meet the costs with medical and surgical conditions. This episode also sees Noel operate on colleague, Surgical Resident Susan's 12-year-old rescue Spaniel Bertie with bad knees. Wilson the black Labrador comes to meet Senior Vet Surgeon Mike Farrell, for shock wave therapy for his swollen wrist. Heartbreakingly, Bertie fails to survive.
4	"Ira, Tom and Marley"	5 November 2014
Labrador Ira's owner Joyce notice he was dragging his feet when out walking, and what seemed like a minor problem turned out to need a bionic solution. Noel has to decide whether Surgical Resident Miguel Solano is ready to tackle Marley the blue cat's challenging leg fracture. Tom, an anxious French Bulldog needs treatment to relieve the compression on his spinal cord, but first Noel must find a way to relax both Tom and his owner.

=== Christmas Special (2014) ===
No.	Title	Original release date
1	"Christmas in the Clinic"	15 December 2014
In this Christmas Special we catch-up with some of the pets from the last two series and find out what has happened to Scooby the Labrador cross, Jasper the blue Staffie and Pixie the cat. We are also introduced to Fievel, a 16-month-old Labrador, who needs a total hip replacement on both sides and that is only the beginning as Fievel is set to become Fitzpatrick's longest-term patient.

=== Series 3 (2015) ===
No.	Title	Original release date
1	"Otto, Elvis & Gucci"	5 March 2015
German Shepherd, Otto, has a life threatening bone tumour and Noel hopes that a bionic leg implant will prolong Otto's life long enough to see his owners' wedding day. Elvis, a 9-month-old Rottweiler rescue puppy, is having trouble walking and Noel notices that there something wrong with his spine, probably caused by former abuse. Pomeranian puppy Gucci has broken her paw in her new home requiring Noel to perform delicate surgery on the mischievous puppy.
2	"Stampy, Dylan & Lilly-Belle"	12 March 2015
Cavachon Stampy has been hit by a car and is in a critical conditions. Owners have to decide whether to put their pet through a spinal surgery, or let him go. The owner of Golden Retriever Dylan, has driven seven hours to seek Noel's advice after his pet has developed a limp. Lilly-Belle, a most spoiled Miniature Dachshund from Chelsea, arrives at the clinic after losing the use of her back legs.
3	"Diamond, Sweetie, Hopity & Dandi"	19 March 2015
Christine brings her two Toy Poodles to the clinic as 2-year-old Diamond is in need of a total hip replacement due to a collision at home and 5-year-old rescue Sweetie was born with a deformed knee and a twisted leg. Sweetie gets a total knee replacement with a custom made, hinged and plated titanium implant, first of its kind in the world, in a pioneering 4 hour surgery. A tiny 12-week-old Balinese kitten called Hopity has a deformed back leg that she could end up losing. Dandi, a five-month-old German Shepherd has a deformity in both front legs. Heartbreakingly, Dandi fails to survive.
4	"Loki, Willow & Faberge"	2 April 2015
Former employee Micha brings her 3-year-old Bengal cat, Loki, into the clinic. A hit from a car has resulted in severe damage to both hind legs and pelvis. Noel will only know whether he can save Loki once the operation is underway. Willow, a young rescue Deerhound, has broken her neck after running into a tree. She arrives at Fitzpatrick Referrals in the middle of the night, paralysed and in severe pain. It is the worst break Noel has seen. Unfortunately, Noel has already been operating for 11 hours; he is exhausted, sleep deprived and unsure whether he can perform the necessary procedure. Faberge, a 13-year-old rescue Chinese crested dog with seizures, is brought in for investigations to Chief Neurologist Clare Rusbrigde.
5	"Speedy, Snoopy & Winston"	9 April 2015
Noel is faced with the smallest bone he has ever operated on when baby rabbit Speedy breaks his leg after a fight with his female companion. An emergency arrives in the form of the 8-month-old Winston, English Bulldog puppy who has a mysterious paralysis. 10-month-old Jack Russell Terrier-Cavalier King Charles Spaniel cross Snoopy has been run over by a van and Noel cannot save his paw. Can Noel give Snoopy a bionic paw instead? Heartbreakingly, Winston fails to survive.
6	"Dolly, Anya & Lola"	16 April 2015
Dolly, a rescue 4-year-old Bulldog, is having trouble with all four of her legs and is in need of multiple surgeries. To make matters worse a cancerous lump is discovered. 4-year-old German Shepherd Police dog Anya has damaged her spine and must be returned to her full working capacity otherwise she will need to be put down. 9-year-old Lola, an adopted ex-race dog Greyhound has a mystery problem with her feet. Noel uses a 'state-of-the-art' diagnostic tool – his toothbrush – to help him find the answer.
7	"Cyrus, Ghost, Bella & Bucklesbury Bear"	23 April 2015
Cyrus, an Alapaha Blue Blood Bulldog, is having trouble with all four legs presenting a moral dilemma for his owners. Bucklesbury Bear, a huge Newfoundland, finds a new lease of life in the hydrotherapy pool after undergoing a leg amputation to remove an Osteosarcoma. 7-month-old Husky-German Shepherd cross puppy Ghost is lame on his front legs and need Noel to find out why. Chief Neurologist Clare Rusbridge sees Bella, a Maltese Terrier-Bichon Frise cross, who is in great distress, unable to stand and hyperventilating as a result of a serious brain disease.

=== In the Field (2015) ===
No.	Title	Original release date
1	"Supervet in the Field – Part 1"	12 August 2015
Over 10,000 owners and their dogs join at Loseley Park, Surrey, one of the biggest events of the doggie calendar. There is all manner of eccentric festival madness from speed puppy training to a 'Guess the Weight of your Dog' stall but we also follow two new Supervet stories from diagnosis, through surgery and recovery before they make an appearance at the festival. Sox a Great Dane has a serious spinal problem. His life hangs in the balance unless Noel can come up with a solution for him and his loving family. 4-month-old Labrador Obi needs shoulder surgery to enable him to continue to be a companion and support to his young friend and family member 6-year-old Luke – who has Asperger's Syndrome.
1	"Supervet in the Field – Part 2"	19 August 2015
Professor Noel Fitzpatrick has redefined veterinary practice with pioneering prosthetic limb replacements. This week over 6,500 families and their dogs join him in Cheshire, for a massive celebration of the shared love they have for their dogs. They gather to take part in an extraordinary agility display by dogs with prosthetic limb replacements, and we follow two new Supervet patients from diagnosis, through surgery and recovery and find out whether they can make an appearance at the festival. Jake is a street dog form Greece who was brought back to the UK after his leg was badly damaged in a traffic accident. But his leg is in a very bad way forcing Noel to attempt one of the most challenging limb replacements of his career. Dupe, a South African Mastiff puppy, who is facing a life threatening spinal condition requiring surgery to save him from paralysis.

=== Series 4 (2015) ===
No.	Title	Original release date
1	"Spud, Maya & Maxi"	25 November 2015
1-year-old stoic Russian Blue cat Maya has a shattered jaw from a dog attack, and lets Noel to treat her wounds like no other cat. 2-year-old black Labrador cross Spud with a painful leg is the closest companion of Chris who has spent most of his life living on the streets. 6-month-old Chihuahua puppy Maxie is Jackie's pride and joy. Noel straightens a complicated fracture deformity in his little wrist which is causing Maxie challenges walking. Heartbreakingly, Spud fails to survive.
2	"Bodie, Buggy & Icicle"	2 December 2015
The tables are turned for Fitzpatricks Nurse Steph when her black and white cat Icicle is rushed into Fitzpatricks after being poisoned. Senior Neurologist Dr. Colin Driver comes up with an unconventional solution that he has only read about in textbooks to reverse the effects of the poison. Polish Lowland Sheepdog Bodie has a failed fracture repair and Noel has only one shot at saving the leg. Feisty ginger tomcat Buggy needs corrective surgery for his deformed back legs.
3	"Bruno, Gandalph & Rosie"	9 December 2015
Noel and his team have to deal with two emergency cases, Bruno is a Staffordshire Bull Terrier who works as a therapy dog. Surgical Resident Dr. Pádraig Egan helps Gandalph, a Devon Rex cat who has been struck by a car. 4-year-old Cavalier King Charles Spaniel Rosie has had seven previous operations to try to fix her knee joint. Rosie's knee keeps popping out of place and slipping down – in order to get her out of pain Noel will need to place a new titanium groove in the knee. Heartbreakingly, Gandalph fails to survive.
4	"Ice, Jin Jin & Ted"	16 December 2015
8-month-old white Alsatian puppy Ice needs traditional surgery on his hips and front leg, but Noel hopes that a new kind of biological treatment will help repair his elbow. Jin Jin, a young longhair Chihuahua has paralysis in his back legs, caused by a deformity in his neck which is compressing the spinal cord. Fiercely protective of his mum, anyone else who comes near him gets short shrift – including Noel! 18-month-old rescue stray Scotty cross Ted has deformed front legs and needs surgery with extensive hydrotherapy – no small thing for a dog who is scared of wet grass!

=== Christmas Special (2015) ===
No.	Title	Original release date
1	"The Supervet at Christmas: Adam, Harvey & Peggy"	22 December 2015
2-year-old sleigh-pulling Alaskan Malamute Adam with bad knees needs replacements on both knees. Miniature Dachshund puppy, 6-week-old Peggy gets physiotherapy for her deformed front leg and becomes officially the smallest dog ever to use the hydrotherapy tank. 4-year-old black Cocker Spaniel Harvey has mysteriously shattered his jaw severely in the garden. Noel also gets a surprise visitor from back home in Ireland, his mum Rita Fitzpatrick.

=== Series 5 (2016) ===
No.	Title	Original release date
1	"Henry, Geoffrey & MK"	2 February 2016
18-week-old Cockapoo puppy Henry is rushed into Fitzpatrick Referrals with a fractured neck after a freak garden accident where he collided with a flower-pot. Noel performs the kind of spinal surgery he has never done before and has to improvise — doing the strangest thing he has done as a surgeon. A 2-year-old black and white rescue cat MK, has fallen from a window 18 months ago. MK's owner vet Lizzie has already tried fixing MK's leg herself, but the operation hasn't worked and she's worried he may need a knee-replacement. 3-year-old Romanian crossbreed stray dog Geoffrey was found abandoned and emaciated before being adopted. His front legs are so badly deformed that he's in constant pain and barely able to walk.
2	"Ollie, Star & Zak"	9 February 2016
5-year-old Great Dane Star is rushed to Fitzpatrick Referrals after losing the use of her back legs. A slipped disk in her spinal column proves treatable, but three months later complications leave Star fighting for her life with the help of Senior Neurologists Colin Driver. One and a half-year old Cavalier King Charles Spaniel Ollie is brought in with a broken leg, after being hit by a car. 8-year-old Collie Zak is brought to Fitzpatrick Referrals all the way from Yorkshire. Medication has allowed Zak to live with hip dysplasia his whole life, but in recent months things have taken a turn for the worse.
3	"Barney, Miranda & Billy"	16 February 2016
Billy the 6-year-old rescue Newfoundland is travelling back and forth 650 miles from his home in Aberdeen for treatment. His owners have known from day one nine months ago, that something was wrong with Billy's legs but when scans reveal significant damage in multiple joints. Tiny Yorkshire Terrier Barney is just ten months old, but he has a deformity in his neck which is compressing his spinal cord, leaving him unable even to stand. Noel finds himself managing the needs of both Kelly and her pampered-pooch Chihuahua Miranda, as Kelly decides whether or not to carry on with the surgeries needed to correct Miranda's slipping knee caps. Heartbreakingly, Barney fails to survive.

=== Series 6 (2016) ===
No.	Title	Original release date
1	"Mr Mac, Jersey & Reggie"	23 March 2016
2-metre tall Great Dane, Mr Mac has begun to wobble when he stands, and there may be a problem with the nerves in his huge neck. He has a condition called Wobbler disease Syndrome. Noel offers a unique custom-designed spinal implant system in an attempt to give him back his quality of life. 2-year-old three-legged ginger cat Jersey has recently become lame on his single back leg. Noel has to decide if he can take the risk of performing his first-ever hip replacement on a three-legged cat. 3-year-old 65 kilo Dogue De Bordeaux Reggie has elbow dysplasia. If left untreated he'll be in constant pain when he walks. However, the results of the arthroscopy come as a welcome surprise.
2	"Orla, Scooby & Kane"	30 March 2016
Natalie arrives in an Animal Ambulance with 2-year-old Cockapoo Orla who ran off during a walk, and was hit by an industrial lawn mower leaving her leg badly damaged. Traumatised Natalie tells Noel she collected up what she could of the pieces of Orla's leg that were mangled in the mower, and has brought them with her. The following surgery is among the top three most challenging, that Noel Fitzpatrick has done. Rescue German Shepherd/Collie cross Kane has a bulging disk in his spine and a hip dysplasia and, is only managing to walk a short distance. Sam has a special bond with 7-year-old black Labrador Scooby. She has a rare brain condition and Scooby has been her comforter and best friend. Scooby has been struggling with pain in his elbows, and Sam has now exhausted all non-surgical options.
3	"Hetty, Louis & Bliss"	6 April 2016
5-year-old black Labrador Hetty is believed to be the first dog to have been trained both as a guide dog for the blind and a seizure alert dog. She helps blind Toni live an active life, and also warns Toni if she is about to have an epileptic seizure. Hetty has become lame on both her front legs. Invasive surgery could mean Hetty will be out of action for as long as four months, a terrifying thought for Toni. Louis, a 7-year old Rhodesian Ridgeback has a cancerous tumour in his back leg, spreading very fast. Louis is brought to Noel to see if surgery can save his leg, and prolong his life. Fitzpatrick Referrals receptionist Natalie finds herself on the other side of the counter when she fears her Tibetan Terrier Bliss has a rare neurological condition after she developed worrying symptoms and a lack of energy. She brings Bliss to Chief of Neurology, Dr. Clare Rusbridge.
4	"Darcy, Archie & Banjo"	13 April 2016
18-month-old Chihuahua Darcy is rushed in after being hit by a car. For her 18-year-old owner TaJournée, Darcy is a lifeline helping her cope with her autism. 7-year-old overweight Cavalier King Charles Spaniel Banjo has in recent months become less and less mobile. He's brought in for a relatively simple total hip replacement. 5-year-old Springer Spaniel Prison sniffer dog Archie is brought in to see Noel after showing lameness at work. Noel is keen to perform the least invasive procedure possible to help him back to work as soon as possible. But key-hole investigations throw up an unexpected complication in both shoulders, throwing doubt over Archie's career.
5	"Tess, Bradley & Poppie"	20 April 2016
1-year-old Saint Bernard puppy Poppie has hip dysplasia. Having recently lost Poppie's brother Samson to a similar illness, emotions run high and the pressure is on for Noel to save Poppie from a similar fate … An accident four years ago has left a black & white cat Bradley with a badly deformed hind foot that makes it almost impossible for the cat to walk on. 13-year-old Collie Tess, is rushed in after being hit by a car. Her leg is badly fractured and risk of infection is a major concern for Resident Surgeon Dr. Pádraig Egan as he battles to save her leg.
6	"Dexter, Blu & Coco"	27 April 2016
4-year-old chinchilla Dexter, has a broken leg, after her owner's dad accidentally stepped on him. Dexter's tiny airways and bones make the operation anything but simple. 4-month-old Rhodesian Ridgeback Shar Pei mix puppy Coco is rushed to the practice after being hit by a van. Her leg is so badly broken, that her owner is worried she may lose the leg. Running out of options, Noel is forced to improvise with Manuka honey and a homemade splint. Black Labrador Blu has been to Fitzpatrick's for treatment for a number of different ailments, including cancer. Now he's back at the practice after a problem is noticed with his back legs. When scans show the cause is not one, but two bulging discs, it's a crushing blow.
7	"Molly, Archie & Lily"	4 May 2016
8-year-old Cocker Spaniel Archie is brought in as an emergency referral with a cancerous tumour on his front paw. Noel can offer Archie a bionic paw, one of Fitzpatrick Referrals' unique treatments. 2-year-old black & white cat Lily was badly hurt in a car accident 18 months ago. Lily had a seizure under previous surgery and her back leg now permanently drags on the ground as she walks. Tina and her boisterous sons bring in their 8-month-old Springer Spaniel puppy, Molly. One of Molly's hind legs is badly deformed with the kneecap totally out of alignment and both the thigh and shin bones badly twisted. This will require complicated surgery to realign the leg, and rebuild her knee with a new titanium groove.
8	"Pearl, Casey & Black Beauty"	11 May 2016
Karen has nocturnal epileptic seizures. 8-year-old Staffordshire Bull Terrier medical alert dog Pearl has the ability to sense when these episodes are about to happen, and wakes Karen's carer giving a critical few minutes warning. Pearl has problems with knees and is unable to walk without pain. Pearl's post-op recovery is far from straightforward and Karen relocates from her home to a B&B near the practice. Two-and a half-year old Irish Setter Casey is brought in after diagnosed with a cancerous tumour in front leg. With bone cancer it is unlikely Casey will live beyond a year. Noel goes ahead with the surgery, and a post-op biopsy reveals some surprising results. Cat Black Beauty is rushed in after being hit by a car. Veterinary Resident James, examines Black Beauty and finds he has extensive fractures to his jaw. With Noel they wire his jaw back together, but will Black Beauty's family ever be able to persuade him to eat properly again?
9	"Cookie, Stouffie & Co-pee"	18 May 2016
Cookie, a Cocker Spaniel has been partially paralysed on her back legs since birth. She has been given treatment by the specialist team at Fitzpatrick Referrals before. Cookie manages to get around, but her feet are prone to infection as she has no feeling in them and they scuff on the floor when she walks. She is brought in to see if Noel can fix her problem by fitting two bionic back feet. However when Noel scans Cookie further serious complications are revealed. Paul lives with Stouffie, his 8-year-old Maine Coon cat. Two weeks ago, Paul noticed Stouffie limping and within a week he had started to drag his leg. Noel launches a series of investigations into what is causing the problem. The results reveal a serious problem, and Paul faces a difficult decision. Westie puppy Co-Pee comes in after having fractured a knee in an accident at home. The surgery is tricky as Co-Pee is only 5 months old and hasn't finished growing. Pauline is determined to give him the best chance of healing, which involves keeping Co-Pee calm and preventing him from running about, but with a Westie pup that's easier said than done. Heartbreakingly, Stouffie fails to survive.
10	"Olaf, Rhett & Willow"	25 May 2016
Noel pushes the boundaries of his lifesaving medicine on a 10-month-old Golden Retriever Olaf. He helps 5-year-old Alice by reducing her anxiety which predisposes her epilepsy, but lameness has made him unable to complete his necessary training for epilepsy detection. Noel uses ground-breaking cell treatment – extracting stem cells from Olaf's bone marrow then re-injecting them into the joint to help repair the damaged joint. 2-year-old Maine Coon cat Rhett has come to see Noel following a suspected rat bite. A course of antibiotics hasn't worked and the lump is getting bigger. Noel and his team have to play detective to discover what turns out to be a condition that Noel has never seen before. 4-month-old Whippet puppy Willow is rushed in after being hit by a car, leaving her with multiple pelvic fractures. Noel has to perform intricate reconstructive surgery with pinpoint accuracy on her young and delicate bones.

=== Bionic Specials (2016) ===
No.	Title	Original release date
1	"Molly & Archie"	11 August 2016
Professor Noel Fitzpatrick harnesses two extraordinary technologies; 3D Printing and 3D milling to save the life of a 9-year-old Cavalier King Charles Spaniel Molly with a rapidly growing brain tumour, and to replace the deformed elbow of a 4-year-old Norfolk Terrier Archie. Both surgeries are totally new for Noel and among the most challenging in his career.
2	"Flo & Izzy"	18 August 2016
7-month-old Italian Spinone Flo has a hole in her shoulder joint and is in significant pain. Noel offers a custom made implant to exactly fill the hole, which will then be packed full of cells harvested from Flo's own tissue to encourage the implant to fully integrate with the bone, and to create a new cartilage joint surface. It's a revolutionary technique that Noel is the first ever person to attempt in a clinical patient. 7-year-old Border Collie Izzy has a broken front leg, having been hit by a car five months ago. The initial fracture repair failed, got infected, has loose implants with dead bone, and now a large gap where the bone has wasted away. Noel proposes a new treatment that has never been tried before; replacing the big defect in the bone with a titanium scaffold injected with stem cells, which he hopes will grow into new bone. It's a high risk operation but Izzy is in constant pain with very limited options apart from amputation. If Noel succeeds, it could change the future of veterinary and even human surgery.
3	"Peanut & Ard-Ri"	25 August 2016
1-year-old black and white cat Peanut was born with deformed front legs, leaving him with infections and sores as he struggles to walk. Noel is the only vet in the world to offer animals prosthetic limbs with a PerFiTS implant designed such that the bone and skin can grow into the metal, which becomes part of the skeleton. If he succeeds with Peanut, it's believed this will be the first ever animal in the world with such double front limb prostheses. Massive 76 kg Irish Wolfhound Ard-Ri was diagnosed with bone cancer in his leg. Noel is the only surgeon in the world offering endoprosthesis implant which attaches to multiple bones in the forearm and into which bone can grow so that it becomes a permanent part of the skeleton.
4	"Lulu & Maori"	1 September 2016
Noel helps Rottweiler Lulu and Doberman Maori who is are both struggling to walk and in pain. Designing his own patient specific implants for each animal, Noel is taking veterinary spinal surgery to a whole new level.

=== Series 7 (2016) ===
No.	Title	Original release date
1	"Murphy, Mack & Frynse"	9 November 2016
3-month-old Golden Retriever puppy Murphy is rushed in by his family. A severe dog attack has left Murphy with horrific facial injuries. His jaw bone is hanging off and his life hangs in the balance. 6-month-old Hungarian Vizsla puppy Mack has a bone and cartilage disorder. When scans reveal deep holes and rupture of his cruciate ligaments in both knee joints, Noel attempts a technique he has never tried before. Jorgen has driven all the way from Switzerland to Fitzpatrick Referrals in the hope of a successful treatment for his best friend, 10-year-old Chihuahua Frynse. Frynse has been lame for some time, but when Noel and his team examine him they find another problem which comes as a crushing blow to Jorgen. Heartbreakingly, Frynse fails to survive
2	"Rex, Amie & Piggy"	16 November 2016
4-month-old blue Staffordshire Bull Terrier puppy Rex is brought with a badly deformed elbow from birth. Noel carries out a complicated procedure to realign the bones in his elbow to get him out of pain and improve his ability to walk. It's a complex task and the road to recovery is long. Amie, a 1-year-old black stray rescue cat, was found with a badly broken and deformed front leg. Due to the lack of blood supply in Amie's paw after surgery, Noel has to pull out all the stops to save her leg, including combining cutting edge medical techniques with an age old treatment – leeches! 10-year-old Staffie-Labrador cross Piggy has a history of lameness in her back legs plus a suspected spinal problem. After three years of pain management, the owners want to see if there is anything that Noel can do for her. Heartbreakingly, Piggy fails to survive.
3	"Buzzard, Charlie & Baros"	23 November 2016
A wild buzzard with a broken wing throws up new challenges for Noel. The delicate hollow bones in the bird's wing make fixing it with a conventional splint far from straightforward. It leaves Noel with limited options, as he strives to save the bird's life – and give him back his freedom. Rose's pampered Maine Coon kitten Baros is used to enjoying the finer things in a cat's life. And when Noel diagnoses slipping knee caps, Rose naturally wants the best for him. But when Baros is admitted for surgery Rose finds parting with her beloved pet harder than she imagined. Black Labrador Charlie is brought with badly damaged elbow joints. Noel has to perform invasive surgery but weeks after his first operation Charlie is rushed in with a complication that comes as a devastating blow.
4	"Wobble, Tia & Alfie"	30 November 2016
Wobble the Whippet was rescued by the RSPCA, after it is believed she was badly beaten on the back. Her spine is so badly damaged that, if left untreated, she is at risk of permanent paralysis. Noel performs a high risk operation; if he succeeds, Wobble has the chance of a pain free life. If he fails, Wobble's future is uncertain. A Bengal cat Tia is rushed to Fitzpatrick Referrals after being hit by a car which has left her pelvis shattered and her back leg paralysed. Chocolate Labrador Alfie wasn't meant to be a care dog. But ever since owner Sara became ill with Lupus, he has become her lifeline. When Noel diagnoses Alfie with elbow dysplasia, its Sara's turn to return the favour by caring for Alfie, but it won't be a straightforward solution.

=== Christmas Special (2016) ===
No.	Title	Original release date
1	"The Supervets at Christmas: Maxi, River & Keira"	20 December 2016
Professor Noel Fitpatrick treats Maxi, a 3-year-old rescue Greyhound with a severely broken front legs, his elbows are the worst Noel has ever seen. 4-month-old Border Terrier puppy River has fractured his back knees, when falling from a sofa. Noel himself has broken his own ankle and performs River's second surgery from a wheelchair. Noel discovers just how upsetting it is to be faced with a poorly pet when his own dog 8-year-old Border Terrier Keira is rushed into the practice with sickness and diarrhoea. Noel pays a surprise Christmas visit to her mum Rita in Ireland.

=== Series 8 (2017) ===
No.	Title	Original release date
1	"Rodney, Nell & Rollo"	16 February 2017
Noel pulls out all the stops to give a 4-month-old rescue West Highland Terrier puppy Rodney a new lease of life. Rodney was born without back feet and with only a thin layer of skin around the stumps he is at constant risk of infection. Foster mum Kelly hopes two bionic feet will give Rodney the chance at a normal life on four paws. Nell, a young Husky-Collie cross is brought in with a badly damaged pelvis after being hit by a car. Nell is in chronic pain and needs a total hip replacement. Lazy 20-month-old Dachshund Rollo, has deformed front legs. He needs double surgery along with extensive physiotherapy; but trying to motivate Rollo to do exercise proves a challenge!
2	"Twiglet, Maya & Sweeney"	23 February 2017
4-month-old Cockapoo puppy Maya is rushed in after being hit by a car. Her leg is badly damaged leaving much of the skin dead, so Noel has to embark on a series of operations including a skin graft, performed by soft tissue specialist Senior Clinician Dr. Laurent Findji, where her leg is sewn into her stomach in an attempt to grow new skin around the wound. Rescue Chihuahua Twiglet, fell down the stairs while chasing the cat. A failed operation has left her with withered bones and metal pins in her tiny paw. With limited options, Noel attempts a combination of procedures, he has never carried out before. Sweeney, a 5-year-old Great Dane with a big personality is brought in after being diagnosed with a cancerous tumour in his leg. His owner is hoping Noel can perform a unique procedure; replacing bone with metal implant to avoid amputation and restore full function. Heartbreakingly, Sweeney fails to survive.
3	"Lola, Mikka & Dali"	2 March 2017
7-year-old Golden Retriever Mikka has a tumour in her left leg. The owners turn to Noel in the hope he can offer an alternative to amputation. 18-month-old French Bulldog rescue puppy Lola with twisted elbows is brought in. Her legs are so twisted that she needs a custom doggy wheelchair. Previous elbow surgery a year ago has not helped. Her condition is one of the worst Noel has ever seen and with muscles and nerves wrapped around the bone causing further problems. Noel opened his Oncology & Soft Tissue Hospital in Guildford in 2016 offering a range of treatments for pets with oncologic and soft tissue problems – from skin grafts to tumour removal. 12-year-old Field Spaniel-Collie cross Dali, is brought in to see Senior Oncology Consultant Professor Nick Bacon, after he developed a large growth inside his jaw causing the muscle to waste away. Removing the tumour involves highly invasive surgery and cutting away part of Dali's jaw.
4	"Elmer, Shiraz & Rosie"	16 March 2017
Black 5-year-old Labrador Shiraz is rushed to Fitzpatrick Referrals after being hit by a car whilst on a walk with her owner. Her leg has an open fracture contaminated by road dirt and is so badly damaged, that she may lose the leg. 2-year-old Cocker Spaniel Rosie has been limping on her left hind leg. She growls in excruciating pain when her back hips are touched. Scans reveal a bulging disc in her spine as well as nerve damage. 2-year-old Basset Hound Elmer's legs bend out and he struggles to walk normally. Elmer loves sausages, needs to go on a diet and have corrective surgery on his front legs.

=== Series 9 (2017) ===
No.	Title	Original release date
1	"Hector, Mitzi & Zola"	20 April 2017
17-month-old Labradoodle Mitzi is rushed in after being hit by a car, having run out into the road. Noel is concerned with her severe and complex pelvic fractures, as she could have nerve damage. 10-month-old German Pointer Hector has been struggling to walk, he must undergo complex spinal surgery or face the prospect of being put to sleep. 4-year-old Leonberger, Zola has been diagnosed with an aggressive cancer, osteosarcoma, in her front leg. Heartbreakingly, Zola fails to survive.
2	"Marley, Tilly & Monti"	27 April 2017
4-year-old Canicross Champion rescue German Shepherd Marley is admitted to Fitzpatricks after being diagnosed with severe dysplasia of the elbow. Having been abandonent in a boarding kennel for seven months by his former owners, now Marley trusts only his present owner, and that causes him a lot fear and distrust at the practise. The only person who can handle him, is the American intern Mike. 6-year-old Rhodesian Ridgeback Tilly has a high-risk operation to relieve the pressure on the nerves in her spine. Noel treats an old gym buddy's dog, 4-month-old Cockapoo puppy Monti, who escaped from wife's arms and fell to the floor, fracturing his leg.
3	"Bella, Hedgehogs & Gizmo"	4 May 2017
Bella the 7-year-old Boxer has extensive injuries to her pelvis and hind legs from a road accident a year ago. Now her right hind thigh bone is wasting away under the metal plates and screws. Noel considers a pioneering stem-cell procedure with custom made titanium scaffolding with significant risks attached. Bella is able to use her leg 16 days after the surgery and the new bone grows back well. Sadly Noel is faced with one of the worst outcome in his career. Also, a convoy of four young hedgehogs arrive all with a broken left hind leg. Gizmo the black 14-week-old male kitten is brought in with a broken leg after an accident at home. Heartbreakingly, Bella and a hedgehog fail to survive.
4	"Cookie, Guinness & Max"	11 May 2017
4-year-old rescue Papillon dog Cookie needs a double knee replacement, smallest implants Noel has ever operated, and comes to see Noel with all her 13 rescue dog friends. The only person who Cookie trusts, is the American intern Mike. 14-month-old Bernese Mountain Dog Guinness has lost the control of his hind legs and is rushed in with an exploded disc in his spine. 2-year-old rescue German Shepherd Max undergoes a surgery to give him a specially designed bionic left hind foot, for the paw he lost in an accident as a 4-month-old puppy in Romania. Noel has already operated on his right hind leg a year ago.
5	"Marley, Kaspar & Rex"	18 May 2017
3-year-old Border Collie Kaspar comes from France. He has been showing signs of pain in his legs all his life, but no one of the seven vets has been able to pinpoint the problem until now. 8-year-old Pug, Marley has had medical issues throughout his life and now severe pain in his deformed elbow is making it difficult for him to walk. The custom elbow replacement implants Noel is using, are the smallest in the world. Rex 'The Ninja Bolt', a 6-month-old silver Egyptian Mau cat is rushed in after falling from a second story balcony and fracturing his knee in several pieces.
6	"Wilson, Teddy & Sera"	25 May 2017
3-year-old Newfoundland 70 kgs Wilson needs surgery on his severely deformed, bent front legs. Previous surgeries have not worked and have caused him infections. 1-year-old longhaired rescue Chihuahua puppy Teddy has had hip pain since he was five months old, and requires a total hip replacement. 3-year-old black German Shepherd Sera, is to become an assistance dog but a degenerative spinal disease, common with this breed, has been causing her severe pain the last seven months and made her unable to continue with her training. No other previous treatment has worked so far.
7	"Clyde, Rocco & Mario"	1 June 2017
An owner travels through the night to get his 5-year-old Doberman Clyde seen by Professor Noel. He has had progressively worsening problems with walking the past 18 months. 4-year-old Cocker Spaniel Rocco, is rushed in after being hit by a car. 3-year-old lionhead rabbit, Mario, is brought in with a broken left hind ankle. The injury is exactly the same Noel himself has had the previous year.
8	"Bear, Lexi & Henry"	8 June 2017
Professor Noel helps a 2-year-old Bichon Frise Lexi with chronic elbow pain. She has had a number of surgeries to correct the fact her elbow never fitted together properly but each of the surgeries has failed. As Lexi struggles to walk, her owner has resorted to taking her out in a pushchair. The surgery is one of the most difficult Noel has ever done. And there is even more to come ... 6-year-old golden Labrador Henry is unable to stand, after an incident in the park the same day. 62 kilo 3-year-old Leonberger Bear has a bone tumour removed from her leg after being diagnosed with cancer.
9	"Teddy, Ollie & Chica"	15 June 2017
2-year-old Shih-Tzu-Lhasa Apso cross Teddy with dramatically deformed, bent front legs is brought in to see Professor Noel Fitzpatrick. 5-year-old Golden Retriever Ollie has a tumour in the ankle joint of his hind leg. He will be getting a new bionic foot. is 4-month-old Bulldog puppy Chica has fractured her front leg after falling from the arms of her new owner. The fracture is in her elbow in the bone's growth plate, causing a trouble as Chica is still growing. Resident Surgeon Dr. Págraig Egan sees Chica and operates her with Professor Noel.
10	"Clifford, Marley & Nala"	22 June 2017
A dog owner travels from Romania for her 7-year-old rescue dog Clifford. The past year and a half he has been in constant pain, despite the pain medication. The 3D CT scan reveals a spinal cord squashed with vertebrae bone overgrowth. 4-year-old golden Labrador Marley has had a rare shoulder dysplasia since he was a six-month-old puppy. Noel operates a shoulder joint implant, a pioneering and totally new technology. 22-week-old Pug puppy Nala ran into a plant pot and fractured four of her toes a month ago. Now two toes and the main stopper bad are lost due to the restricting bandage causing an infection. Soft tissue specialist Senior Clinician Dr. Laurent Findji thinks reconstructive surgery is possible.
11	"Poppy, Berlioz & Dylan"	29 June 2017
3-month-old rescue Spaniel puppy Poppy's front legs are so severely deformed she has never been able to stand up. She was found abandoned in a garden, probably due to her abnormal legs. 1-year-old blue rescue cat Berlioz has had severe fractures to his jaw and face, after being hit by a car. 4-year-old rescue Lurcher Dylan is unable to walk due to an incredibly painful ankle joint and comes to see Senior Clinician Miguel Solano.

=== Series 10 (2017) ===
No.	Title	Original release date
1	"Lulu, Florence & Muffin"	21 September 2017
2-year-old Staffordshire Bull Terrier Lulu is rushed in late at night after hit by a car travelling at 40mph, when she was chasing a fox. The huge impact has shattered her pelvis into over 25 pieces. Healing will take a long time. 7-year-old Giant Schnauzer Florence lives in Portugal. Due to an accident, whilst chasing a neighbour's German Shepherd a few years ago, Florence has a painful knee which has not improved, despite a number of treatments in Portugal. 5-year-old pointy eared Jack Russell Terrier Muffin arrives at Fitzpatrick's after her family fears she has fallen from their six foot verandah. Unable to move her back legs, Chief Neurologist Dr. Clare Rusbridge is concerned she has developed a serious spinal injury. After examination it's clear she needs emergency surgery, but Clare suspects a fall is not the cause of Muffin's paralysis.
2	"Barney, Tank & Mouse"	28 September 2017
18-month-old mischievous Basset Hound, 29 kg Barney has lately been suffering from weakness in his back legs. He comes to see Head of Neurology, Dr. Clare Rusbridge. He needs to lose weight and a high-risk surgery on his troubled deformed neck vertebrae. 9-month-old giant puppy Mastiff, 53 kg Tank is brought in to see Dr. Noel. He's struggling to walk on both front legs. Tank has severe arthritis and needs radical surgery on both elbows. But he also has problems with slipping knee caps. Noel operates the left elbow with the biggest metal plate he has ever used. 4-month-old Mouse the Miniature Pincher comes to see Surgical Resident Dr. Pádraig Egan. This family puppy has fractured the toes in his front leg after jumping off a bed.
3	"Buzz, Charlie & Pebbles"	5 October 2017
5-year-old Border Collie Buzz arrives with a lump on his ankle. Noel can see Buzz is in a lot of pain, but after doing a series of scans he discovers he has severe arthritis causing new bone growth. Buzz's recovery, however, is not straight forward ... Cheeky Charlie, a 2-year-old silver tabby British Shorthair cat arrives after jumping off the sofa and injuring his hip. He needs a total hip replacement, which are uncommon in cats and a knee surgery. 7-year-old golden Labrador Pebbles is rushed into the Fitzpatrick Referrals Oncology and Soft Tissue centre in Guildford, after a lump is noticed growing on her side. Pebbles has been behaving strangely and has now stopped eating. Soft Tissue Specialist Dr. Jonathon Bray suspects it is an abscess, but on closer inspection he soon discovers the culprit …
4	"Betty Boop, Maya & Kanzi"	12 October 2017
2-year-old Mastiff Maya has a leg tumour. Noel suggests young Maya may be a suitable candidate for his pioneering endoprosthesis surgery; cutting out the tumour and replacing the cancerous bone with a custom built titanium implant endoskeleton. 21-month-old tiny Pug Betty Boob has had trouble with her back legs since 8-month-old, and has now lost control of her hind legs and is doubly incontinent. She's had spinal surgery to remove a cyst elsewhere, and made a temporary recovery, but her symptoms have returned. Facing the prospect of euthanasia, she is brought to Fitzpatricks, and is seen by Senior Neurologist Dr. Colin Driver. The cause of 3-year-old Rhodesian Ridgeback Kanzi's lameness was a mystery. Most of the time, she is a happy and lively dog, with no pain, but occasionally she seemed uncomfortable. Noel takes a look at Kanzi, and is convinced that the problem might be with her neck.
5	"Mason, Bongo & Lucky"	19 October 2017
6-year-old Shih-Tzu adopted Lucky has been referred to Fitzpatrick's with severe arthritis in her hip, she is on painkillers and can barely walk. 2-year-old chocolate Labrador Bongo has been affected by osteoarthritis on all four legs. 4-month-old German Shepherd puppy Mason has a genetic disease called Osteochondritis Dissecans, where in some joints the cartilage doesn't develop normally and the cartilage never turns into bone and eventually wears away leaving a hole.
6	"Arlo, Drummer & Sooty"	26 October 2017
Senior Neurologists Dr. Jeremy Rose, is faced with an extremely challenging case. Arlo a 7-month-old Chihuahua was born with hydrocephalus, a neurological disorder where excessive fluid accumulates on the brain resulting in a bulging head. If left untreated Arlo will not survive the condition. Drummer, an 11-year-old golden Labrador comes to see Noel with severe elbow arthritis and back pain. The owner Mike has lost his short-term memory so Drummer acts as an unofficial assistance dog. Sooty, an 8-year-old black Labrador cross with elbow dysplasia comes from Normandy to see Noel. A French vet suggested amputation, but the owner hopes Noel will be able to save Sooty's leg.
7	"Baloo, Lola & Piper"	2 November 2017
A very large 7-year-old Great Dane Baloo, comes in for major spinal surgery. Baloo has Wobbler disease Syndrome, a condition that often affects this breed. At 85 kg, he will be one of the biggest dogs that Professor Noel Fitzpatrick has ever performed this surgery on. 8-year-old golden Labrador Lola comes in unable to walk on her right hind leg. She has been suffering from an injury for years after her sister, accidentally trod on her when she was a puppy. Lola has already had three previous surgeries to try to fix the problem. Lola has to have a custom designed knee replacement to fit her deformed joint, and the surgical procedure will be far from straightforward! 5-year-old black Labrador Piper has over the last 8 months had terrible pain in his right elbow. Diagnosed initially with osteoarthritis, he has been referred to Noel for an elbow replacement.
8	"Milo, Mauser & Storm"	8 November 2017
2-year-old Bengal cat Milo is brought in with a broken back and dislocated spine from being hit by a car. 6-month-old Rottweiler Mauser has a genetic condition, common in fast-growing large breeds, called Osteochondritis Dissecans which has destroyed the cartilage on the ridge of his main ankle bone. His owners want to avoid fusing the ankle solid and to maintain the mobility in his ankle. 2-year-old German Shepherd Storm has had severe developmental arthritis affecting his right elbow for his entire life. The German Shepherd Helpline is helping to fund the operation and Brenda from the Helpline comes along with owner Jen to support her. They embark on a difficult surgery using a custom printed implant system for a total elbow replacement.

=== Christmas Special (2017) ===
No.	Title	Original release date
1	"The Supervet at Christmas: Wall-e, Ivor & Botus"	21 December 2017
In this festive special, Professor Noel helps a 10-week-old Humboldt Penguin chick Wall-e from Longleat Safari Park with an unhappy foot. Three-legged Maine Coon cat Ivor lost four years his leg in a suspected animal attack is now suffering from a mysterious swelling in his remaining back leg. Approximately 2-year-old rescue Husky Botus comes to Fitzpatrick's with suspected hip dysplasia. Botus has come all the way from Thailand, where he was badly treated.

=== Series 11 (2018) ===
No.	Title	Original release date
1	"Teddy, Harvey & Juke"	28 February 2018
Tiny 4-month-old Jack Russel Terrier-Chihuahua cross puppy Teddy needs emergency spinal surgery after being attacked by another dog in the park. Teddy was shaken so badly that he has sustained life-threatening injuries and is unable to move or stand up on his hind legs. 4-year-old Bernese Mountain Dog, Harvey comes to see Noel, hoping that he can treat a rare cyst in his elbow. Normally a very excitable dog, the owner has seen a marked change in his behaviour and believes he's in a lot of pain. 6-year-old black Labrador Juke has been referred to Noel with severe pain in his right leg. When Noel examines Juke, he diagnoses severe elbow problems in both legs, which will require total elbow replacement surgery.
2	"Buster, Doug & Rusty"	7 March 2018
2-year-old Bulldog Buster comes with bad hip problems. When Noel examines an overweight Buster he discovers that his dislocating kneecaps and cruciate ligament issues are worse than his hip dysplasia, and recommends total replacement of the joint for both knees. 1-year-old Pug Doug's walking has deteriorated over the past six months and he is now doubly incontinent. Fitzpatrick's Senior Neurosurgeon Dr. Jeremy Rose needs to perform emergency spinal surgery on Doug, during which he will cut into his spinal cord to remove a cyst. 1-year-old crossbreed rescue dog Rusty from Romania has bad hip dysplasia and slipping kneecaps in both hind legs. The owners make the heart-breaking decision to tell Noel that if the micro hip replacement surgery doesn't go to plan he should let Rusty go while she is under the anaesthetic.
3	"Betsy, Beau & Rosie"	14 March 2018
5-year-old tortoiseshell cat Betsy has been diagnosed with a cancerous tumour on her back leg. Noel plans to save Betsy's leg by cutting out the tumour and replacing her knee with a unique bionic implant. 4-year-old Tibetan Terrier Beau comes to see Noel about her hip dysplasia after her owners have noticed a deterioration in her walking. Her surgery is far from straightforward, and Noel is forced to improvise during the operation to fit her new hip implant in place. A former street dog, an 8-year-old Staffordshire Bull Terrier Rosie is admitted as an emergency after her back legs suddenly collapse in the park.
4	"Raz, Oscar & Korky"	21 March 2018
A 6-month-old fox red Labrador puppy Oscar needs fitted plates and stem cell injections for rapidly worsening elbow disease. 7-year-old Russian Black Terrier Raz, has been diagnosed with a cancerous growth in his left leg. The owners hope they have come to Noel in time before the cancer has spread elsewhere in his body. 1-year-old short haired blue tabby cat Korky has been involved in a road traffic accident and is suffering from a crushed pelvis and a broken tail. Heartbreakingly, Raz fails to survive.
5	"Arnold, Benji & Kyte"	28 March 2018
Take That's Mark Owen brings his 18-month-old Doberman Arnold who is lame on one of his back legs. Noel established that Arnold had torn cruciate ligaments and the slipping femur had damaged cartilage in the knee. After cartilage removal and a procedure called a TPLO, Arnold came back, with the intention of injecting the stem cells that had been cultured. Unfortunately, Arnold had licked his wounds, which caused an infection. There was a set-back when Arnold was let off lead, causing him to become lame. Noel insisted he stayed on the lead for a further 4–6 weeks. 4-year-old Coton de Tulear-Shih-Tzu cross Benji has been diagnosed with hip dysplasia and the pain is now so bad he cannot bear to have anyone touch his hind quarters. 18-month-old Border Collie Kyte had a fall when he was a 5-month-old puppy and has been lame on and off ever since. The problem is preventing Kyte from starting his agility training. Kyte is brought to Noel in the hope of finally finding the cause of the lameness, CT scans confirm that the problem is Osteochondritis Dissecans.
6	"Bear, Ziggy & Noah"	4 April 2018
1-year-old Bear, a Caucasian Shepherd puppy is brought in. Bear was noticed limping at 3 months old and discovered that she needed two hip replacements. 4-year-old well-dressed English Springer Spaniel Noah is suffering from severe pain, believed to be caused by a fall. After seeing a string of vets, the owner is hoping Noel can help. Spinal surgery and extensive physiotherapy will be needed to get Noah back to swimming with his owner on his favourite beaches again. Sports pundit Lee Dixon brings his 3-year-old rescue dog Ziggy to see Noel. Ziggy is limping due to a cruciate ligament tear, an injury common amongst football players and one Lee, a former Arsenal player, is all-too-familiar with.

=== Series 12 (2018) ===
No.	Title	Original release date
1	"Lola, Sandy & Moogi"	12 September 2018
A 3-year-old golden Labrador Sandy needs a bionic solution for a deformed front paw. 20-month-old Newfoundland puppy Lola has developed a painful knee and also a painful shoulder that's causing her to limp. 2-year-old rescue black Labrador Moogi has had a difficult beginning, having been harshly treated in a previous life. Now severe elbow arthritis is causing him yet more pain.
2	"Simba, Cato & Tynee"	19 September 2018
7-year-old Persian cat Simba has been hit by a car, and has suffered huge skin loss on his front left leg and the bones on his right wrist have been crushed. Simba plays the vital role as young autistic Kian's therapy cat, and serves as a constant companion to him. 2-year-old Lurcher Cato, a rescue dog has a cancerous tumour in his jaw. It was removed but returned and is getting bigger. He is being brought in to see if Noel can save his jaw. 2-year-old Staffie cross Tynee is brought to the practice with developmental elbow disease affecting both front legs.
3	"Albie, Flora & Parker"	26 September 2018
Fitzpatrick Referrals faces an emergency admission after a hit and run incident that has left a 10-month-old Spaniel puppy Albie almost paralysed. 7-year-old Scottish Terrier Flora has a mysterious condition that other vets have so far failed to diagnose. She has developed pain in her lower back and is often found shivering and whining in the bathroom but after strenuous tests at local vets, nobody can provide an answer as to why Flora is in so much pain. 16-month-old Spaniel Parker has severe arthritis in both hips. Parker has suffered from hip problems since he was a puppy and has never been able to live life to the full causing him overweight.
4	"Hermes & Dave"	3 October 2018
Professor Noel Fitzpatrick faces one of his greatest ever practical and ethical challenges as he seeks to provide 5-year-old Hermann's tortoise Hermes, the one-legged tortoise, with three new prosthetic feet. Hermes was attacked by rats in garden and lost three feet. As this breed of tortoise can live for up to 80 years, Hermes should have his whole life ahead of him, so his owner decides to bring him to Noel to see if he can offer him the hope of being mobile once again by giving him prosthetic feet, something that has never been done for a tortoise before. 6-year-old Rottweiler Dave has had two previous hip replacements elsewhere and one done in 2011 has now failed, and is in need of Noel's help. Revision surgery is always a challenge, and Dave will need specially designed implants as his bones have been weakened from the previous operations. Heartbreakingly, Dave and Hermes fail to survive
5	"Poppy, Simba & Tulee"	10 October 2018
4-year-old Cavachon Poppy has not only a broken leg after escaping from back garden and being hit by a car but also has a serious tachycardic heart condition, meaning her heart is racing very quickly and she's struggling to breathe. When 1-year-old Labrador Simba is brought to Fitzpatrick Referrals, Noel is shocked by the severity of Simba's badly formed hips – they are in such a bad way that what should look like a ball and socket looks as flat as a saucer. 9-year-old Basset Hound Tulee has a spinal problem caused by diseased discs in her back and she is living in constant pain.
6	"Iver, Luca & Bow"	17 October 2018
8-year-old Newfoundland Iver is rushed to Fitzpatrick Referrals after collapsing in the back garden and having problems moving. Noel offers cutting-edge treatment for Luca, a 4-year-old Springer Spaniel with a painful elbow. There's also a leaky 7-month-old Labrador puppy Bow in need of urinary surgery. Senior Clinician Gerard McLauchlan found out that Bow has an ectopic ureter – a condition whereby one of both of the ureters (tubes that carry urine from the kidneys to the bladder) do not enter the bladder in the correct position and cause incontinence and urinary tract infections.
7	"Tom, Otis & Bailey"	24 October 2018
4-year-old French Bulldog Otis sustains a spinal injury after being chased by another dog in the park. 5-year-old black rescue Labrador Tom has a serious wound on one of his front paws. 10-year-old Cocker Spaniel Bailey was chasing a ball about 18 months ago and pulled up in quite a lot of pain in one of his hind limbs.

=== Christmas Special (2018) ===
No.	Title	Original release date
1	"The Supervet at Christmas 2018: Tatiana, Peppa & Luna"	6 December 2018
Professor Noel Fitzpatrick and the team treat a crossbreed rescue 1-year-old puppy Tatiana from Romania with severely deformed front legs, an 8-year-old Dalmatian Peppa with bulging discs in her neck and a 7-year-old Labrador Luna who has travelled all the way from Switzerland to have her painful elbows treated.

=== Series 13 (2019) ===
No.	Title	Original release date
1	"Koa, Kwanda & Cleo"	6 March 2019
6-month-old Bouvier des Flandres Koa has a severely deformed leg – causing his foot to bend out sideways. 11-year-old Rhodesian Ridgeback Kwanda is admitted to Fitzpatrick Referrals Oncology & Soft Tissue centre with a swelling bulge in the right eye. The swelling has begun to bother Kwanda and is reducing her eyesight significantly. 7-year-old crossbreed rescue dog Cleo has struggled with pain in her back leg for years following two failed total hip replacement operations. The previous surgery had only lasted a year but sadly regressed and the leg was lame once again.
2	"Fletcher, Molly & Hedgehog"	13 March 2019
10-year-old Labradoodle Fletcher pays a visit in need of revision surgery to fix a bad ankle fracture. An 11-month-old Carpathian Shepherd Dog Molly with a severely dislocated hip is brought to the attention of Noel – who suspects it is the result of trauma experienced in her sad start to life. The nearby charity Wildlife Aid seeks the advice when a hedgehog is rescued with two broken hind legs.
3	"Britney, Skyla & Bella"	20 March 2019
11-month-old prima donna Pug Britney with a genetic bone malformation, an 18-month-old Australian Shepherd dog Skyla with nerve compression in her lower back and a 9-month-old Jack Russell Terrier puppy Bella suffering from a crushed pelvis after a freak accident when she fell from a carrier on dad Peter's bike. All seek treatment from Noel and the team.
4	"Ren, Dave & Tallulah"	27 March 2019
6-year-old tiny crossbreed rescue Terrier Ren has been attacked by another dog and the paw of one of her front legs has been ripped off. 1-year-old French Bulldog Dave has a spinal deformity. 5-year-old, 70-kilo Newfoundland Tallulah has had a persistent weakness of one of her front legs. Tallulah already has hip dysplasia and may not cope very well on three legs. She is an emotional support dog for Carla, who has dissociative identity disorder. Heartbreakingly, Tallulah fails to survive.
5	"Bertie, Jade & Sophie"	3 April 2019
7-month-old fox red Labrador puppy Bertie is suffering from lameness, caused by a joint defect called Osteochondritis Dissecans. 2-year-old short-haired black & white cat Jade has knee problems caused by deformed back legs. 4-year-old English Springer Spaniel Sophie's kneecap keeps slipping, and as well has a cruciate ligament rupture, that are seriously affecting her joining in with the two other family Spaniels. Despite several previous procedures, Sophie's problems persist.
6	"Scrumpy, Buster & Ralph"	10 April 2019
8-year-old Clumber Spaniel Scrumpy is brought to Fitzpatrick Referrals. He has already had six previous operations to his elbows, hip and knee, but this time he is hardly able to walk when he arrives. Scrumpy also works as a therapy dog to the elderly residents in the care homes. 7-year-old Briard Buster is no stranger to Noel, who performed an ankle operation on Buster as a puppy. Despite years of excellent health, Buster is now lame, leaving Noel to wonder whether there's a problem with the original surgery. 15-month-old Dachshund Ralph is brought to Noel after it is discovered that he is unable to move. Scans reveal that Ralph has a mystery brain condition and Noel, along with his neurology colleagues, has his work cut out to identify the cause, which they suspect could be anything from an infection to a possible stroke or tumour. Heartbreakingly, Buster fails to survive.

=== Series 14 (2019) ===
No.	Title	Original release date
1	"Barney, Gylly & Albert"	19 June 2019
4-year-old Pug-Beagle cross, Barney, is hit by a bus and dragged along the tarmac underneath it, crushing an ankle and causing extensive damage to his leg. 10-month-old Labrador cross, Gylly – despite his youth – has developed lameness and an unusual bone deformity. 5-year-old rescue Basset Hound Albert is suddenly unable to move his back legs.
2	"Suki, Raffa & Zizi"	26 June 2019
5-month-old Golden Retriever-Poodle cross puppy Suki's front legs have been developing abnormally since the age of nine weeks and now require urgent attention as the bones of her forearms are growing at different rates. 11-year-old Labrador Raffa has become lame with constant pain in his front legs. Numerous options including medication, physiotherapy and hydrotherapy have been tried and now surgery might be the best option for him. 5-year-old Dachshund Zizi has suddenly lost the use of her back legs overnight. Noel explains that dachshunds are predisposed to disc problems, and an urgent MRI scan confirms that Zizi has suffered an exploded disc.
3	"Remy, Jazz & Olive"	3 July 2019
13-month-old Cocker Spaniel puppy Remy has lived in pain all his young life because of hip dysplasia, for which two separate full hip replacements have been recommended. 2-year-old cat Jazz is rushed in suffering from a smashed femur and punctured lung after being hit by a car. Jazz is a very special companion, providing therapy as well as friendship for family's special needs children. Her leg injury is not life-threatening, but there are other complications that could be. 8-year-old Dachshund Olive has suddenly lost the use of her back legs. Olive has worked as a therapy dog with pupils at a school since a twelve-week-old puppy. MRI scans confirm that a disc in Olive's spine has blown – a genetic issue in this breed.
4	"Hugo, Loki & Zahra"	10 July 2019
Hugo, a 9-month-old Newfoundland was diagnosed with hip dysplasia and referred to Noel for specialist treatment. Hugo also provides a bridge with the human world for Dominic, who has autism, and so his diagnosis has meant the end of hopes that he could be trained as a therapy dog. 1-year-old Rhodesian Ridgeback Loki comes in for an investigation of a developmental disease of joint cartilage affecting the talus bone of one of his back legs. Loki is still very young, and very lively, but has also been lame his entire life, and as a result, has always had to be kept on a lead. 7-month-old Havana Oriental kitten Zahra comes to Fitzpatricks after she had a mysterious accident at home, resulting in a broken leg. Heartbreakingly, Hugo fails to survive.
5	"Apple, Siam & Rosco"	17 July 2019
Apple a 1-year-old Bull Terrier puppy is referred to Fitzpatricks with an ankle problem. After walks or exercise, she limps and can't bear weight on his left hind leg. 4-year-old Collie cross Rosco has a suspected hip dysplasia. Because he requires specialist orthopaedic care, he has had to temporarily retire from his popular visits to local care home residents and is living in constant pain. 2-year-old Siamese cat Siam, is rushed in suffering from a broken leg, shattered pelvis and a suspected spinal injury after being hit by a van. Animals occupy a very special place in the life of family's daughter Heather, who has complex degenerative disabilities as well as dementia, and for whom Siam is a loving comfort.

=== Christmas Special (2019) ===
No.	Title	Original release date
1	"The Supervet at Christmas 2019: Bran, Lexi & Gabbana"	17 December 2019
Professor Noel Fitzpatrick sees 11-year-old Shih Tzu Gabbana with damaged discs in her neck and 8-month-old German Shepherd Bran who has a severe hip problem. Also visiting is 3-month-old French Bulldog puppy Lexi who's sadly been injured following an attack by a larger dog.

=== Series 15 (2020) ===
No.	Title	Original release date
1	"Merida, Brodie & Elmo"	9 January 2020
Bernese Mountain Dog, 6-year-old Brodie, is diagnosed with a painful bulging disc in his lower back and after the failure of previous treatment to produce a successful outcome. Merida a 6-month-old Rough Collie, diagnosed at 12 weeks with a severe developmental deformity: the bones in her front legs and elbows don't fit together, which has rendered her unable to walk properly. The five hour surgery is the most challenging of this kind, that Noel has ever performed. And Merida's nothing but straightforward journey has only begun ... 6-year-old black & white 'intact' boss cat, Elmo, has been hit by a car, resulting in a complex and serious fracture to his left back leg.
2	"Hagar, Loki & Nutty"	16 January 2020
Hagar, a 5-year-old French Bulldog, has suddenly collapsed and is struggling to stand. This is all hands on deck, a serious neurological situation. Excitable 5-month-old Staffordshire Bull Terrier puppy Loki is suffering from a problem where the bones in his elbows don't fit properly. 14-year-old tortoiseshell cat Nutty is rushed in wounded. This is no ordinary injury, as she has been deliberately targeted and shot with an airgun and hit with such velocity that her radius bone has shattered in multiple places.
3	"Bear, Bluebell & Henry"	23 January 2020
3-year-old English Mastiff Bear, 95 kgs, has come after suffering a ruptured cruciate ligament in his knee, and is in significant pain. 3-year-old Siamese cat Bluebell is rushed in after being hit by a car. 10-year-old Golden Retriever Henry is brought in, with a view to having surgery to treat a chronically damaged disc in his spine.
4	"Brandi, Molly & Lola"	30 January 2020
Chocolate Labrador, 11-year-old Brandi has bone cancer in her back leg, and limb amputation may be the eventual outcome. She is now refusing to walk and so they visit Fitzpatrick's cancer hospital for tests before consulting with Noel about options for limb salvage. 5-month-old Bulldog puppy Molly is rushed in after being run over by a car. Tests reveal a fractured front leg as well as a suspected dislocated hip and a lot of genetical problems ... 10-year-old Beagle Lola is brought to Fitzpatricks by the owner who is worried that she may have a spinal problem after collapsing on her back legs. Heartbreakingly, Molly fails to survive.
5	"Ted, Jess & Ruby"	6 February 2020
4-month-old Shih Tzu Ted has been injured at home with a broken right humerus, a very bad fracture which has not only splintered up into the humerus but has also broken through a growth plate. 9-year-old Schnauzer Jess is booked in for complex spinal surgery after an earlier operation on her knee. Scans reveal that since birth, Jess's spine has been growing with a deformity. 2-year-old Dachshund Ruby is rushed in after being run over by a car and sustaining life-threatening injuries. The following surgery is among the top ten of the most challenging, Noel Fitzpatrick has done in 29 years.

=== Season 15 (Summer 2020) (Puppy Special) ===
No.	Title	Original release date
1	"Rodney, Peggy, Elvis & Chica"	2 July 2020
In this four-part series, we revisit some of the most dramatic and inspiring cases, catching up with the families and discovering what became of the animals at the heart of these extraordinary stories. The first special episode focuses on the most irresistible patients of all: puppies. "The team here go all gooey when a puppy comes in" says Noel, "and we get no work done for about a half an hour." Featuring Bulldog Chica from 2017, Rottweiler Elvis from 2014, Miniature Dachshund Peggy from 2015 and West Highland Terrier Rodney, born without back feet from 2015. Rodney's operation was not only a 'world first' with this generation of the implant (called a PerFiTS) – but most importantly it could change his life for the better forever.
2	"Murphy, Adam & Peanut"	9 July 2020
The second special episode focuses on the some of Noel's most challenging cases and often the animals last chance. "Most of my work nowadays involves using customised implant systems" comments Noel. "Many patients have already exhausted routine options, so by the time I see them it may well be their last chance." Featuring Golden Retriever Murphy from 2016, Alaskan Malamute Adam from 2015 and black and white rescue cat Peanut from 2015 with deformed front paws. One ground-breaking option was to consider replacing his feet with made to measure prosthetic implants – bionic limbs – but as Noel points out "no-one's ever performed this procedure on a cat for both front legs before".
3	"Jersey, Darcy & Willow"	16 July 2020
In the third special episode, the dramatic and inspiring stories of three-legged ginger cat Jersey, Chihuahua Darcy and rescue Deerhound Willow from 2015 are revisited and finds out from their families what became of their much-loved animals.
4	"Jasper, Lulu & Marley"	23 July 2020
But what happened next? In the final episode of this new special series, the dramatic and inspiring journeys of Staffie Jasper from 2013, Rottweiler Lulu and German Shepherd Marley from 2016 are revisited, to find out what became of the animals at the heart of these extraordinary stories.

=== Christmas Special (2020) ===
No.	Title	Original release date
1	"The Supervet at Christmas 2020: Domino, Diamond, Willow & Luigi"	27 December 2020
Pop superstar Will Young brings 4-year-old Mastiff Domino with a knee problem and Diamond with elbow problems, who he rescued from America after they had been facing euthanasia. Supermodel Yasmin Le Bon's two dogs, 3-year-old French Bulldog Willow and 12-year-old Pug Luigi, seek specialist care for a painful spinal condition, after they both collapse the same day and are unable to walk.

=== Season 16 (2021) ===
No.	Title	Original release date
1	"Saving My Dog: Border terrier Keira"	27 May 2021
The programme follows Noel's own 13-year-old Border terrier Keira's battle for life, from just after the accident through each emotional stage of her treatment as a distraught Noel and his team jump into action and stabilise her life-threatening injuries.

No.	Title	Original release date
2	"Betsy & Angel"	27 May 2021
9-month-old cockapoo Betsy has been receiving a lot of treatment after being hit by a van five months ago, and has nerve damage on her front leg and now has developed gangrene; 9-month-old bijou Dogue de Bordeaux puppy Angel has had a genetic deformity on her front legs since birth.

No.	Title	Original release date
3	"Dexter, Driver & Bailey"	27 May 2021
7-year-old Dobermann Dexter has a serious spinal condition called myelopathy, 7-year-old feisty feline Driver has been hit by a car and suffers from hip dysplasia and a dislocated knee, 16-month-old Newfoundland Bailey has developmental elbow disease.

No.	Title	Original release date
4	"Rolo, Astrid & Jeff"	27 May 2021
10-year-old Dobermann Rolo has a very aggressive bone tumour on his shoulder, baby ferret Astrid has broken her back leg falling off a sofa doing a 'war dance', 5-year-old puddle-loving chocolate Labrador Jeff has life-long arthritis on his elbow. Heartbreakingly Rolo fails to survive.

No.	Title	Original release date
5	"Inca, Nala & Charles"	27 May 2021
7-year-old chocolate Labrador Inca's already athritic elbow joint has been further injured due to a trauma and the previous implants have been worn out, 2-year-old diva Cavapoo Nala has hip dysplasia that's causing her pain, 2-year-old Great Dane Charles has a squashed spinal cord that causes him Wobbler syndrome.

No.	Title	Original release date
6	"Angus & Rocky"	27 May 2021
Goldendoodle Angus has fallen 20 metres and has sustained nerve damage, irrepressible springer spaniel Rocky's failed elbow operation has left him struggling to walk.

== Awards ==
The Supervet was shortlisted for the 2014, 2015 and 2016 TV Choice Awards in the category of Best Factual Entertainment and Lifestyle Show.
