= Ballyfin =

Village in County Laois, Ireland

Ballyfin An Baile Fionn
- Village
- Location in Ireland
- Coordinates: 53°03′20″N 7°24′27″W
- Country: Ireland
- Province: Leinster
- County: County Laois
- Time zone: UTC+0 (WET)
  - Summer (DST): UTC-1 (IST (WEST))

Ballyfin (Irish: (An) Baile Fionn, meaning 'the fair/white town' or alternatively "town of Fionn") is a village and parish in the Slieve Bloom Mountains in County Laois, Ireland. It is around 8 km west of Portlaoise, on the L21121 local road which joins the R423 regional road between Mountrath and Mountmellick.

There are hill walks nearby in the Slieve Bloom Mountains. Most of the area is covered in forest.

== History ==
=== Pre-history ===
According to legend, Fionn Mac Cumhaill is said to have been raised in the area. Fionn ate the Salmon of Knowledge which gave him untold knowledge. Later he became leader of the Fianna.

=== Ballyfin Demesne ===
Ballyfin Demesne is a 600-acre estate that was successively home to the O'Mores, the Crosbys, the Poles, the Wellesley-Poles and the Cootes. Over the years, several houses have stood on the site. The present building is a neo-classical mansion built by Sir Charles Coote, 9th Baronet (1794–1864) in the 1820s to designs by the Irish architects, Richard (1767–1849) and William Vitruvius Morrison (1794–1838).

In the medieval period, Ballyfin was part of the cantred of Laoighis Reta, the territory of the Ó Mordha, or O'More, clan who lost out in the Laois-Offaly plantations, the most comprehensive settlement of the Tudor conquest of Ireland. In 1550 Edmund Fay was granted a lease for Ballyfin and about this date Ballyfin appears for the first time on the so-called Cotton Map (British Museum) where it is marked as a clearing in densely forested land.

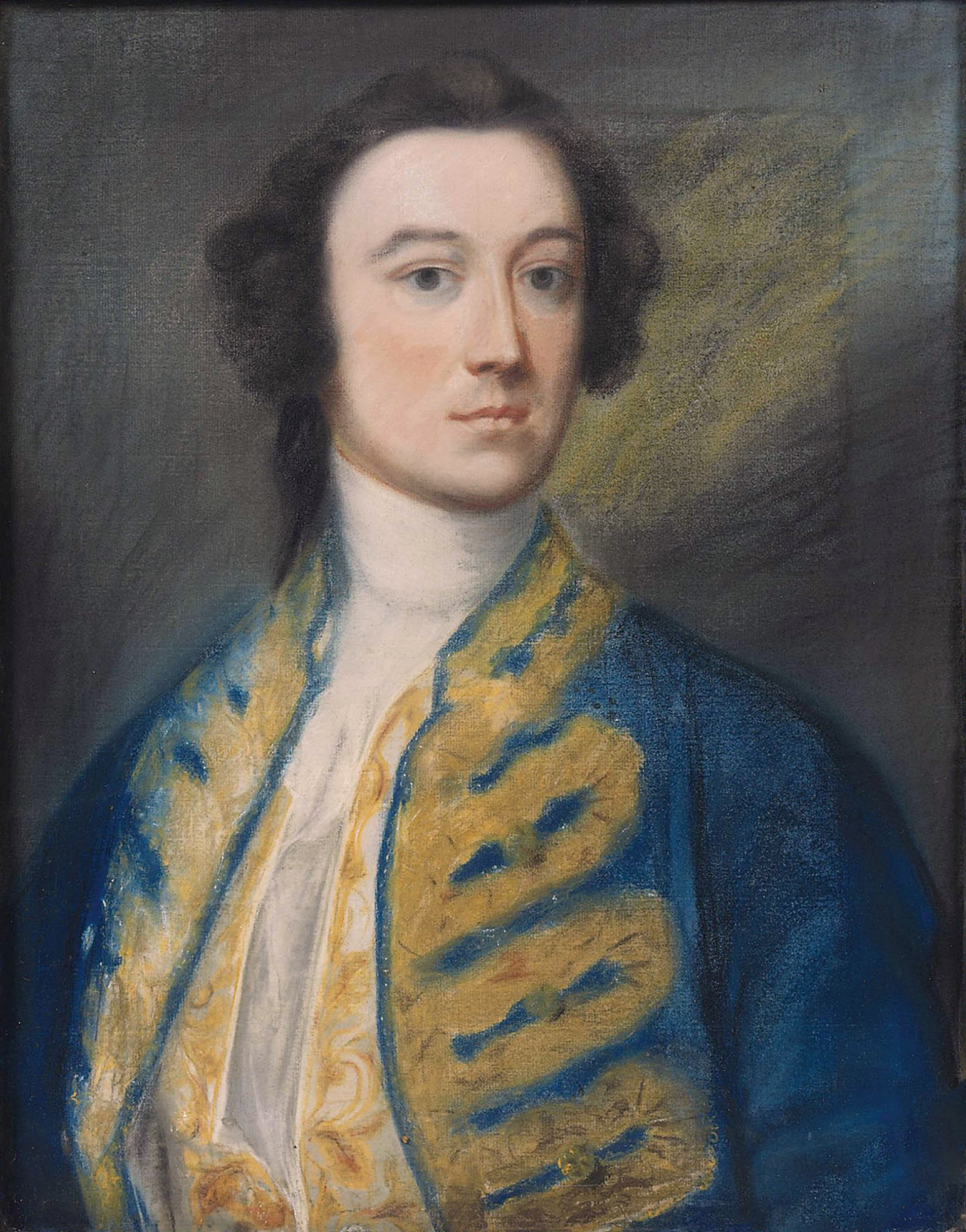
William Pole of Ballyfin (d. 1781)

About 1600, Sir Piers Crosby purchased lands including Ballyfin and erected a castle. By 1637, Ballyfin was raised to manorial status, but Crosby was on the wrong side in the turmoil of the 1640s and by May 1666, the estate was conferred on Periam Pole, a recent arrival from Devon. His successor William Pole built a 'modern house' to replace the Crosby castle and his son, another William (died 1781), together with his wife Lady Sarah Moore, (died 1780) daughter of the 5th Earl of Drogheda, set about transforming the demesne into one of the finest examples of the natural style of gardening to be found in Ireland. Centred on its 30-acre man-made lake, the landscape was much admired by Emily, Countess of Kildare, from Carton house in the adjoining county of Kildare who in a letter to her husband described Ballyfin as 'a most delightful place indeed, much beyond any place I have seen in Ireland'.

William Pole was succeeded by his cousin, William Wellesley (1763-1845), who was the elder brother of Arthur Wellesley, the future Duke of Wellington and who adopted the Pole name to become William Wellesly-Pole. Preoccupied with his political career in England, Wellesly-Pole left Ballyfin uninhabited for long periods, though he continued his predecessors' improvements to the demesne, employing the landscape designer John Webb.

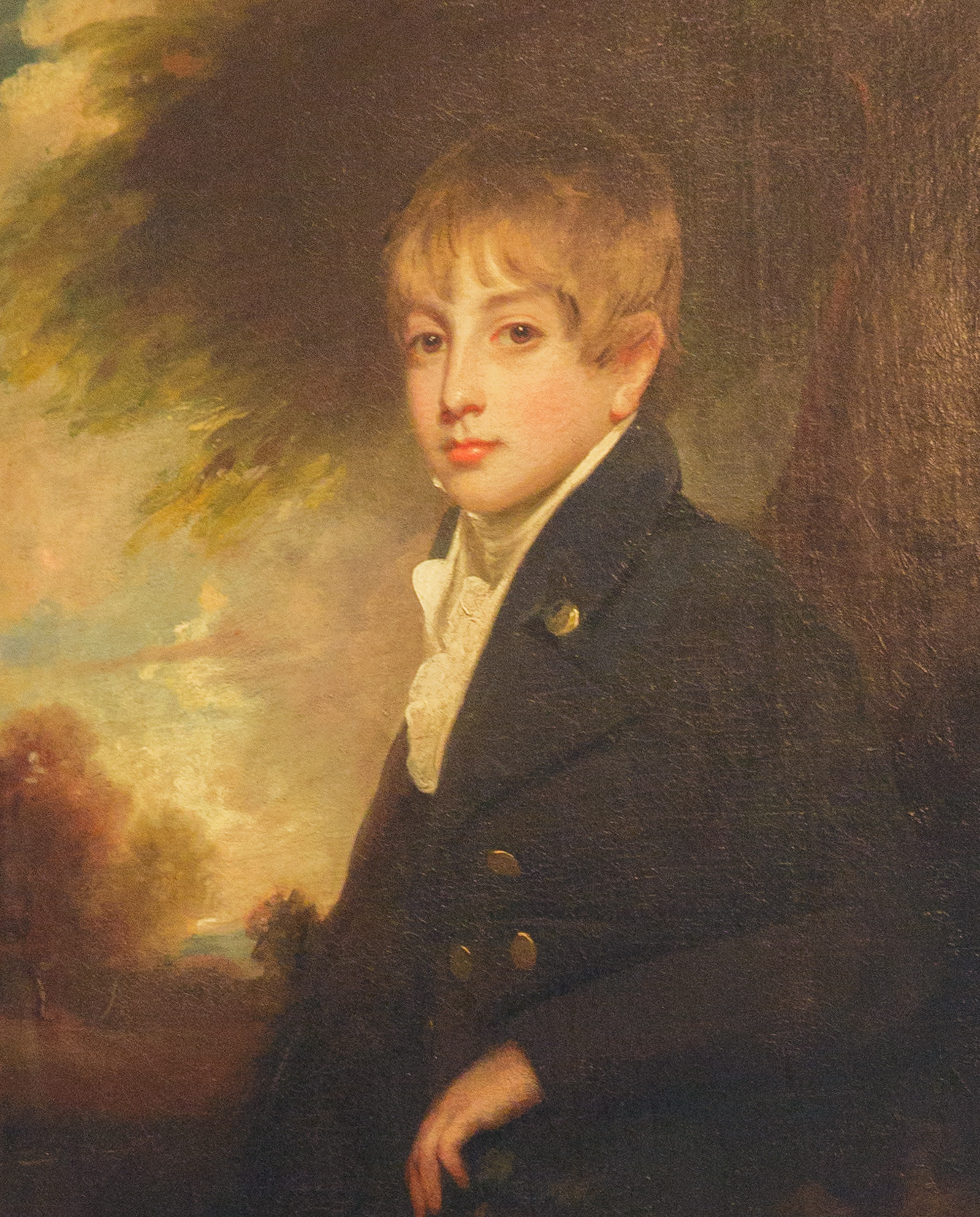
Sir Charles Henry Coote, 9th Baronet, c. 1803, by John Hoppner

In 1813, Wellesly-Pole sold Ballyfin to the young Sir Charles Coote, who had inherited the family baronetcy from his cousin the 7th, and last, Earl of Mountrath. The Cootes had been settled in Ireland since the arrival of the first Sir Charles Coote in 1601. An ambitious, indeed ruthless, soldier, Coote (1581–1641) had carved out vast estates in Ireland and been made a baronet by James I, before being killed at the siege of Trim in the 1641 Rebellion. Sir Charles's descendant and namesake, together with his wife Caroline, set about rebuilding Ballyfin on a magnificent scale. He retained ownership of Ballyfin until his death in 1864, when he was succeeded by his son, also Sir Charles. He in turn was succeeded by his brother the Rev. Algernon Coote, whose grandson Ralph finally sold Ballyfin in the 1920s as Irish Independence hastened the demise of the big house.

The estate was purchased by the Patrician Brothers, a Roman Catholic teaching order who ran a much-loved school from the estate, and who in 1928 added a wing to the house. In 2002, a decline in the number of brothers led the order to sell, and the school was moved to the nearby village of Mountrath. The estate was purchased by Fred and Kay Krehbiel, a Chicago couple with strong Irish connections, who partnered with Jim Reynolds to form Ballyfin Demesne Ltd. After a nine-year restoration project, Ballyfin opened as a luxury hotel in May 2011.

=== Architecture ===
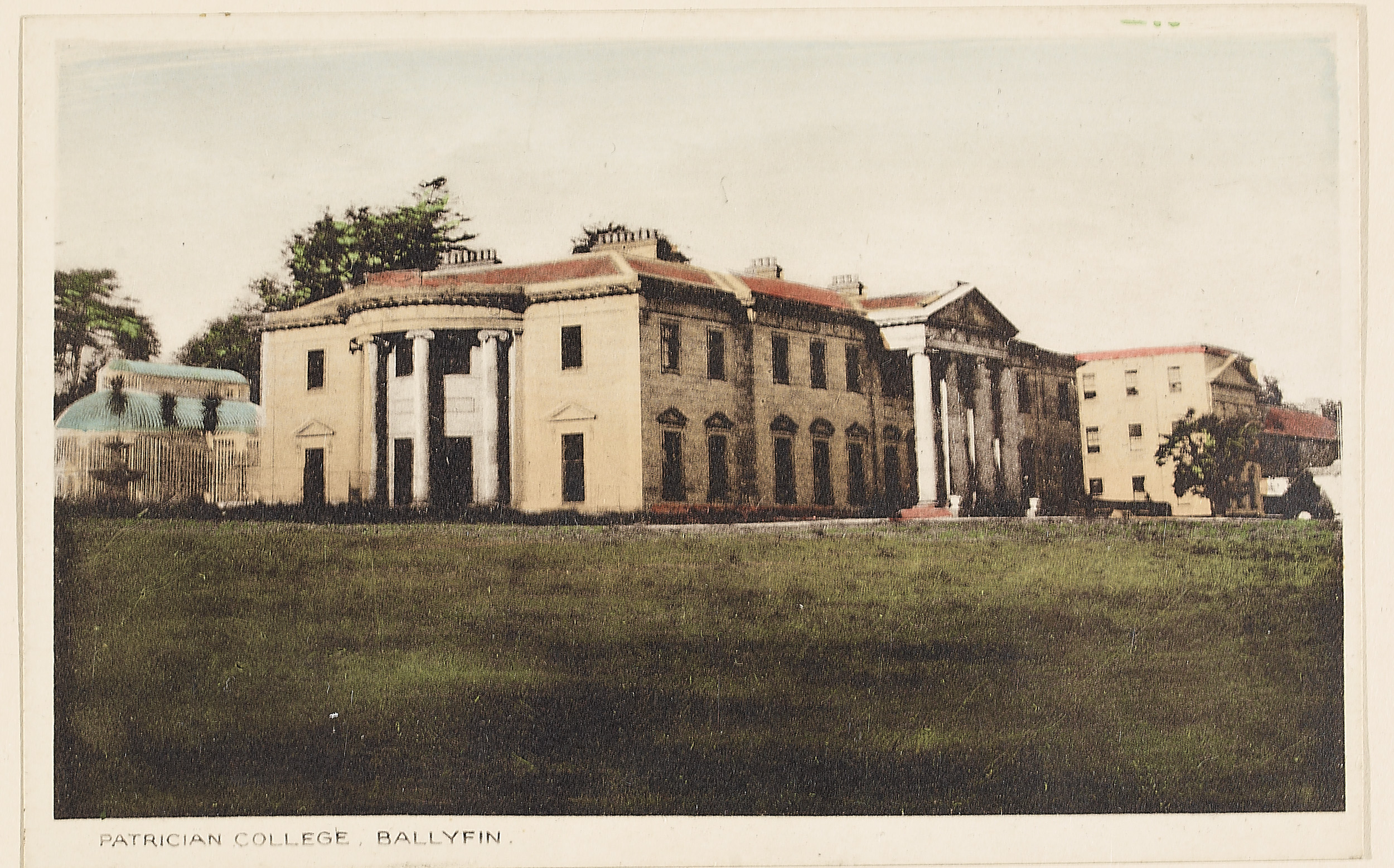
Ballyfin House, early 20th century

The house, built in the 1820s by the father and son team Richard Morrison and William Vitruvius Morrison, is known for its elaborate interior design in the Empire style. Originally, Dominck Madden (died 1837) was retained and work commenced on a house built to a long symmetrical H-plan, a short distance from the present structure. Madden was, however, sacked by the Cootes and the Morrisons employed in his stead. On the advice of Richard Morrison, the Cootes made the decision to demolish what had been completed of Madden’s building and to build afresh on a new site more favourably removed from the stables and farm buildings.

The house as constructed by the Morrisons is austerely neo-classical on the exterior, with a thirteen-bay façade broken by a portico with large ionic columns. The entrance hall, which has a richly-patterned Roman mosaic brought back from Italy in 1822, leads into the "grand saloon" in the centre of the house. Design sources liberally plundered by the Morrisons include Percier and Fontaine’s Palais, Maisons et autres Edificies Modernes (1798) and Iberian Moorish designs collected by James Cavanagh-Murphy. The inlaid floor of the Rotonda is based on the Lion Court of the Alhambra Palace, Granada, while the ceiling of the Stair Hall is influenced by Coleshill, Berkshire, attributed to Inigo Jones, and included in Isaac Ware's A Complete Body of Architecture (1756).

Among the later architectural additions to Ballyfin was a glass conservatory by Richard Turner (1798–1881). This was added at some point after 1855 and was accessed through a concealed door in a bookcase in the library. At about the same date, a folly in the form of a ruined medieval tower was constructed on the site of an old limekiln at the highest point of the estate.

=== Restoration ===
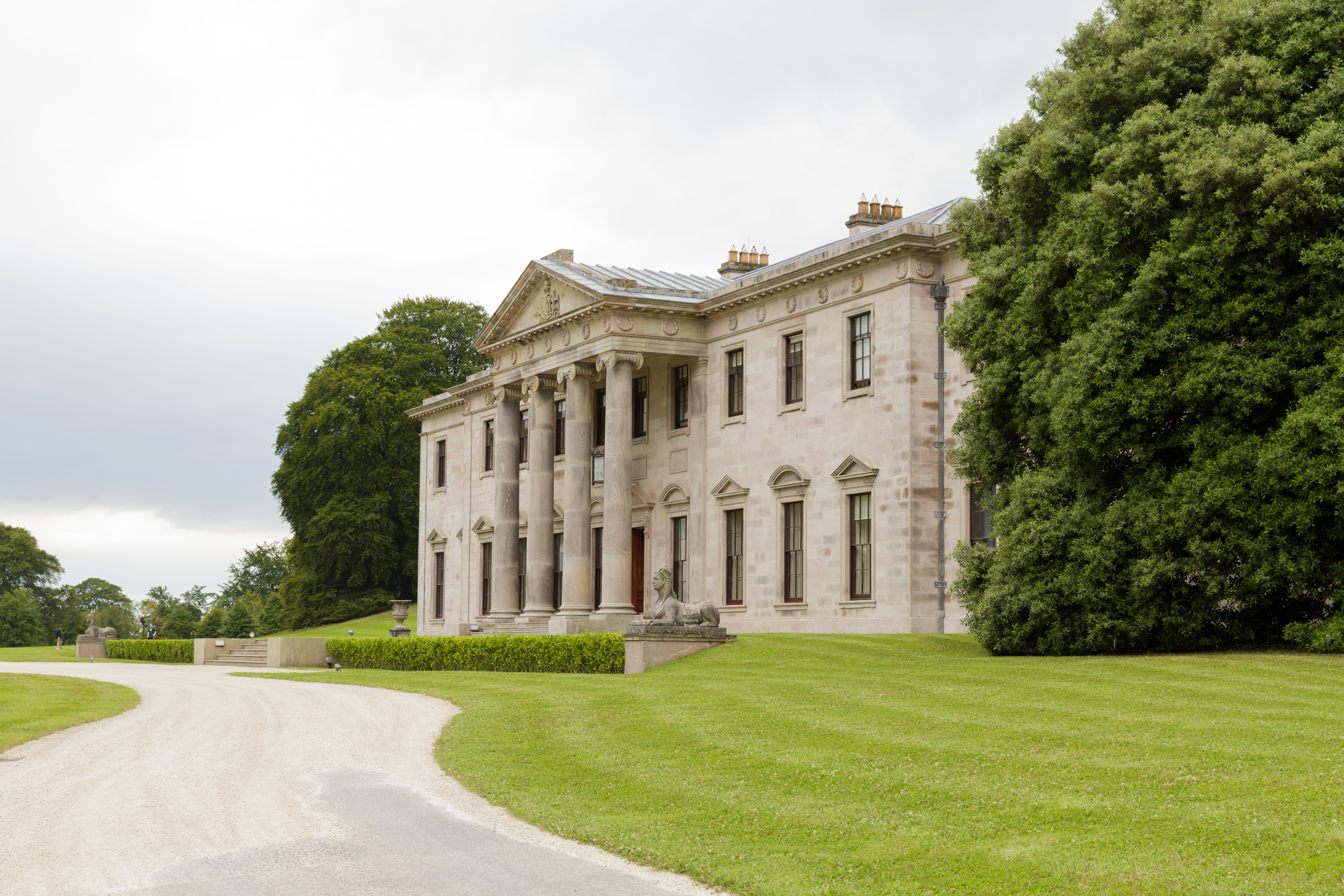
Ballyfin House, 2015

Having fallen into disrepair over the years, Ballyfin has been restored over the course of the last decade. The need for repairs had become apparent when a part of the ceiling in the Gold Drawing Room collapsed having been undermined by wet rot. Masonry was falling from the façade and the conservatory, overgrown with vegetation, was in a dangerous state. This attracted the attention of the Irish Georgian Society, who organised a fund-raising campaign. Despite this, the future of the house was uncertain, until Ballyfin's acquisition by the Krehbiels.

The restoration project took nine years – longer than it took to build the house in the first place. Craftsmen worked on the elaborate inlaid floors, repaired the gilding and the stuccowork or treated the stone work of the house which was disintegrating. The house and estate is now strictly private to hotel guests.

== Sport ==
The village also has a Gaelic Athletic Association club called Ballyfin GAA.

== People ==
- Michael Beary – Irish Army general and former UNIFIL commander
- Sir Algernon Coote, 11th Baronet, first-class cricketer
- Noel Fitzpatrick, vet on Channel 4's The Supervet

== See also ==
- List of towns and villages in Ireland
