= Wildlife Aid Foundation =

British charitable organization

- Company type: Non-profit
- Industry: Animal rescue and rehabilitation of wildlife
- Founded: 1980
- Headquarters: Leatherhead, Surrey, UK
- Key people: Simon Cowell (founder)
- Revenue: 1,281,736 pound sterling (2020)
- Number of employees: 5 staff plus 300 volunteers
- Website: www.wildlifeaid.org.uk

The Wildlife Aid Foundation is a charity dedicated to the rescue, care and rehabilitation of sick, injured and orphaned animals. Based in Leatherhead, Surrey, UK, the centre operates Surrey County's only wildlife hospital (one of the three largest such hospitals in the UK) and maintains a referral service for wildlife hospitals throughout Europe. The organisation also carries out environmental activist and educational roles. Wildlife Aid has attracted media attention for its rescues of wild animals such as young foxes and baby badgers; Animal Planet's TV program Wildlife SOS chronicles the activities of Wildlife Aid volunteers as they rescue imperiled animals.

== Wildlife hospital ==
Wildlife Aid got its start in 1979 when its founder, Simon Cowell, MBE acquired a farmhouse in Leatherhead with the intention of starting a local wildlife rescue facility. Formally established a year later, the centre's activities steadily increased in scale; the hospital now treats more than 20,000 wild animals a year, returning 70% of them to the wild. It has saved the lives of hundreds of thousands of animals since the charity's formation in 1980. The organisation currently operates on a budget of £350,000 per year and relies on over 300 volunteers to provide an all-year-round service. Its facilities include two operating theatres, a pathology lab, and an intensive care unit. The charity's longer-term aim is to build a larger complex on a new site that will allow the expansion of the organisation's educational programmes; the planned expansion would increase the facility's footprint to 10 acres (40,000 m^{2}), rely heavily on eco-friendly technology, and be carbon-neutral.

As of 11 November 2011, "Wildlife Aid" was reincorporated at the Charity Commission as the "Wildlife Aid Foundation".

== Wildlife SOS ==
In 1996, following a fire that destroyed one third of the hospital complex, Cowell found his organisation reliant on media attention for its continued survival. Cowell was approached by representatives of the newly formed Animal Planet channel to produce a television series chronicling the drama of life in the wildlife rescue facility. The show was originally produced by Cowell's Wild Productions, but later directly by the foundation, with Cowell as the presenter. It experienced long-term success; it has been cited as "the longest-running animal rescue TV series".

== See also ==
- The Bionic Vet, another Wild Productions' television series.
