= Noel Fitzpatrick =

Irish veterinary surgeon

Professor Noel Fitzpatrick MVB DSAS(Orth) CertVR DipACVSMR MRCVS
- Born: Martin Noel Galgani Fitzpatrick; December 13, 1967 (age 58); Ballyfin, County Laois, Ireland
- Occupation: Veterinary Surgeon
- Awards: Honorary Doctorate, University of Surrey (2009); Blaine Award, British Small Animal Veterinary Association (BSAVA) (2014); University College Dublin Alumni Award for Veterinary Medicine (2017); Honorary Doctorate, University of Bath (2018)

Academic background
- Education: University College Dublin (MVB, 1990)

Academic work
- Discipline: Small Animal Orthopaedics (DSAS(Orth)); Veterinary Radiology (CertVR); Veterinary Sports Medicine and Rehabilitation (DipACVSMR)
- Institutions: Fitzpatrick Referrals; University of Surrey; University of Florida
- Website: www.noelfitzpatrick.vet

Noel Fitzpatrick is an Irish veterinary surgeon, based in Eashing, Surrey, who came to prominence through the television programme The Supervet. Originally from Ballyfin, in County Laois, Ireland, he moved to Guildford, Surrey, in 1993, where he is director and managing clinician at Fitzpatrick Referrals. Fitzpatrick Referrals, based in Eashing, Surrey, specialises in orthopaedics and neurosurgery. He also leads the Fitzpatrick Institute for the Restoration of Skeletal Tissue (FIRST) at the same site. He previously founded a separate hospital specialising in oncology and soft tissue surgery in Guildford, which has since been bought out by the managing team and renamed. He is director of a number of biotechnology companies spun off from his practice.

== Academic career and research ==
Fitzpatrick obtained his Bachelor of Veterinary Medicine from University College Dublin, in 1990.

In November 2014, he was awarded the UCD Alumni Award for veterinary medicine. He was awarded an honorary doctorate by the University of Surrey for the concept of One Medicine: the advancement of human and animal treatments in tandem. He is an Associate Professor at the University of Florida School of Veterinary Medicine and Professor and founding member of Orthopaedics in the School of Veterinary Medicine at the University of Surrey.

In 2017, he was presented with the Blaine Award by British Small Animal Veterinary Association for outstanding contributions to the advancement of small animal veterinary medicine and surgery. The award acknowledges him as the creator of more than 30 new techniques in the field. Fitzpatrick is the director of Fitzbionics, a team of bioengineers focussed on developing new implants and technologies in animals.

In 2018, Fitzpatrick received an honorary Doctorate of Science from the University of Bath in recognition of his pioneering work in veterinary orthopaedics and neurosurgery, his leadership at Fitzpatrick Referrals, and his collaboration with the University on innovative surgical technologies aimed at improving both animal and human medicine.

== Veterinary surgery ==
In 2009, he became the first veterinary surgeon in the world to successfully apply an amputation prosthesis (PerFiTS) to a cat named Oscar who had lost both hind feet in an accident. In 2014, Fitzpatrick was recognised by Guinness World Records for being the first veterinary surgeon to conduct that operation.

== Television and radio ==
Fitzpatrick and his team at Fitzpatrick Referrals have been the subject of television series, including The Bionic Vet and The Supervet. Fitzpatrick has also appeared on The One Show, Graham Norton's BBC Radio 2 show, Steve Wright in the Afternoon, Heartbeat and The Chris Evans Breakfast Show. In October 2018, Fitzpatrick was the subject of BBC Radio 4's The Life Scientific, discussing his life and work with the programme's presenter, Jim Al-Khalili.

=== The Bionic Vet (2010) ===
The 2010 BBC documentary television series The Bionic Vet followed the work of vet Fitzpatrick and his team at Fitzpatrick Referrals. The series saw Fitzpatrick develop new methods and techniques to help pets with unique problems.

=== The Supervet (2014–present) ===
In 2014, Fitzpatrick and his practice became the subject of the Channel 4 television series The Supervet. It continues to run, and Series 12 was being broadcast in September 2018.

== Performing arts ==
Outside of his veterinary career, Fitzpatrick has a keen interest in acting. He has been cast in two episodes of ITV's Heartbeat as vet Andrew Lawrence, first broadcast in November 2002, and as sheep rustler Gabriel broadcast in January 2000. He appeared in an episode of the BBC medical drama Casualty (2005), around the same time he appeared in the documentary TV series Wildlife SOS, resulting in the BBC receiving complaints that the latter show included an actor who was pretending to be a vet. He has appeared in the ITV series London's Burning (2001), and two episodes of ITV's The Bill. Fitzpatrick's first film appearance was in the horror film The Devil's Tattoo (2003). He took the lead role in the film Live for the Moment (2004) in which he starred as David Fowler, and starred as Inspector Beckett in the film Framed (2008).
