= Wildlife SOS (TV series) =

- Created by: Simon Cowell MBE; Stephen Fry
- Developed by: Jason Giberti; Jim Incledon
- Directed by: Jim Incledon
- Presented by: Simon Cowell MBE
- Narrated by: Simon Cowell MBE
- Country of origin: United Kingdom

Production
- Executive producers: Simon Cowell; Ben Kelly; Mark Wild
- Production locations: Wildlife Aid, Leatherhead, Surrey
- Running time: 60 minutes
- Production companies: Face Productions; Amatis Film & Television Productions; Wild Productions

Original release
- Network: Animal Planet; Channel 5 ITV London; ITV Meridian
- Release: 1996 – 2014

Wildlife SOS is a British TV show which was presented by conservationist Simon Cowell. The show was created for Channel 5, and appeared on Animal Planet and the Discovery Channel. It is based in the UK's Wildlife Aid in Leatherhead, Surrey.

In 2014, the first made-for-web episodes of Wildlife SOS started to appear online, made by the Wildlife Aid Foundation. Throughout Wildlife SOS, in addition to 'special' episodes filmed at wildlife centres on the world, the main focus of the series has been on the work of staff and volunteers at the WAF wildlife centre in Surrey.

Wildlife SOS was produced by Wild Productions. Five million people watched the show in 2009. The show's final season aired from 7 April 2013 to 12 May 2013. To produce 6.5 hours of the show that aired in 1999, the producers spent a full year and filmed for 200 hours.

== Wildlife Aid ==
In 1996, following a fire that destroyed one third of the hospital complex, Cowell found his organisation reliant on media attention for its continued survival. Cowell was approached by representatives of the newly formed Animal Planet channel to produce a television series chronicling the drama of life in the wildlife rescue facility. The show experienced long-term success; it has been cited as "the longest-running animal rescue TV series" and continues to broadcast on Animal Planet, and various other channels owned by Discovery Communications. The TV series originally had 30-minute episodes but in 2012, this changed to a 60-minute format. The newest (2014) series of Wildlife SOS comprises shorter episodes available on-line on The WildlifeAidTV channel on YouTube.

== Wild Productions ==
Wild Productions were the official makers of Wildlife SOS until 2013 when production was taken over directly by the Wildlife Aid Foundation itself. The writer, narrator and presenter of Wildlife SOS is Simon Cowell, who was also the chief executive of the Wildlife Aid Foundation.

== See also ==
- The Bionic Vet, another Wild Productions' television series.
