= Oscar (bionic cat) =

Cat with prosthetic feet (2006 or 2007 – 2025)

- Oscar with his prosthetic feet
- Species: Felis catus
- Breed: Black cat
- Sex: Male
- Born: 12 July 2007; Bailiwick of Jersey
- Died: 20 July 2025 (aged 18 years, and 8 days); Bailiwick of Jersey
- Nationality: Jèrriaris
- Known for: Bionic feet

Oscar (12 July 2007 – 20 July 2025) was a black cat owned by Kate Allan and Mike Nolan who lived on the island of Jersey. In 2009, Oscar had both hind paws severed by a combine harvester; he would then undergo a pioneering operation to add prosthetic feet. The treatment has since been considered for use with humans. A book about Oscar's story, Oscar the Bionic Cat, was published in 2013.

== Biography ==
In October 2009, at the age of two and a half years, Oscar had both the paws of his hind legs severed by a combine harvester while in a maize field near his home in Jersey. The legs were cut between the ankle and the foot. Oscar was later found by a passing cyclist, who then brought Oscar to his owners' home. Mike Nolan was at home when the woman brought Oscar; he said that at this point Oscar was covered in blood, and he was convinced the cat would have to be put down. He and Oscar's other owner, Kate Allan, took him to their local veterinarian, Peter Haworth.

Peter Haworth, a vet at the New Era Veterinary Hospital in Jersey, dressed Oscar's wounds and administered painkillers making him comfortable within minutes. Haworth then referred Allan and Nolan to the Surrey-based neuro-orthopaedic surgeon Noel Fitzpatrick. After talking with Oscar's owners and looking at X-rays and pictures, Fitzpatrick decided that Oscar would be an ideal patient, partly due to his young age. Oscar was then flown to the United Kingdom mainland by air cargo, although he had to stay in his box for eight hours during the journey.

Oscar's owners did a lot of "soul-searching" before deciding to go ahead with the operation. Kate Allan later said that the cause for her uncertainty was that the kind of operation planned had never been done before. Although the operation carried out by Noel Fitzpatrick was a world first, it mimics a natural process, being similar to the way deer grow antler bones, in the manner that the implants grow through the skin. The implants were both custom-made to fit into holes drilled into Oscar's ankle bones. They are known as intraosseous transcutaneous amputation prosthetics (ITAPs) and were developed by Professor Gordon Blunn and Dr. Catherine Pendegrass of University College London's Centre for Biomedical Engineering. They have a honeycomb structure which enables skin to bond with the implant to prevent infection. The implants are placed into the drilled holes which then allow for a "sock" to be fitted over them.

The ITAP technology is currently being tested on humans and a prosthetic has been made for a woman injured in the July 2005 London bombings. Fitzpatrick has said he would welcome a collaborative approach with other surgeons working on human amputations.

In August 2012, as a result of a reoccurring infection in Oscar's right ankle, the ITAP snapped at the point where the titanium rod exited his stump. Peter Haworth once again made Oscar comfortable while possible treatment options were explored. Oscar returned to Fitzpatrick Referrals in 2013, where Noel Fitzpatrick performed a two-hour operation to implant a Perfits (Percutaneous Fixation to Skeleton) amputation endoprosthesis directly into Oscar's shinbone. A new exoprosthesis – or foot – needed to be developed for Oscar, as the removal of his ankle meant he could no longer wear a blade.

Oscar died in July 2025, at the age of 18.

== In media ==
The Bionic Vet is a BBC documentary following the work of Fitzpatrick which aired on BBC1 on 30 June 2010. The programme showed Oscar walking with prototype feet made for him by engineers at Salford University. Footage not shown on the programme of Oscar with a later set of better-designed feet was uploaded on to YouTube on 18 June 2010. An update video with the vet involved showed Oscar's new feet and explained how they are designed to snap at a break point on the 'blade' rather than within the foot if he gets into difficulty.

An update on Oscar's progress was given in the Channel 4 television series The Supervet. The television series follows the work of veterinary surgeon Noel Fitzpatrick and his practice Fitzpatrick Referrals. In Episode 1, broadcast on 7 May 2014, Vet Noel Fitzpatrick was shown fitting Oscar with his new foot following his recent surgery to replace the snapped ITAP.

Oscar holds two Guinness World Records, one for being the first animal with two bionic leg implants, and the other for being the first animal to receive implants into its moving joints.

== See also ==
- List of individual cats
