= Simon Cowell (conservationist) =

British conservationist, TV presenter, and author (1952–2024)

Simon Cowell MBE
- Born: Simon Maxwell Cowell; 19 April 1952; Epsom, England
- Died: 9 June 2024 (aged 72)
- Education: City of London Freemen's School; Jesus College, Cambridge (PhD)
- Occupations: Television presenter, conservationist, author
- Years active: 1983–2024
- Organization: Wildlife Aid Foundation
- Spouse: Jillian Geraldine Cowell (divorced)
- Children: 2

Simon Maxwell Cowell MBE (19 April 1952 – 9 June 2024) was a British conservationist, television presenter, and author best known for hosting the Animal Planet documentary series Wildlife SOS from 1996 to 2014. He was the founder of Wildlife Aid Foundation, originally titled Wildlife Aid, which is a charitable organization dedicated to the "rescue, rehabilitation, and release of British wildlife".

== Early life and education ==
Cowell was born on 19 April 1952. In his early life, he suffered from stuttering, and enjoyed singing. He attended the City of London Freemen's boarding school, and took part in multiple choirs and school musicals.

Cowell earned a PhD in biological sciences at Jesus College, Cambridge, and worked as a commodities trader through the 1980s.

== Career ==
Together with his ex-wife, Jill, Cowell co-founded the Wildlife Aid Foundation animal rescue and rehabilitation centre in 1983, several years after setting up a wildlife sanctuary on the grounds of his home. The organisation's activities were the subject of the television series Wildlife SOS, and subsequently a YouTube channel series with entries being released to the present day.

Cowell has been described as a "forthright, witty character" who is "not averse" to profanity. Ricky Gervais once described him as "David Attenborough with Tourette's".

He was appointed a Member of the Order of the British Empire (MBE) in the 2005 Birthday Honours for "services to wildlife". As an author, Cowell released a memoir entitled My Wild Life: The Story of a Most Unlikely Animal Rescuer in 2016.

== Personal life ==
Cowell had two daughters with his ex-wife, Jillian Geraldine. He resided in Leatherhead, Surrey, and Wildlife Aid Foundation was run out of his home.

=== Health and death ===
Cowell endured a self-described nervous breakdown in 1994, after which he decided to leave London and dedicate "all his time" to the Wildlife Aid charity.

In July 2022 it was announced, through his foundation, that Cowell had been diagnosed with an aggressive, terminal form of lung cancer in late June. A donation campaign for his organisation, titled Simon's Last Wish was launched on 15 July and raised more than £650,000.

On 11 May 2024, it was announced that Cowell's cancer had progressed to his vital organs and although he was still undergoing treatment, doctors had given a prognosis of a few weeks. He died of complications from the disease on 9 June, at the age of 72.
