= Cockapoo =

Crossbreed dog type

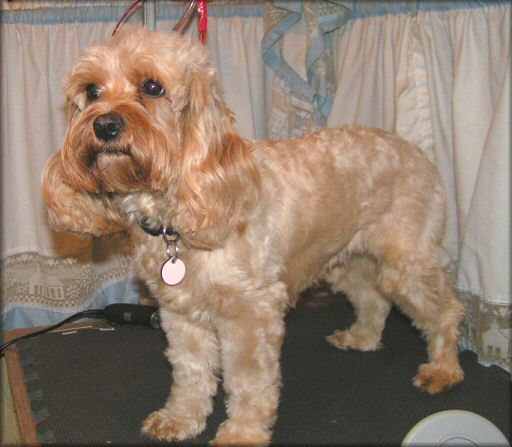
- A golden cockapoo.
- Other names: Cockerpoo; Spoodle (AU/NZ)
- Origin: United States
- Foundation stock: Cocker Spaniel and Poodle
- Breed status: Not recognized as a breed by any major kennel club.
Traits
- Height: ≈ 14–15 in (36–38 cm)
- Weight: ≈ 20–24 lb (9.1–10.9 kg)
- Coat: Long hair
- Color: All colors and combinations of colors

The cockapoo, also known as a cockerpoo (both portmanteaus of cocker spaniel and poodle) or a spoodle, is a dog crossbreed bred from the Cocker Spaniel and the Poodle, most commonly the Miniature Poodle.

== History ==
The cockapoo was first bred as a designer dog in the United States with the aim of producing a healthy companion dog that, it is claimed by its supporters, does not inherit many of the health defects common in the two parent breeds due to hybrid vigor. If both parents are healthy this can be true and the crossbreed is typically more genetically diverse than purebred dogs; however, "hybrid vigor" indicates an increased probability of health rather than a definite one for any specific animal. Cocker Spaniels and Poodles have been deliberately crossed in the United States since the 1960s.

In 2022, cockapoos were one of the most expensive dog varieties in the United Kingdom, costing an average of £1,336.15. Between 2019 and 2020, the average price in the UK rose by 168 percent, a result of increased demand caused by a national lockdown in response to the COVID-19 pandemic.

== Dimensions and appearance ==
Black cockapoo standing outdoors.

As with most animal crossbreeds, there is a great deal of variability in the cockapoo's dimensions and appearance. All colors or combinations of colors can be found, though most commonly they are white and brown. The coat can also be straight, wavy, or curled. Individual dogs that weigh less than 12 pounds (5.4 kg) are labelled toy cockapoos, dogs that weigh between 13 and 18 pounds (5.9 and 8.2 kg) miniature cockapoos and dogs weighing over 19 pounds (8.6 kg) standard cockapoos. Cockapoos can vary in temperament and in need for exercise.

== Crossbreeding ==
In order to promote the crossbreed in the United States, a dedicated club has been formed, the Cockapoo Club of America.

Cockapoos are available in F1, F2, and F2B, which is dependent on the parent dogs. An F1 cockapoo is bred from a purebred poodle and a cocker spaniel. This can also be called a first-generation cockapoo. When two F1 cockapoos are bred together, this creates an F2 cockapoo, and there are many other combinations breeding back towards the original poodle or cocker spaniel breed.

== Temperament ==
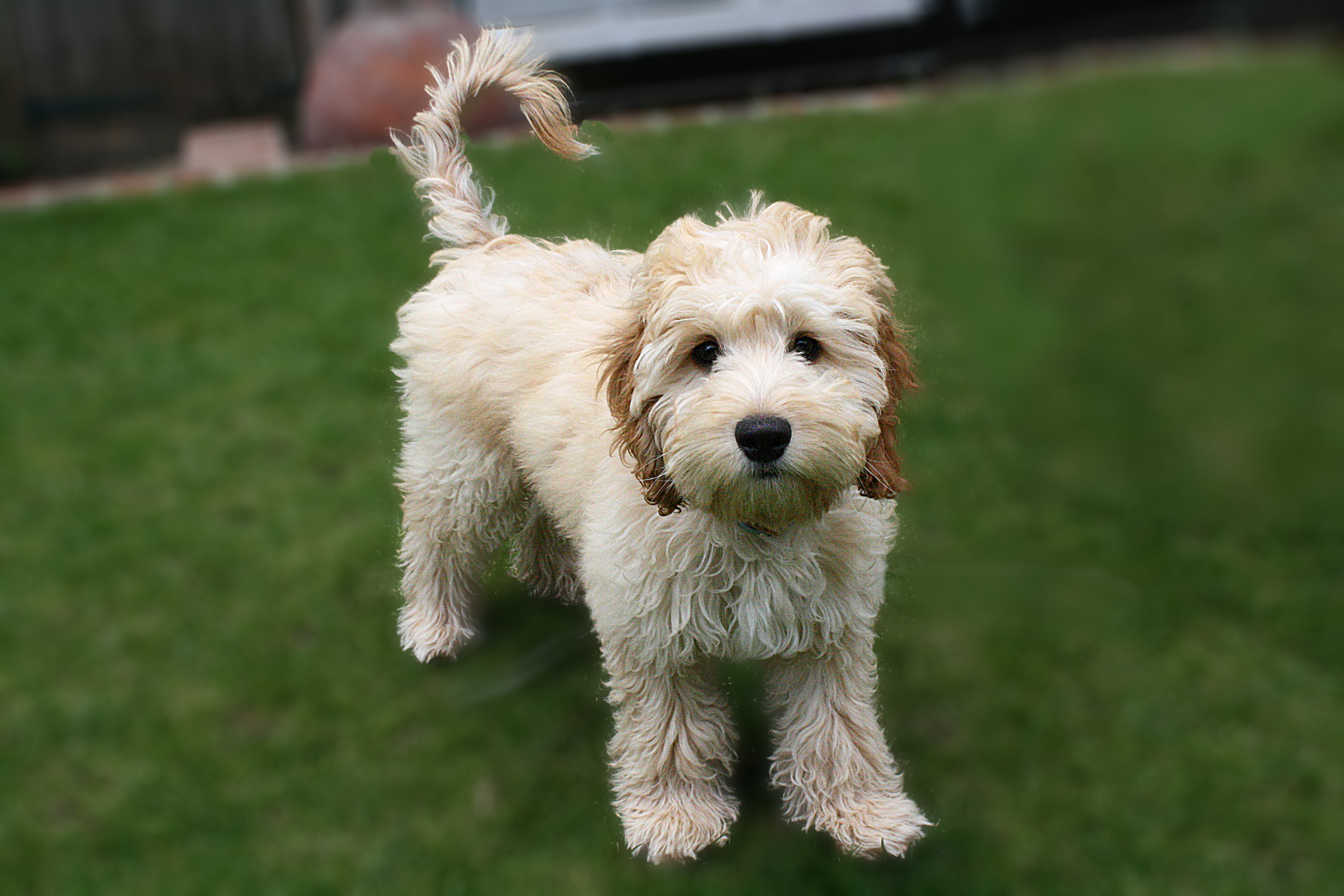
Cockapoo puppy, 6 months old

Cockapoos are known for their affectionate nature and lively personalities, with some believing that they inherit intelligence from both parents' breeds – the Cocker Spaniel and Poodle. It is felt this intelligence makes them generally easy to train. They are considered eager learners and quick at mastering new tricks when taught by a patient trainer. Cockapoos are energetic and require attention, exercise, and training to prevent boredom and potential recklessness. Due to their sociable nature, if left alone for too long, cockapoos have been known to develop separation anxiety.

== Health ==
Crossbreeds like cockapoos are generally healthy, and are known to have fewer predisposed health conditions compared to some purebred dogs. However, they do experience common health concerns such as allergies, glaucoma, hip dysplasia, and progressive retinal issues.

Like their parent breeds, the cocker spaniel and poodle, they're prone to developing ear infections. This is likely because of the long floppy ears that they inherited from the cocker spaniel, and the curly-haired floppy ears that they inherited from the poodle – both of which trap moisture and increase the risk of infections.

== See also ==
- List of dog crossbreeds
- Goldendoodle
- Labradoodle
