= The Bionic Vet =

British documentary television series

- Genre: Documentary
- Developed by: James Incledon
- Directed by: James Incledon
- Narrated by: Jon Rand
- Country of origin: United Kingdom
- Original language: English
- No. of series: 1
- No. of episodes: 6

Production
- Executive producer: Paddy Haycocks
- Producer: Simon Cowell
- Production locations: Fitzpatrick Referrals Ltd, Eashing, Surrey
- Editor: Jason Giberti
- Running time: 30 minutes
- Production company: Wild Productions

Original release
- Network: BBC One
- Release: 30 June – 4 August 2010

The Bionic Vet is a BBC documentary television series following the work of veterinarian Noel Fitzpatrick at his veterinary practice in Surrey. Fitzpatrick and his team of over 100 vets, nurses and support staff find new methods and techniques to help pets within more unique problems that would often leave euthanasia as the only option.

Many pets are brought to the practice from all over the country. Oscar the Cat, flown over from Jersey, was featured in the first episode.

== Episodes ==
No.	Title	Original release date
1	"Give a Cat Two New Feet - Done!"	30 June 2010
Noel Fitzpatrick gives a black cat named Oscar new back feet, first in the world and an 8-year-old Labrador Mayo, an implant to help him walk.
2	"Improvising With a Hypodermic Needle"	7 July 2010
Noel Fitzpatrick removes a tumour from a 1-year-old Labrador Charlie's leg and replaces the bone and wrist with a specially designed implant. He provides a bionic knee, replacing an arthritis damaged joint, for a 7-year-old Border Collie Sasha. A chinchilla Zippy has its arm bones secured by Senior Surgeon Michael Hamilton, after breaking them.
3	"Game Over?"	14 July 2010
The Border Collie Sasha from the previous episode requires spine surgery and Lottie the black cat hit by a car, has its pelvis rebuilt.
4	"I Can Only Give You 50/50"	21 July 2010
6-months-old puppy Ice is rushed to Fitzpatrick's referral centre having been trampled by a horse. Noel Fitzpatrick tries to reconstruct the dog's shattered leg as he battles the infection caused by the horse's hoof. There are concerns, too, for a 4-year-old Gatwick sniffer dog, Springer Spaniel Neo. He's been compensating for a serious knee problem in one of his back legs and requires significant surgery. There is an update on Lottie, the black cat with a shattered pelvis.
5	"One Grumpy Person Is Enough"	28 July 2010
7-month-old Shih-tzu-Springer Spaniel cross puppy Jolly has a painful bone deformity in both his front legs. His owner agonises over whether it's fair to put him through an operation in which Noel Fitzpatrick proposes to use a new technique to treat the bone growth deformity. Breezy, an 8-year-old Collie is rushed in partly paralysed, in the middle of the night, after being hit by a car. William the black cat, suffering from internal bleeding and shattered pelvis, gets a blood transfusion from nurse Pat's cat Orson. 7-year-old Labrador Flight, cannot contain his excitement, when seeing his owner Caroline. There is the risk that the newly replaced hip implant may dislocate ...
6	"A Couple More Taps and, Hopefully, We're In"	4 August 2010
Noel Fitzpatrick attempts a rare artificial leg implant (ITAP) operation on a 9-year-old Corgi Janto, only two dogs have had this before him. Viewers also find out whether the groundbreaking surgery to correct puppy Jolly's bone growth deformity has been successful and whether he can now walk pain free. There's a rare visit to Senior Surgeon Sarah Girling, from an unusual patient, a barn owl with a broken wing, plus the story of a stray rescue Jack Russell Terrier, eight-year-old Jade, who needs treatment from Senior Surgeon Michael Hamilton on a dislocated elbow.
