= Springer Spaniel =

Springer Spaniel refers to two different breeds of dogs, both of which are commonly called simply Springer Spaniel:

- English Springer Spaniel
- Welsh Springer Spaniel
