= Dog coat genetics =

Genetics behind dog coat

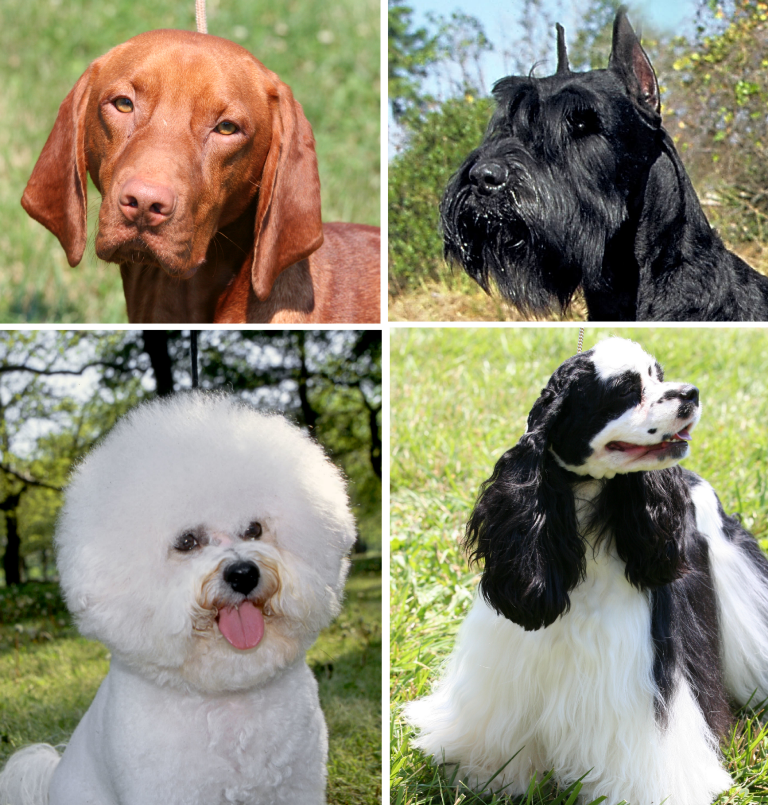
Dogs display wide variation in coat type, density, length, color, and composition. The colour brindle is the most common in dogs.

Dogs have a wide range of coat colors, patterns, textures and lengths. Dog coat qualities are governed by how genes are passed from dogs to their puppies and how those genes are expressed in each dog. Dogs have about 19,000 genes in their genome but only a handful affect the physical variations in their coats. Dogs have two copies of most genes, one from the dog's mother and one from its father. Genes of interest have more than one version, or allele. Usually only one or a small number of alleles exist for each gene. In any one gene locus a dog will either be homozygous where the gene is made of two identical alleles (one from its mother and one its father) or heterozygous where the gene is made of two different alleles (one inherited from each parent).

To understand genetically why a dog's coat physically looks the way it does requires an understanding of only a handful of canine coat genes and their alleles. For example, to understand how a black and white greyhound with wavy hair got its coat you'd need to look at three genes: the dominant black gene with its K and k alleles, the (white) spotting gene with its many variable alleles, and the curl gene with its R and r alleles.

== Genes associated with coat color ==
Each hair follicle is surrounded by many melanocytes (pigment cells), which make and transfer the pigment melanin into a developing hair. Dog fur is colored by two types of melanin: eumelanin (brownish-black) and phaeomelanin (reddish-yellow). A melanocyte can be signaled to produce either color of melanin.

Dog coat colors are from patterns of:

- Eumelanin — black, chocolate brown, grey or taupe pigment;
- Phaeomelanin — tan pigment, including all shades of red, gold and cream pigment; and/or
- Lack of melanin — white (no pigment).

By 2020, more than eight genes in the canine genome have been verified to determine coat color. Each of these has at least two known alleles. Together these genes account for the variation in coat color seen in dogs. Each gene has a unique, fixed location, known as a locus, within the dog genome.

Some of the loci associated with canine coat color are:

=== Pigment shade ===
Several loci can be grouped as affecting the shade of color: the Brown (B), Dilution (D), and Intensity (I) loci.

==== B (brown) locus ====
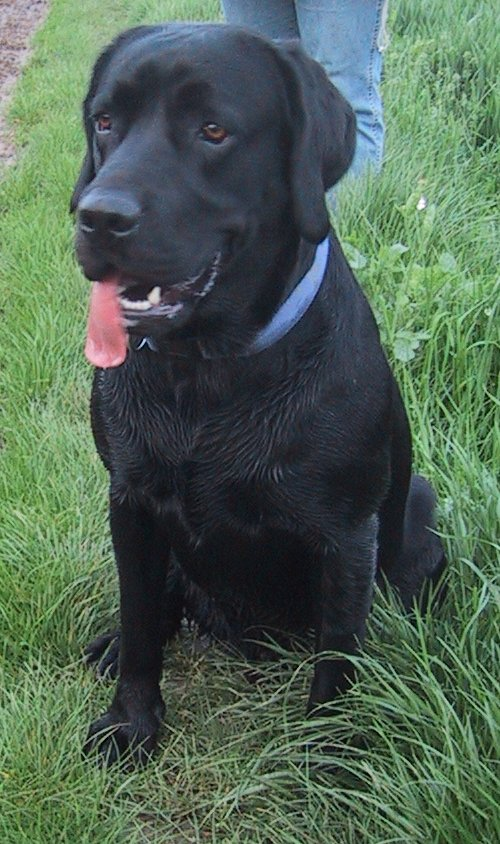
B/B or B/b

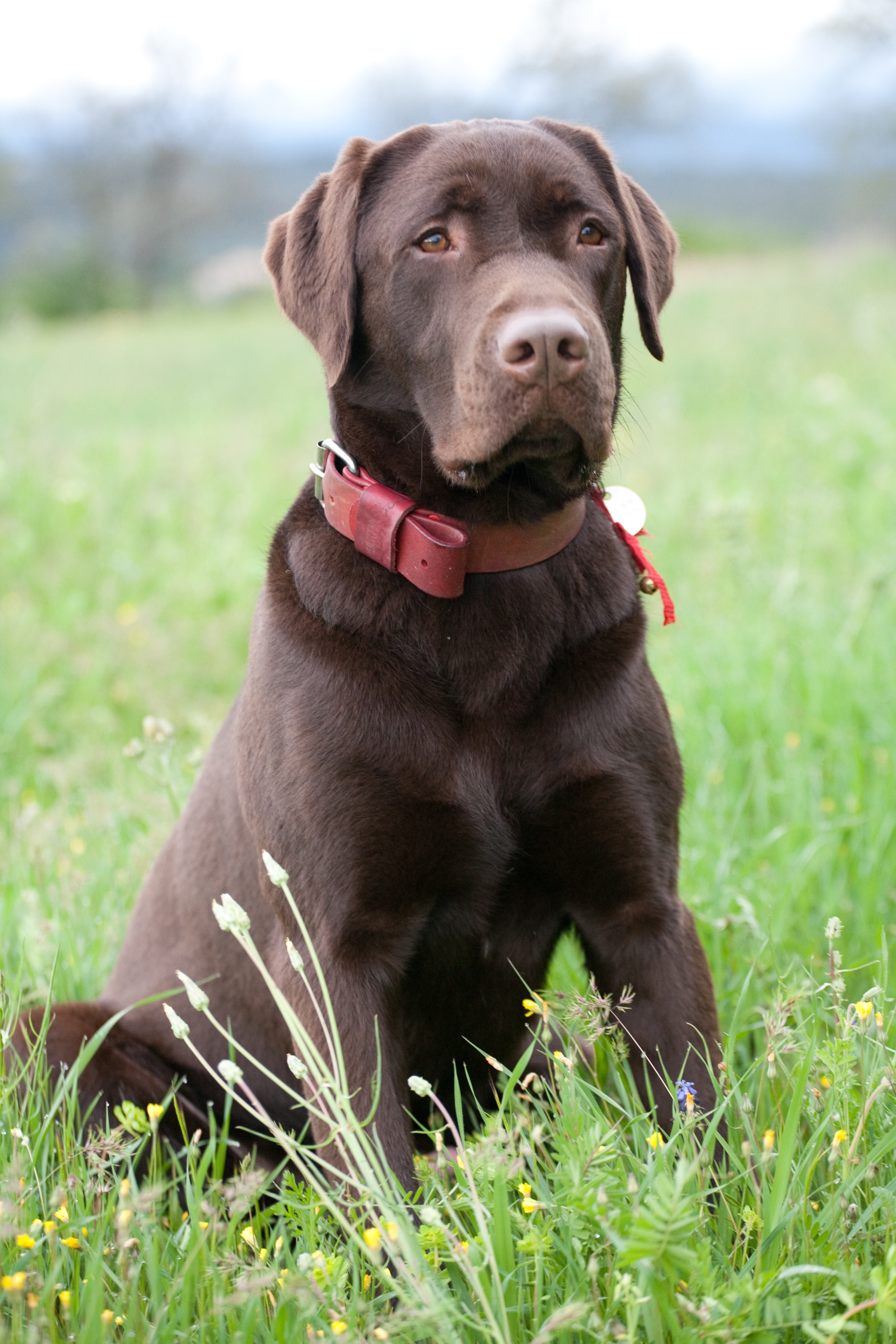
b/b

Eumelanin color due to the brown locus.

The gene at the B locus is known as tyrosinase related protein 1 (TYRP1). This gene affects the color of the eumelanin pigment produced, making it either black or brown. TYRP1 is an enzyme involved in the synthesis of eumelanin. Each of the known mutations appears to eliminate or significantly reduce TYRP1 enzymatic activity. This modifies the shape of the final eumelanin molecule, changing the pigment from a black to a brown color. Color is affected in coat and skin (including the nose and paw pads).

There are four known alleles that occur at the B locus:

- B = Black eumelanin. An animal that has at least one copy of the B allele will have a black nose, paw pads and eye rims and (usually) dark brown eyes.
- b = Brown eumelanin - such as chocolate or liver (includes several alleles - b^{s}, b^{d} and b^{c}). An animal with any matched or unmatched pair of the b alleles will have brown, rather than black, hair, a liver nose, paw pads and eye rims, and hazel eyes. Phaeomelanin color is unaffected. Only one of the alleles is present in the English Setter (b^{s}), Doberman Pinscher (b^{d}) and Italian Greyhound (b^{c}), but in most breeds with any brown allele two or all three are present. It is unknown whether the different brown alleles cause specific shades or hues of brown.

B is dominant to b.

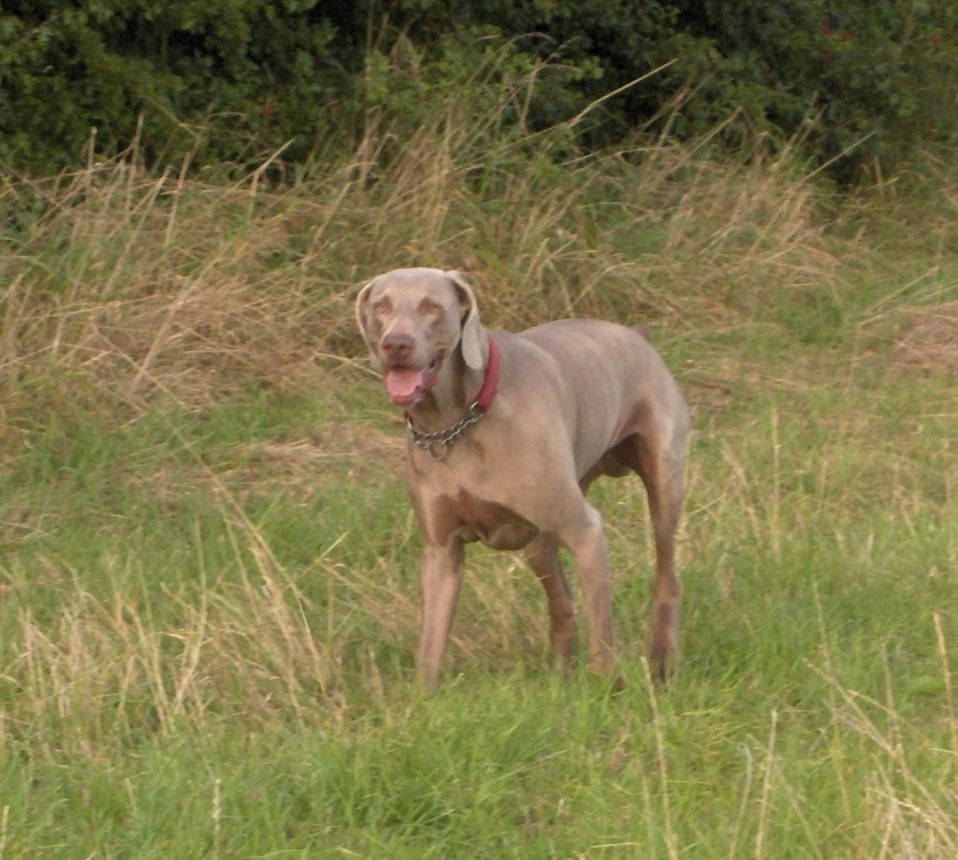
Weimaraner (standard). K^{B} for solid eumelanin coat; b/b for brown eumelanin lightened by d/d dilution.

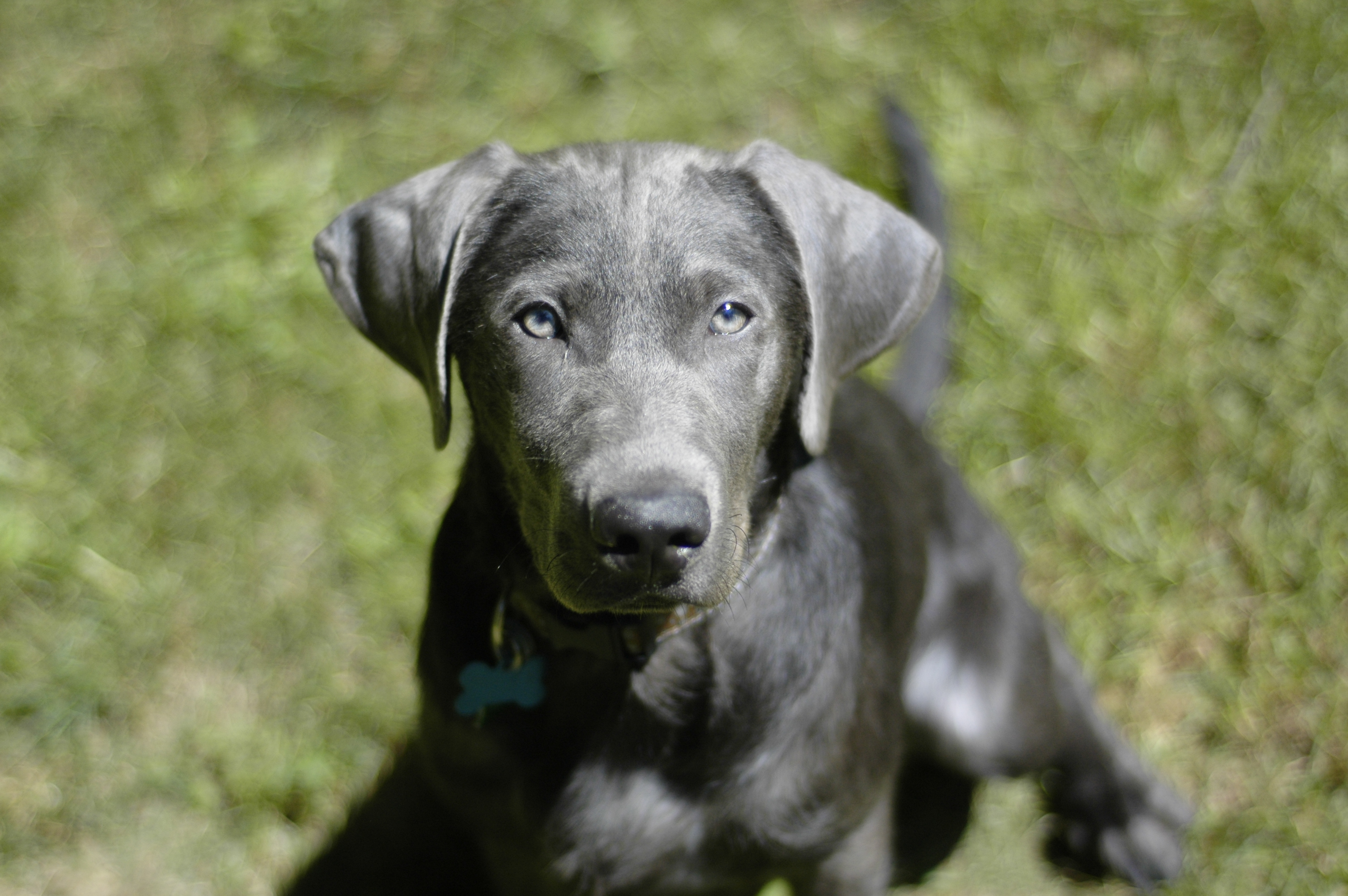
Labrador (non-standard): K^{B} for solid eumelanin coat; B/_ for black eumelanin lightened by d/d dilution. Labrador dogs with the dilute gene often suffer from color dilution alopecia.

==== D (dilute) locus ====
The melanophilin gene (MLPH) at the D locus causes a dilution mainly of eumelanin, while phaeomelanin is less affected. This dilution gene determines the intensity of pigmentation. MLPH codes for a protein involved in the distribution of melanin - it is part of the melanosome transport complex. Defective MLPH prevents normal pigment distribution, resulting in a paler colored coat.

There are two common alleles: D (normal, wild-type MLPH), and d (defective MLPH) that occur in many breeds. But recently the research group of Tosso Leeb has identified additional alleles in other breeds.

- D = Not diluted. Black or brown eumelanin (as determined by Brown locus), reddish or orangish tan phaeomelanin.
- d = Diluted. Diluted fur color: black eumelanin (B/-) diluted to bluish grey (ranging from light blue-grey to dark steel); brown eumelanin (b/b) diluted to taupe or "Isabella". Phaeomelanin is diluted from red to yellowish tan; this phaeomelanin dilution is not as dramatic as the eumelanin color shift. Slight to moderate dilution of the paw pads and eye rims towards bluish grey if B/- or taupe if b/b, and slight to moderate reduction of eye color from brown towards amber in a B/- animal, or from hazel towards light amber in a b/b animal.

D is completely dominant to d.

This dilution gene can occur in many breeds including: Weimaraner, Slovak Pointer, Italian greyhounds, whippets, Tibetan mastiffs, greyhounds, Staffordshire bull terriers, and Neapolitan mastiffs.

==== Color gene interactions ====
Colour gene interactions	Not dilute (D/D or D/d)	Dilute (d/d)
Black; B/B or B/b	Black eumelanin Red* phaeomelanin	Blue-grey eumelanin Yellow phaeomelanin
Brown b/b	Chocolate-brown eumelanin Red* phaeomelanin	Taupe or "Isabella" eumelanin Yellow phaeomelanin
* Note that phaeomelanin is frequently diluted by intensity factor of theoretical I locus.

==== I (intensity) locus ====
The alleles responsible for pheomelanin dilution (changing of a dog's coat from tan to cream or white) was found to be the result of a mutation in MFSD12 in 2019. and occurs in breeds that do not exhibit dark gold or red phenotypes.

Two alleles are theorised to occur at the I locus:

- I = Non-diluted pigment
- i = Diluted pigment

It's been observed that I and i interact with semi-dominance, so that there are three distinct phenotypes. I/i heterozygotes are paler than I/I animals but normally darker than i/i animals.

- i results in diluted phaeomelanin such as cream, yellow, and white. Unlike d/d, it allows the skin and eyes to remain dark.

It does not effect eumelanin (black/brown/blue/lilac) pigment, i.e. leaving a cream Afghan with a very black mask.

This is not to be confused with the cream or white in Nordic Breeds such as the Siberian Husky, or cream roan in the Australian Cattle Dog, whose cream and white coats are controlled by genes in the Extension E Locus.

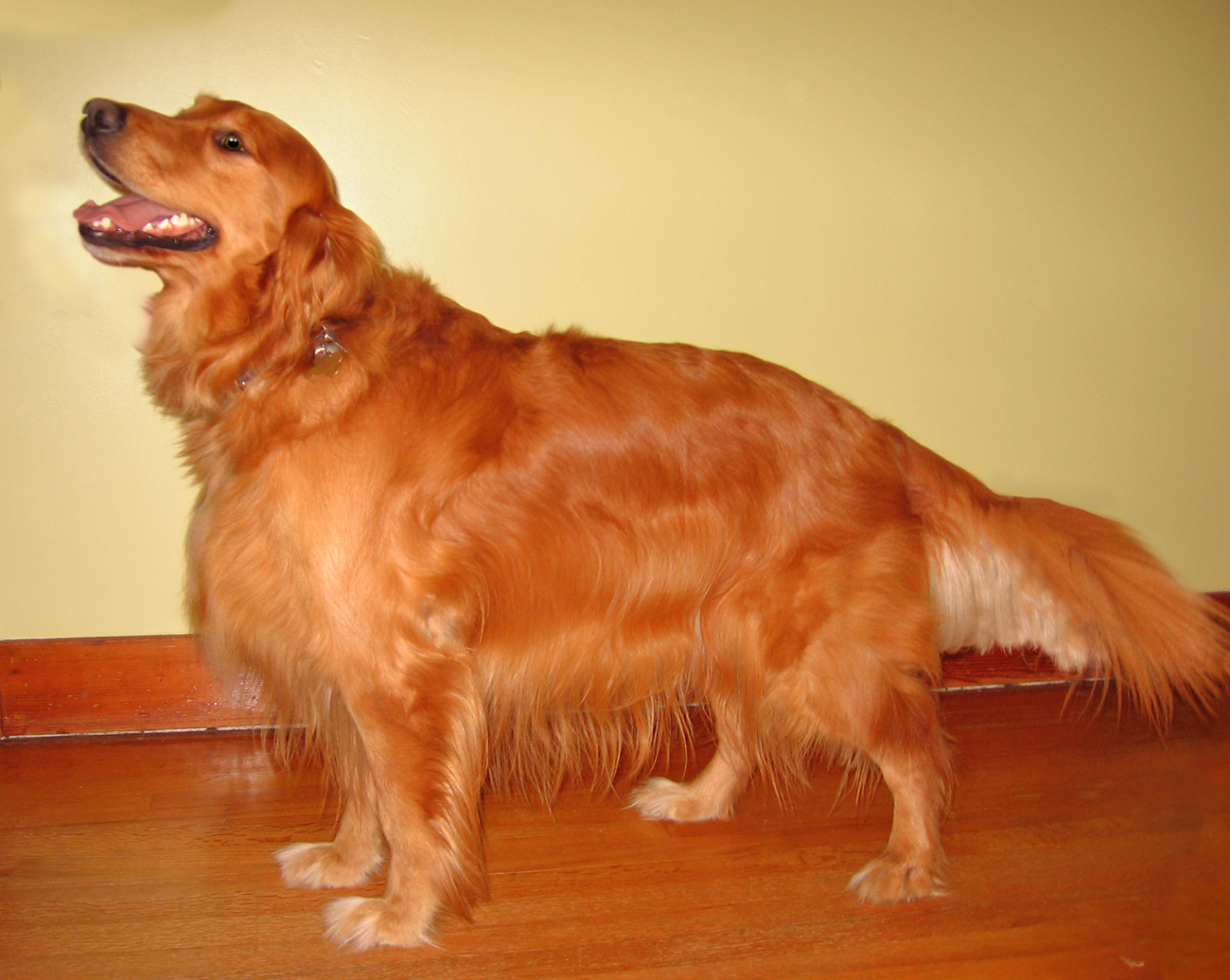
Golden Retriever genotype II

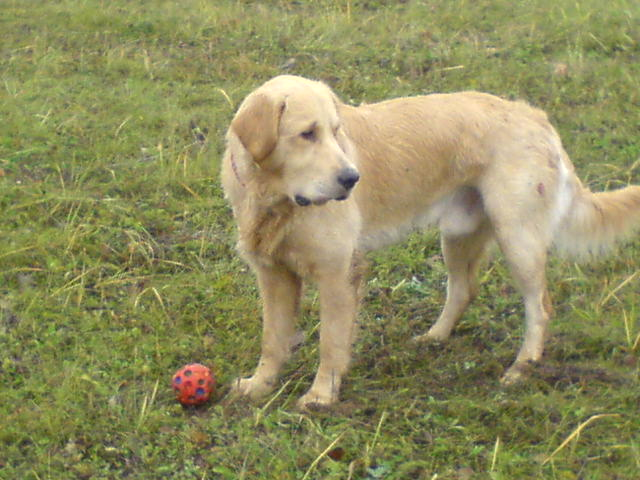
Golden Retriever genotype Ii

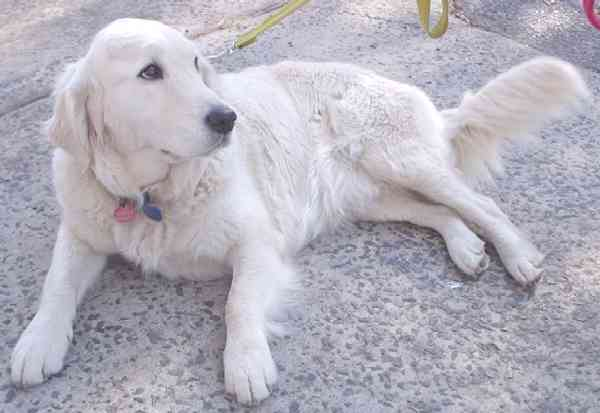
Golden Retriever genotype ii

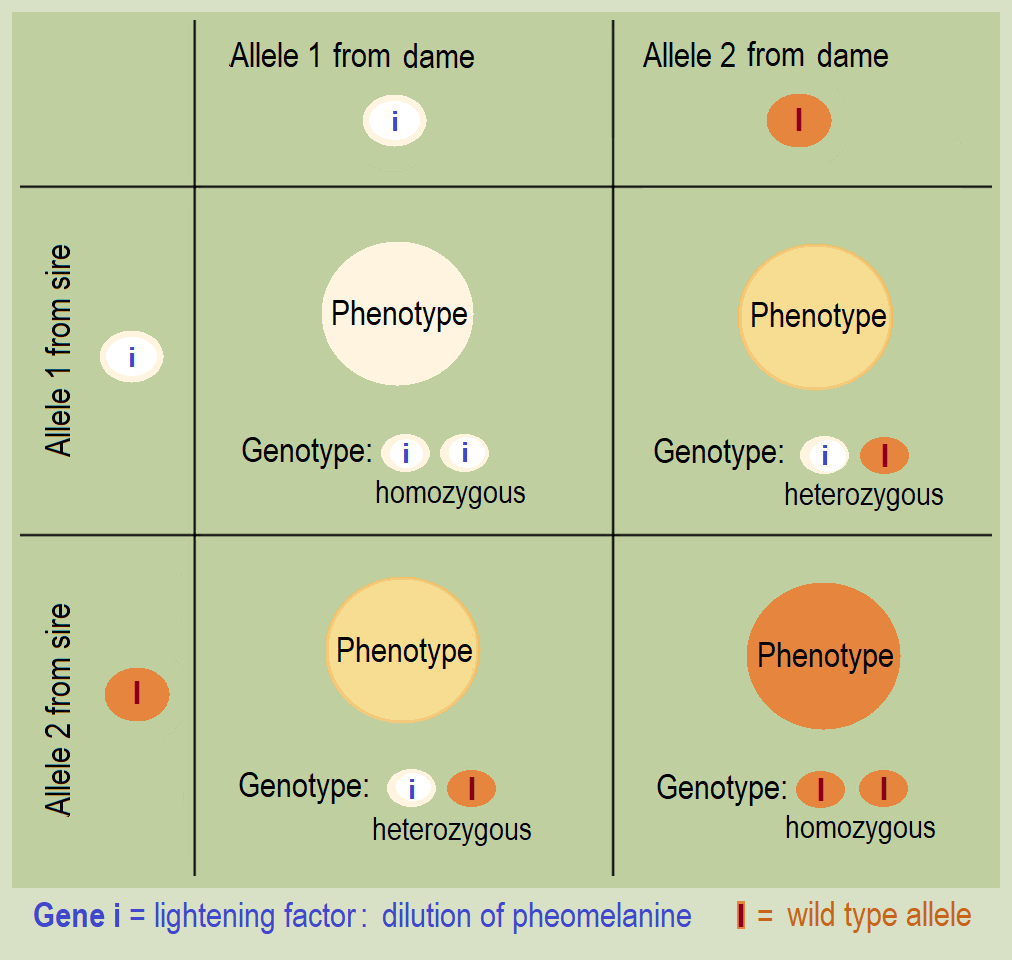
Punnett square: intermediate inheritance
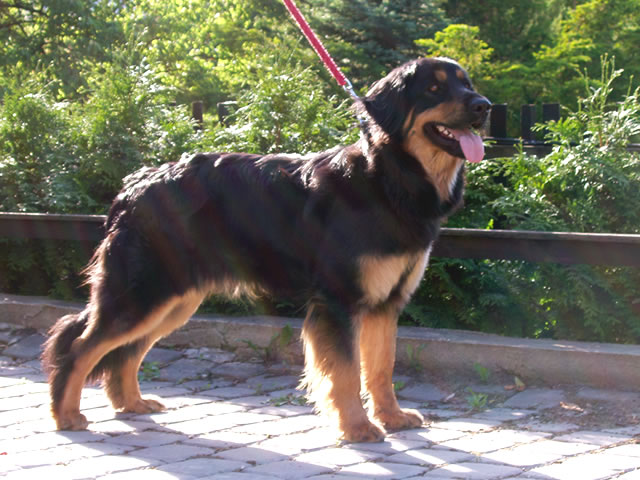
Hovawart: black and tan, genotype II)

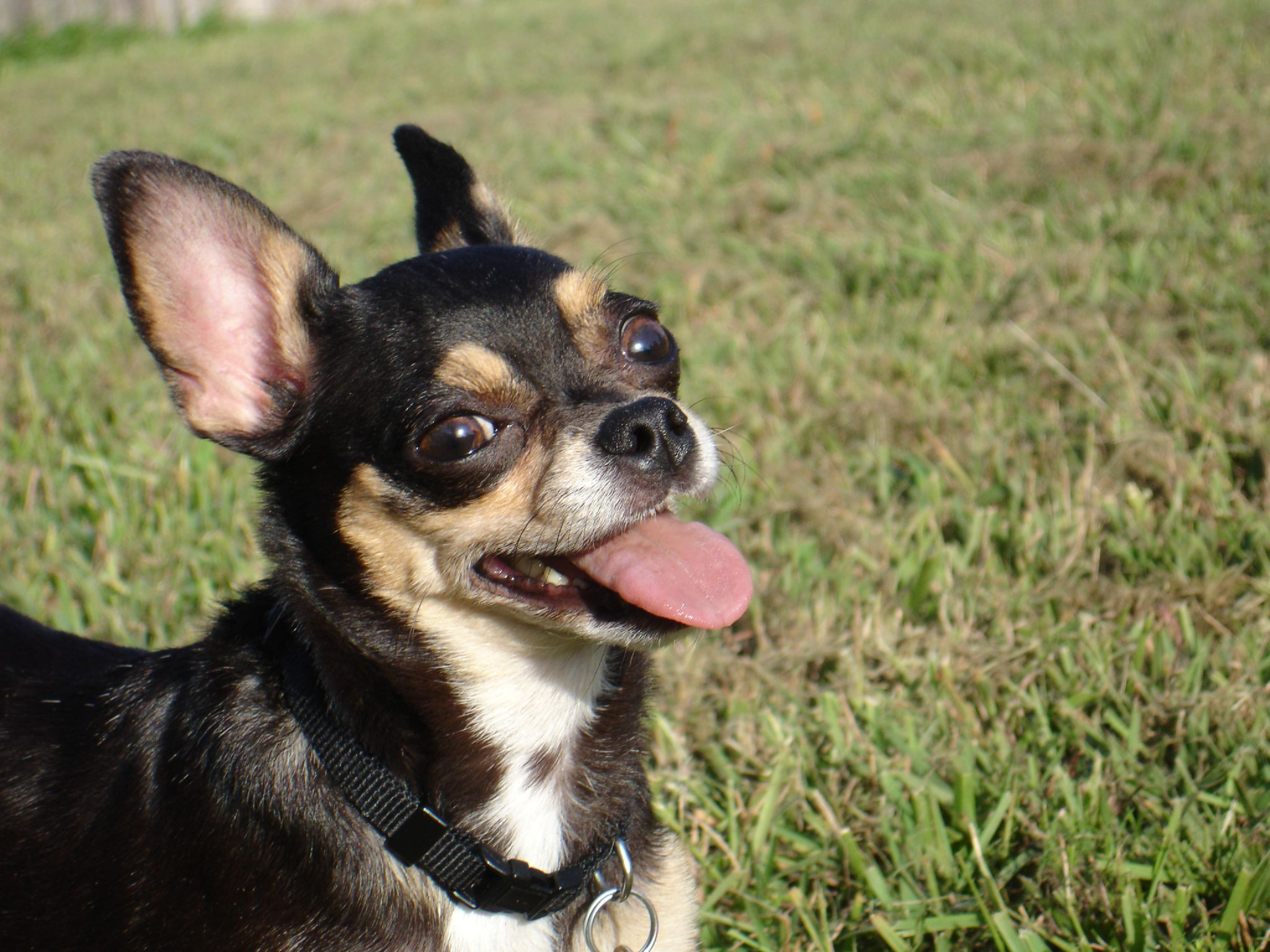
Chihuahua: tan is lightened to creme, genotype Ii

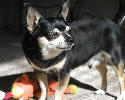
Chihuahua: same parts are creme-white, genotype ii

==== Red Pigment ====
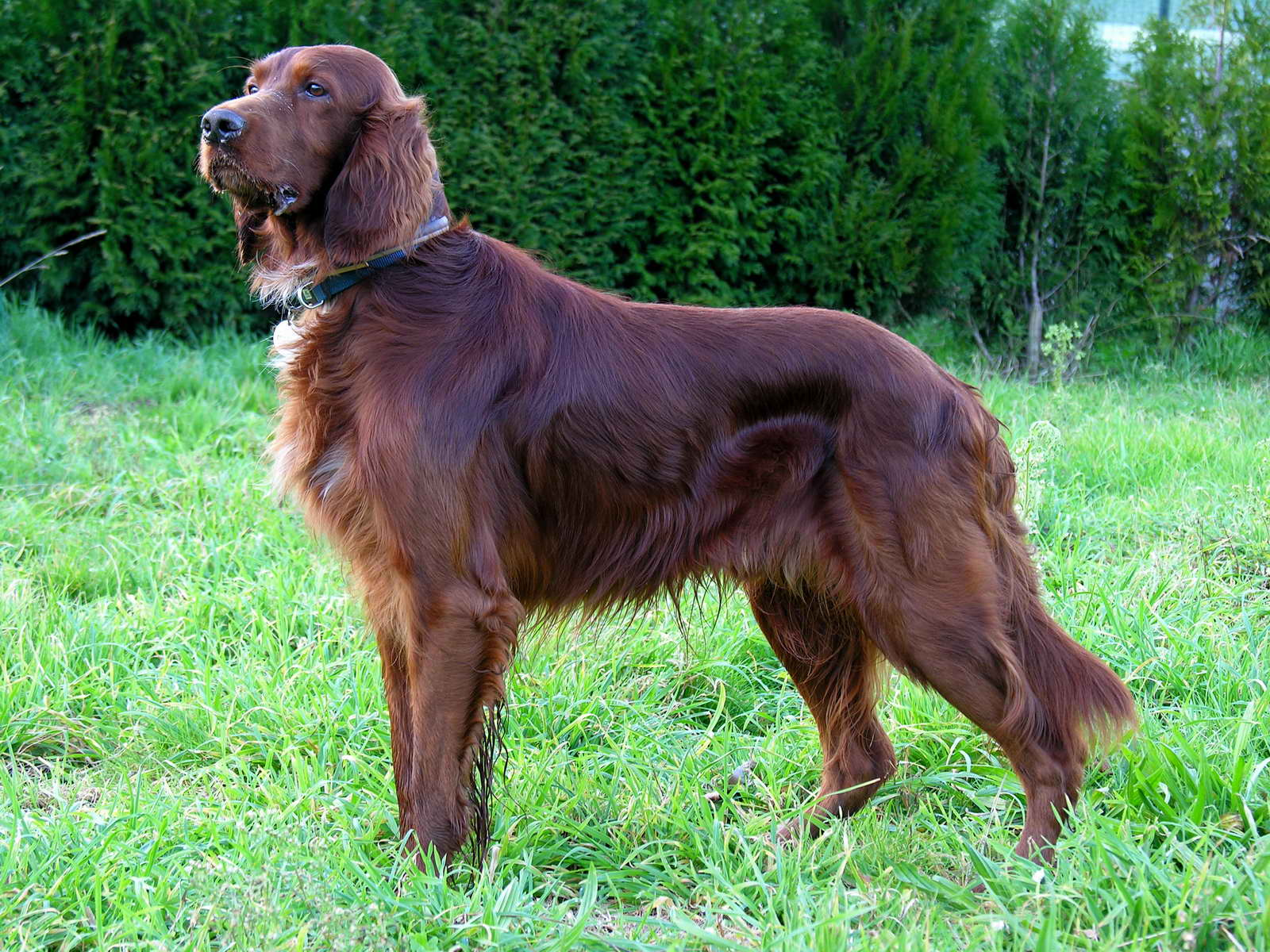
Irish Setter

Pigment Intensity for dogs who are darker than Tan (shades of gold to red) has been attributed to a mutation upstream of KITLG, in the same genes responsible for coat color in mice and hair color in humans.

The mutation is the result of a Copy Number Variant, or duplication of certain instructions within a gene, that controls the distribution of pigment in a dog's hair follicle. As such, there are no genetic markers for red pigment.

- Dogs with a higher CNV were observed to have darker, richer colors such as deep gold, red, and chestnut.
- Dogs with a lower CNV were observed to have lighter gold and orange colors.

This mutation not only effects Pheomelanin, but Eumelanin as well. This mutation does not affect all breeds the same.

=== Eumelanin vs. Phaeomelanin Pigment Switching ===
An agouti hair showing bands of eumelanin and phaeomelanin.

Several loci affect coat color by changing whether and where on a dog eumelanin (blacks-browns) or phaeomelanin (reds-yellows) are produced. Within a single hair, there can be alternating bands of eumelanin and pheomelanin. By changing that pigment switching, the result can be a hair with only eumelanin (black) or only phaeomelanin (red). Some alleles affect the entire coat; others affect pigment switching for only certain parts of the body, resulting in patterns like a darker facial mask.

There are three well studied loci: the Agouti (A), Extension (E) and Black (K) loci. Intercellular signaling pathways tell a melanocyte which type of melanin to produce. These three loci affect different parts of this cell signaling pathway.

MC1R (the E locus) is a receptor on the surface of melanocytes. When active, it causes the melanocyte to synthesize eumelanin. When MC1R is inactive, the melanocyte produces phaeomelanin. ASIP (the A locus) inactivates MC1R, thereby causing phaeomelanin synthesis. DEFB103 (the K locus) in turn prevents ASIP from inhibiting MC1R, thereby increasing eumelanin synthesis.

==== A (agouti) locus ====
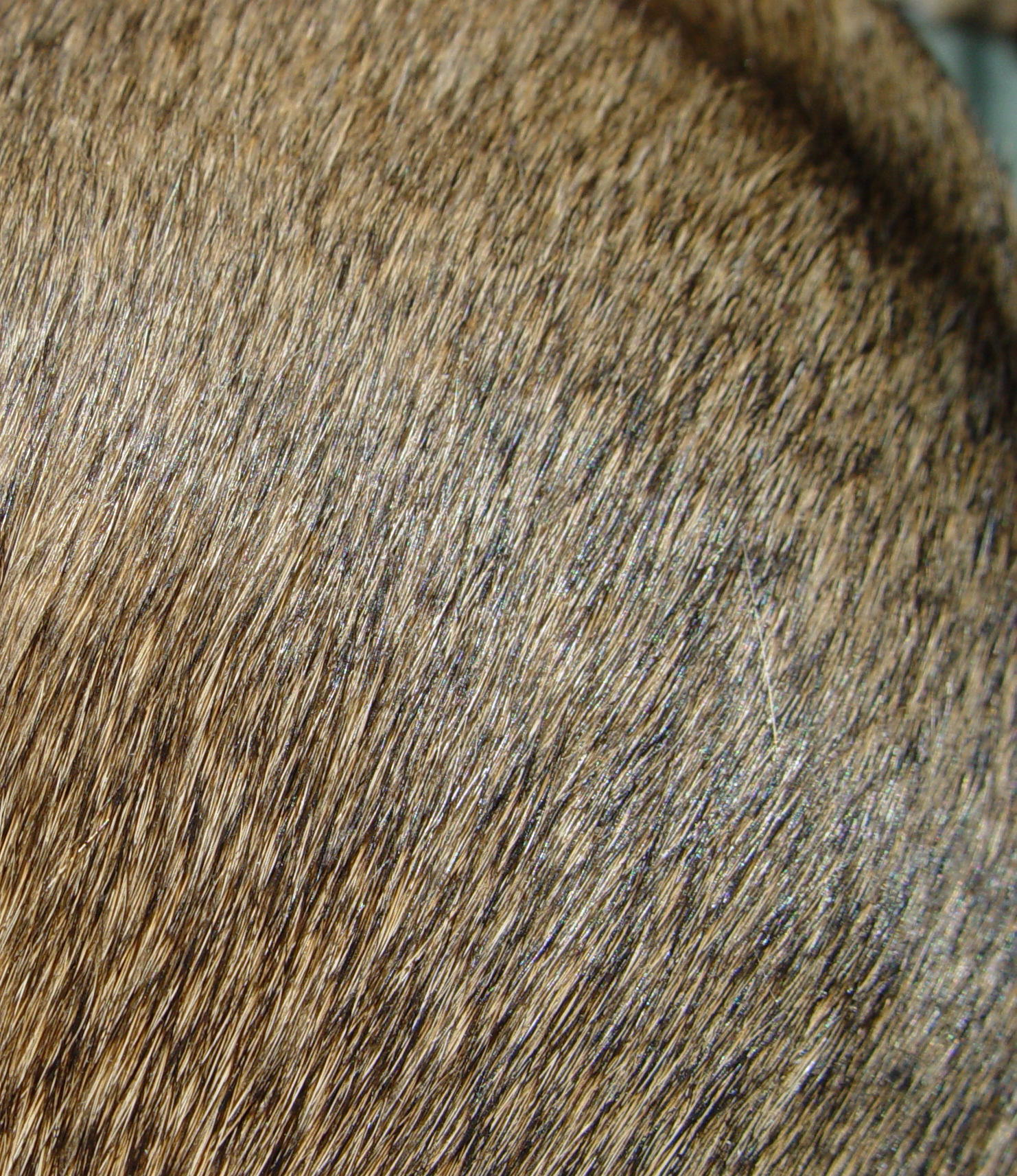
Banded hairs of a Greyhound genotype a^{w}/a^{w} or a^{w}/a^{t}

The alleles at the A locus are related to the production of agouti signalling protein (ASIP) and determine whether an animal expresses an agouti appearance, and, by controlling the distribution of pigment in individual hairs, what type of agouti. Agouti signaling protein tells cells to make phaeomelanin (red-yellow), not eumelanin (black-brown). Overactive ASIP therefore leads to yellower/redder hairs; under-active ASIP leads to darker hairs. There are several known alleles that occur at the A locus:

- A^{y} = Fawn or sable. Higher ASIP activity promotes phaeomelanin production. Tan with black whiskers and varying amounts of black-tipped and/or all-black hairs dispersed throughout. Fawn typically referring to dogs with clearer tan and sable to those with more black shading.
- a^{w} = Wild-type agouti. Each hair with 3-6 bands alternating black and tan. Dorsal hairs are darker, and ventral hairs are paler. The most common coloration in wolves. Also called wolf sable.
- a^{t} = Tan point. Black with tan patches on the face and underside - including saddle tan (tan with a black saddle or blanket). Phaeomelanin production is limited to tan points; dark portions of the dog are solid eumelanin hairs.
- a = Recessive black. Loss-of-function ASIP mutation leads to only eumelanin production. Solid black coat.
- a^{yt} = Recombinant fawn (expresses a varied phenotype depending on the breed) has been identified in numerous Tibetan Spaniels and individuals in other breeds, including the Dingo. Its hierarchical position is not yet understood.

Most texts suggest that the dominance hierarchy for the A locus alleles appears to be as follows: A^{y} > a^{w} > a^{t} > a; however, research suggests the existence of pairwise dominance/recessiveness relationships in different families and not the existence of a single hierarchy in one family.

- A^{y} is incompletely dominant to a^{t}, so that heterozygous individuals have more black sabling, especially as puppies and A^{y}a^{t} can resemble the a^{w}a^{w} phenotype. Other genes also affect how much black is in the coat.
- a^{w} is the only allele present in many Nordic spitzes, and is not present in most other breeds.
- a^{t} includes tan point and saddle tan, both of which look tan point at birth. Modifier genes in saddle tan puppies cause a gradual reduction of the black area until the saddle tan pattern is achieved.
- a is only present in a handful of breeds. Most black dogs are black due to the K locus allele K^{B} for dominant black.

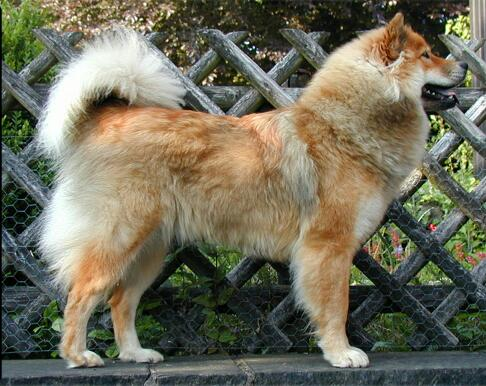
Allele A^{y}

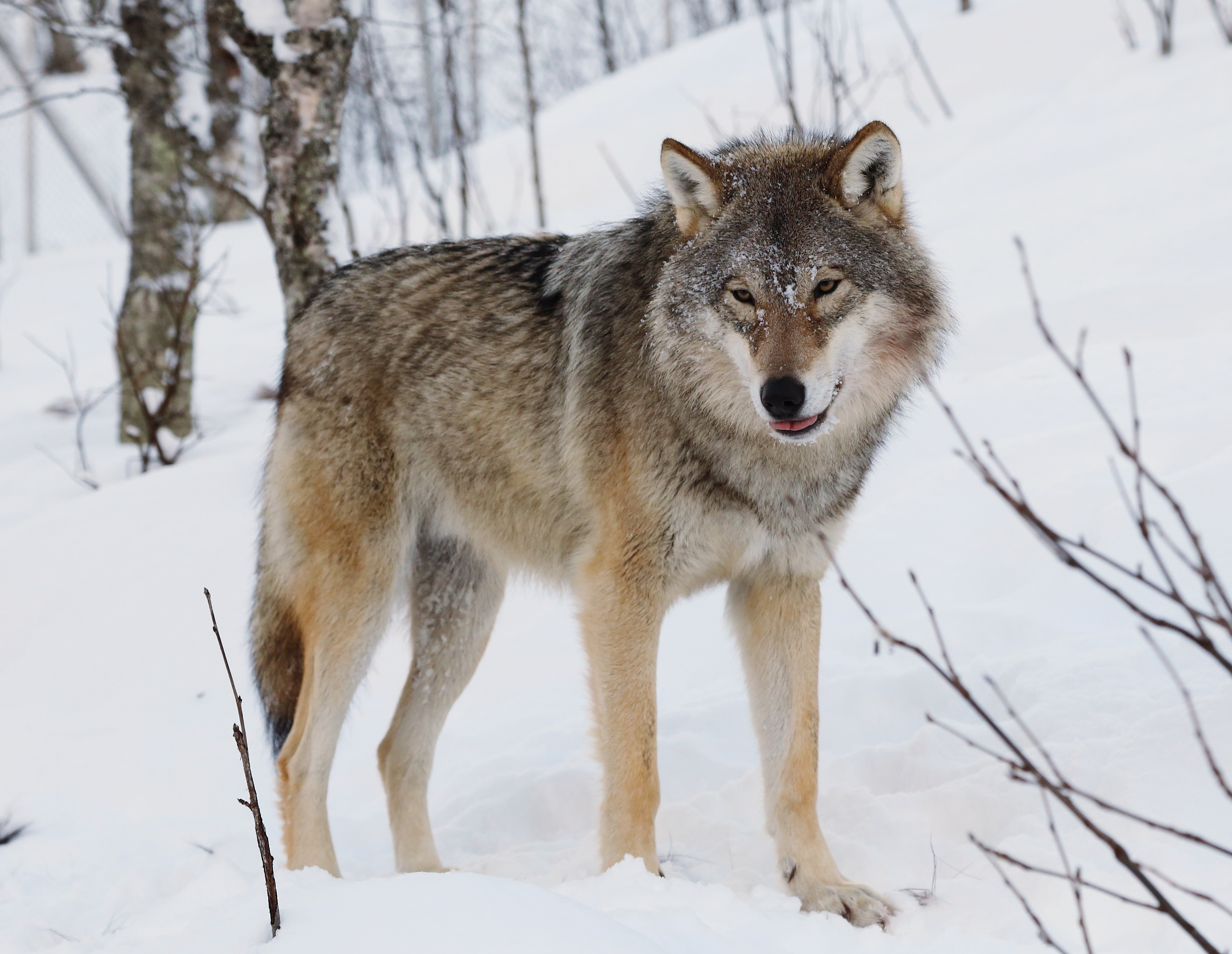
Allele a^{w}

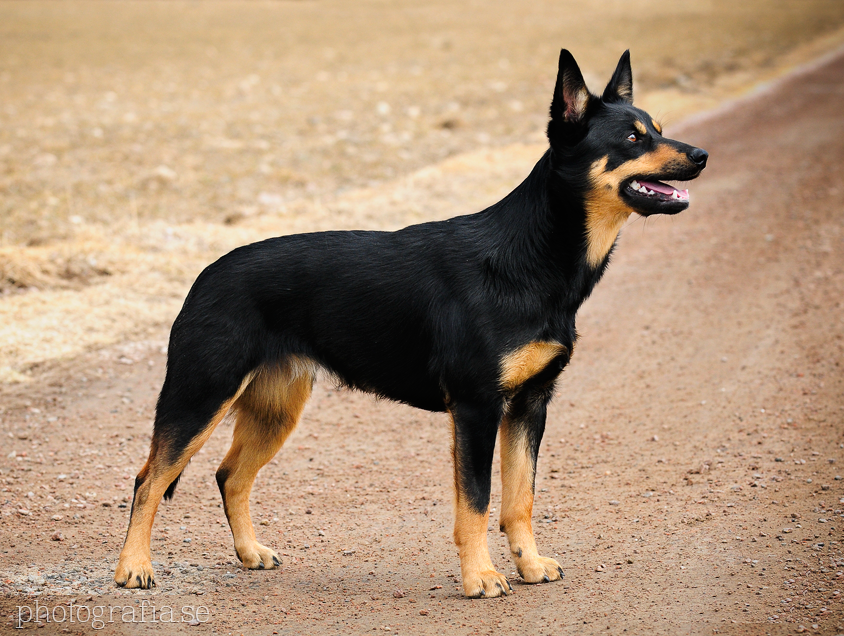
Allele a^{t}

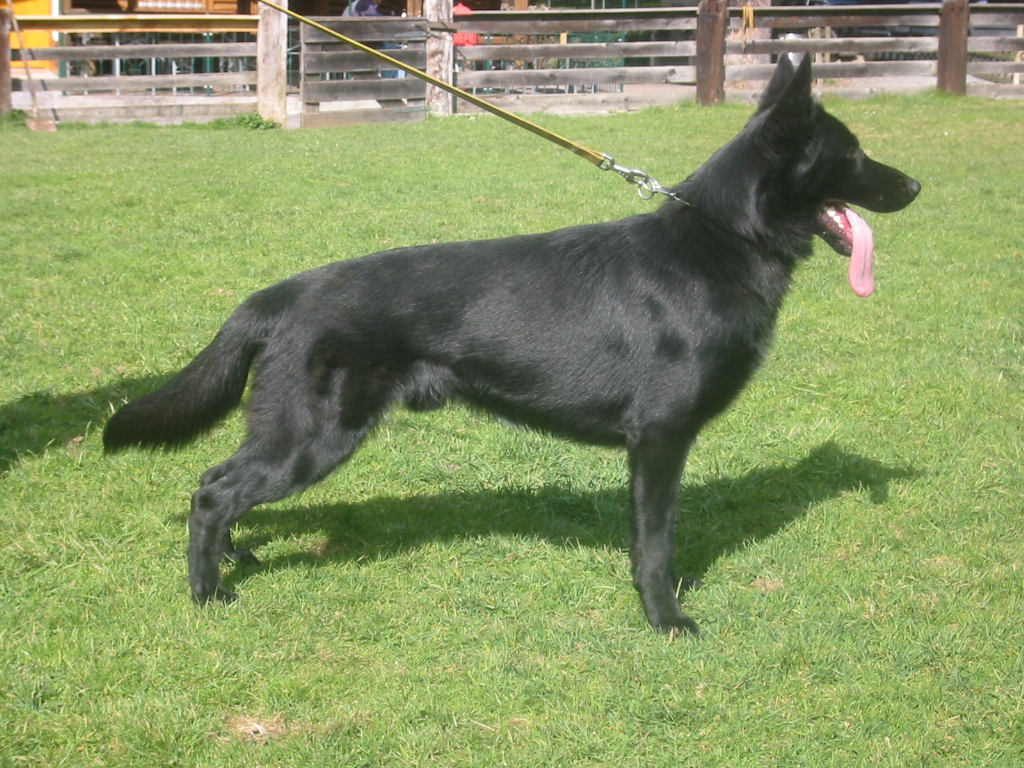
Allele a

Border Collies is one of the few breeds that lack agouti patterning, and only have sable and tan points. However, many border collies still test to have agouti genes.

==== E (extension) locus ====
The alleles at the E locus (the Melanocortin 1 Receptor gene or MC1R) determine whether an animal expresses a melanistic mask, as well as determining whether an animal can produce eumelanin in its coat. MC1R is a receptor that sits on the surface of a melanocyte; when this receptor is activated, it signals the melanocyte to make black-brown eumelanin instead of red-yellow phaeomelanin. There are several alleles that occur at the E locus:

- E^{m} = Mask. A eumelanin mask is added to the face.
- E^{G} = Grizzle (if a^{t}a^{t} and not K^{B}/-, tan underparts with a dark overlay covering the top and sides of the body, head and tail, and the outside of the limbs) - also called domino.
- E^{d} = Northern Domino (functions and appears similar to Grizzle in sighthounds) found mostly in Northern breeds such as the Siberian Husky and Finnish Lapphund, as well as Native breeds like the Chihuahua who are descended from primitive spitz breeds brought across the Bering Strait.
- E = Normal extension (pattern expressed as per alleles present at A and K loci).
- e^{h} = Cocker sable (if K^{B}/- and may require a^{t}a^{t}, tan with a dark overlay covering the top and sides of the body, head and tail, and the outside of the limbs).
- e = Recessive red. Loss-of-function of MC1R, which results in no eumelanin production in fur. With only phaeomelanin produced, coat is yellow to red. There are three loss-of-function alleles identified, all with the same phenotype.
  - e1 = most widespread loss-of-function mutation.
  - e2 = Found only in the Australian Cattle Dog, this gene creates the cream color in this breed.
  - e3 = Found only in Nordic breeds, this gene creates the white and yellow coat color.
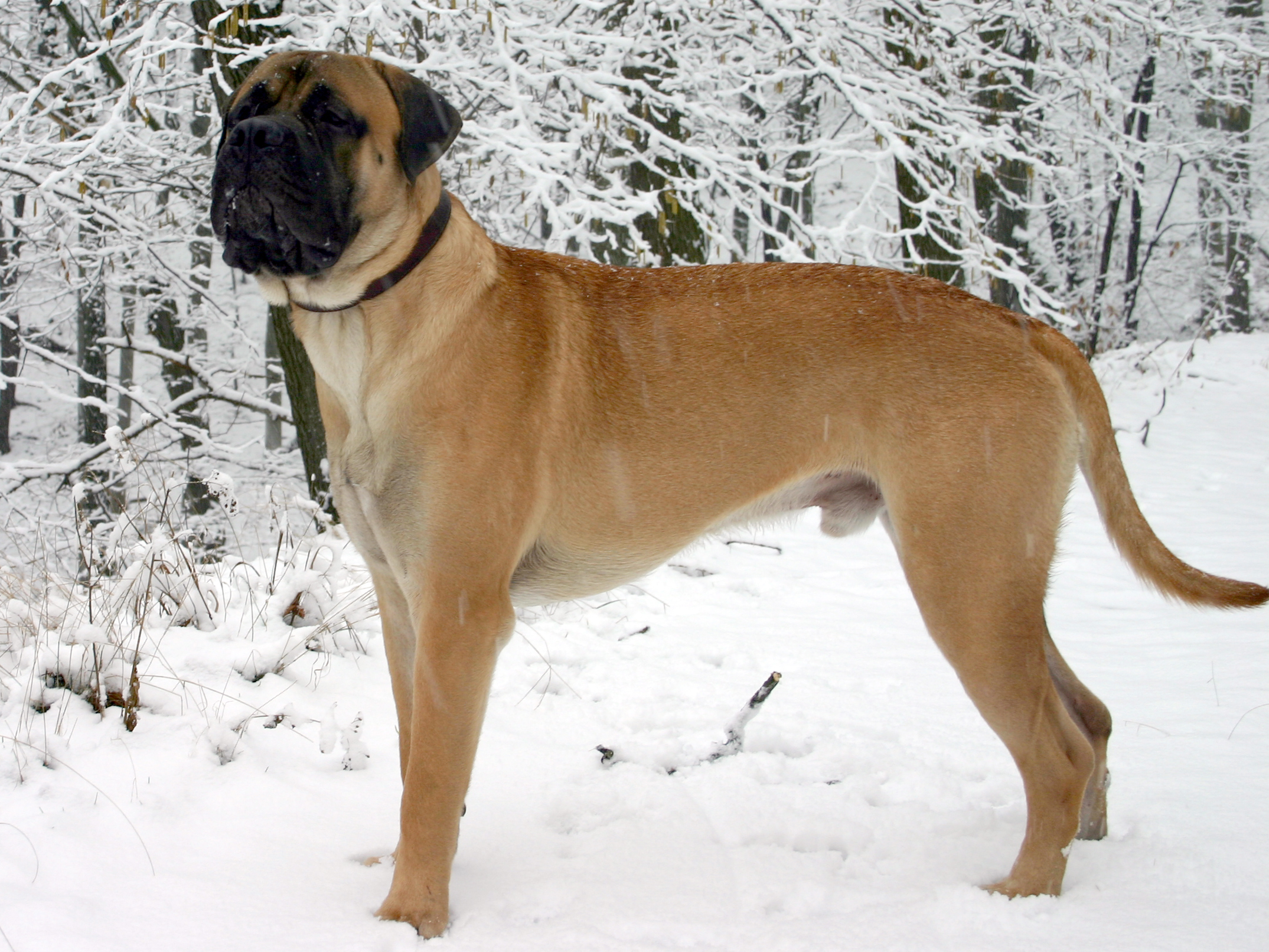
E^{m} adds the eumelanin mask. Elsewhere on the body, eumelanin vs pheomelanin is controlled by the A and K locus.

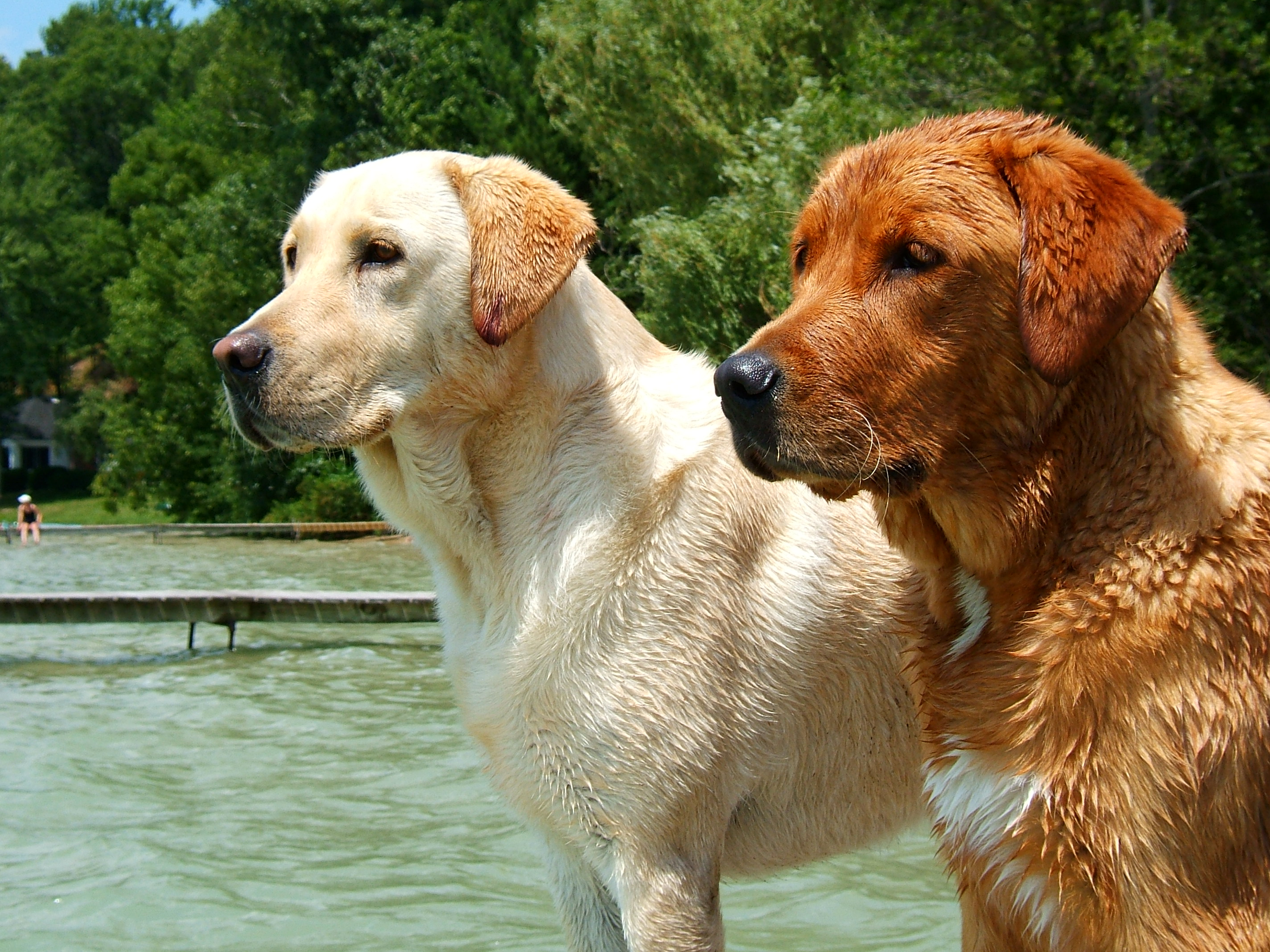
Homozygous ee causes red or yellow fur. Eumelanin can be in nose, eyelids and paw pads, but not in the fur.

The dominance hierarchy for the E locus alleles appears to be as follows: E^{m} > E^{G/d} > E > e^{h} > e.

- E allows normal expression of eumelanin and/or phaeomelanin according to the alleles present at the A and K loci.
- E^{m} allows similar pattern expression to E except any tan (phaeomelanin) areas on the mask area are replaced with eumelanin (black/etc.) The mask can vary from the muzzle, to the face and ears, to a larger area with shading on the front and sides as in the Belgian Tervuren. The mask E^{m} is unaffected by the greying gene G and will remain dark in a G/- animal while the rest of the dog pales, such as in Kerry Blue Terriers. Some puppies are born with a mask which fades away within a few weeks of birth: these puppies do not have the E^{m} allele and their temporary mask is due to sabling.
- An animal that is homozygous for e will express a red to yellow coat regardless of most alleles at other loci. Eumelanin is inhibited, so there can be no black hairs anywhere, even the whiskers. Pigment on the nose leather can be unaffected.
- The Grizzle allele has been studied only in Salukis and Afghan Hounds, the latter in which it is referred to as "Domino", but also occurs in the Borzoi. Its placement in the dominance hierarchy has not been solidified. Black with fawn-tan points (a^{t}/a^{t} E/-) is instead dark-sable with extended clear-tan points (a^{t}/a^{t} E^{G}/-). Brindle affects fawn and sable areas, resulting in black with bridled-tan points (a^{t}/a^{t} E/- K^{br}/-) or brindle with clear-tan points (a^{t}/a^{t} E^{G}/- K^{br}/-). Expression of E^{G} is dependent upon the animal being homozygous for a^{t} and not possessing E^{m} or K^{B}. E^{G} is theorized to have no effect on the phenotype of non-at/- nor K^{B} dogs and to be allelic to E^{m} and e.
- Little information exists regarding the E^{d} allele. In behavior and appearance it almost mimics the Grizzle allele found in Sighthounds, however it is not the same mutation. Domino animals of this type will either have two copies of the mutation or have a single copy paired with e.
- The e^{h} sable extension allele has been studied only in English Cocker Spaniels and produces sable in the presence of dominant black K^{B} and tan point a^{t}/a^{t}. Its expression is dependent upon the animal not possessing E^{m} nor E nor being homozygous for e. e^{h} is theorized to be on the E locus and to have no effect on k^{y}/k^{y} dogs. All cocker spaniels are homozygous for a^{t}, so it is unknown how the gene may function in the presence of other A-series alleles.

==== K (dominant black) locus ====
The alleles at the K locus (the β-Defensin 103 gene or DEFB103) determine the coloring pattern of an animal's coat. There are three known alleles that occur at the K locus:

- K^{B} = Dominant black (black)
- k^{br} = Brindle (black stripes added to tan areas)
- k^{y} = Phaeomelanin permitted (pattern expressed as per alleles present at A and E loci)

The dominance hierarchy for the K locus alleles appears to be as follows: K^{B} > k^{br} > k^{y}.

- K^{B} causes a solid eumelanin coat (black, brown, grey or taupe) except when combined with e/e (tan or white), E^{h}/- (Cocker sable) or E^{m}/- G/- and appropriate coat type (light eumelanin with dark eumelanin mask)
- k^{br} causes the addition of eumelanin stripes to all tan areas of a dog except when combined with e/e (no effect) or E^{G}/- a^{t}a^{t} non-K^{B}/- (eumelanin and sabled areas become striped, tan areas remain tan)
- k^{y} is wild-type allowing full expression of other genes.

==== Interactions of some pigment-switching genes ====
Alleles at the Agouti (A), Extension (E) and Black (K) loci interact to affect coat color and pattern. Below is a table of some of the more common alleles and their interactions:

Brindle interactions		Fawn or sable A^{y}/-	Wolf sable/Agouti a^{w}/a^{w}, a^{w}/a^{t} or a^{w}/a	Tan point a^{t}/a^{t} or a^{t}/a	Rec. black a/a
Dom. black K^{B}/-	Mask; E^{m}/-	black (with mask)*	black (with mask)*	black (with mask)*	black (with mask)*
Dom. black K^{B}/-	Wildtype E E/E or E/e	black	black	black	black
Dom. black K^{B}/-	Recessive red e/e	yellow-red	yellow-red	yellow-red	yellow-red
Brindle; K^{br}/K^{br} or K^{br}/k^{y}	Mask; E^{m}/-	brindle with mask	brindle with mask	black & brindled tan with mask	black (with mask)*
Brindle; K^{br}/K^{br} or K^{br}/k^{y}	Wildtype E E/E or E/e	brindle	brindle	black & brindled tan	black
Brindle; K^{br}/K^{br} or K^{br}/k^{y}	Recessive red e/e	yellow-red	yellow-red	yellow-red	yellow-red
Wildtype K k^{y}/k^{y}	Mask; E^{m}/-	fawn or sable with mask	wolf sable with mask	black & tan with mask	black (with mask)*
Wildtype K k^{y}/k^{y}	Wildtype E E/E or E/e	fawn or sable	wolf sable	black & tan	black
Wildtype K k^{y}/k^{y}	Recessive red e/e	yellow-red	yellow-red	yellow-red	yellow-red

Below is a table of less-common alleles from the Extension locus:

Interactions of less common Extension locus alleles		Fawn or sable A^{y}/-	Wolf sable a^{w}/a^{w}, a^{w}/a^{t} or a^{w}/a	Tan point a^{t}/a^{t} or a^{t}/a	Rec. black a/a
Dom. black K^{B}/-	Cocker sable^{†} e^{h}/e^{h} or e^{h}/e	?	?	cocker sable	?
Brindle; K^{br}/K^{br} or K^{br}/k^{y}	Grizzle/domino^{†} E^{G}/E^{G}, E^{G}/E or E^{G}/e	brindle (Afghan)	n/a	brindle with clear-tan points (Afghan)	n/a
Wildtype K k^{y}/k^{y}	Grizzle/domino^{†} E^{G}/E^{G}, E^{G}/E or E^{G}/e	fawn	n/a	grizzle	n/a
^{†} e^{h} and E^{G} are only included in the table where their interactions are known.

== Patches and White Markings ==
The Merle (M), Harlequin (H), and Spotting (S) loci contribute to patching, spotting, and white markings. Alleles present at the Merle (M) and Harlequin (H) loci cause patchy reduction of melanin to half (merle), zero (harlequin) or both (double merle). Alleles present at the Spotting (S), Ticking (T) and Flecking (F) loci determine white markings.

=== M (merle) locus ===
A merle dog (M/m)

The alleles at the M locus (the silver locus protein homolog gene or SILV, aka premelanosome protein gene or PMEL) determine whether an animal expresses a merle pattern to its coat. There are two alleles that occur at the M locus:

- M = Merle (patches of full colour and reduced colour)
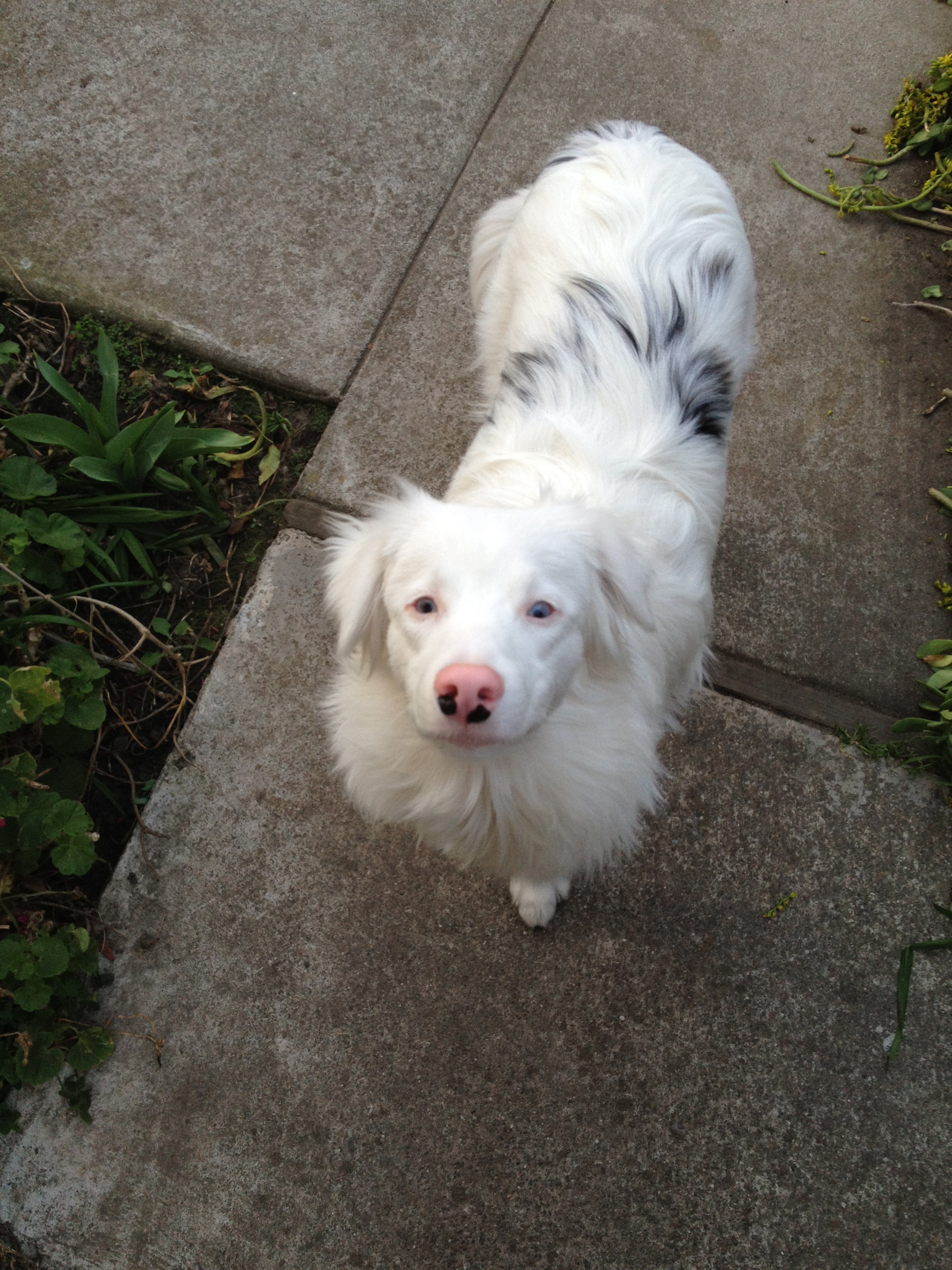
- A double merle dog, M/M. This has caused deafness.
  m = Non-merle (normal expression)

M and m show a relationship of both co-dominance and no dominance.

- On heterozygous M/m merles, black is reduced to silver on ~50% of the animal in semi-random patches with rough edges like torn paper. The fraction of the dog covered by merle patches is random such that some animals may be predominantly black and others predominantly silver. The merle gene is "faulty" with many merle animals having one odd patch of a third shade of grey, brown or tan.
- On homozygous M/M "double merles", black is replaced with ~25% black, ~50% silver and ~25% white, again with random variation, such that some animals have more black or more white.
- Eumelanin (black/etc.) is significantly reduced by M/m, but phaeomelanin is barely affected such that there will be little to no evidence of the merle gene on any tan areas or on an e/e dog. However, the white patches caused by M/M affect both pigments equally, such that a fawn double merle would be, on average, ~75% tan and ~25% white.

==== Health Effects of Merle Gene ====
The merle gene also affects the skin, eye colour, eyesight and development of the eye and inner ear. Merle M/m puppies develop their skin pigmentation (nose, paws, belly) with speckled-edged progression, equally evident in e/e merles except when extensive white markings cause pink skin to remain in these areas. Blue and part-blue eyes are common.

Both heterozygosity and homozygosity of the merle gene (i.e., M/m and M/M) are linked to a range of auditory and ophthalmologic abnormalities. Most M/m merles have normal-sized eyes and acceptably functional eyesight and hearing; most M/M double merles suffer from microphthalmia and/or partial to complete deafness.

==== Merle allele variants ====
There are several other alleles at the M locus that can produce variants on the "typical" merle coat.

- Cryptic merle (Mc and Mc+)

One of the variation of M allele is Mc and Mc+. Although just one copy of Mc is not long enough to make visible change on coats, the combination of Mc or more than two copies of Mc would lead to odd shades of black/liver.

- Atypical merle (Ma and Ma+)

Another type of variation of M allele is Ma and Ma+. This kinds of allele would lead to visibly merle-patterned dog if there are two copies of Ma. If a dog with the atypical merle allele is bred to dog with a longer merle allele, the double merle health problems might occur.

=== H (harlequin) locus ===
DNA studies have isolated a missense mutation in the 20S proteasome β2 subunit at the H locus. The H locus is a modifier locus (of the M locus) and the alleles at the H locus will determine if an animal expresses a harlequin vs merle pattern. There are two alleles that occur at the H locus:

- H = Harlequin (if M/-, patches of full colour and white)
- h = Non-harlequin (if M/-, normal expression of merle)

H/h heterozygotes are harlequin and h/h homozygotes are non-harlequin. Breeding data suggests that homozygous H/H is embryonic lethal and that therefore all harlequins are H/h.

- The Harlequin allele is specific to Great Danes. Harlequin dogs (H/h M/m) have the same pattern of patches as merle (h/h M/m) dogs, but the patches are white and harlequin affects eumelanin and phaeomelanin equally. H has no effect on non-merle m/m dogs.

=== S (spotting) locus ===
The alleles at the S locus (the microphthalmia-associated transcription factor gene or MITF) determine the degree and distribution of white spotting on an animal's coat. There is disagreement as to the number of alleles that occur at the S locus, with researchers sometimes postulating a conservative two or, commonly, four alleles. The alleles postulated are:

- S = Solid color/no white (very small areas of white may still appear; a diamond or medallion on the chest, a few toe tips/toes, or a tail tip)
- s^{i} = Irish-spotting (white on muzzle, forehead, feet, legs, chest, neck and tail)
- s^{p} = Piebald (varies from coloured with Irish spotting plus at least one white marking on the top or sides of the body or hips, to mostly white which generally retains patches of colour around the eyes, ears and tail base)
- s^{w} = Extreme piebald spotting (extremely large areas of white, almost completely white)

In 2014, a study found that a combination of simple repeat polymorphism in the MITF-M Promoter and a SINE insertion is a key regulator of white spotting and that white color had been selected for by humans to differentiate dogs from their wild counterparts.

Based on this research the degree of White Spotting is dependent on the Promoter Length (Lp) to produce less or more color. A shorter Lp creates less white (Solid Colored and Residual White dogs) while a longer Lp creates more white (Irish Spotting and Piebald).

What separates Piebald from Irish White and Solid is the presence of a SINE insertion (Short Interspersed Element) in the S locus genes that changes the normal DNA production. The result is Piebald and Extreme Piebald. The only difference between the two recognized forms of Piebald is the length of the Lp.

Because of this variability, a dog's Phenotype will not always match their Genotype. The Beagle for example is fixed for spsp Piebald, yet there are Beagles with very little white on them, or Beagles that are mostly white. What makes them Piebald is the SINE Insertion, but the Lp length is what changes how their patterns are expressed.

- White spotting can cause blue eyes, microphthalmia, blindness and deafness; however, because pigmentation is generally retained around the eye/ear area, this is rare except in SINE White dogs (Piebald) which can sometimes lose pigment in those areas during fetal development.
- Some breeds like the Boston Terrier, Australian Shepherd, and Rough Collie have a naturally longer Lp and are considered "Fixed for White". This means even if they are genetically SS for Solid Color, they will still show White Spotting.

It is thought that the spotting that occurs in Dalmatians is the result of the interaction of three loci (the S locus, the T locus and F locus) giving them a unique spotting pattern not found in any other breed.

=== Albinism ===
==== C (colored) locus ====
People have postulated several alleles at the C locus and suggested some/all determine the degree to which an animal expresses phaeomelanin, a red-brown protein related to the production of melanin, in its coat and skin. Five alleles have been theorised to occur at the C locus:

- C = Full color (animal expresses phaeomelanin)
- c^{ch} = Chinchilla (partial inhibition of phaeomelanin resulting in decreased red pigment)
- c^{e} = Extreme dilution (inhibition of phaeomelanin resulting in extremely reduced red pigment)
- c^{b}, c^{p} = Blue-eyed albino/Platinum (almost total inhibition of phaeomelanin resulting in near albino appearance)
- c^{a} = Albino (complete inhibition of phaeomelanin production, resulting in complete inhibition of melanin production)

However, based on a 2014 publication about albinism in the Doberman Pinscher and later in other small breeds, the discovery was made that multiple alleles in the C locus are highly unlikely, and that all dogs are homozygous for Normal Color production, excluding dogs who carry albinism.

== Theoretical genes for color and pattern ==
There are additional theoretical loci thought to be associated with coat color in dogs. DNA studies are yet to confirm the existence of these genes or alleles but their existence is theorised based on breeding data:

=== F (flecking) locus ===
The alleles at the theoretical F locus are thought to determine whether an animal displays small, isolated regions of white in otherwise pigmented regions (not apparent on white animals). Two alleles are theorised to occur at the F locus:

- F = Flecked
- f = Not flecked

(See ticking below, which may be another name for the flecking described here)

It is thought that F is dominant to f.

=== G (progressive greying) locus ===
The alleles at the theoretical G locus are thought to determine if progressive greying of the animal's coat will occur. Two alleles are theorised to occur at the G locus:

- G = Progressive greying (melanin lost from hairs over time)
- g = No progressive greying

It is thought that G is dominant to g.

- The greying gene affects both eumelanin, and to a lesser extent phaeomelanin. In the presence of E^{m}/- the eumelanin mask will be unaffected and remain dark. Grey dogs are born fully coloured and develop the greying effect over several months. New hairs are grown fully coloured but their colour fades over time towards white. Greying is most evident in continuous-growing coats (long + wire + curly) as individual hairs remain on the dog long enough for the colour to be lost. In short-haired dogs, hairs are shed out and re-grown before the colour has a chance to change.
- Premature greying, in which the face/etc. greys at a young age is not caused by G and has not been proven to be genetic.

=== T (ticking) locus ===
The alleles at the theoretical T locus are thought to determine whether an animal displays small, isolated regions of pigment in otherwise s-spotted white regions. Two alleles are theorised to occur at the T locus:

- T = Ticked
- t = Not ticked

It is thought that T is dominant to t. Ticking may be caused by several genes rather than just one. Patterns of medium-sized individual spots, smaller individual spots, and tiny spots that completely cover all white areas leaving a roan-like or merle-like appearance (reserving the term large spots for the variation exclusive to the Dalmatian) can each occur separately or in any combination.

- The effect of the ticking gene(s) is to add back little coloured spots to areas made white by piebald spotting (-/s) or the limited white markings of S/S animals. It does not affect white areas that were caused by a/a e/e or M/M or M/m H/h. The colour of the tick marks will be as expected or one shade darker. Tick marks are semi-random, so that they vary from one dog to the next and can overlap, but are generally present on the lower legs and heavily present on the nose.

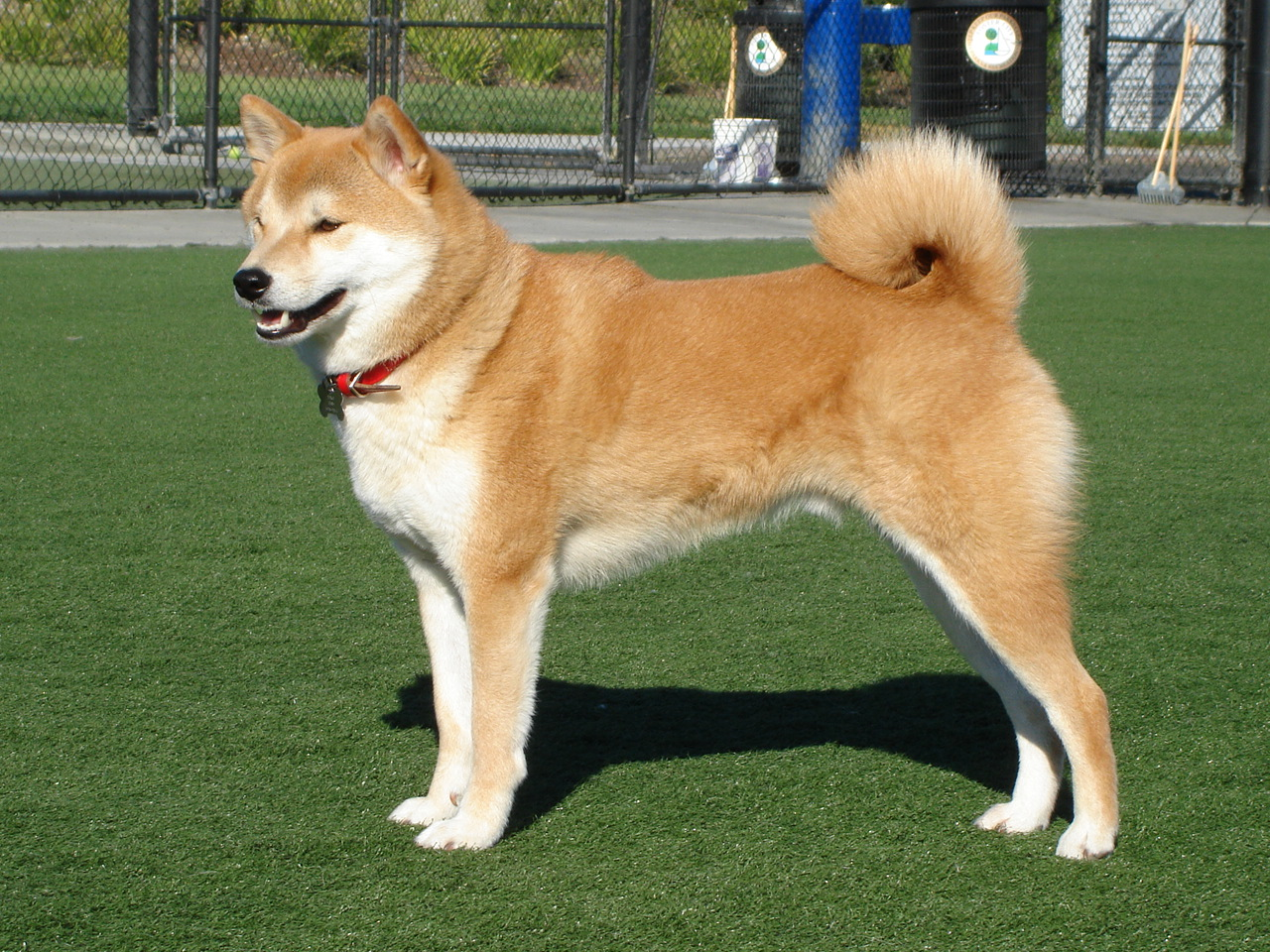
Shiba Inu displaying urajiro pattern.

=== U (urajiro) locus ===
The alleles at the theoretical U locus are thought to limit phaeomelanin production on the cheeks and underside. Two alleles are theorized to occur at the U locus:

- U = Urajiro
- u = Not urajiro

It is thought that U is recessive to u but due to lack of genetic studies these assumptions have only been made through visual assessment. The urajiro pattern is expressed in the tan (phaeomelanin) areas of any dog and does not effect black (eumelanin) pigment.

== Miscolours in dog breeds ==
Miscolours occur quite rarely in dog breeds, because genetic carriers of the recessive alleles causing fur colours that don't correspond to the breed standard are very rare in the gene pool of a breed and there is an extremely low probability that one carrier will be mated with another. In case two carriers have offspring, according to the law of segregation an average of 25% of the puppies are homozygous and express the off-colour in the phenotype, 50% become carriers and 25% are homozygous for the standard colour. Usually off-coloured individuals are excluded from breeding, but that doesn't stop the inheritance of the recessive allele from carriers mated with standard-coloured dogs to new carriers.

In the breed Boxer large white markings in heterozygous carriers with genotype S s^{i} or S s^{w} belong to the standard colours, therefore extreme white Boxers are born regularly, some of them with health problems. The cream-white colour of the Shiba Inu is not caused by any spotting gene but by strong dilution of pheomelanin. Melanocytes are present in the whole skin and in the embryonic tissue for the auditory organs and eyes, therefore this colour is not associated with any health issues.

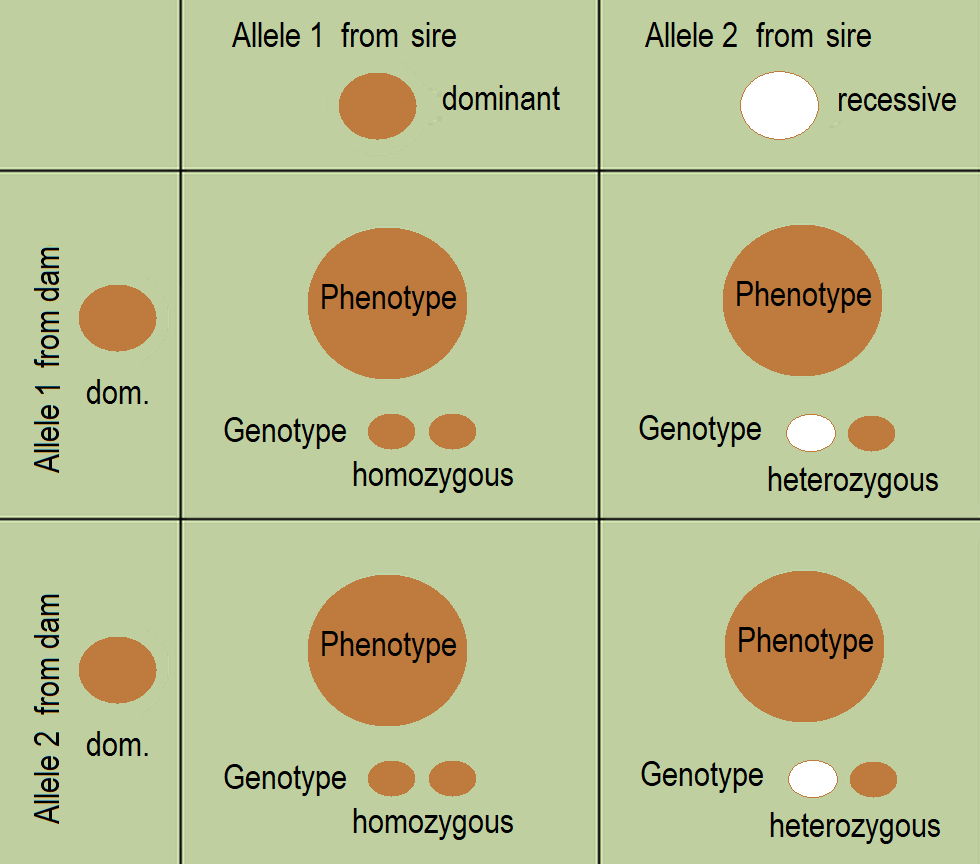
Punnett square: Inheritance with one carrier of a recessive gene

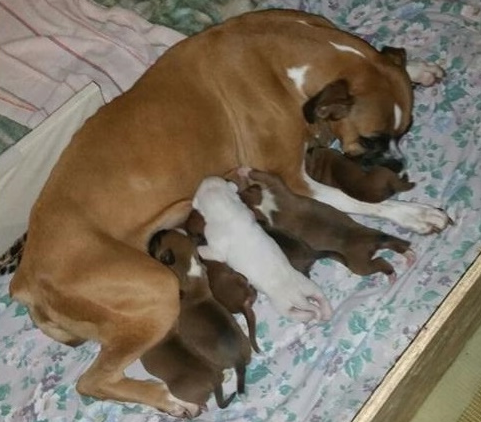
Litter of a Boxer Genotype S s^{i} mated with another s^{i} carrier.

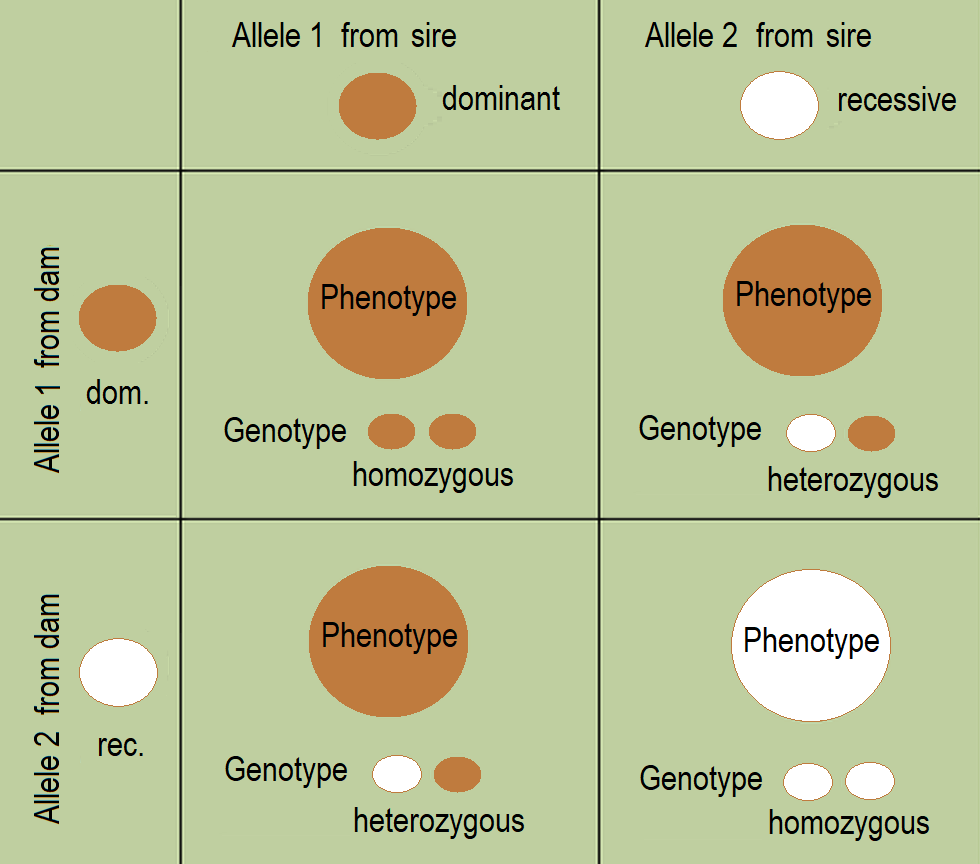
Punnett square: Inheritance with two genetic carriers

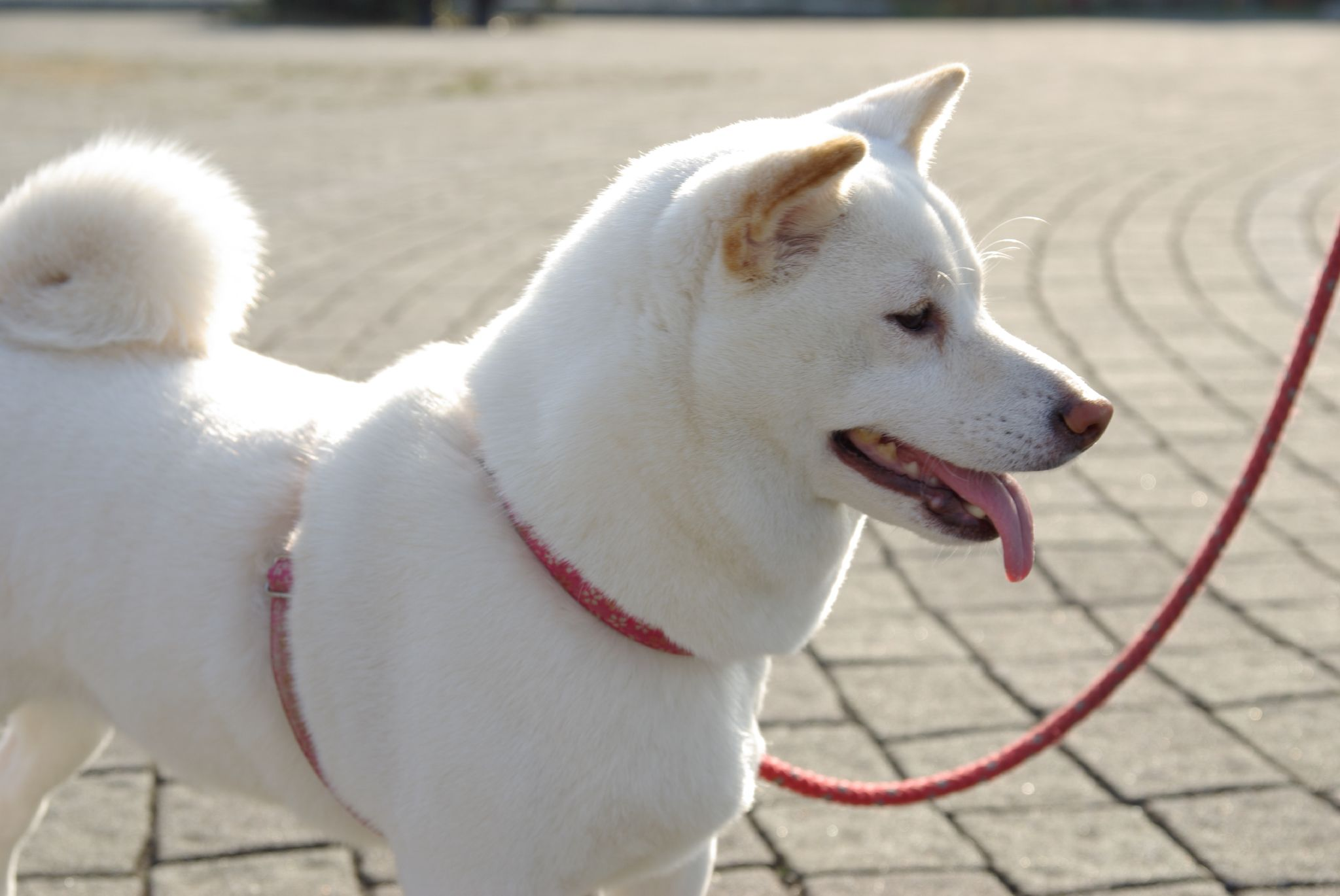
Shiba Inu: According to the AKC, cream-white is nonstandard albeit accepted by the British Kennel Club.

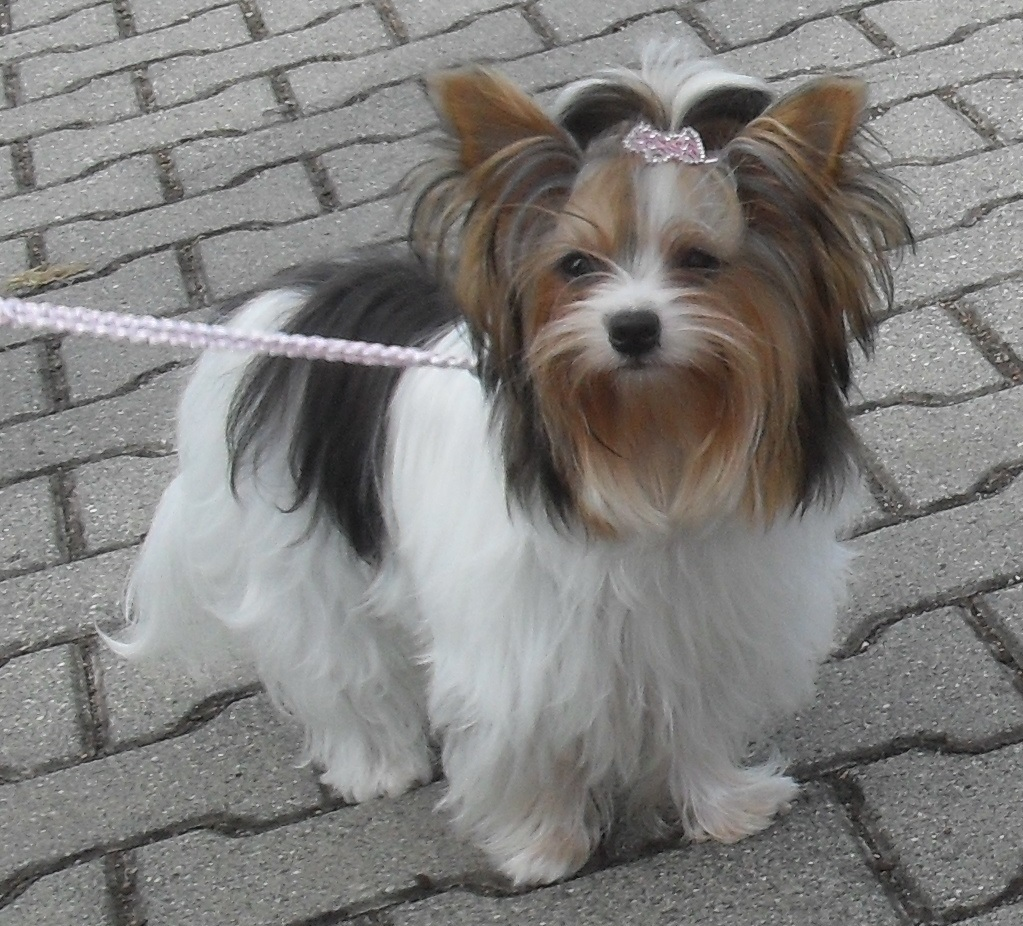
For normal Yorkshire Terriers Piebald spotting s^{p} s^{p} is not allowed. Tricolor Yorkies became a separate breed.

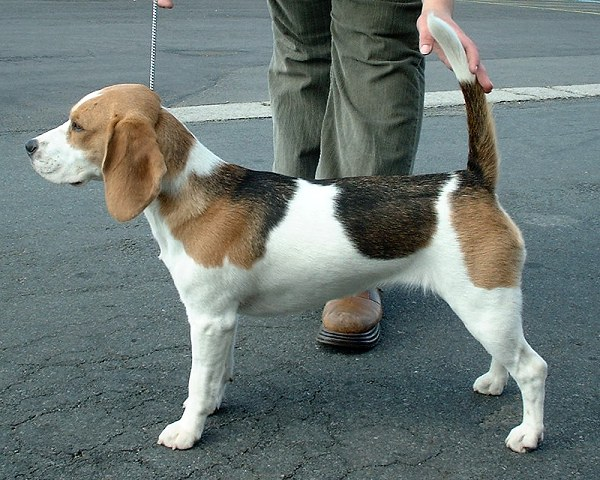
For the Beagle tricolor Genotype s^{p} s^{p} is the first colour in the breed standard.

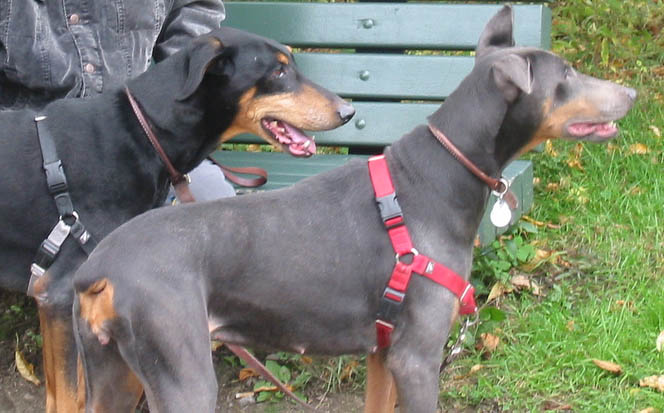
Blue Dobermann

The occurrence of a dominant coat colour gene not belonging to the standard colours is a suspicion for crossbreeding with another breed. For example, the dilute gen D in the suddenly appeared variety "silver coloured" Labrador Retriever might probably come from a Weimaraner. The same applies for Dobermann Pinschers suffering from Blue dog syndrome.

=== Somatic Mutations and Chimera ===
Somatic mutation, a mutation that can occur in body cells after formation of the embryo, can be passed on to next generations. A pigment somatic mutation can cause patches of different colors (mosaicism) to appear in the dog's coat.

== Genes associated with hair length, growth and texture ==
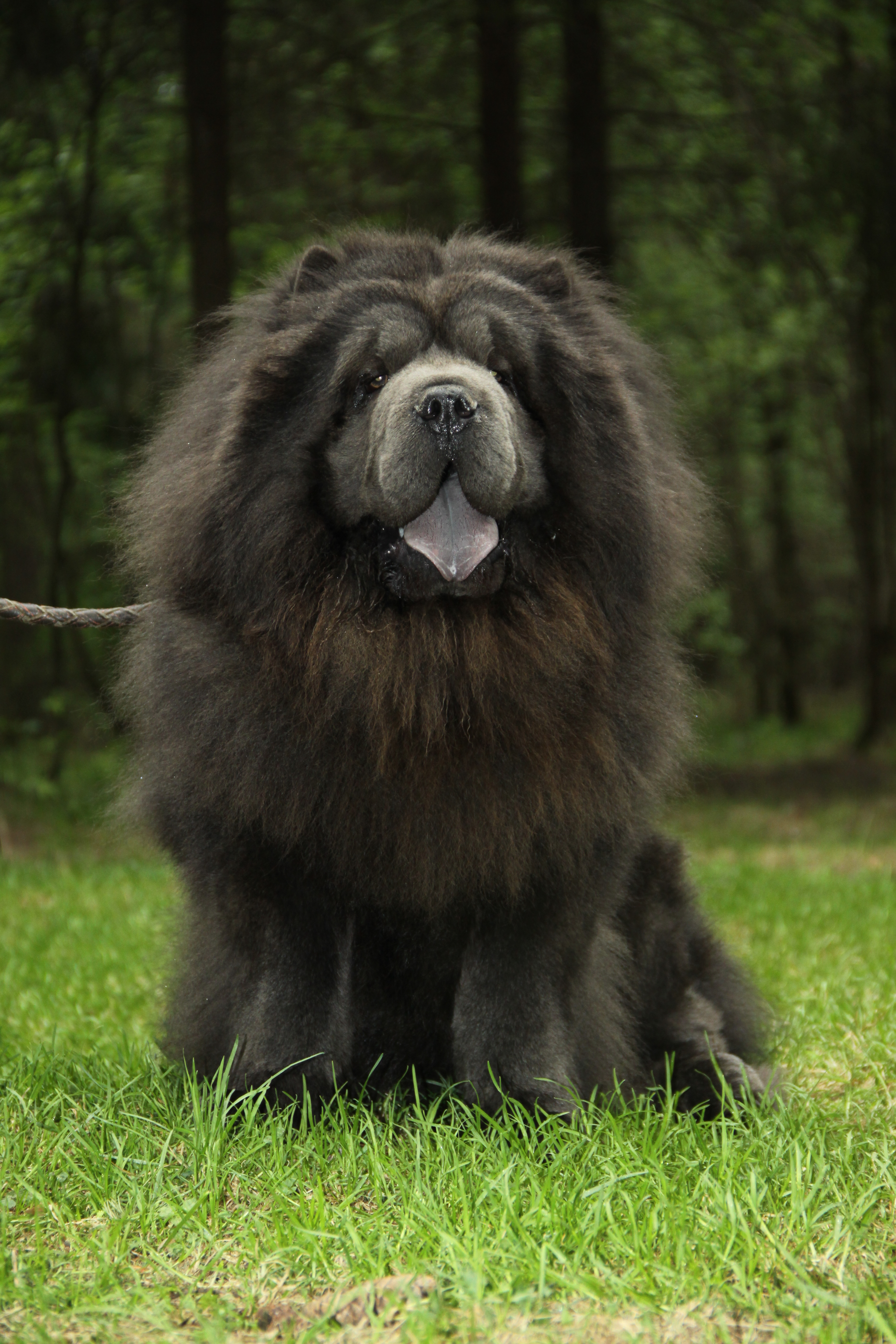
Black-coated Chow-Chow whose long hair has faded due to exposure to the elements.

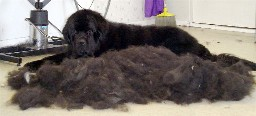
Newfoundland lying next to its combed-out seasonal undercoat.

Every hair in the dog coat grows from a hair follicle, which has a three phase cycle, as in most other mammals. These phases are:

- anagen, growth of normal hair;
- catagen, growth slows, and hair shaft thins; and
- telogen, hair growth stops, the follicle rests, and the old hair falls off—is shed. At the end of the telogen phase, the follicle begins the cycle again.

Most dogs have a double coat, each hair follicle containing 1-2 primary hairs and several secondary hairs. The primary hairs are longer, thicker and stiffer, and called guard hairs or outer coat. Each follicle also holds a variety of silky- to wiry-textured secondary hairs (undercoat) all of which are wavy, and smaller and softer than the primary hair. The ratio of primary to secondary hairs varies at least six-fold, and varies between dogs according to coat type, and on the same dog in accordance with seasonal and other hormonal influences. Puppies are born with a single coat, with more hair follicles per unit area, but each hair follicle contains only a single hair of fine, silky texture. Development of the adult coat begins around 3 months of age, and is completed around 12 months.

Research indicates that the majority of variation in coat growth pattern, length and curl can be attributed to mutations in four genes, the R-spondin-2 gene or RSPO2, the fibroblast growth factor-5 gene or FGF5, the keratin-71 gene or KRT71 and the melanocortin 5 receptor gene (MC5R). The wild-type coat in dogs is short, double and straight.

=== L (length) locus ===
The alleles at the L locus (the fibroblast growth factor-5 gene or FGF5) determine the length of the animal's coat. There are two known alleles that occur at the L locus:

- L = Short coat
- l = Long coat

L is dominant to l. A long coat is demonstrated when a dog has pair of recessive l alleles at this locus. The dominance of L > l is incomplete, and L/l dogs have a small but noticeable increase in length and finer texture than closely related L/L individuals. However, between breeds there is significant overlap between the shortest L/L and the longest L/l phenotypes. In certain breeds (German Shepherd, Alaskan Malamute, Cardigan Welsh Corgi), the coat is often of medium length and many dogs of these breeds are also heterozygous at the L locus (L/l).

=== W (wired) locus ===
Wire hair.

The alleles at the W locus (the R-spondin-2 gene or RSPO2) determine the coarseness and the presence of "facial furnishings" (e.g. beard, moustache, eyebrows). There are two known alleles that occur at the W locus:

- W = Wire (hair is coarse and facial furnishings present)
- w = Non-wire (hair is not coarse and facial furnishings are not present)

Curly hair.

W is dominant to w, but the dominance of W > w is incomplete. W/W dogs have coarse hair, prominent furnishings and greatly-reduced shedding. W/w dogs have the harsh wire texture, but decreased furnishings, and overall coat length and shedding similar to non-wire animals.

Animals that are homozygous for long coat (i.e., l/l) and possess at least one copy of W will have long, soft coats with furnishings, rather than wiry coats.

Examples of such coats include the Korthals Griffon, and possibly the Irish Wolfhound.

=== R (curl) locus ===
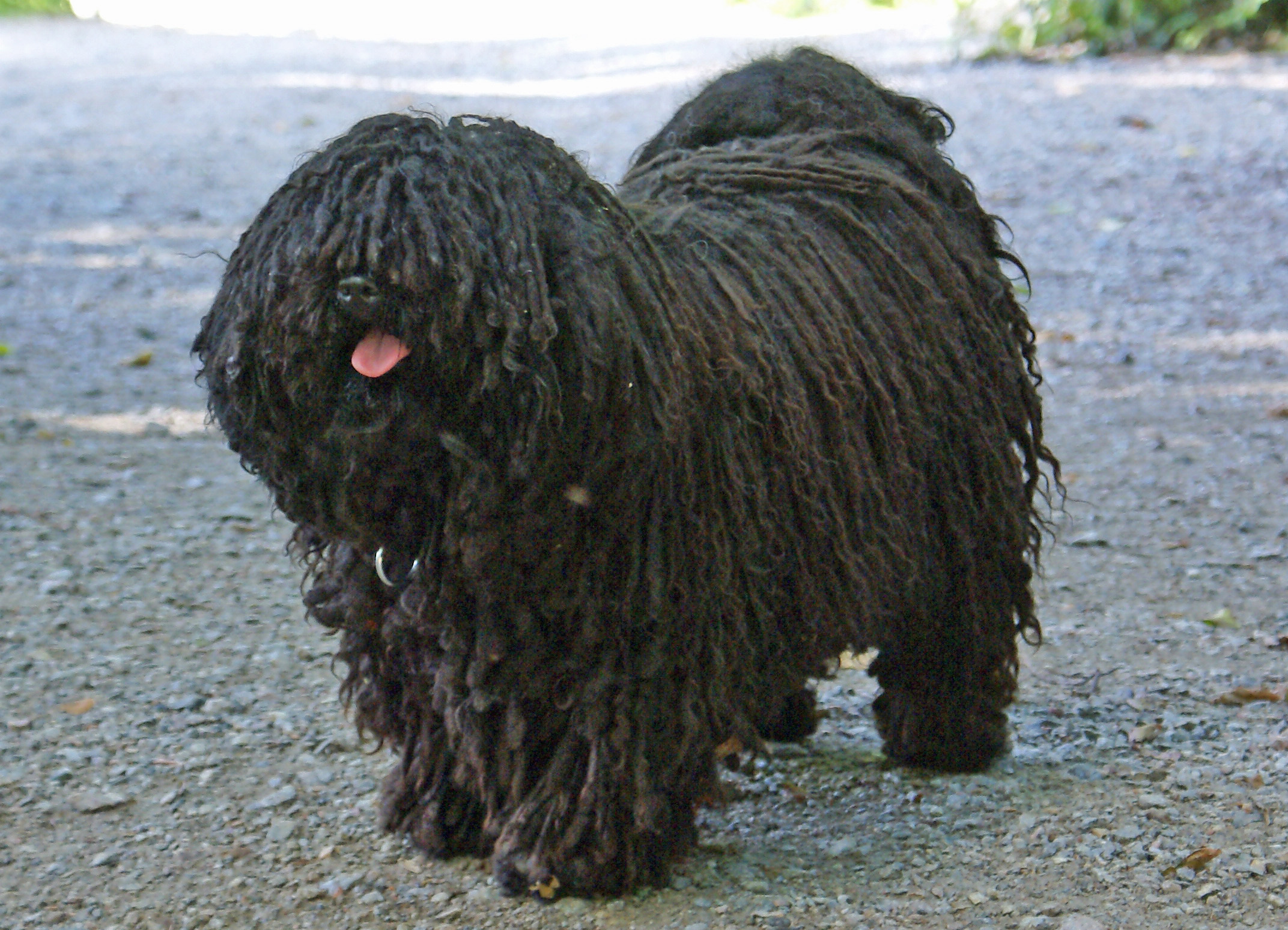
The Puli's coat forms cords as it grows.

The R (curl) Locus (Note: Researchers have not yet assigned a letter to this locus and "R" has been selected based on the use of the term "Rex" for curled hair in domestic cats.) The alleles at the R locus (the keratin-71 gene or KRT71) determine whether an animal's coat is straight or curly. There are two known alleles that occur at the R locus:

- R = Straight
- r = Curly

The relationship of R to r is one of no dominance. Heterozygotes (R/r) have wavy hair that is easily distinguishable from either homozygote. Wavy hair is considered desirable in several breeds, but because it is heterozygous, these breeds do not breed true for coat type.

Corded coats, like those of the Puli and Komondor are thought to be the result of continuously growing curly coats (long + wire + curly) with double coats, though the genetic code of corded dogs has not yet been studied. Corded coats will form naturally, but can be messy and uneven if not "groomed to cord" while the puppy's coat is lengthening.

=== Interaction of length and texture genes ===
These three genes responsible for the length and texture of an animal's coat interact to produce eight different (homozygous) phenotypes:

Coat type gene interactions		Straight; R/R	Wavy; R/r	Curly r/r
Non-wire w/w	Short; L/L or L/l	Short (e.g., Akita, Greyhound)	Short wavy (e.g., Chesapeake Bay Retriever)	Short curly (Curly Coated Retriever? (unproven))
Non-wire w/w	Long l/l	Long (e.g., Pomeranian, Cocker Spaniel)	Long wavy (e.g., Boykin Spaniel)	Long curly (e.g., Irish Water Spaniel)
Wire; W/W or W/w	Long l/l	Shaggy (e.g., Shih Tzu, Bearded Collie)	Poofy (e.g., Bichon Frise, Portuguese Water Dog, SCWT)	Long curly with furnishings or Corded (e.g., Poodle, Puli, Komondor)
Wire; W/W or W/w	Short; L/L or L/l	Wire (e.g., Border Terrier, Scottish Terrier)	Wavy wire (e.g., Wire Fox Terrier)	Curly-wire (e.g., Wirehaired Pointing Griffon)

=== Breed exceptions to coat type ===
Breeds in which coat type Is not explained by FgF5, RSPO2 and KRT71 genes:

- Yorkshire Terrier, Silky Terrier
- Afghan Hound

Genotypes of dogs of these 3 breeds are usually L/L or L/l, which does not match with their long-haired phenotype. The Yorkshire and Silky Terriers share common ancestry and likely share an unidentified gene responsible for their long hair. The Afghan Hound has a unique patterned coat that is long with short patches on the chest, face, back and tail. The Irish Water Spaniel may share the same pattern gene, although unlike the Afghan Hound, the IWS is otherwise genetically a long-haired (fixed for l/l) breed.

== Other related genes ==
=== Hairlessness gene ===
Some breeds of dog do not grow hair on parts of their bodies and may be referred to as hairless. Examples of hairless dogs are the Xoloitzcuintli (Mexican Hairless Dog), the Peruvian Inca Orchid (Peruvian Hairless Dog) and the Chinese Crested. Research suggests that hairlessness is caused by a dominant allele of the forkhead box transcription factor (FOXI3) gene, which is homozygous lethal. There are coated homozygous dogs in all hairless breeds, because this type of inheritance prevents the coat type from breeding true. The hairlessness gene permits hair growth on the head, legs and tail. Hair is sparse on the body, but present and typically enhanced by shaving, at least in the Chinese Crested, whose coat type is shaggy (long + wire). Teeth can be affected as well, and hairless dogs have sometimes incomplete dentition.

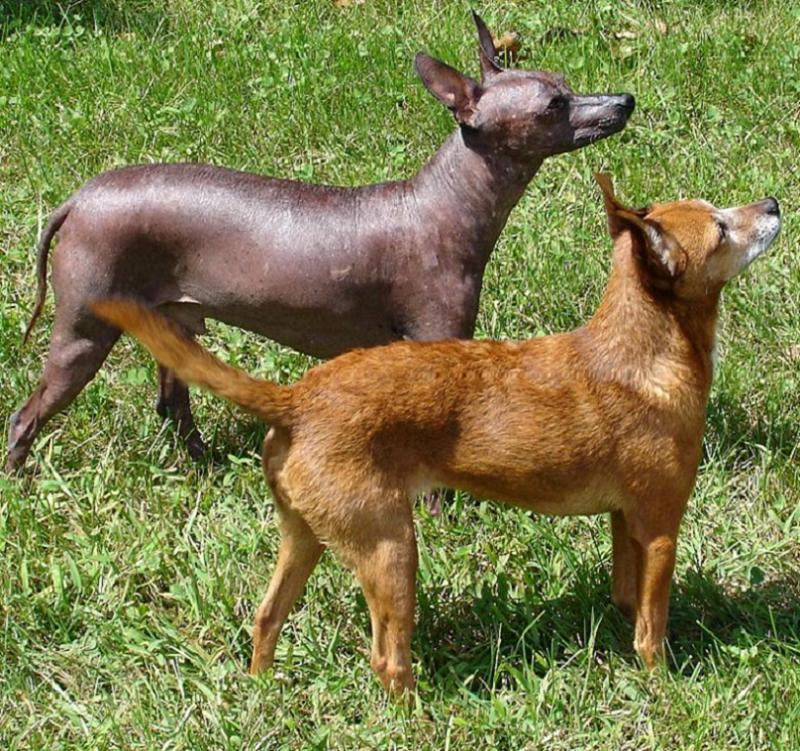
Hairless and Coated Xoloitzcuintli.

The American Hairless Terrier is unrelated to the other hairless breeds and displays a different hairlessness gene. Unlike the other hairless breeds, the AHT is born fully coated, and loses its hair within a few months. The AHT gene, serum/glucocorticoid regulated kinase family member 3 gene (SGK3), is recessive and does not result in missing teeth. Because the breed is new and rare, outcrossing to the parent breed (the Rat Terrier) is permitted to increase genetic diversity. These crosses are fully coated and heterozygous for AHT-hairlessness.

=== Ridgeback ===
Some breeds (e.g., Rhodesian Ridgeback, Thai Ridgeback) have an area of hair along the spine between the withers and hips that leans in the opposite direction (cranially) to the surrounding coat. The ridge is caused by a duplication of several genes (FGF3, FGF4, FGF 19, ORAOV1 and sometimes SNP), and ridge is dominant to non-ridged.

=== Nose colours ===
The most common colour of dog nose is black. However, a number of genes can affect nose colour.

- A blue dog nose is genetically impossible. But greyhounds without the blue dilution gene are sometimes found. Therefore, a dog that appears to be "blue" may have a black nose and black eyes because it is actually a black dog with the gray gene, not a proper blue diluent. Sometimes the blues can also be so dark that their coats and noses look almost black. It's hard to tell if these dogs are black or blue.
- A "butterfly" nose is a bright pink patch lacking pigment on the skin of a dog's nose. The patches are randomly positioned and can cover any number of noses, from a tiny pink blob to almost the entire nose. Butterfly noses are sometimes seen on dogs with extreme white spotted patterns, but usually they are associated with meteorite coloration. The meteorite gene diluted the random portion of pigment in the hair and nose, forming gray areas in the hair and pink areas in the nose. Liver and Isabella's nose are usually very light, sometimes completely pink or bright pink, so the butterfly nose may not appear in the liver or Isabella meteorite color.
- "Dudley nose" is a dog with a loss of pigment on its nose. Typically, the pigment loss on Dali's nose is in the middle and spreads outward, covering almost the entire nose of some dogs. Dudley's nose will never completely lose its pigment, nor will it be as bright pink as a butterfly's or even a liver dog's. Dudley noses are common in blacknosed dogs and are particularly associated with the recessive red gene.

=== Eye Colours ===
The genes also affect the eye colours of dogs. There are two main types of eye colours patterns.

==== Amber eyes ====
All hepatic dogs (bb) have amber eyes. Amber eyes vary from light brown to yellow, chartreuse, or gray. Dogs with melanin can occasionally see amber eyes.[article refers to Dr Sheila M. Schmutz]

==== Blue eyes ====
Blue eyes in dogs are often related to pigment loss in coatings.

- The merle gene results in a bluish iris, and merle dogs often have blue, walled, or split eyes due to random pigment loss. Some genetic variants cause Heterochromia iridum.
- The second way blue eyes can appear is when a dog has a lot of white fur on the face. Since the white areas cannot produce any pigment, pigment from the eyes and nose may be lost as well.
- The third way is when dogs are affected by albinism.
- A different gene, unaffected by coat color, can make the eyes blue. However, this gene is rare. It occurs occasionally in Border Collies and similar breeds, but is mostly seen in Siberian Huskies, which may have one or both eyes blue, regardless of their predominant coat color.

== Genetic testing and phenotype prediction ==
In recent years genetic testing for the alleles of some genes has become available. Software is also available to assist breeders in determining the likely outcome of matings.

=== Characteristics linked to coat colour ===
The genes responsible for the determination of coat colour also affect other melanin-dependent development, including skin colour, eye colour, eyesight, eye formation and hearing. In most cases, eye colour is directly related to coat colour, but blue eyes in the Siberian Husky and related breeds, and copper eyes in some herding dogs are not known to be related to coat colour.

The development of coat colour, skin colour, iris colour, pigmentation in back of eye and melanin-containing cellular elements of the auditory system occur independently, as does development of each element on the left vs right side of the animal. This means that in semi-random genes (M merle, s spotting and T ticking), the expression of each element is independent. For example, skin spots on a piebald-spotted dog will not match up with the spots in the dog's coat; and a merle dog with one blue eye can just as likely have better eyesight in its blue eye than in its brown eye.

=== Loci for coat colour, type and length ===
All known genes are on separate chromosomes, and therefore no gene linkage has yet been described among coat genes. However, they do share chromosomes with other major conformational genes, and in at least one case, breeding records have shown an indication of genes passed on together.

Gene	Chromosome (in dogs)	Symbol	Locus name	Description	Share chr
ASIP	24	A^{y}, a^{w}, a^{t}, a	Agouti	Sable, wolf-sable, tan point, recessive black; a^{s} disproven	
TYRP1	11	B, b^{s}, b^{d}, b^{c}	Brown	Black, 3 x chocolate / liver	
SLC45A2	4	C, c^{aZ},c^{aL}	Colour	C = full color, 2 recessive alleles for types of albinism	STC2, GHR(1) & GHR(2) size
MLPH	25	D, d	Dilution	Black/chocolate, blue/isabella	
MC1R	5	E^{m}, E^{g}, E, e^{h}, e	Extension	Black mask, grizzle, normal extension, cocker-sable, recessive red	
PSMB7	9	H, h	Harlequin	Harlequin, non-harlequin	
DEFB103	16	K^{B}, K^{br}, k^{y}	blacK	Dominant black, brindle, fawn/sable/banded hairs	
FgF5	32	L, l	Longcoat	Short coat, long coat	
PMEL	10	M, m	Merle	Double merle, merle, non-merle	HMGA2 size
KRT71	27	R, r	cuRlycoat	Straight coat, curly coat	
MITF	20	S, s^{i}, s^{p}	Spotting	Solid, Irish spotting, piebald spotting; s^{w} not proven to exist	
RSPO2	13	W, w	Wirecoat	Wire coat, non-wire coat	
MC5R	1	n/a	Shedding	Single coat/minimal shedding, double coat/regular shedding	C189G bobtail
FOXI3	17	n/a	Hairless	Hairless, coated	
SGK3	29	n/a	AHT	Coated, AHT-hairless	
n/a	18	n/a	Ridgeback	Ridgeback, non-ridgeback	
--	3	-	-	No coat genes yet identified here.	IGF1R size
--	7	-	-	No coat genes yet identified here.	SMAD2 size
--	15	-	-	No coat genes yet identified here.	IGF1 size

There are size genes on all 39 chromosomes, 17 classified as "major" genes. 7 of those are identified as being of key importance and each results in ~2x difference in body weight. IGF1 (Insulin-like growth factor 1), SMAD2 (Mothers against decapentaplegic homolog 2), STC2 (Stanniocalcin-2) and GHR(1) (Growth hormone receptor one) are dose-dependent with compact dwarfs vs leaner large dogs and heterozygotes of intermediate size and shape. IGF1R (Insulin-like growth factor 1 receptor) and HMGA2 (High-mobility group AT-hook 2) are incomplete dominant with delicate dwarfs vs compact large dogs and heterozygotes closer to the homozygous dwarfed phenotypes. GHR(2) (Growth hormone receptor two) is completely dominant, homozygous and heterozygous dwarfs equally small, larger dogs with a broader flatter skull and larger muzzle. It is believed that the PMEL/SILV merle gene is linked to the HMGA2 size gene, meaning that alleles are most often inherited together, accounting for size differences in merle vs non-merle litter mates, such as in the Chihuahua and the Great Dane (merles usually larger) and Shetland Sheepdog (merles frequently smaller).

== Gallery ==
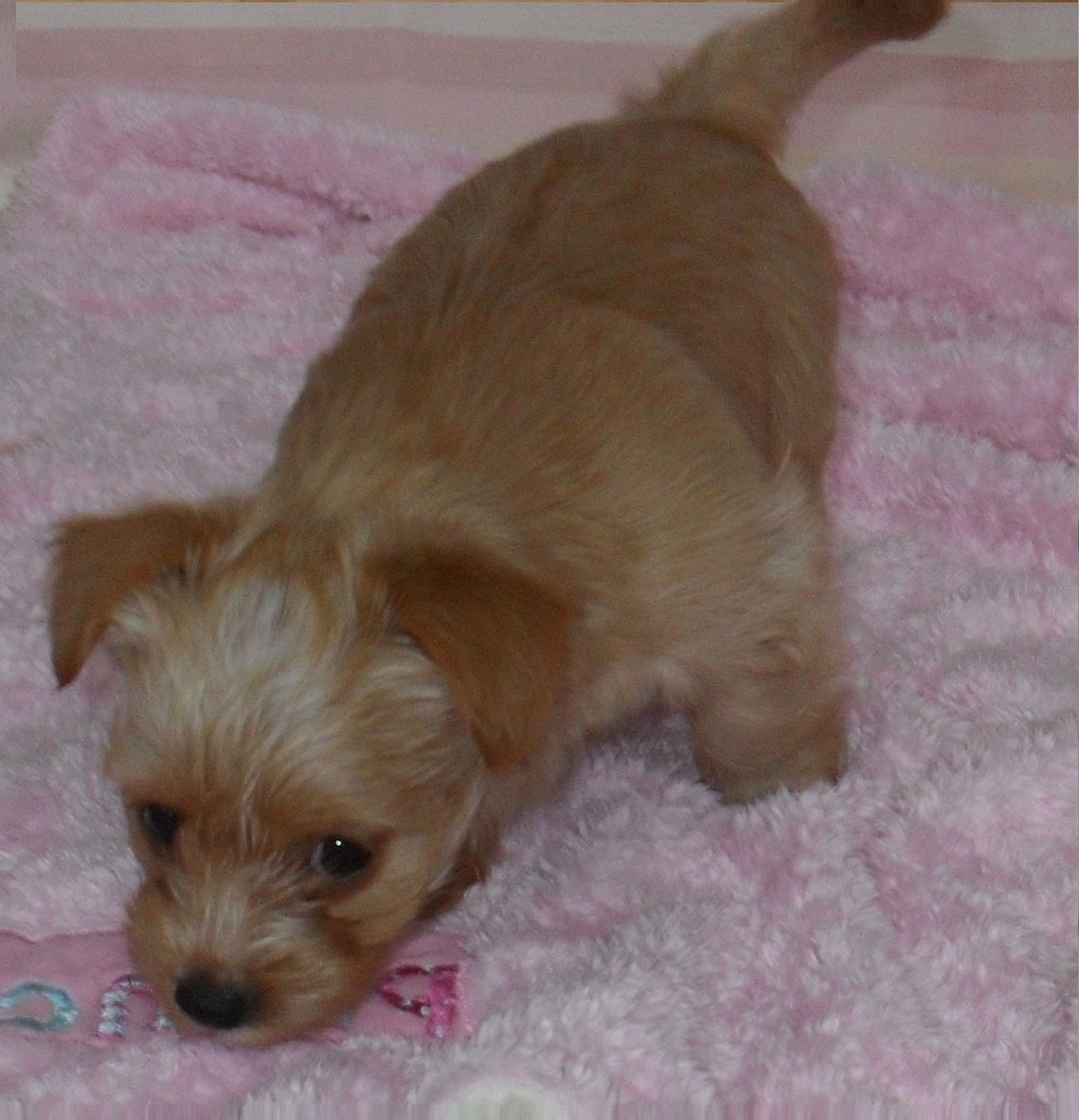
Dogs with Genotype ee can only store pheomelanin in the fur. BB or Bb on the B locus still allows a black nose.

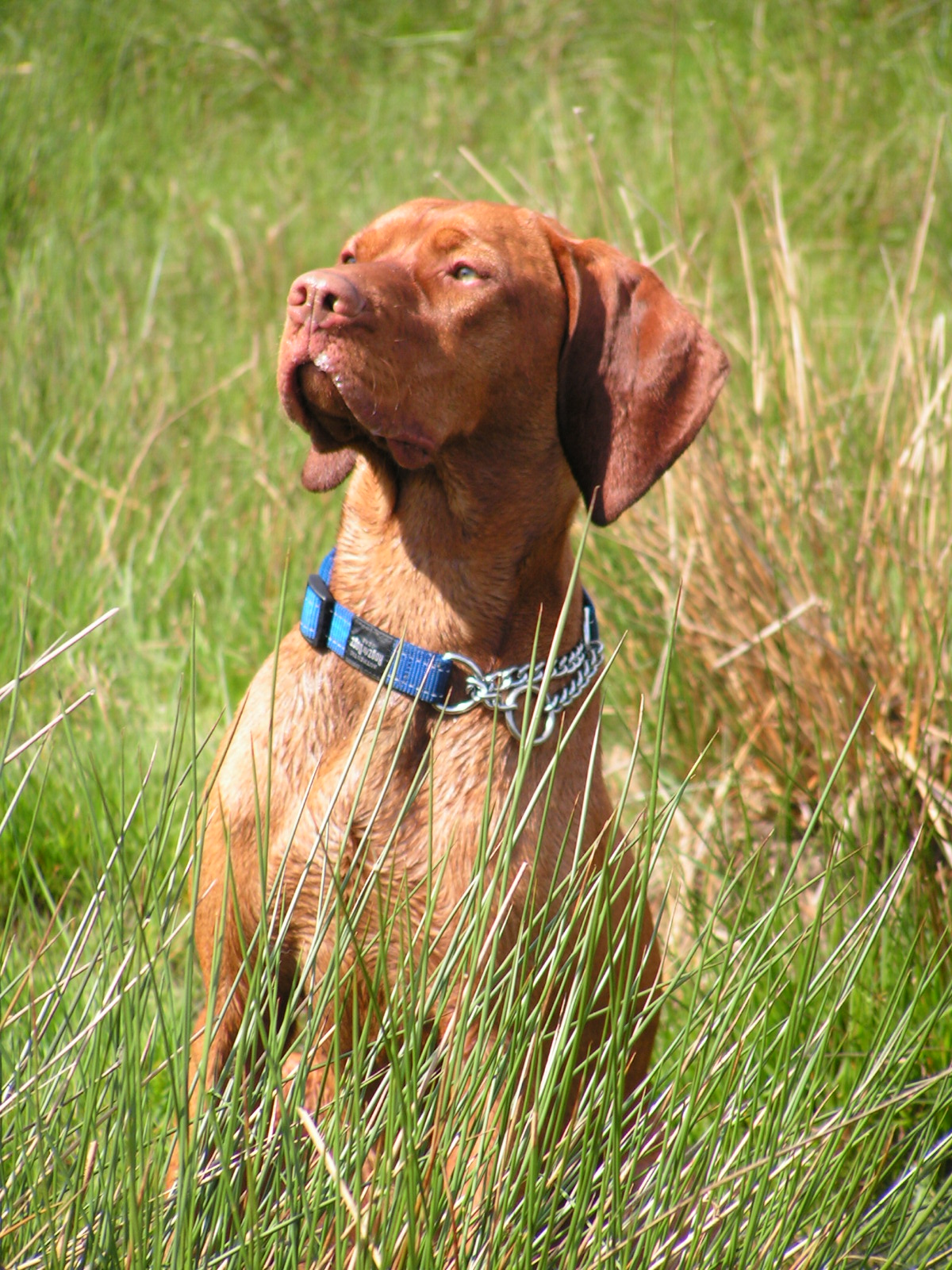
Genotyp ee and bb for brown eumelanin causes red fur and liver-nose.

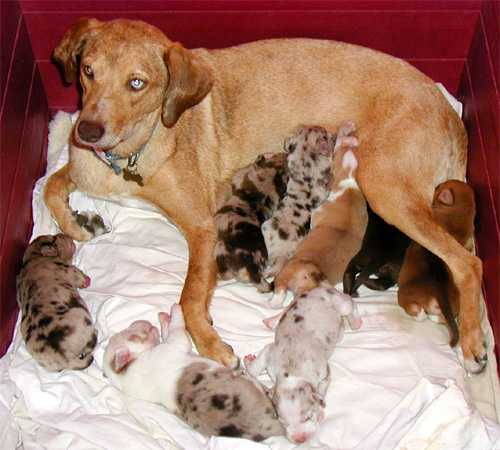
In dogs with recessive red the Merle factor can be hidden, as they don't have eumelanin in the fur.

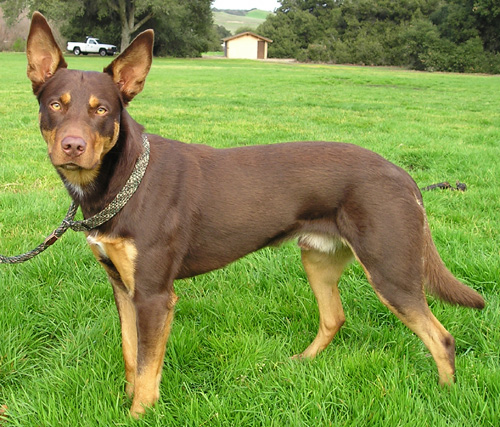
Allele a^{t} with bb on B-Locus. Tan points with eumelanin lightened to brown.

Brindle French bulldog

== See also ==
- Labrador Retriever coat colour genetics
- Cat coat genetics
- Equine coat color genetics
- Farm-Fox Experiment
