= Grizzle =

Grizzle is a surname. Notable people with the name include:

- David Grizzle, American business executive
- Mary Grizzle (1921–2006), American politician and advocate of the Equal Rights Amendment
- Stanley G. Grizzle (1918–2016), Canadian citizenship judge and labour union activist
- Trevor Lloyd Grizzle (born 1947), American academic and New Testament scholar

== See also ==
- Grizzly
- Grizabella
- Dog coat
