= Trevor Lloyd Grizzle =

Jamaican academic and professor

- Born: December 25, 1947 (age 78); Jamaica
- Occupation: Professor of New Testament Studies

Academic background
- Education: Lee University, Southwestern Baptist Theological Seminary
- Thesis: Jesus' Concept of Liberation as Reflected in the Gospel of John (1984)

Academic work
- Institutions: Oral Roberts University

Trevor Lloyd Grizzle (born December 25, 1947) is a Jamaican academic and professor of New Testament Studies at Oral Roberts University.

== Personal life ==
Trevor Grizzle was born in Jamaica on December 25, 1947. He converted to Christianity in 1964 in England. He was ordained in 1968 and was a missionary in Ghana.

He earned his B.A. at Lee University in 1975, his M.Div. at Southwestern Baptist Theological Seminary in 1978, and his Ph.D. at Southwestern Baptist Theological Seminary in 1984.

== Contributions ==
Grizzle's capacity as professor at the charismatic Oral Roberts University clearly links him with the charismatic movement. He also disseminates his charismatic scholarship to lay audiences, such as at church conferences. His scholarly contribution to the field of Christian pneumatology is evident in his publications, for example: Church Aflame and his contributions to The Spirit-filled Life Bible. Another way in which his expertise is evident in his endorsements of publications oriented on the charismatic expression of Christianity. Grizzle, furthermore, serves on the editorial board of Reconciliation, The Official Journal of the Pentecostal/Charismatic Churches of North America (PCCNA). In short, Grizzle earned a reputation as a notable academic within the charismatic Christianity.

Besides Grizzle's contributions in the field of pneumatology, he is also actively involved in the ongoing debate on racial and cultural division in religion. He assumed the position of New Testament and Greek in the Graduate School of Theology and Missions at Oral Roberts University in 1982.... Conjointly with teaching at ORU, he has served as Associate Pastor of Care Fellowship Church of God in Tulsa for six years, but presently (in addition to teaching full-time) pastors Hope International Ministries, which he founded in March 2002.

== Teaching Awards ==
In 1991 and 1998, respectively, Dr. Grizzle was voted Outstanding Faculty of the Year by both the faculty and student body of the School of Theology, and nominated ORU Scholar of the Year in 2001.

== Ministry ==
In 1968, he received ministerial credentials from the Church of God (Cleveland, TN). He embarked upon full-time missionary service in Ghana, West Africa, conjointly with teaching at ORU. He has served as Associate Pastor of Care Fellowship Church of God in Tulsa for six years, but presently (in addition to teaching full-time) pastors Hope International Ministries, which he founded in March 2002.

== Works ==
=== Thesis ===
- Grizzle, Trevor Lloyd (1984). Jesus' Concept of Liberation as Reflected in the Gospel of John (Ph.D.). Southwestern Baptist Theological Seminary. OCLC 11340872.

=== Books ===
- Grizzle, Trevor Lloyd (2000). Church Aflame: An Exposition of Acts 1-12. Cleveland, TN: Pathway Press. ISBN 9780871482129. OCLC 46781108.
- ——— (2013). Ephesians. Pentecostal commentary series. Blandford Forum, UK: Deo Publishing. ISBN 9781905679195. OCLC 840636735.

=== Edited by ===
- ———; Trent, Mary Alice; Sehorn, Margaret, eds. (2007). Religion, Culture, Curriculum, and Diversity in 21st Century America. Lanham, MD: Univ. Press of America. ISBN 9780761835585. OCLC 266607268.
- ———; Trent, Mary Alice; Lang, Andrew; Rogers, Elsa, eds. (2007). The Language of Diversity: Restoration toward Peace and Unity. Newcastle, UK: Cambridge Scholars Pub. ISBN 9781443809016. OCLC 954254847.
