= Doberman (disambiguation) =

Doberman or Dobermann most commonly refers to Dobermann, a breed of dog.

It may also refer to:

- Doberman (album), a 2003 album by Tomoyasu Hotei
- Doberman (band), a Japanese ska/punk band
- "The Doberman", a song by Kasabian on their album Empire
- Dobermann (film), a 1997 French film starring Vincent Cassel
- Dobermann (surname)
- Doberman-Yppan, a North American music publisher
- Doberman Detective, a manga series and its feature film adaptation
- Duane Doberman, a character from The Phil Silvers Show
