= Apolda =

- Town
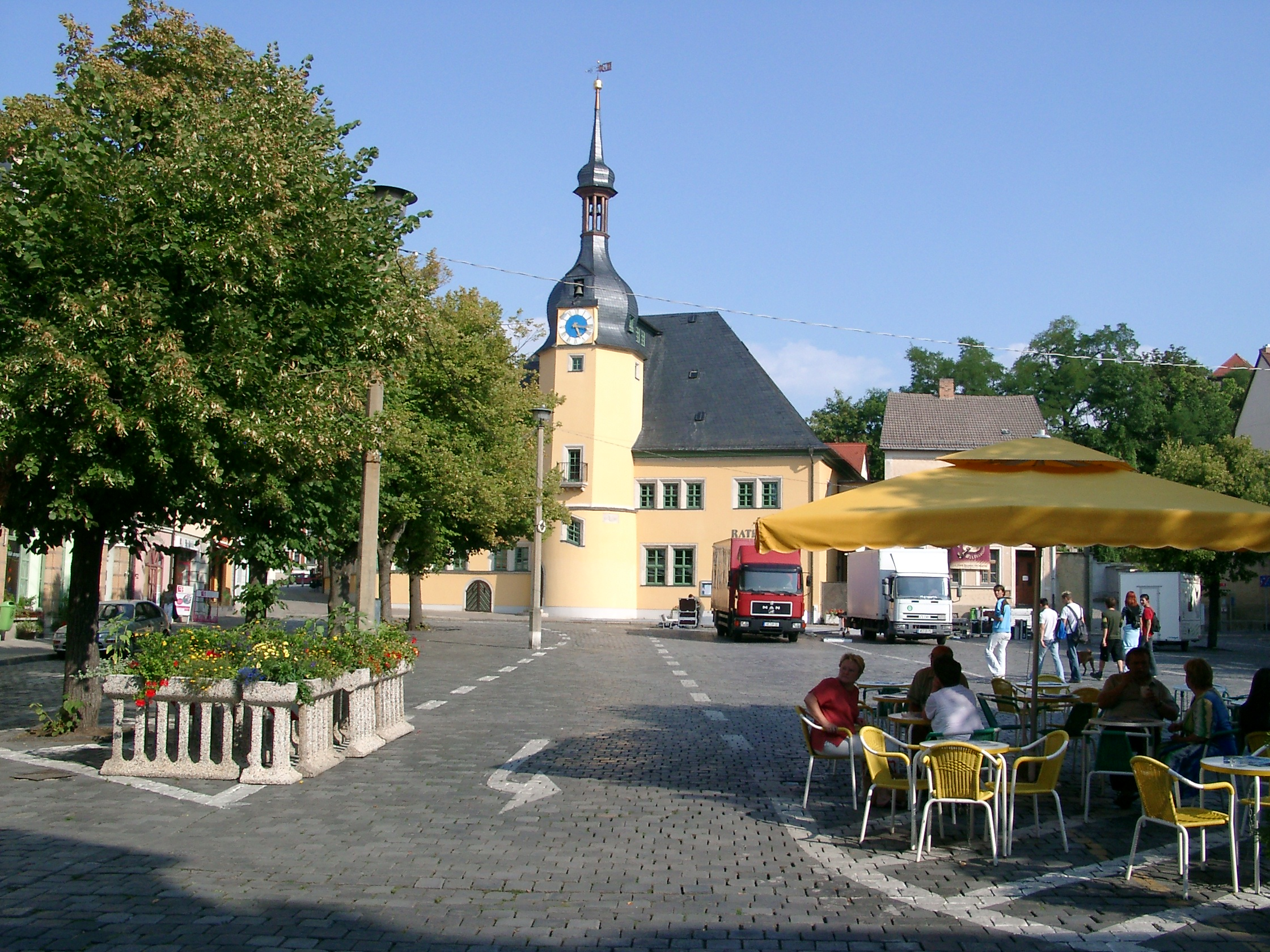

- Coat of arms

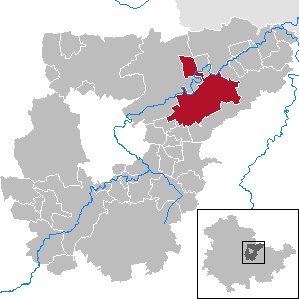
- Location of Apolda within Weimarer Land district
- Interactive map of Apolda
- Location within Germany Location within Thuringia
- Coordinates: 51°1′N 11°31′E
- Country: Germany
- State: Thuringia
- District: Weimarer Land

Government
  - Mayor (2024–30): Olaf Müller

Area
  - Total: 46.27 km^{2} (17.86 sq mi)
- Elevation: 205 m (673 ft)

Population (2025-12-31)
  - Total: 22,787
  - Density: 492.5/km^{2} (1,276/sq mi)
- Time zone: UTC+01:00 (CET)
  - Summer (DST): UTC+02:00 (CEST)
- Postal codes: 99501-99510
- Dialling codes: 03644, 036462, 036465
- Vehicle registration: AP, APD
- Website: www.apolda.de

Apolda (German: [aˈpɔlda]) is a town in central Thuringia, Germany, the capital of the Weimarer Land district. It is situated in the center of the triangle Weimar–Jena–Naumburg near the river Ilm, c. 15 kilometres (9 miles) east by north from Weimar. Apolda station lies on the Halle–Bebra railway, which is part of the main line from Berlin to Frankfurt.

== History ==
Apolda was first mentioned in 1119. Until 1633 it was seat of a family of nobles, the Vitzthums, which acted relatively independent. Between 1633 and World War I Apolda was property of the University of Jena. Nevertheless, from 1691 to 1809 Apolda was part of the Duchy of Saxe-Weimar and from 1809 to 1918 of Saxe-Weimar-Eisenach (after 1815 Grand Duchy). Around 1700, the knitting industry began to grow, so that finally, at the end of the 19th century, Apolda was the wealthiest town of the whole region. On July 12–17, 1945, Apolda issued a set of three of its own postage stamps. They depicted a new sprig growing up out of a tree stump. After World War II, Thuringia became part of the German Democratic Republic. Up to German reunification, Apolda still was famous for its textile industries. Since then, a notable economic decay has taken place.

== Main historic sights ==
It possesses several churches and monuments to the Dobermann Pinscher dog breed, which was created in Apolda, and to Christian Zimmermann (1759–1842), who, by introducing the hosiery and cloth manufacture, made Apolda one of the most important places in Germany in these branches of industry. By 1900 it also had had extensive dyeworks, bell foundries, and manufactures of steam engines, boilers, cars and bicycles. After German reunification the majority of these had to be closed down for economical reasons. The largest free hanging bell in the world, the Decke Pitter of Cologne Cathedral, was made in Apolda. Apolda also has mineral springs.

The most important sights are:

- St. Martin's Church (1119), details in Romanesque, Gothic and Baroque style
- Town Hall (1558/9), in Renaissance style
- Castle (16th/17th century)
- Railway viaduct (1845/46)
- Lutherkirche (1894)
- St. Boniface's Church (1894)
- Glocken museum (Bell museum)
- Prager house (1925), a Holocaust memorial

== Architecture ==
The Zimmermann factory building (1880-1881) was designed by the architect Karl Timmler and is noted for its yellow brick cladding. The Eiermann Building (1906-1907) was designed by the Bauhaus architect Egon Eiermann who evangelized about Neues Bauen in the 1930s. Eiermann converted the existing structure, adding a roof terrace reminiscent of a ship deck.

== Mayors ==
Ernst Stegmann was the long-time mayor of Apolda with 33 years in office (1901-1934).

Period of office	Name
1869–1871	Dr. jur. Hugo Mentz
1871–1877	Gustav Francke
1878–1888	Julius Schrön
1888–1890	Friedrich August Eupel
1890–1896	Oskar Stechow
1896–1900	Georg von Fewson
1901–1934	Ernst Stegmann
1934–1945	Julius Dietz

Period of office	Name
from 23.4.1945	Friedrich Maul
from 3.6.1945	Walther Lührs
from 8.10.1945	Johannes Berger
1947–1948	Kurt Meyn
1948–1950	Kurt Sparschuh
1950–1953	Wilhelm Tischer
1953–1955	Anton Lifka
1955–1959	Kurt Koch

Period of office	Name
1959–1963	Rudi Doye
1963–1983	Hans Reichert
1983–1985	Elke Brauer
1985–1989	Gerhard Brauer
1989–1990	Jürgen Goller
1990–2006	Michael Müller
2006–2024	Rüdiger Eisenbrand
since 2024	Olaf Müller

== Twin towns – sister cities ==
Apolda is twinned with:

- Mark, Sweden
- Rapid City, United States
- San Miniato, Italy
- Seclin, France

== Notable people ==
- Karl Friedrich Louis Dobermann (1834–1894), first breeder of the Doberman Pinscher
- Otto Franz Georg Schilling (1911–1973), mathematician
- Albert Raisner (1922–2011), musician and TV host
- Klaus Agthe (born 1930), businessman and author
- Mike Mohring (born 1971), politician (CDU)
- Erich Seidel, ophthalmologist known for Seidel test and Seidel sign

== See also ==
- Prager house
