= Bad Sulza station =

Railway station in Bad Sulza, Germany

Bad Sulza
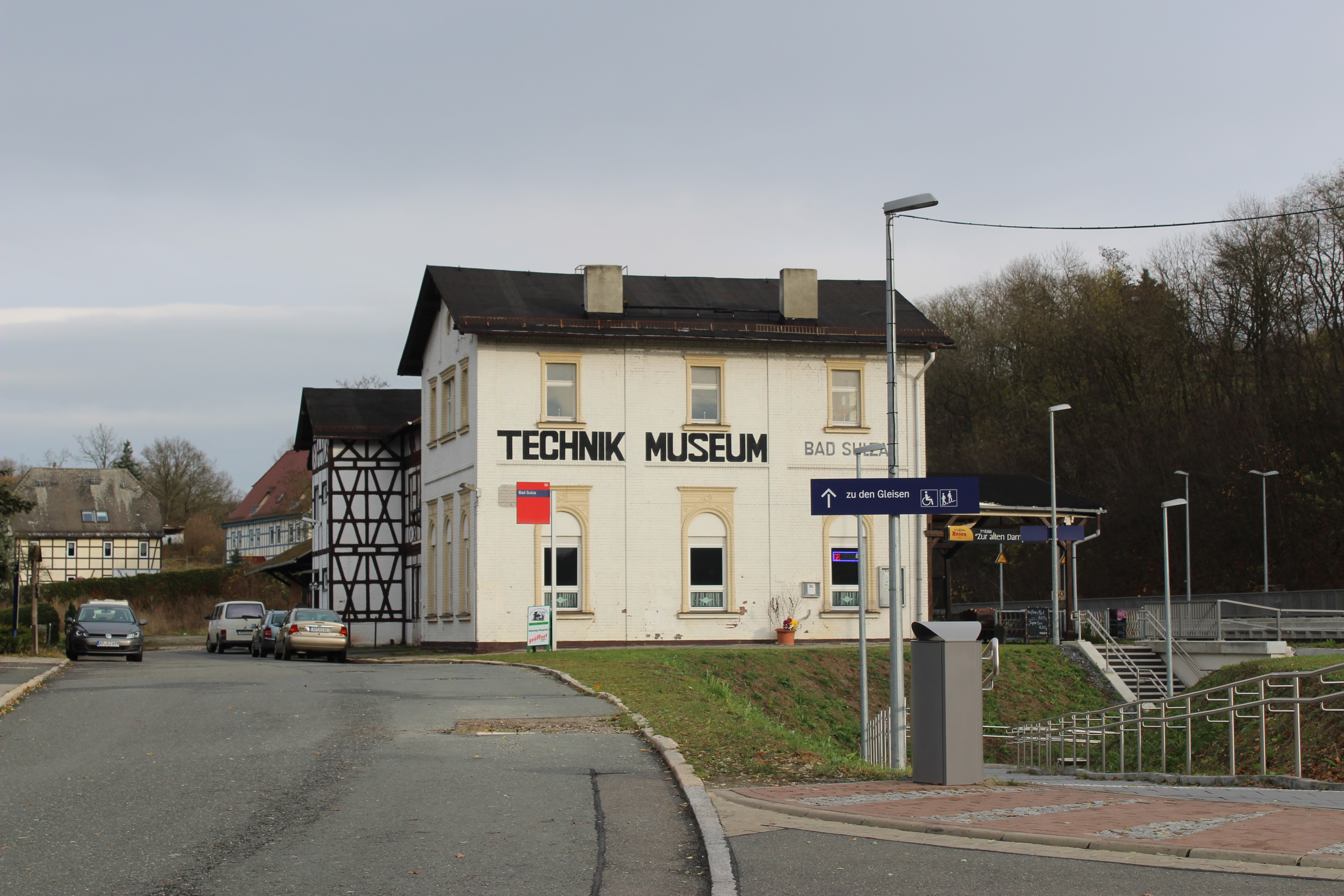
- 2017

General information
- Location: Am Hauptbahnhof 1; 99518 Bad Sulza; Thuringia; Germany
- Coordinates: 51°05′42″N 11°38′06″E
- System: Hp
- Owner: Deutsche Bahn
- Operator: DB Station&Service
- Lines: Halle–Bebra railway (KBS 580)
- Platforms: 1 island platform
- Tracks: 2
- Train operators: Abellio Rail Mitteldeutschland
- Connections: RE 16RE 17; RB 20

Construction
- Parking: yes
- Cycle facilities: yes
- Accessible: yes

Other information
- Station code: 353
- DS100 code: UBS
- IBNR: 8011085
- Category: 6
- Fare zone: VMT
- Website: www.bahnhof.de

Services
Preceding station	Abellio Rail Mitteldeutschland	Following station
Apolda towards Erfurt Hbf	RE 16 selected trains only	Großheringen towards Halle (Saale) Hbf
Apolda towards Erfurt Hbf	RE 17	Großheringen towards Leipzig Hbf
Niedertrebra towards Eisenach	RB 20	Großheringen towards Leipzig Hbf
Location
- Location within Thuringia Location within Germany Location within Europe

Bad Sulza station is a railway station in the municipality of Bad Sulza, located in the Weimarer Land district in Thuringia, Germany.
