= Großheringen station =

Railway station in Großheringen, Germany

Großheringen
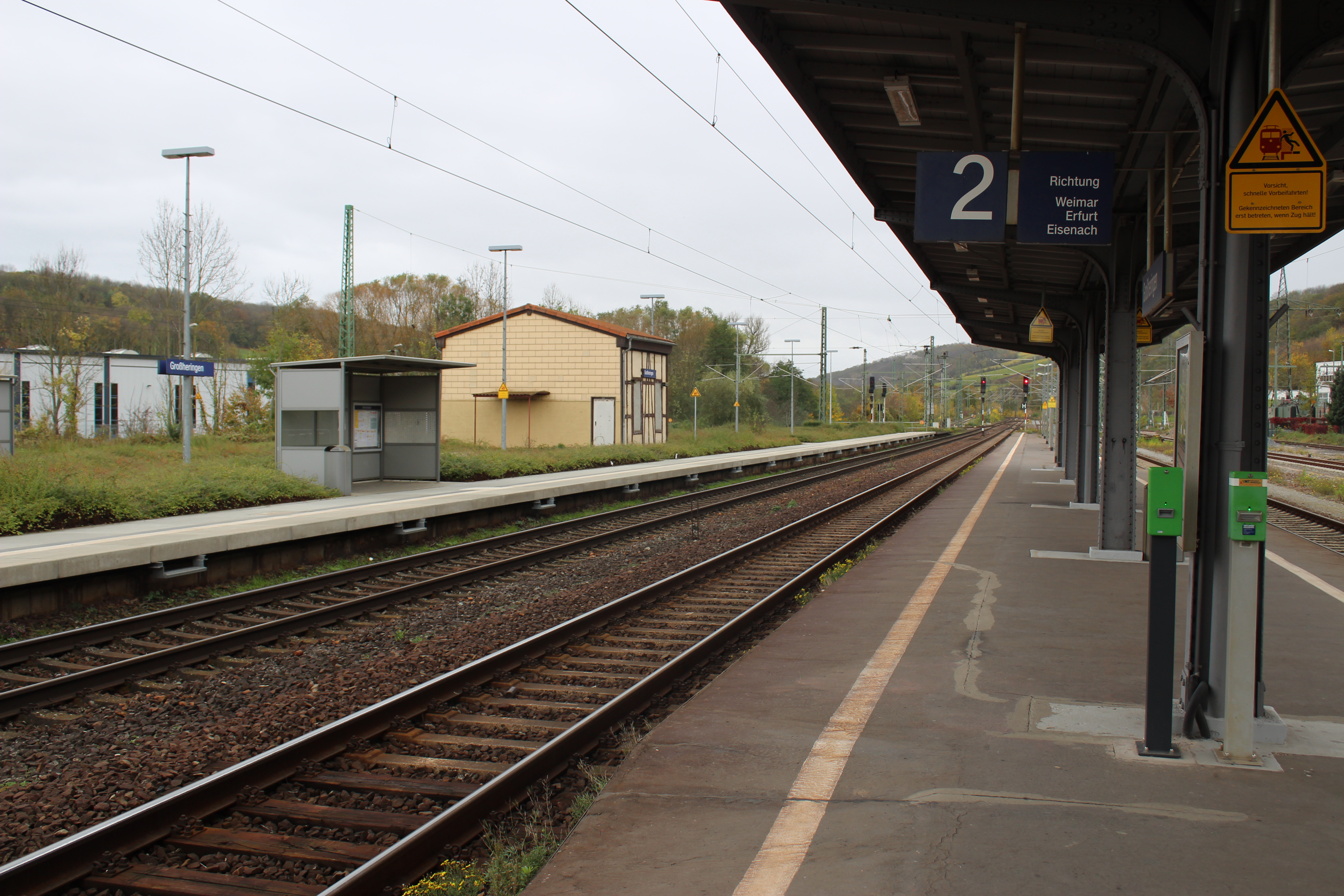
- 2017

General information
- Location: In der Aue; 99518 Großheringen; Thuringia; Germany
- Coordinates: 51°06′22″N 11°39′28″E
- Elevation: 122 m (400 ft)
- System: Bf
- Owner: Deutsche Bahn
- Operator: DB Station&Service
- Lines: Halle–Bebra railway (KBS 580); Großheringen–Saalfeld railway (KBS 560); Straußfurt–Großheringen railway (KBS 594)
- Platforms: 2 island platforms 1 side platform
- Tracks: 6
- Train operators: Abellio Rail Mitteldeutschland

Construction
- Parking: yes
- Cycle facilities: yes
- Accessible: partly

Other information
- Station code: 2347
- DS100 code: UGH
- IBNR: 8010145
- Category: 5
- Fare zone: VMT
- Website: www.bahnhof.de

History
- Opened: 1 May 1874; 152 years ago

Services
Preceding station	Abellio Rail Mitteldeutschland	Following station
Apolda towards Erfurt Hbf	RE 16	Bad Kösen towards Halle (Saale) Hbf
Bad Sulza towards Erfurt Hbf	RE 17	Bad Kösen towards Leipzig Hbf
Bad Sulza towards Eisenach	RB 20	Bad Kösen towards Leipzig Hbf
Location
- Location within Thuringia Location within Germany Location within Europe

Großheringen station is a railway station in the municipality of Großheringen, located in the Weimarer Land district in Thuringia, Germany.
