= Dobermann (surname) =

Dobermann is a German surname. Notable people with the surname include:

- Karl Friedrich Louis Dobermann (1834–1894), German dog breeder
- Rudi Dobermann (1902–1979), German athlete
