= Canine follicular dysplasia =

Genetic disease in dogs

Follicular dysplasia is a genetic disease of dogs causing alopecia, also called hair loss. It is caused by hair follicles that are misfunctioning due to structural abnormality. There are several types, some affecting only certain breeds. Diagnosis is achieved through a biopsy, and treatment is rarely successful. Certain breeds, such as the Mexican Hairless Dog and Chinese Crested Dog, are bred specifically for alopecia.

== Structural follicular dysplasia ==
Structural follicular dysplasia varies by breed but all involve weakened hairs that break easily. Hair loss is originally seen in areas of repeated grooming or trauma, for instance the neck because of contact with a collar. Hair regrowth may occur, but the hair will be even weaker and the pattern will repeat. The dogs are affected between the ages of two and four years, and it is most commonly seen on the back towards the tail. Progression of the hair loss to cover the trunk can occur.

=== Commonly affected breeds ===
- Irish Water Spaniel
- Portuguese Water Dog
- Curly Coated Retriever

== Atrophic follicular dysplasia / pattern baldness ==
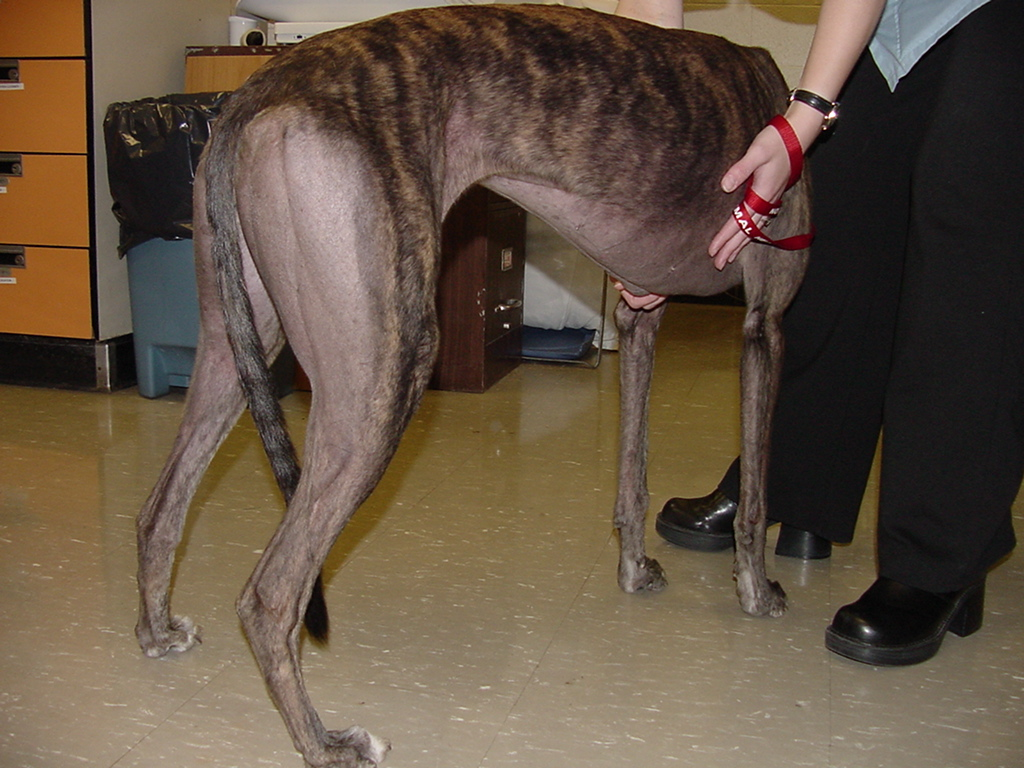
A greyhound with bald thigh syndrome, a form of pattern baldness seen in this breed

In some breeds hair follicles in certain parts of the body become progressively miniaturized, analogous to what occurs in male pattern baldness in humans. It is most commonly seen in Dachshunds, Miniature Pinschers, and Chihuahuas. Affected areas become progressively more alopecic. The pattern of hairlessness that results is somewhat breed-dependent and sex dependent. In short-coated toy and miniature dogs, ventral neck, ventral chest, ventral abdomen and inner thighs are affected. In males, the pinnae (ear flaps) are affected. In Greyhounds, the thighs are affected as well as the ventral chest and abdomen.

== Cyclic follicular dysplasia ==
Cyclic follicular dysplasia is also known as seasonal alopecia.

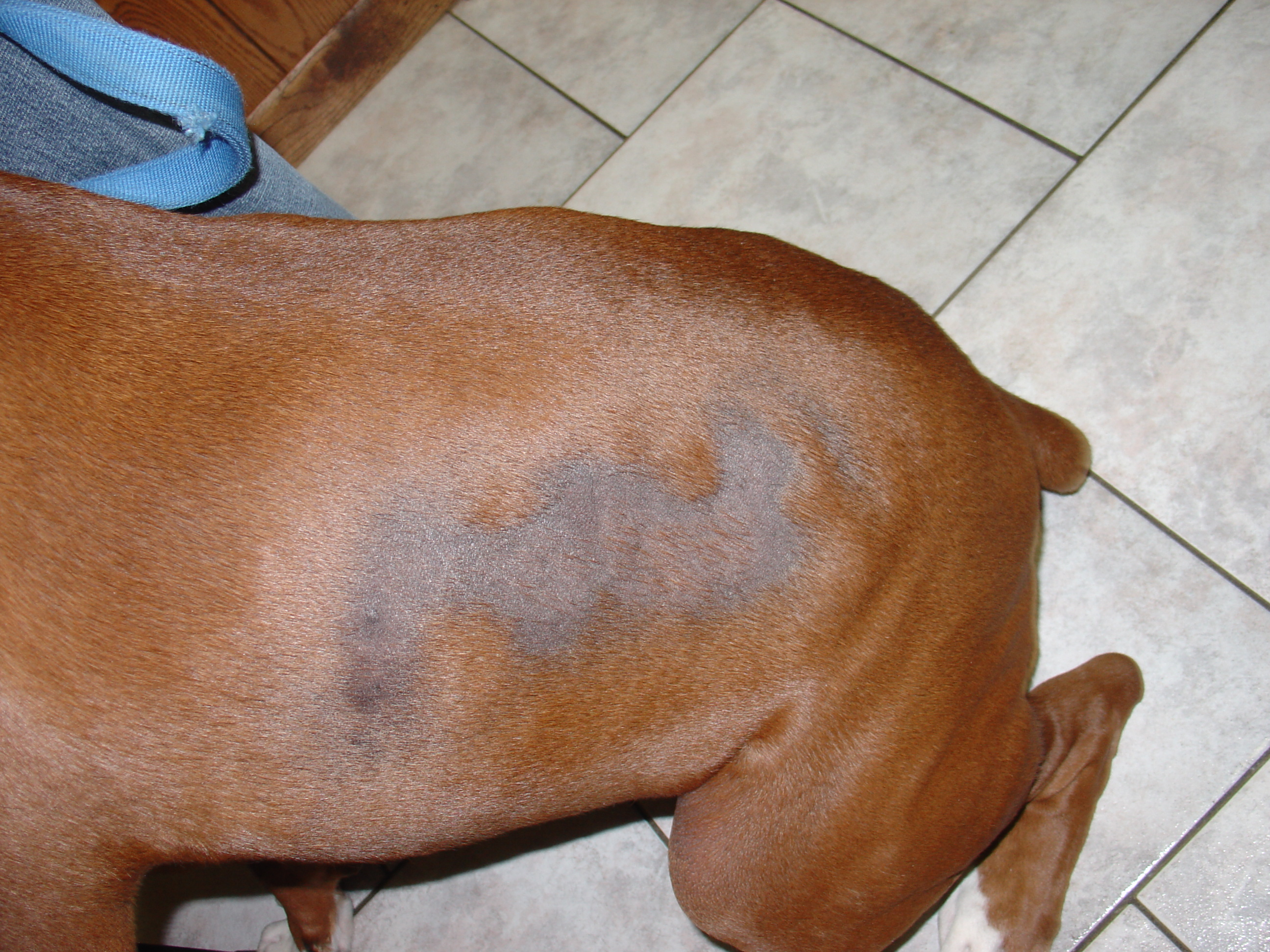
Seasonal alopecia

It causes bilateral hair loss and hyperpigmentation of the flanks. The disease usually starts in the late fall or early spring, and can regrow in about six months, although the hair may be different in color or texture. Treatment with melatonin may result in hair regrowth sooner, so it is thought that the amount of daylight influences this condition. The dogs are affected between the ages of two and four years.

=== Commonly affected breeds ===
- Airedale Terrier
- Bulldog
- Rhodesian Ridgeback
- Staffordshire Bull Terrier
- Wirehaired Pointing Griffon
- Boxer
- Affenpinscher

== Follicular lipidosis ==
Follicular lipidosis is a type of follicular dysplasia found in the Rottweiler and other red point dogs. It usually occurs before the age of nine months and involves loss of some of the mahogany or red hair of the face and feet. It is caused by lipid invasion of the hair follicle cells.

== Color dilution alopecia ==
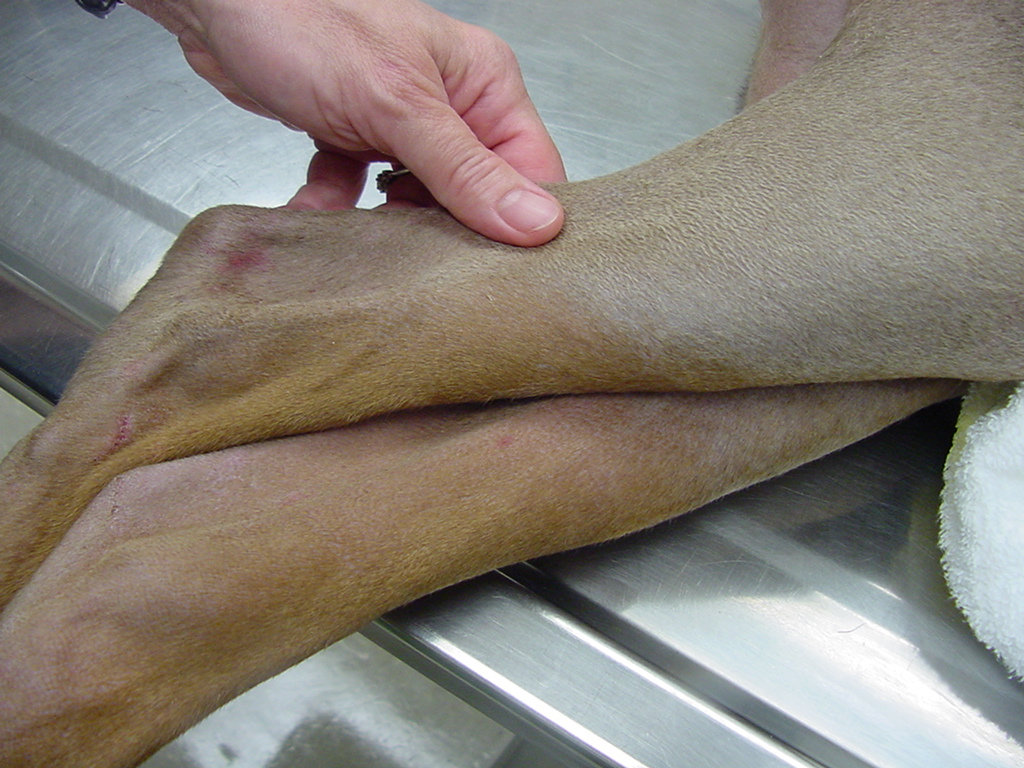
Color dilution alopecia in a fawn doberman. The close-up of the leg shows the characteristic sparing of the tan color points in this syndrome, only fawn hairs being affected.

Color dilution alopecia is caused by a dilution gene affecting eumelanin. It is an inherited type of follicular dysplasia. It most commonly affects dogs with blue or fawn coats, which are dilutions of black and brown, respectively Dilution is caused by irregularities in melanin transfer and storage. Melanosomes may clump within melanocytes of the skin and hair follicles, causing the hair shafts to easily fracture. Signs of color dilution alopecia include hair loss and recurrent skin infection on the back. It can involve the whole body. The condition starts between the ages of six months and two years, depending on the degree of dilution. Early hair loss occurs due to hair breakage, making it similar to structural follicular alopecia. It is important to treat the skin infections, and etretinate has been used to treat the hair loss.

In several dog breeds but also in mongrels, dogs with the predisposition due to their coat genetics with the MLPH gene (melanophilin) suffer from colour dilution alopecia (CDA). Interestingly in Great Danes and Weimaraners there are usually no problems due to the dilution gene. The reasons for this are not yet known.

=== Commonly affected breeds ===
- Dobermann - has the highest frequency of this condition. It occurs in 93 percent of blues and 75 percent of fawns.
- Dachshund
- Great Dane
- Rhodesian Ridgeback
- Whippet
- Italian Greyhound
- Chow Chow
- Standard Poodle
- Miniature Pinscher
- Yorkshire Terrier
- Silky Terrier
- Chihuahua
- Boston Terrier
- Newfoundland
- German Shepherd Dog
- Shetland Sheepdog
- Schipperke
- Bernese Mountain Dog
- Bulldog
- Mudi

== Black hair follicular dysplasia ==
Black hair follicular dysplasia only affects black fur. Affected fur will not grow back and dogs are likely to develop skin infections and follicular plugging. The condition is believed to be caused by an autosomal recessive trait.

Breeds reported to be infected include the Dachshund, Jack Russell Terrier, King Charles Cavalier Spaniel, Saluki, Bearded Collie, Border Collie, Beagle, Basset Hound, Pointers, Gordon Setter, Doberman Pinscher, Large Münsterländer‚ and New Zealand Huntaway.

== Other types of follicular dysplasia ==
The Siberian Husky and Alaskan Malamute have a type of follicular dysplasia that occurs between the ages of three and four months, possibly later in the Malamute. The guard hairs of the trunk are progressively lost and the coat turns reddish in color.

In black or red Dobermanns, Miniature Pinschers, and Manchester Terriers there is a type of follicular dysplasia that occurs between the ages of one and four years. It begins in the flank and spreads to the back.
