= Corneal perforation =

Medical condition of the eye

- Specialty: Ophthalmology
- Symptoms: Difficulty seeing, eye pain
- Diagnostic method: Seidel test
- Treatment: Tissue adhesive, pressure bandage, or lamellar keratoplasty

Corneal perforation is an anomaly in the cornea resulting from damage to the corneal surface. A corneal perforation means that the cornea has been penetrated, thus leaving the cornea damaged.
The cornea is a clear part of the eye which controls and focuses the entry of light into the eye. Damage to the cornea due to corneal perforation can cause decreased visual acuity.

== Signs and symptoms ==
Corneal perforation may cause difficulty in seeing and persistent eye pain. Physical examination may reveal discoloration of the cornea.

== Causes ==
Perforation of the cornea may occur due to diseases of the cornea, injury during eye surgery, or infection of the eye, which may occur after surgery or procedures. Pellucid marginal degeneration may cause corneal thinning, leading to perforation.

== Diagnosis ==
Corneal perforation can be diagnosed by using the Seidel test. Any aqueous leakage is revealed during the Seidel test confirms corneal perforation. A fluorescence strip is wiped over the wound. If the clear aqueous humor from the eye runs through the yellow stain, the patient tests positive for corneal perforation.

== Treatment ==
The treatment of corneal perforation depends on the location, severity and the cause of damage

- Tissue adhesive can be used to seal small perforation, but this method cannot be used to treat perforations larger than 1 mm.
- Non infected corneal perforation generally heals when a pressure bandage is used.
- For certain types of corneal perforations, lamellar keratoplasty is used as treatment.
