= Erich Seidel (ophthalmologist) =

German ophthalmologist (1882–1946)

- Born: 30 December 1882; Apolda, Saxe-Weimar-Eisenach, German Empire
- Died: 26 February 1946 (aged 63); Jena, Soviet occupation zone in Germany
- Citizenship: Germany
- Known for: Seidel test, Seidel sign
- Scientific career
- Fields: ophthalmology

Erich Seidel (1882–1946) was a German ophthalmologist known for his studies in the field of glaucoma, ocular anesthesia and aqueous humor dynamics. Seidel test and Seidel's scotoma are named after him.

== Biography ==
Erich Seidel was born on December 30, 1882 in Apolda, Saxe-Weimar-Eisenach, in the German Empire (today Thuringia, Germany).

He received MD from Jena in 1907 (Topic: über die Lidbildung mittels übertragener stiellser Hautlappen (eyelid formation by means of transferred skin flaps)). After specialising in Ophthalmology during 1907–1910, he began working as an assistant at the University of Heidelberg Eye Clinic in 1910 and was appointed Head Physician in 1916 and Ausserordentlicher Professor in 1919. In 1935 he was offered to join at the University of Gottingen, but he rejected.

Receiving habitation in Heidelberg in 1914, his inaugural address was on the problems of spectacle glasses and solutions through modern spectacle optics.

He spent his last days in Jena, in the Soviet occupation zone in Germany. He died on February 26, 1946.

== Scientific contributions ==
Seidel studied the formation of aqueous humor in the ciliary body and the flow of aqueous humor through the Schlemm's canal, and attempted to explain the movement of aqueous humor experimentally. In the year 1914 Seidel invented a darkroom provocative test to detect glaucoma. In the same year he also described a glaucomatous Visual field defect which is now known as Seidel sign or Seidel's scotoma. In this scotoma the blind spot of the eye enlarges vertically into a sickle cell shape.

In 1921 he described a test to assess the presence of aqueous humor leakage from the anterior chamber of the eye, which is known as Seidel test now.

== Selected publications ==
- Seidel E. Beiträge zur Frühdiagnose des Glaukoms. Untersuchungen über das zentrale Gesichtsfeld mit Prüfungsobjekten unter kleinem Gesichtswinkel (Bjerrum). Albrecht von Graefes Archiv für Ophthalmologie. 1914; 88(1): 102-157
- Seidel E. Weitere experimentelle Untersuchungen uber die Quelle und den Verlauf der intraokularen Safstromung: XII. Ueber den manometrischen Nachweis des physiologischen Druckgefalles zwischen Voderkammer und Schlemmschem Kanal. Archiv für Ophthalmologie. 1921;107:101-104.

== Awards and honours ==
Seidel was awarded with von Graefe-Preis in 1925 by the German Ophthalmological Society.
