= Vitzthum =

Vitzthum is a surname. Notable people with the surname include:

- Franz Vitzthum, German countertenor
- Hildegard Temporini-Gräfin Vitzthum (1939–2004), a German historian
- Michael Vitzthum (born 1992), German footballer
- Simon Vitzthum (born 1995), Swiss cyclist
- Virginia Vitzthum, American anthropologist
- Karl M. Vitzthum (1880–1967), American architect
