= Apolda station =

Railway station in Apolda, Germany

Apolda
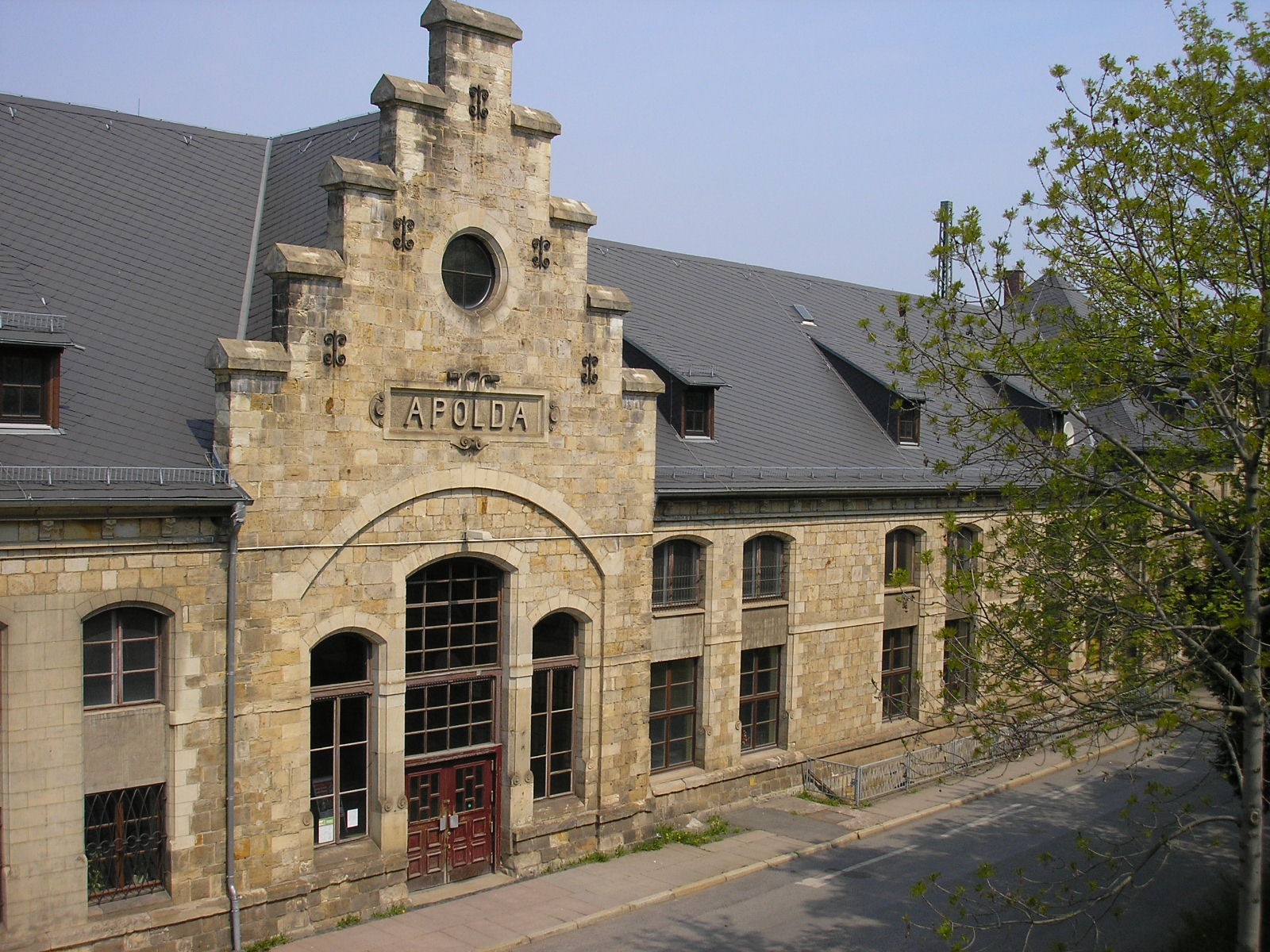
- Entrance building

General information
- Location: Bahnhofstr. 69, Apolda, Thuringia; Germany
- Coordinates: 51°01′51″N 11°31′34″E
- Owner: Deutsche Bahn
- Operator: DB Station&Service
- Line: Halle–Bebra railway
- Platforms: 3

Construction
- Accessible: Yes
- Architect: Schmandt
- Architectural style: Renaissance revival

Other information
- Station code: 166
- DS100 code: UAP
- IBNR: 8011051
- Category: 4
- Website: www.bahnhof.de

History
- Opened: 1 April 1890

Services
Preceding station	Abellio Rail Mitteldeutschland	Following station
Weimar towards Erfurt Hbf	RE 16	Großheringen towards Halle (Saale) Hbf
Oßmannstedt towards Eisenach	RB 20	Niedertrebra towards Leipzig Hbf
Location
- Location within Thuringia Location within Germany Location within Europe

Apolda station is a through station on the Halle–Bebra railway in the town of Apolda in the German state of Thuringia. It was opened on 1 April 1890 and Deutsche Bahn assigns it to category 4.

== Location ==
The station is located on the edge of the Heusdorf district at the north-eastern end of Bahnhofstraße. The terrain is bounded to the south and west by Bahnhofstraße ("station street") and to the north by Sulzaer Straße. The former track field was located to the north of the through station, as well as to the east and west of the platforms. The distance to the city centre is approximately 1 kilometre. Apolda is located at line-kilometre 71.68.

== History ==
=== The entrance building of 1846 ===
It is not known exactly when the first entrance building in Apolda was built and inaugurated. The building had two storeys and was built in the Neoclassical style. The station had 1st, 2nd and 3rd class waiting rooms, two restaurants, a ticket counter and an office for handling telegraph services and luggage. Before the construction of the signal box, the station's signalling system was accommodated in the entrance building. On the upper floor, there was an apartment for the station master as well as other rooms for the railway staff.

=== The entrance building of 1890 ===
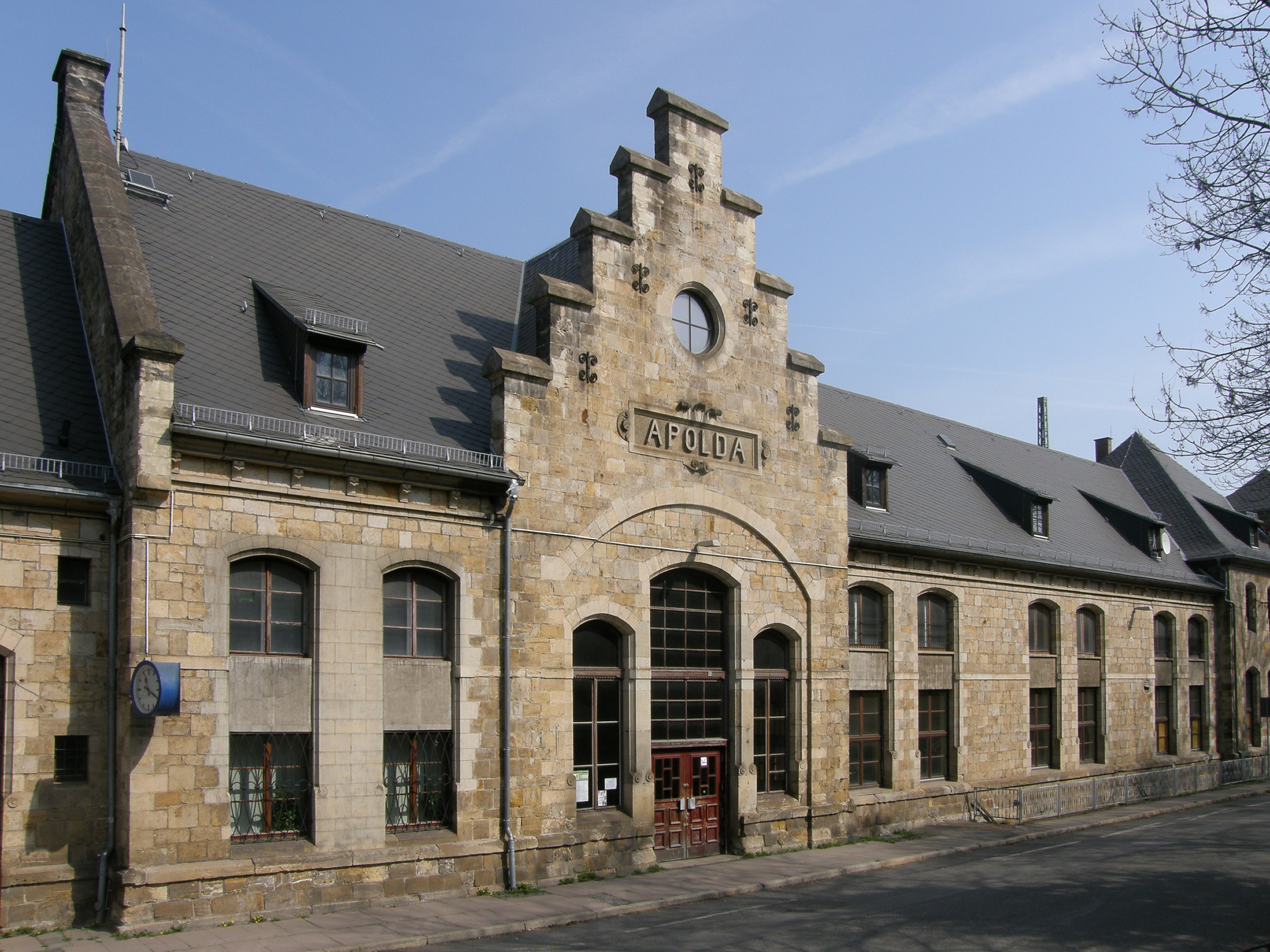
Street view of the entrance building

The original Apolda station was destroyed by a great fire on the night of 24/25 September 1884.

The Royal Railway Division of (Königliche Eisenbahndirektion) of Erfurt then decided to build a shed on the town side of the railway yard, in order to accommodate various offices and dining facilities there. This half-timbered building came from Roßlau, which is now part of Dessau-Rosslau and is located in Saxony-Anhalt. A temporary building was demolished and reconstructed in Apolda. This temporary station building, which was located between the present station and the goods yard, was commissioned on Sunday, 14 December 1884. Only two years later a plan for a new station building was presented by the Railway Division of Erfurt. This action had been preceded by numerous reminders and complaints by citizens and traders who were no longer willing to accept the bad connection with the rail network. Three years later, on 4 February 1889, construction of the new station started on the foundations of the walls of the old, burned-down station. As early as 12 August of the same year, the construction of the central building was prefabricated, and soon afterwards it was delivered to Apolda. The new station was opened on 1 April 1890. The building is built entirely of sandstone, in a style that is a mixture of German and Italian Neo-Renaissance. It is decorated by small towers and ornamental gables.

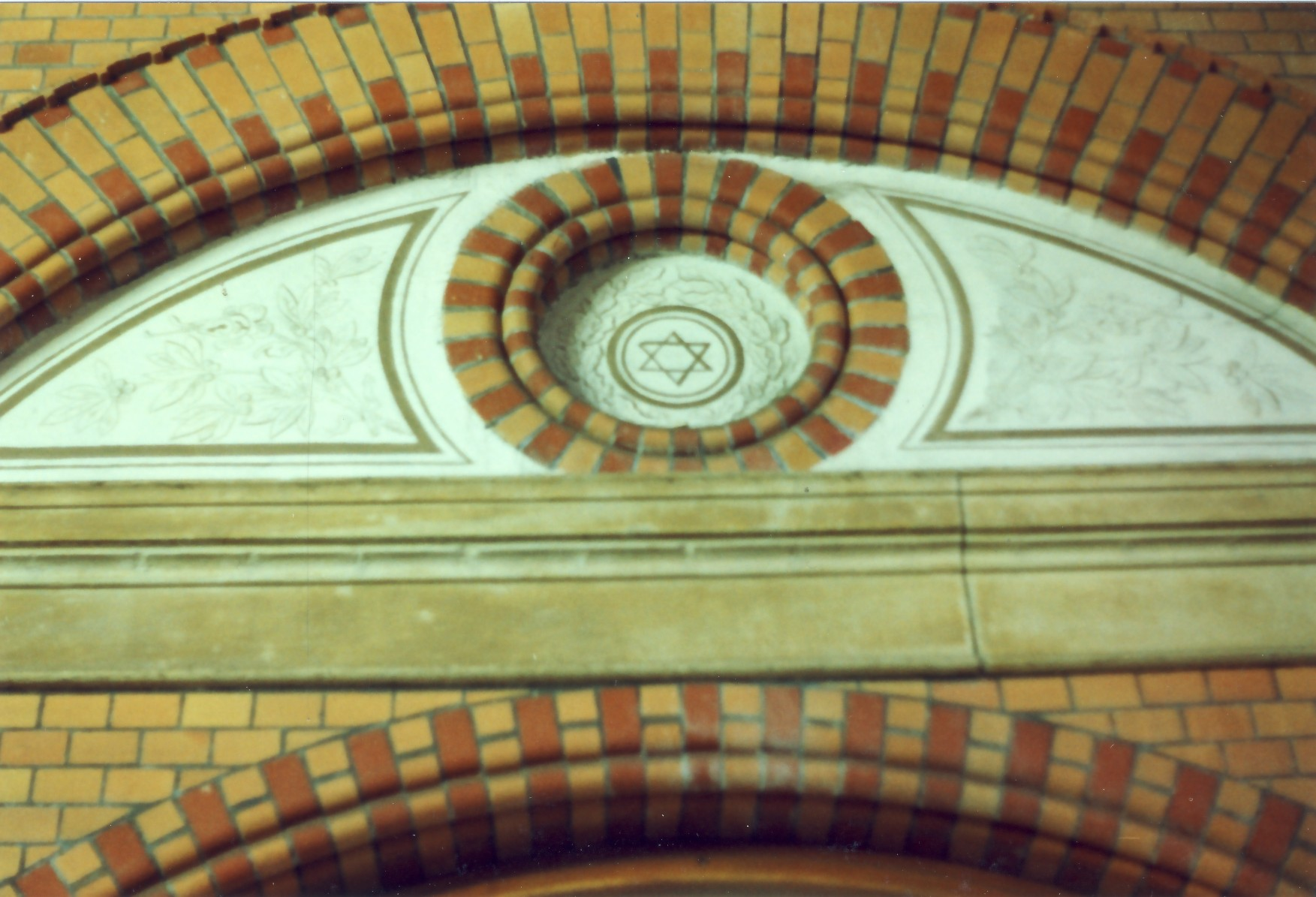
Interior painting with Star of David in a rosette

Between 1905 and 1908, the platforms’ surfaces were covered and canopies were installed. This happened as a result of a petition from the town of Apolda to the Railway Division of Erfurt. In 1906 an underpass was also built between both platforms. In the First World War, the railway was used as a war service centre, for which some barracks were built. During this period, a lavatory block was also established. It was demolished at the turn of the year of 1922/1923 because of the excessive odour.

One of the special features of the interior of the building, which is built of clinker brick, is its decoration with signs from the symbolism of Freemasonry, but also of a Star of David, which was not a traditional symbol of the lodge. The significance of this symbol is still unclear.

== The current station ==
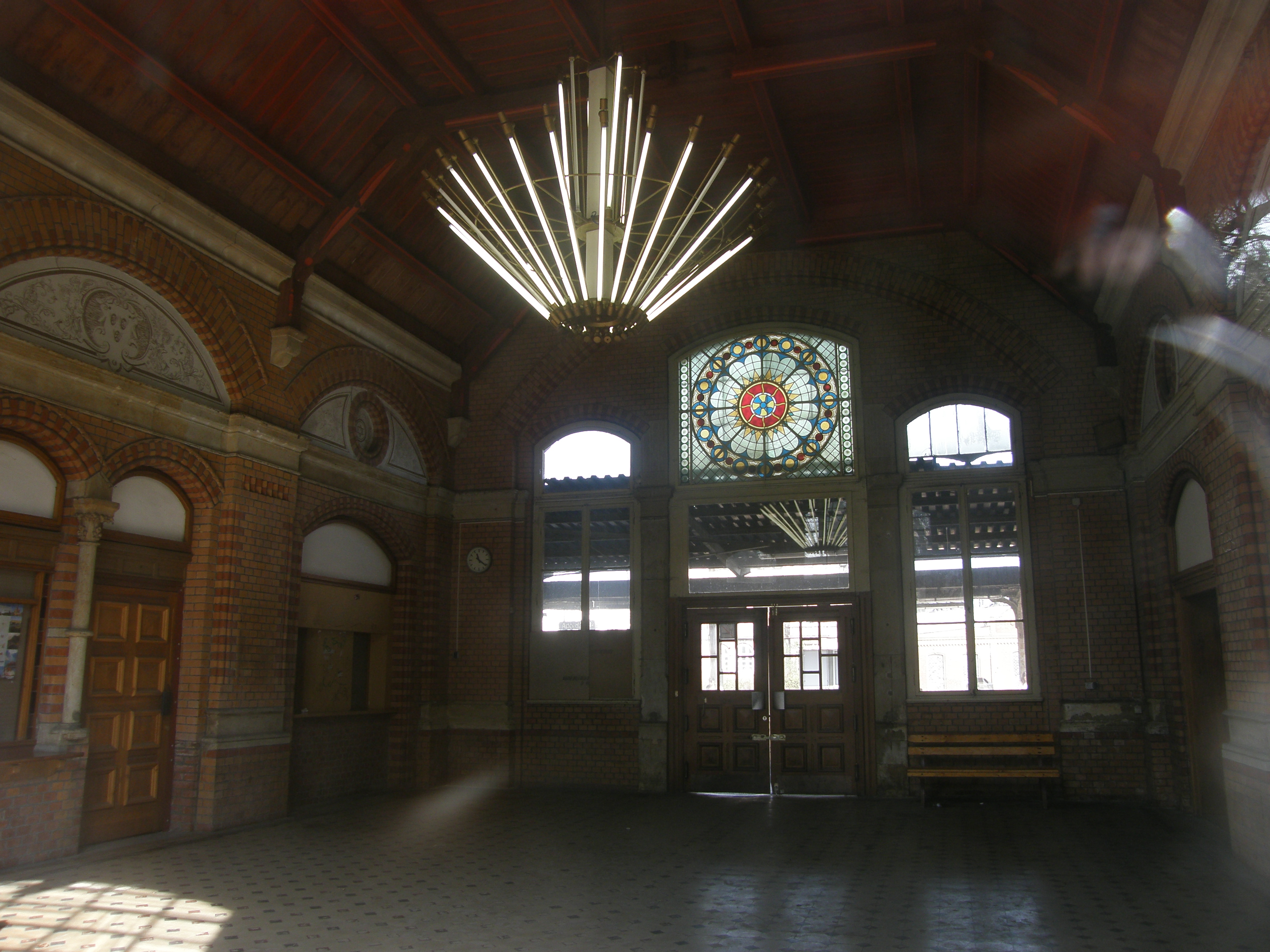
Entrance hall

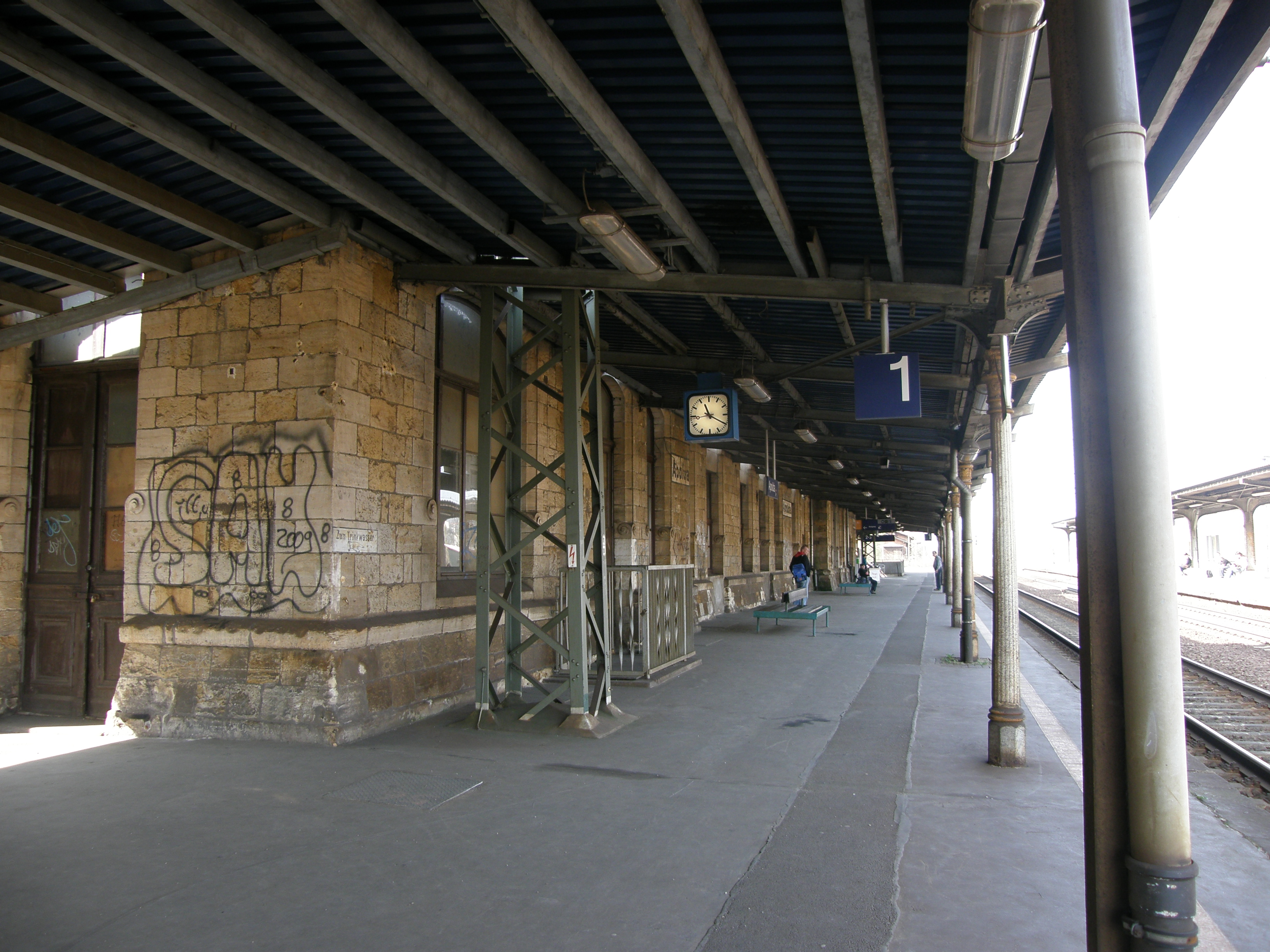
"House" platform before upgrade, 2009

=== Entrance building and platforms ===
The entrance building was last renovated in 1988/1989. The outer facade was cleaned and the interiors were refurbished. As early as 1953, the previously open ticket office space was subdivided into several work spaces and a false ceiling was installed. The ticket offices are only occupied part-time during the week. Toilets are not available. There is a kiosk in the lobby. Parts of the premises are also used by a taxi company and by the town of Apolda for seminars. The marshalling yard, which was located directly next to the passenger station on its eastern side, has been closed and demolished.

The line is controlled by an electronic interlocking in Apolda.

The "house" platform (next to the entrance building) was 297 metres long and 34 centimetres high. Like the other platform, it was roofed and surfaced between 1905 and 1908. The underpass between both platforms was built in 1906. The platform between tracks 2 and 3 is 377 metres long and 55 centimetres high.

Between October 2012 and the autumn of 2013, the station was modernised in several phases of construction and upgraded for barrier-free access. First, the pedestrian underpass was rebuilt and platform 1 was rebuilt. Subsequently, platforms 2 and 3 were rebuilt. The platforms were equipped with ramps, lifts, weather shelters and tactile paving. The extension of the pedestrian underpass created an access to a planned public transport interchange. Travel information is displayed on a passenger information system. The costs amounted to around €5.5 million.

Platform	Length in m	Height in cm	Use
1	245	55	Service towards Großheringen
2	245	55	Service towards Weimar
3	175	55	Individual services

=== Station forecourt ===
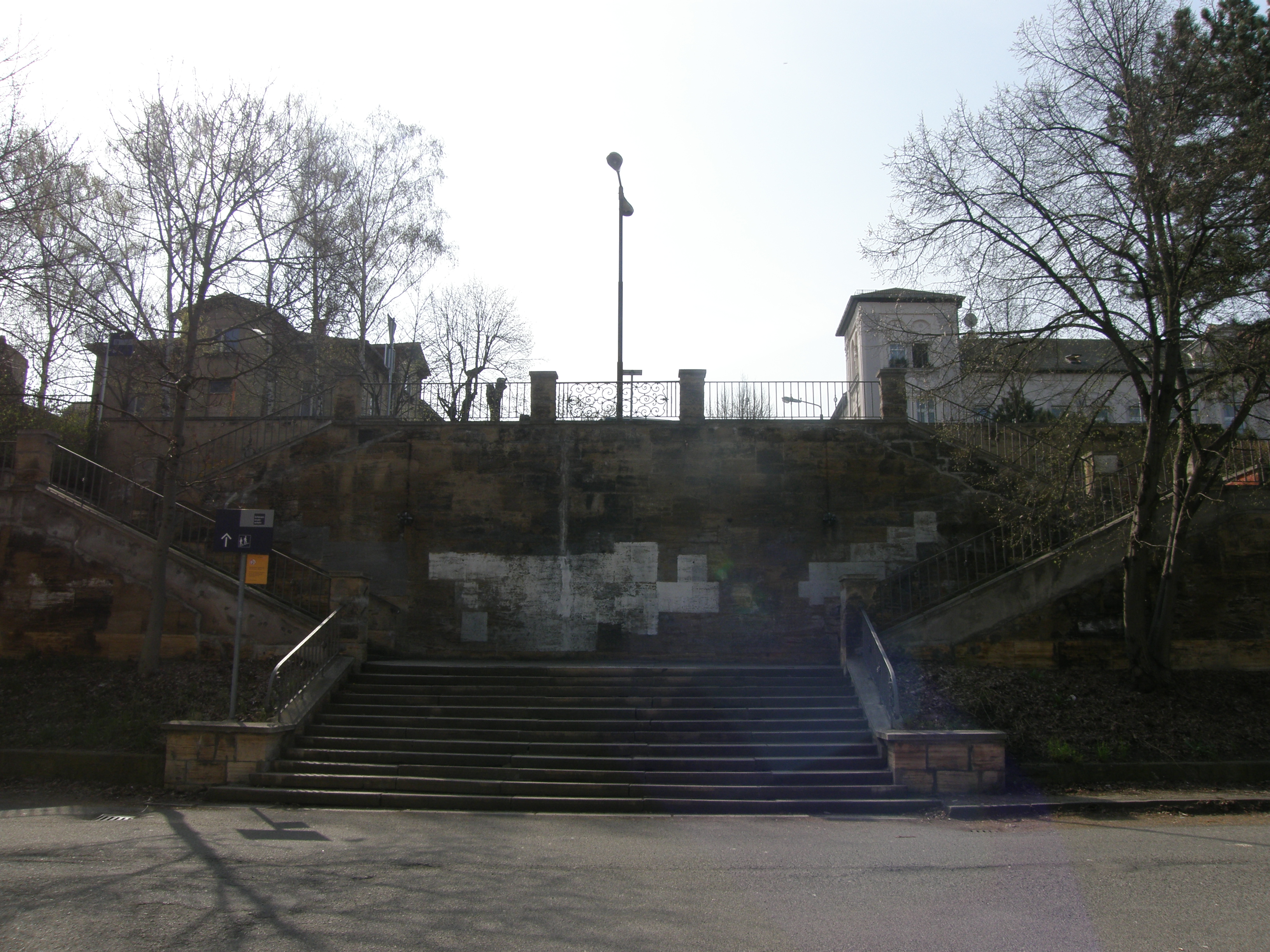
Staircase

Apolda station has no direct forecourt, only an entrance road, which connects a turning loop with Bahnhofstraße. This was last renovated in 1989 on the occasion of the 100th anniversary of the station. The left and right side of the road is used for paid parking, a bus stop and a taxistand. A further entrance to this street and the station is possible via the staircase built in 1934 out of Ehringsdorf Kalksandstein (brick made from sand and calcium silicate hydrate).

=== Modernisation of the station environment ===
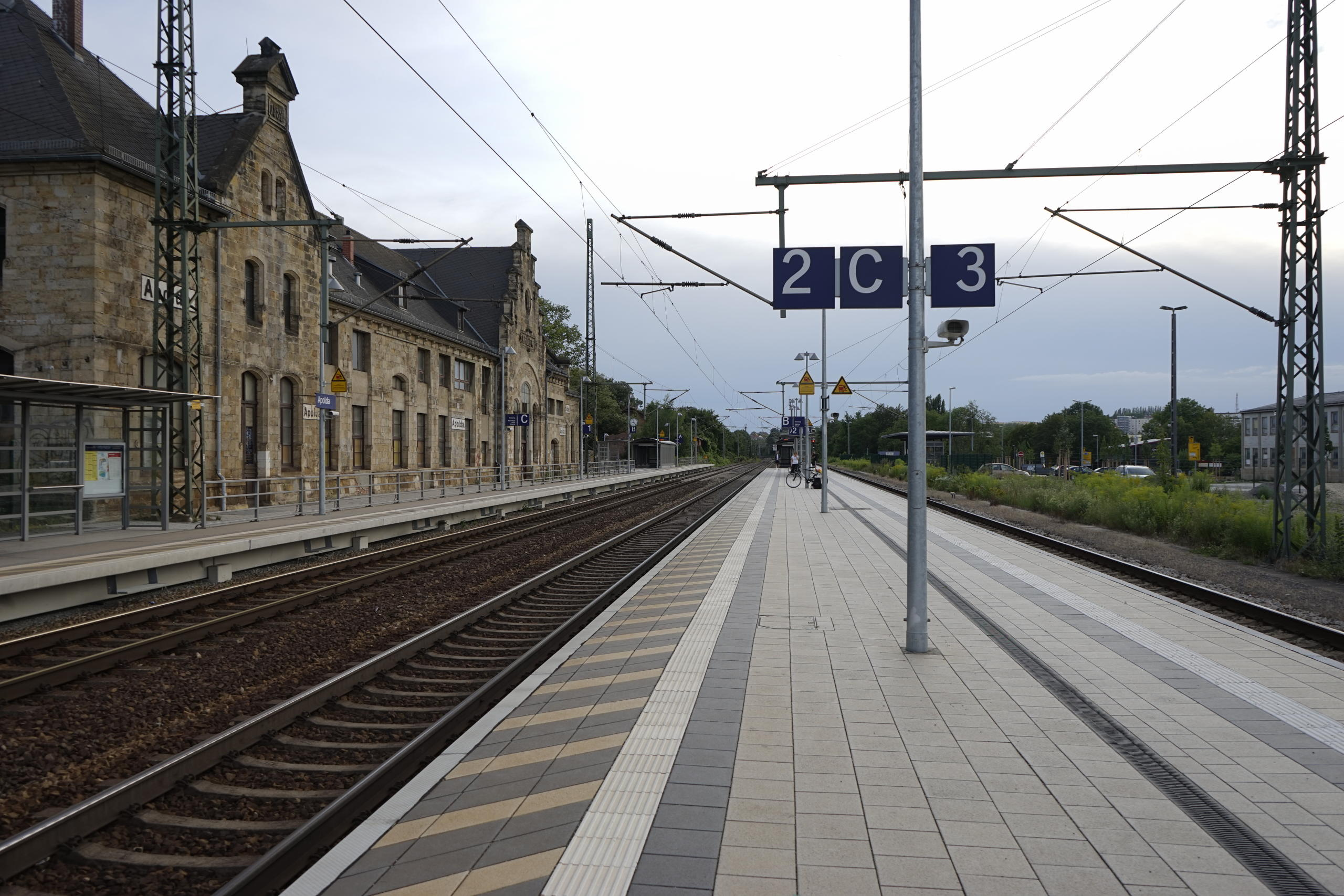
Station in 2015

In 2014, the municipality of Apolda, in cooperation with Deutsche Bahn, established a park-and-ride parking lot on the former railway track to the north of the station. There are car and bus parking areas as well as a bus stop. The platform underpass was extended to connect the platform with the new parking spaces. The symbolic groundbreaking ceremony took place on the grounds of the former freight station on 29 February 2012.

== Services ==
Apolda station is on the Halle–Bebra railway, which is also colloquially called the Thüringer Bahn (Thuringian Railway), and is served hourly. On Fridays and Sundays, there are individual IC services on the Halle–Fulda–Frankfurt/Würzburg route.

Since the Apolda station is located well outside the city centre and the larger residential areas, it is necessary for many passengers to continue by bus. Directly in front of the station building—in front of the entrance to the P+R-parking area—is the Bahnhof stop, which is served twice a day by so-called midibuses. At a distance of about 100 metres is the Freitreppe stop, which is served 45 times on workdays and 15 times on weekends.

== Memorial ==
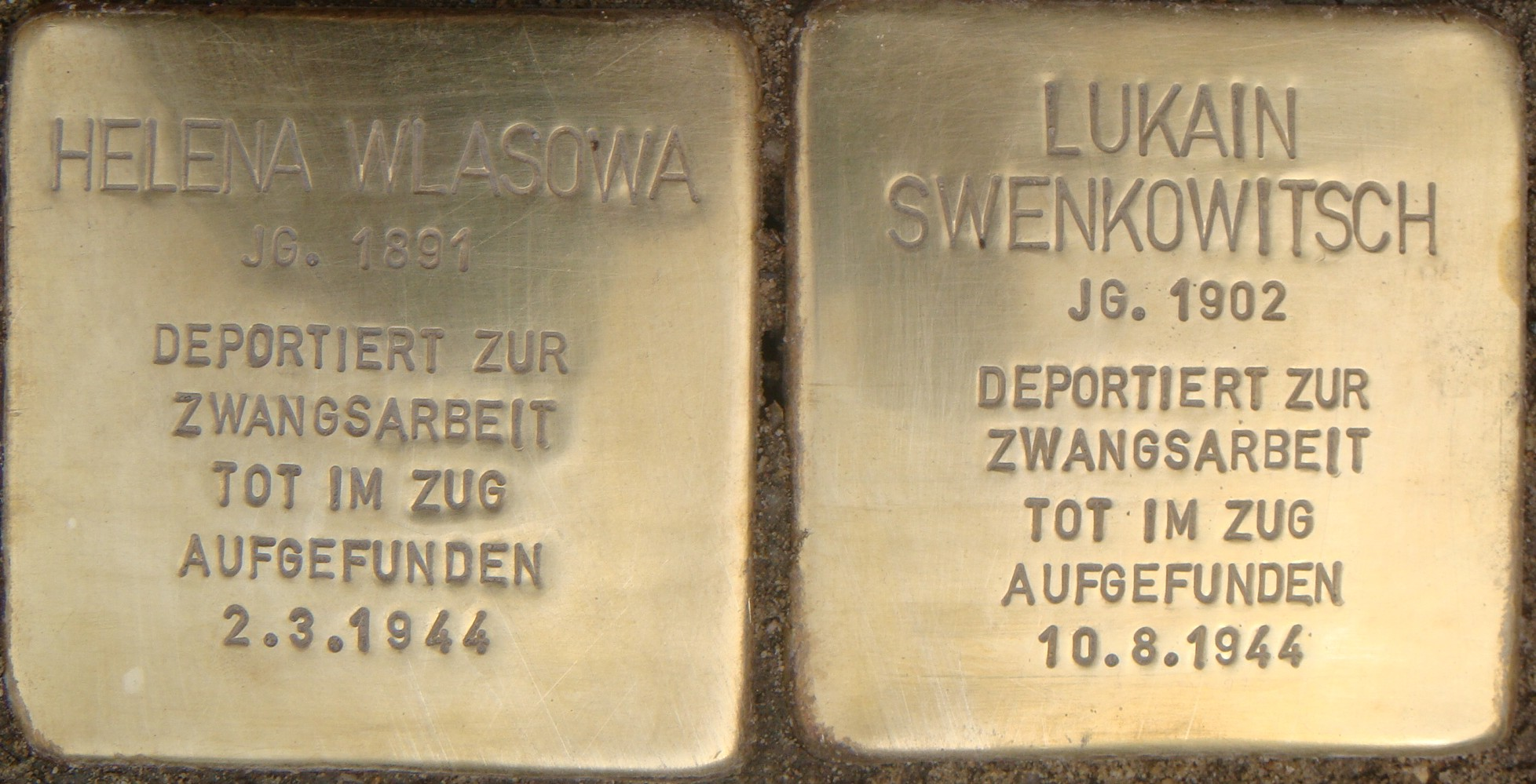
Stolpersteine for victims of forced labour

The function of the station during the Second World War has been recalled since 18 August 2009 by two so-called "Stolpersteine" (stumbling blocks), which was placed by the Cologne action artist Gunter Demnig before the main entrance at the suggestion of the Apolda Prager house Association. These stones contain the names and dates of two Soviet forced labourers who were unloaded in March and August 1944 from the wagons on which Deutsche Reichsbahn transported hundreds of slaves to Apolda to work for armaments companies.
