= Prager house =

House in Thuringia, Jewish memorial

Coordinates: 51°01′30″N 11°30′49″E

Logo of the Prager house.

The Prager-Haus or Bernhard-Prager-Haus is the former home of the Jewish Prager family, situated in Apolda, Thuringia, Germany, in Pragergasse, a narrow alley.

== The Prager family and the history of Jews in Apolda ==
Bernhard Prager was born on June 28, 1888, and was killed on September 26, 1944, in the Theresienstadt concentration camp. He lived with his family in the house, which he owned, until they were deported. The Prager family in its entirety became victims of the Shoa. The Aryanization of the family's property is documented in a book with historical primary sources published by the Thüringer Landeszentrale für politische Bildung (Thuringia State Agency for Political Education).

== The association and the memorial project ==
An association founded in January 2007 attempted to preserve the house as a location of remembrance and commemoration to the Jewish inhabitants of Apolda. The group educates the public about antisemitism documents the Holocaust. The association promotes research into the cultural and social history of the region of Weimar-Apolda, especially that of social, religious and political minorities.

The association was preceded by 20 years of research. Material evidence from this time (artifacts) were collected, oral reports by contemporary witnesses were transcribed, contacts were established with escapees and their descendants. On Bernhard Prager's 100th birthday on June 29, 1988, a memorial plaque commemorating this family was placed on the house. A book was published in 1991 that gives an overview over Jewish life in Apolda.

In 1999 the association Geschichtswerkstatt Weimar-Apolda was founded, later merged into the Prager-Haus Association, and published further material regarding Jewish life, persecution in the first Thuringia concentration camps in Nohra and Bad Sulza and the daily regime of National Socialism.

Prominent advocates for the group include Apolda mayor Rüdiger Eisenbrand and Wolfgang Peller, a Jew from Apolda persecuted during Nazism, who later became deputy minister of justice of the GDR (East Germany) and now lives in Berlin.

Efforts to purchase the house began soon after the founding of the association. In 2008 the association began publishing a series describing the destiny of affected families, resistance against Nazism and the life of minorities in town.

In May 2008 Gunter Demnig, performance artist from Cologne, placed the first three Stolpersteine (stumbling blocks) in front of the Prager Haus. In October nine more blocks were placed. At various city festivals and public events the association turned to the public with information booths, also offering souvenirs for financing the project.

== Publications of the Prager-Haus Association and the Geschichtswerkstatt Weimar-Apolda ==
- Thomas Bahr: Die Rosewitz, Prager, Lichtenstein... . Apolda 1992
- Peter Franz: Der gewöhnliche Faschismus. Über die alltägliche Herrschaft der "Nationalsozialisten" am Beispiel einer Mittelstadt des Deutschen Reiches. Eine Chronologie in Jahresscheiben. Weimar 2001, ISBN 3-935275-00-5
- Peter Franz, Udo Wohlfeld: Jüdische Familien in Apolda. Diffamierung, Ausgrenzung, Entrechtung, Vertreibung, Deportation, Vernichtung, Ungehorsam. Die Apoldaer Judenheit während des Faschismus, Weimar 2006, ISBN 3-935275-04-8
- Peter Franz, Tina Unglaube, Udo Wohlfeld: Die Pragers. Eine jüdische Familie in Apolda. Geschichtswerkstatt Weimar-Apolda e.V., Apolda 2008, ISBN 3-935275-07-2
- Karl Berger, Peter Franz, Udo Wohlfeld: August Berger. Sozialdemokrat in Apolda. Geschichtswerkstatt Weimar-Apolda e.V., Apolda 2008, ISBN 3-935275-08-0
- Wolfgang Peller, Peter Franz, Udo Wohlfeld: Die Pellers. Eine jüdische Familie in Apolda. Geschichtswerkstatt Weimar-Apolda e.V., Apolda 2008, ISBN 3-935275-10-2
