= Seidel sign =

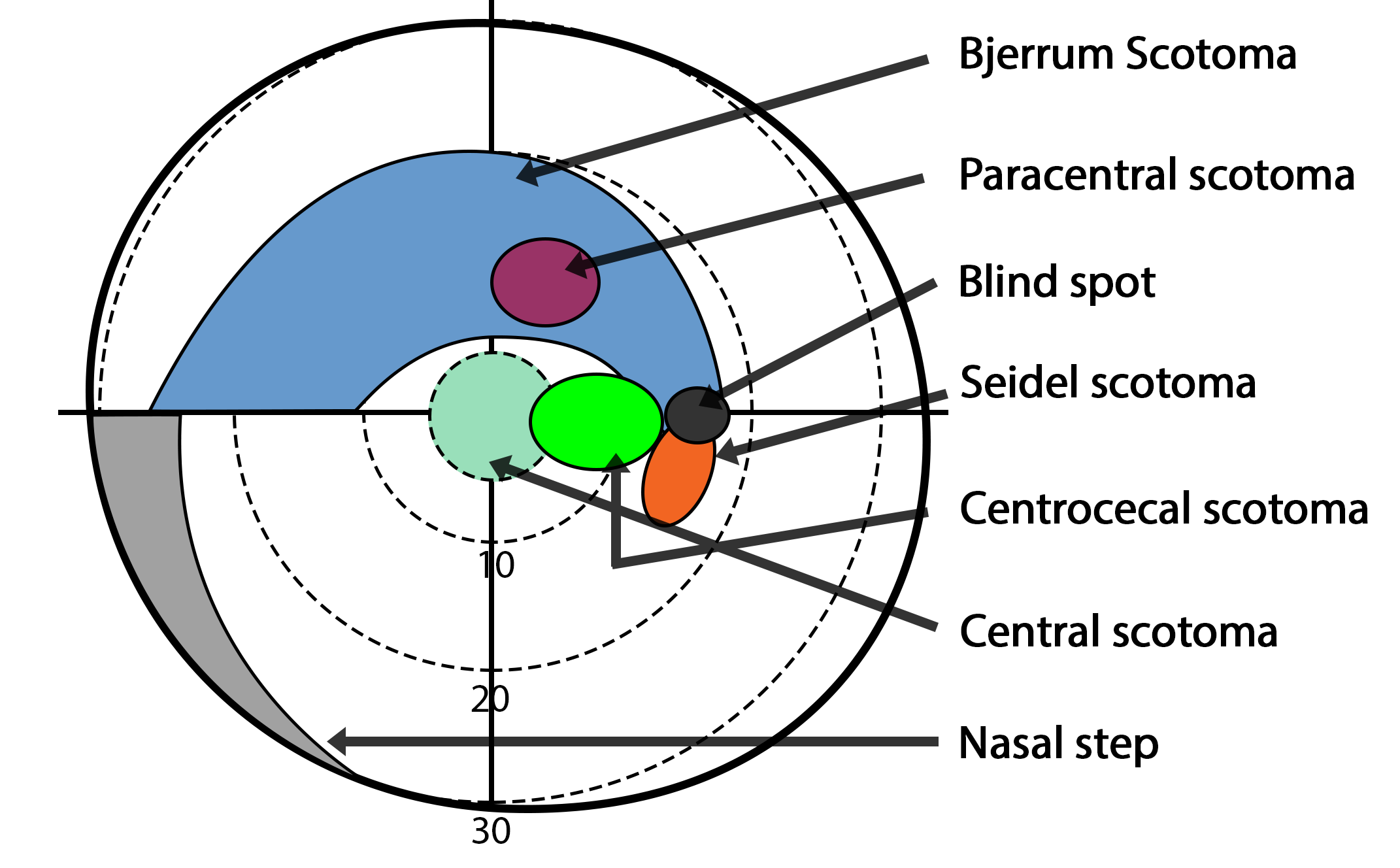
- A visual description of the sites of different types of scotomas on the retina.Seidels sign is marked with orange
- Differential diagnosis: glaucoma

Seidel's sign (also called Seidel's scotoma) is a sickle-shaped scotoma that is a superior or inferior extension of the blind spot. It occurs in some patients with glaucoma.

== History ==
In 1914, German ophthalmologist Erich Seidel first described the glaucomatous visual field defect, Seidel's scotoma.
