= Doberman (band) =

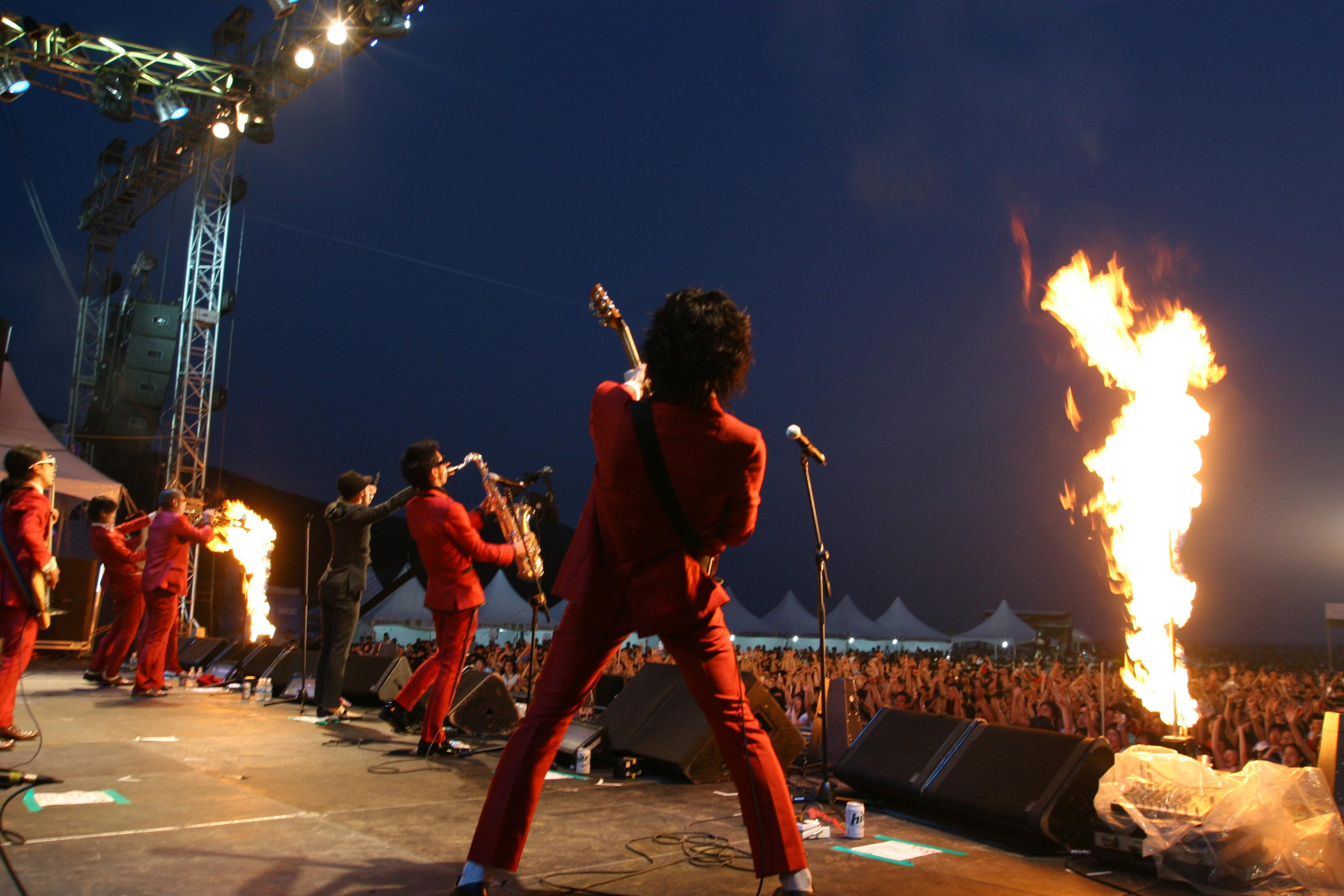
- Doberman in 2007

Background information
- Origin: Osaka, Japan
- Genres: Ska, punk, 2 tone, neoska
- Years active: 1998–present
- Members: Takashi Yoshida; Mitsuhiro "Gaki" Kitagaki; Kunihito "Swe" Suehiro; Shinya "Goe" Kawagoe; Kenji Hara; Yasuhiro Koyama; Takuro Hirai; Yusuke Tanaka; Yoshifumi Kishikawa

Doberman is a Japanese ska/punk band. In 1998, the members of Doberman initially came together while studying art at Osaka University. However, the band did not fully launch and emerge into the music world until a year later. This nine member ensemble undoubtedly contributes to Japan's ska scene, especially influencing the 2 Tone and Neoska subgenres, flavored by their own mixture of two tone and authentic ska.

Their first mini-album Ska Before Sunrise was released in 2000, followed by a second single, "Tsuki" in 2001. In 2002, "Leap for Joy", "Moonstruck Drunker", and "Game" came out one per month consecutively as their third, fourth, and fifth singles, respectively. These releases were coupled with the success of their first nationwide tour throughout Japan.

February 2003 saw the anticipated release of Doberman's first full album Zara Zara Texture. With continuing momentum, Doberman embarked on another tour, this time leaving their island home behind to play Europe. Even Japan's most successful artists face many challenges in overseas distribution and touring, thus this was indeed a notable feat in Doberman's history. While in Europe, Doberman impressed the Latin ska scenes throughout Italy and Spain with their unforgettably spicy live shows, including at the ska event Street Beat Festival, attended by thousands and featuring bands Banda Bassotti and Capdown.

A year after the release of Zara Zara Texture, Doberman's single "Shashou wa Nekorondamama" was a major debut for the band and perhaps one of their biggest hits to date. A professional music video was made from this single, employing striking cultural images of Japan, as well as artwork by close friend to the band. Overseas, word had spread from the band's tour the previous year, and requests reached Osaka for the band to return to rock the Mediterranean. During April, Doberman toured Italy again, appearing on Italian TV and radio, as well as in newspaper and magazine articles, every one praising Doberman's performances, proving another tour successful.

Immediately upon returning to Japan, Doberman headlined King of Ska, the largest ska event in western Japan in its third year. Then in May came the release of their expectant second album Kieta Kyouken to Sore ni Matsuwaru Uwasa, and following soon after in June they kicked off their first country-wide tour in two years. As a kind of tribute Exhibition Doberman Europe Tour 2004 displayed photography and videos from the tour and went up in July. Partnered with the exhibition was Moonstruck Jamboree Special, an event that welcomed well over a thousand visitors.

More media attention came their way when Doberman was featured on Kansai TV's Standup! program over a four-week period, showing their documented tour in Europe. Doberman also took this opportunity to advertise their new album Leap for Joy. In September, Doberman joined a Fred Perry compilation with a new song, "My Ska Generation". Doberman performed alongside The Busters (Germany) that November in 2tone Time, Japan's biggest ska event.

Doberman's 2005 releases include their single "Akai Taiyo/Megami no Ju" in July (7 inch in September), and their next full album Cu d'Etat in September. The band continued touring around Japan through 2006, also taking part in Festa de Rama, a two-day peace concert on the Hiroshima bombing anniversary in both 2005 and 2006. Their most recent album is Zah!Zah!Zah! released in September 2006. Since then the band has been promoting this latest release. In December they headlined with special guests bands and artists at Big Cat Osaka, another two-day event. Doberman plans to build on their popularity in Japan and hopes to expand in other parts of the world. They are looking to the United States as their next overseas destination.

== Discography ==
Albums/CDs

- Zah!Zah!Zah!
- Cu d'Etat
- Kieta Kyouken to Sore ni Matsuwaru Uwasa
- Zara Zara Texture
- Ska Before Sunrise (mini album)
- Especial Doberman – 10th Anniversary The Best Album

Singles

- Akai Taiyo
- Shashou wa Nekorondamama
- Game
- Moonstruck Drunker
- Leap for Joy
- Tsuki

Compilations

- My Ska Generation (Bella Ciao)
- Ska Foundation (Donten No Hana)
- Tribute to Operation Ivy (Bomb Shell)
- Mo' Down Beat (Hidarikikino Waltz)
- Skamikaze (Wa-Kyoku)
- Skankin' Jammin (Wa-Kyoku)
- Ska Bash (Doberman Ska)
- Step and Beat Vol. 1 (Dog Fight)

== Lineup ==
- Takashi Yoshida – lead vocals
- Mitsuhiro Gaki Kitagaki – saxophone, vocals
- Kunihito Swe Suehiro – trombone
- Shinya Goe Kawagoe – trumpet
- Kenji Hara keyboards, accordion
- Yasuhiro Koyama – drums
- Takuro Hirai – guitar, harmonica, vocals
- Yusuke Tanaka – guitar
- Yoshifumi Kishikawa – bass
