= Dobermann =

Black and tan dog breed from Germany

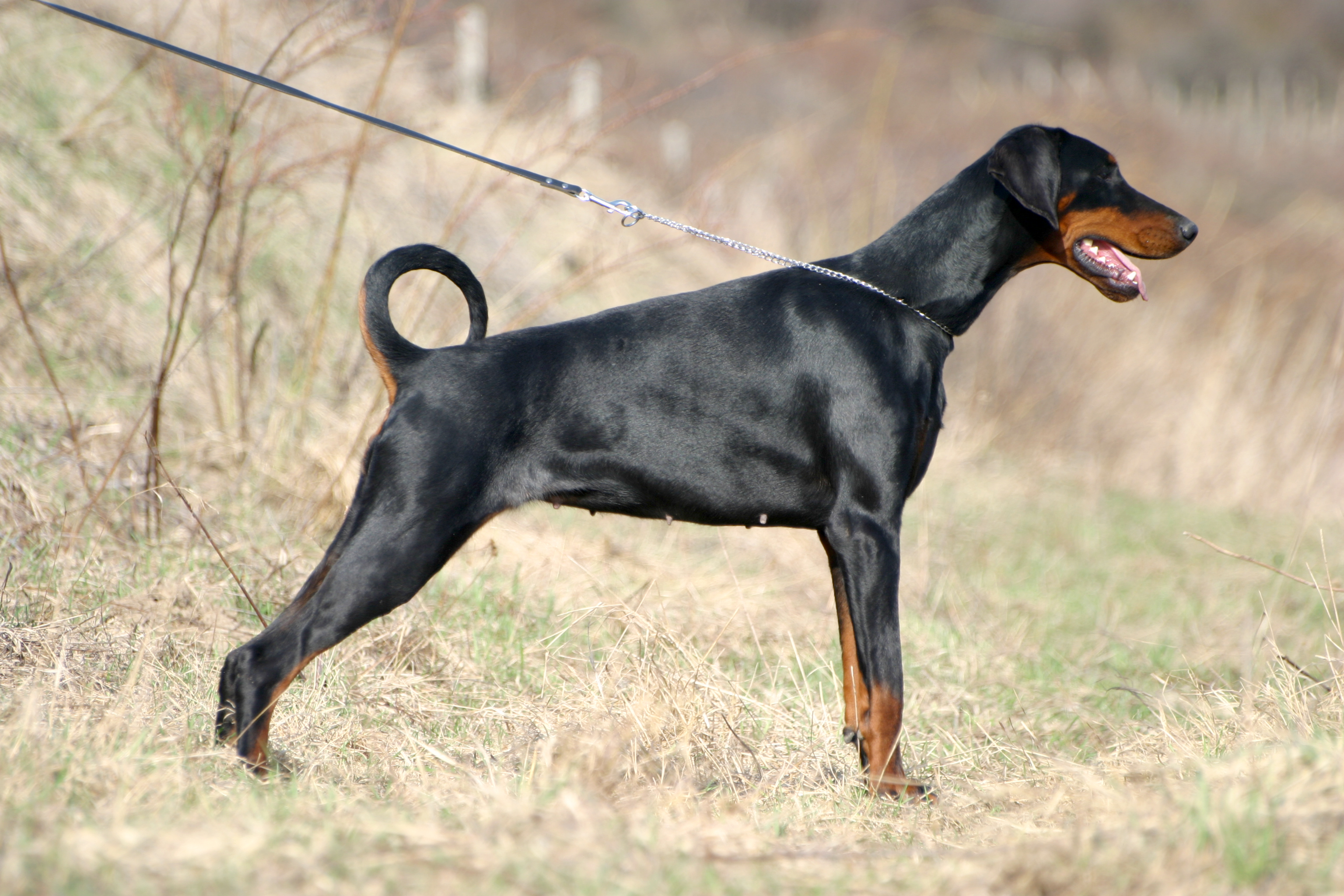
- Adult bitch, with full ears and tail
- Other names: Doberman Pinscher
- Origin: Germany
Traits
Height	Males	68–72 cm (27–28 in)
	Females	63–68 cm (25–27 in)
Weight	Males	40–45 kg (90–100 lb)
	Females	32–35 kg (70–75 lb)
- Coat: short
- Color: black & rust, red & rust, blue & rust, fawn (Isabella) & rust
Kennel club standards
- VDH: standard
- Fédération Cynologique Internationale: standard

The Dobermann (Note: /ˈdoʊbərmən/; German pronunciation: [ˈdoːbɐman]) is a German breed of working dog of pinscher type. In Canada and the United States it is known as the Doberman Pinscher. It was originally bred in Thuringia in about 1890 by Louis Dobermann, a tax collector. It has a long muzzle and – ideally – an even and graceful gait. The ears were traditionally cropped and the tail docked, practices which are now illegal in many countries.

The Dobermann is intelligent, alert and tenaciously loyal; it is kept as a guard dog or as a companion animal.

== History ==
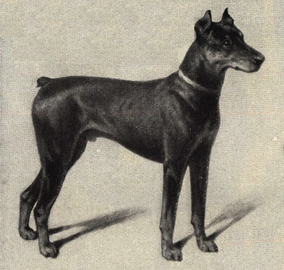
Dobermann, 1909

Dobermanns were first bred in the 1880s by Karl Friedrich Louis Dobermann, a tax collector who ran a dog pound in Apolda in present-day Thuringia in central Germany. With access to dogs of many breeds, he got the idea to create a breed that would be ideal for protecting him. He set out to breed a new type of dog that would exhibit impressive stamina, strength, and intelligence. Five years after Dobermann's death, Otto Goeller, one of the earliest breeders, created the National Doberman Pinscher Club and is considered to have perfected the breed, breeding and refining them in the 1890s.

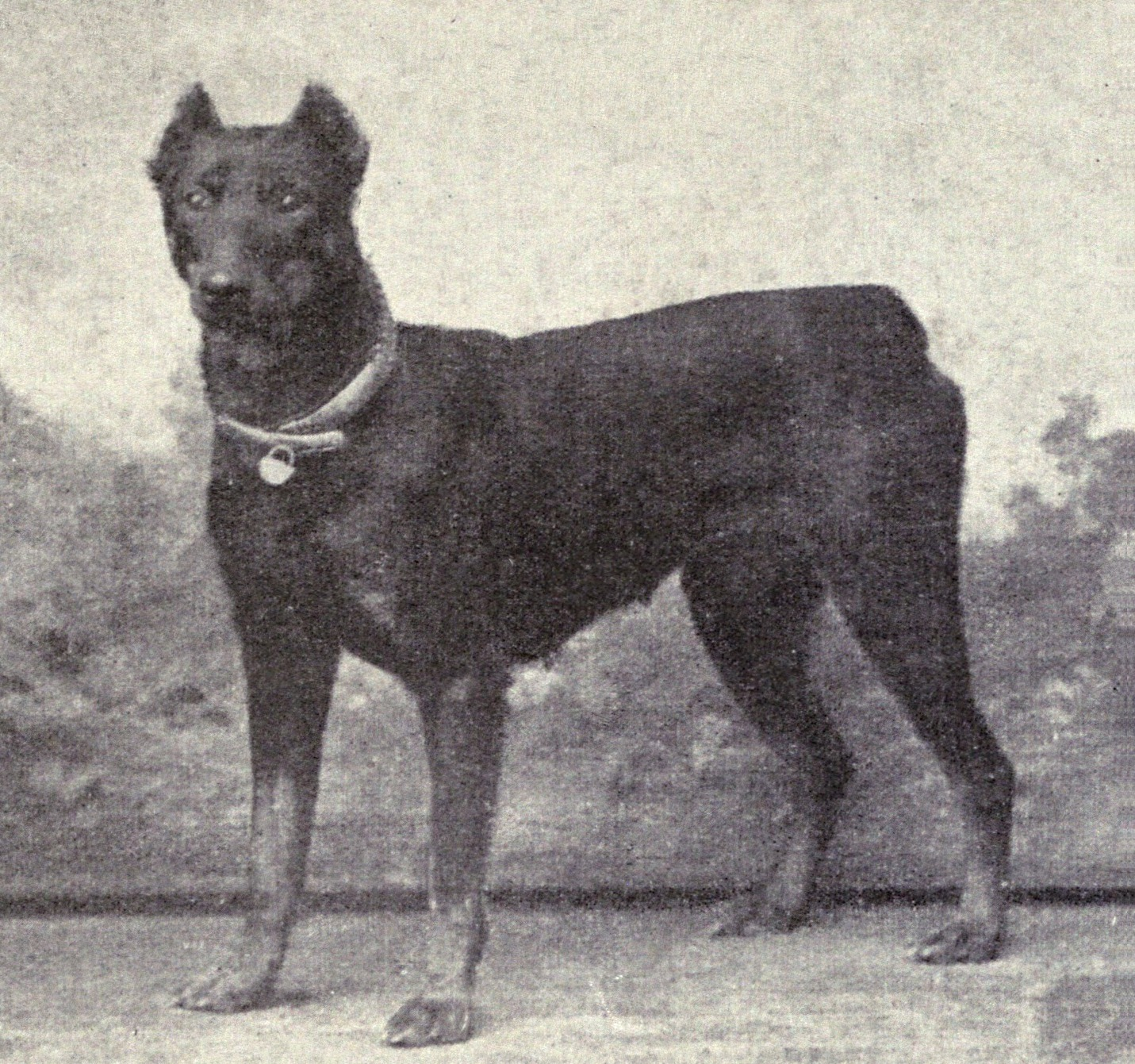
Dobermann Pinscher, 1915

The breed is believed to have been created from several different breeds of dogs that had the characteristics that Dobermann was looking for. The exact ratios of mixing, and even the exact breeds that were used, remain uncertain, although many experts believe that the Dobermann is a combination of several breeds including the Beauceron, German Pinscher, Rottweiler and Weimaraner. The single exception is the documented crossing with the Greyhound and Manchester Terrier. It is also widely believed that the old German Shepherd was the single largest contributor to the Dobermann breed. Philip Greunig's The Dobermann Pinscher (1939) describes the breed's early development by Otto Goeller, who helped to establish the breed. The American Kennel Club believes the breeds utilized to develop the Dobermann Pinscher may have included the old shorthaired shepherd, Rottweiler, Black and Tan Terrier and the German Pinscher.

After Dobermann's death in 1894, the Germans named the breed Dobermann-pinscher in his honor, but a half century later dropped the word 'pinscher' on the grounds that this German word for 'terrier' was no longer appropriate. The British did the same a few years later; now the US and Canada are the only countries who continue to use Pinscher and have dropped an "n" from Dobermann's surname.

During World War II, the United States Marine Corps used the Doberman Pinscher, alongside the German Shepherd, as war dogs.

In 2013 a list of breeds by annual number of registrations, based on a survey of member clubs of the Fédération Cynologique Internationale, placed the Dobermann 26th, with 20941 new registrations per year. Statistics compiled by the AKC for 2009 placed the Doberman Pinscher 15th, with 10233 registrations in that year. In the fifteen years from 2009 to 2023 the average number of puppies whelped per year in Germany was approximately 535, representing just under 1% of the average total number of births for all breeds, recorded at slightly more than 77000 per year.

== Characteristics ==
The Dobermann is a medium-large dog of pinscher type. Dogs stand some 68–72 cm at the withers, with a weight usually in the range 40–45 kg; bitches are considerably smaller, with height and weight ranges of 63–68 cm and 32–35 kg respectively. It is a working dog, and registration is subject to completion of a working trial.

It was originally intended as a guard dog, so males typically have a muscular and intimidating appearance.

=== Color ===
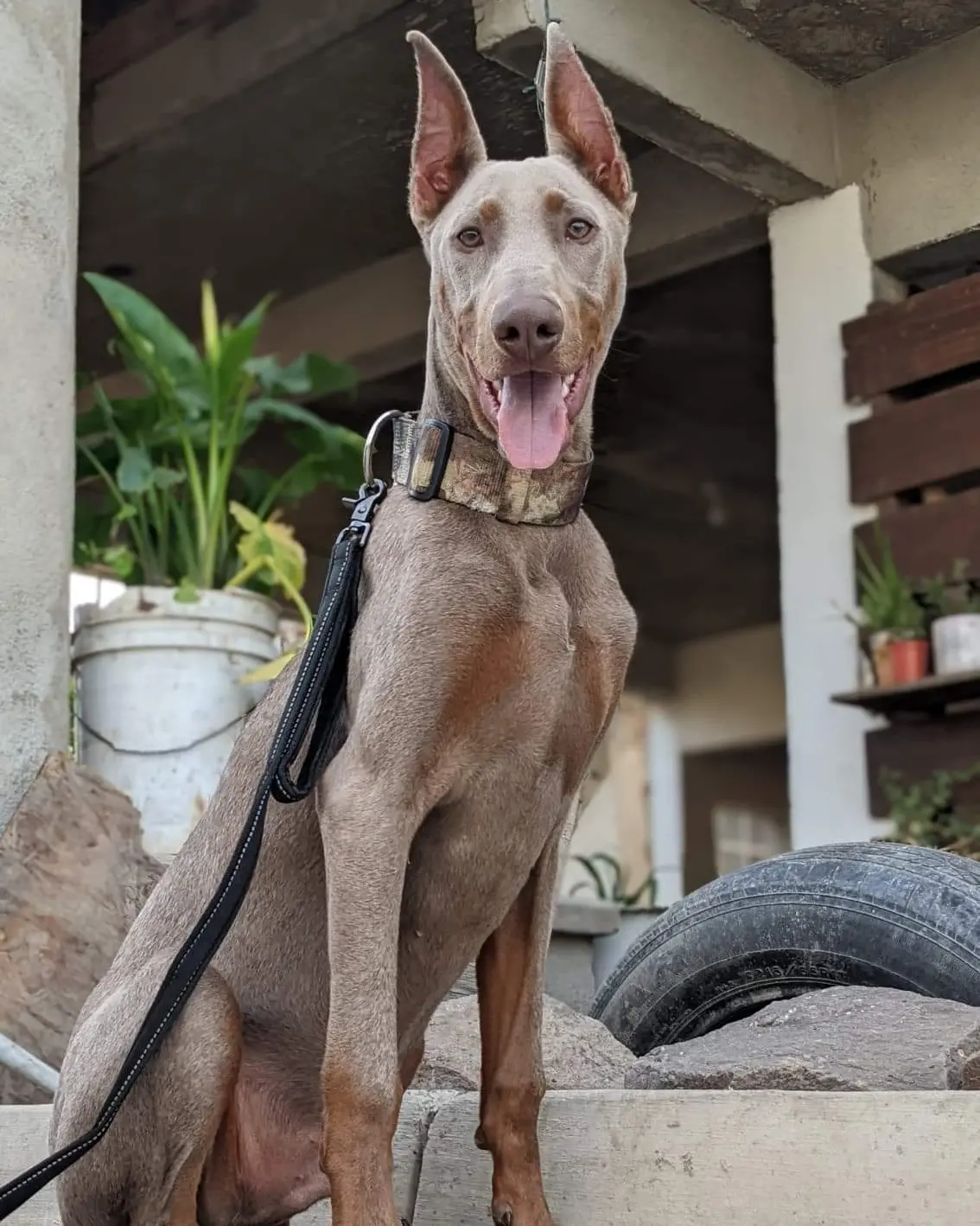
Fawn Dobermann Pinscher with cropped ears

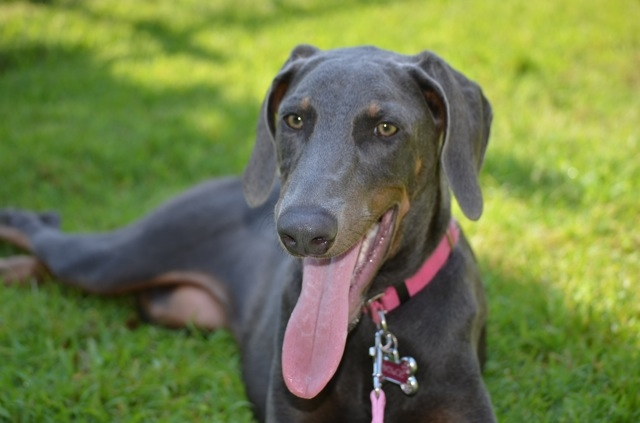
Blue Dobermann

Two different color genes exist in the Dobermann: one for black (B) and one for color dilution (D). There are nine possible combinations of these alleles, which can result in four different color phenotypes: black, blue, red, and fawn (Isabella). The traditional and most common color occurs when both the color and dilution genes have at least one dominant allele (i.e., BBDD, BBDd, BbDD or BbDd) and is commonly referred to as black, black and rust, or black and tan. The red, red rust, or brown coloration occurs when the black gene has two recessive alleles but the dilution gene has at least one dominant allele (i.e., bbDD, bbDd). The blue Dobermann has the color gene with at least one dominant allele and the dilution gene with both recessive alleles (i.e., BBdd or Bbdd). The fawn coloration is the least common, occurring only when both the color and dilution genes have two recessive alleles (i.e., bbdd). Thus, the blue color is a diluted black, and the fawn color is a diluted red.

Expression of the color dilution gene is a disorder called color dilution alopecia, a kind of canine follicular dysplasia. Although not life-threatening, these dogs can develop skin problems.

White Doberman are cream in color with blue eyes and pink noses, paw pads, and eye rims. The first white Doberman was born in 1976. White Doberman were identified as albino, and the condition is caused by a partial deletion in the SLC45A2 gene. Although albino Doberman are prone to suffer long term issues including photosensitivity/photophobia, skin lesions/tumors, and solar skin damage, there is no evidence suggesting this mutation causes deafness.

=== Tail ===
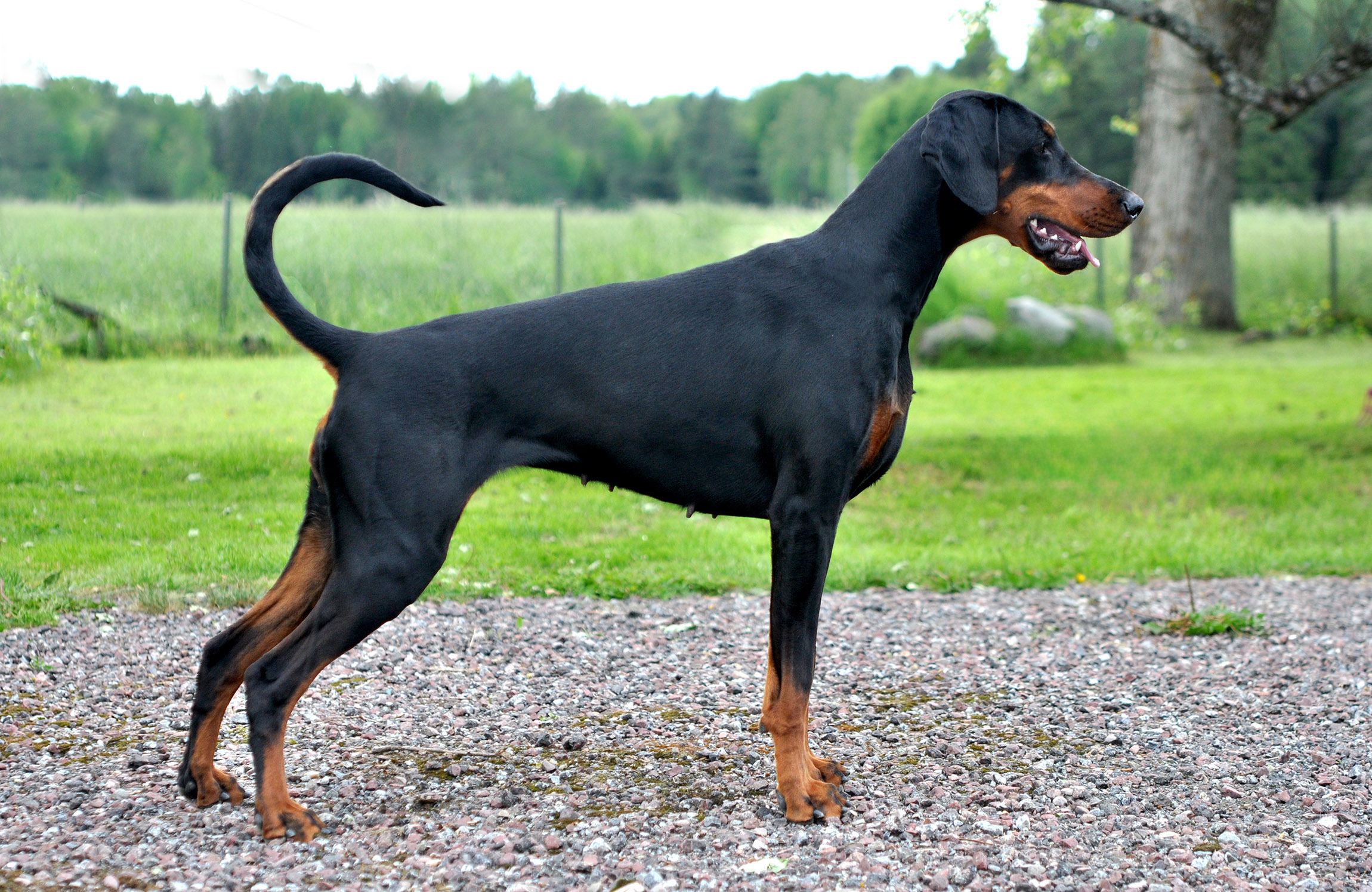
Dobermann with full tail

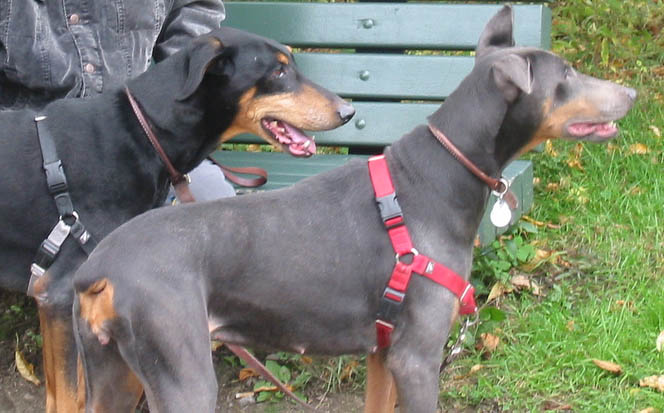
Blue Dobermann with docked tail

The Dobermann's natural tail is fairly long, but individual dogs often have a short tail as a result of docking, a procedure in which the majority of the tail is surgically removed shortly after birth.

The practice of docking has been around for centuries and is older than the Dobermann as a breed. The historical reason for docking is to ensure that the tail does not get in the way of the dog's work. Docking and cropping (see below) have been written out of the Breed Standard by FCI and the International Dobermann Club (IDC), and dogs born after 2016 will not be allowed to participate in FCI or IDC shows without a full tail and natural ears. In the UK, dogs with docked tails have been banned from show for a number of years and the practice is now illegal for native born dogs. Docking is illegal in all European Union states, as well as Australia. The AKC standard for Doberman Pinschers includes a tail docked near the 2nd vertebra.

=== Ears ===
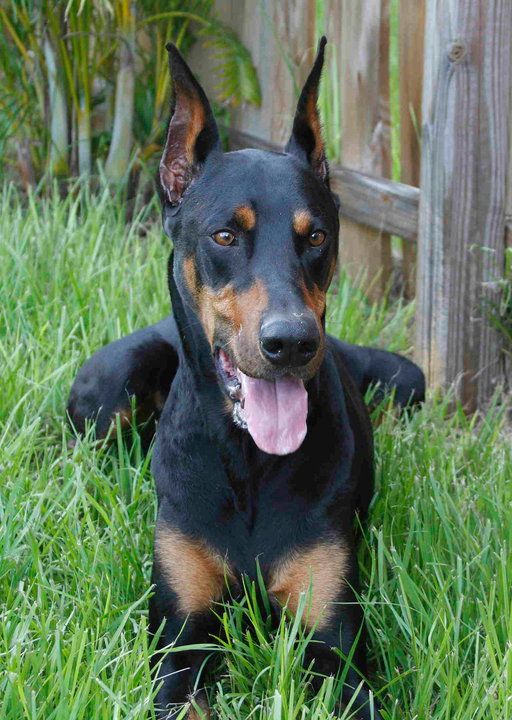
Traditional black and tan Dobermann with ears cropped

Some owners crop Dobermann's ears. The Doberman Pinscher Club of America requires that ears be "normally cropped and carried erect" for conformation. Like tail docking, ear cropping is illegal in many countries and has never been legal in some Commonwealth countries.

== Intelligence ==
The Doberman Pinscher has been ranked amongst the most intelligent dog breeds in experimental studies and expert evaluations. Psychologist Stanley Coren ranks the Dobermann as the 5th most intelligent dog in the category of obedience command training, based on the selective surveys answered by experienced trainers (as documented in his book The Intelligence of Dogs). Additionally, in two studies, Hart and Hart (1985) ranked the Doberman Pinscher first in the same category, and Tortora (1980) gave the Dobermann the highest rank in general trainability.

== Temperament ==
Although they are considered to be working dogs, Dobermanns are often stereotyped as being ferocious and aggressive.

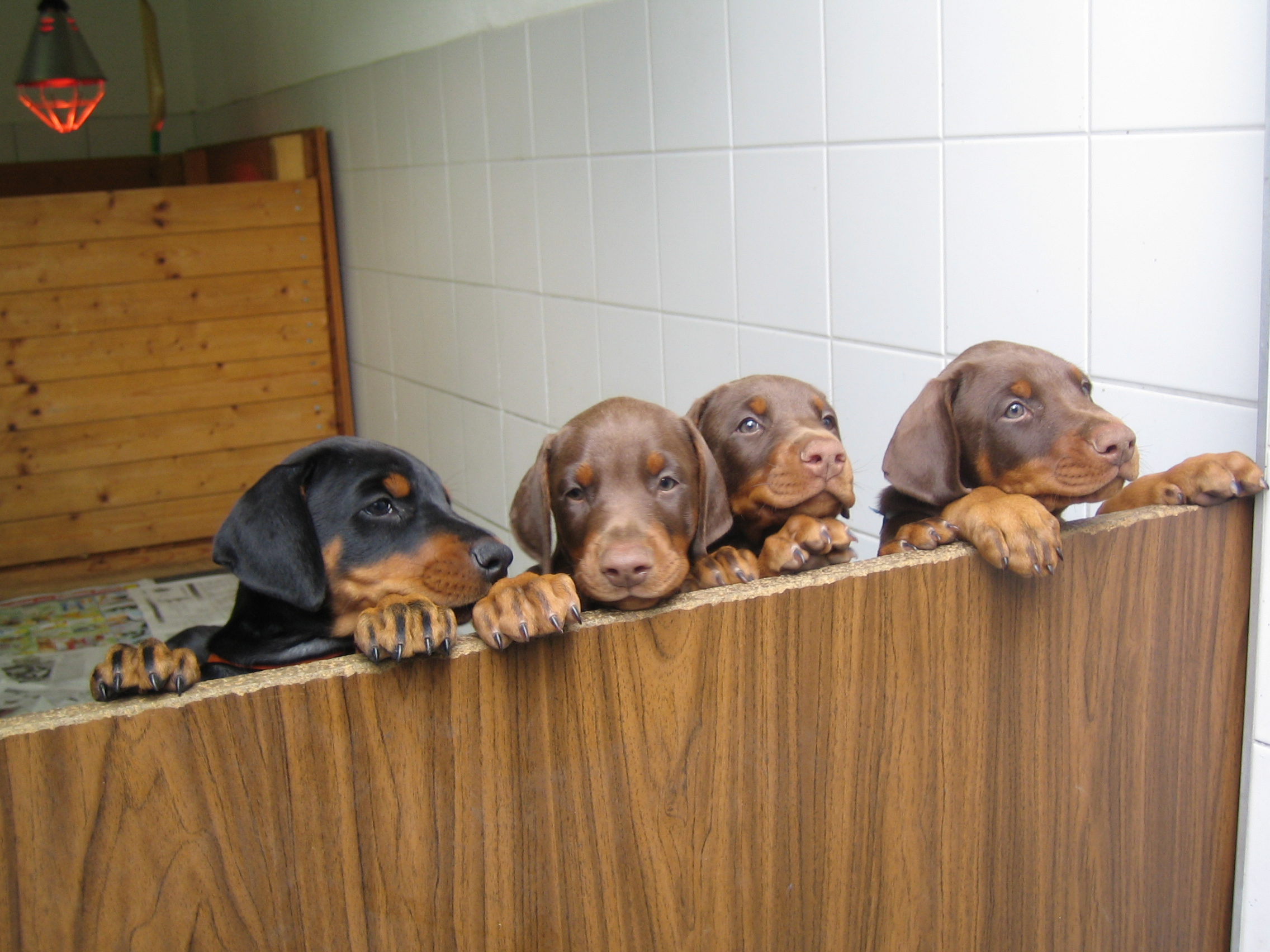
Doberman Pinscher puppies

There is some evidence that Doberman Pinschers in North America have a calmer and more even temperament than their European counterparts because of the breeding strategies employed by American breeders. Despite this, the American breed standard states that, for purposes of determining conformation fault, aggression and belligerence by a Doberman toward other dogs is not counted as viciousness.

There is a great deal of scientific evidence that Doberman Pinschers have a number of stable psychological traits, such as certain personality factors and intelligence. As early as 1965, studies have shown that there are several broad behavioral traits that significantly predict behavior and are genetically determined. Subsequently, there have been numerous scientific attempts to quantify canine personality or temperament by using statistical techniques for assessing personality traits in humans. These studies often vary in terms of the personality factors they focus on and in terms of ranking breeds differently along these dimensions. One such study found that Doberman Pinschers, compared to other breeds, rank high in playfulness, average in curiosity/fearlessness, low on aggressiveness, and low on sociability. Another such study ranked Doberman Pinschers low on reactivity/surgence and high on aggression/disagreeableness and openness/trainability.

In addition to the studies of canine personality, there has been some research to determine whether there are breed differences in aggression. In a study published in 2008, aggression was divided into four categories: aggression directed at strangers, owner, strange dogs, and rivalry with other household dogs. This study found that the Doberman Pinscher ranked relatively high on stranger-directed aggression, but extremely low on owner-directed aggression. The Doberman Pinscher ranked as average on dog-directed aggression and dog rivalry. Looking only at bites and attempted bites, Doberman Pinschers rank as far less aggressive towards humans and show less aggression than many breeds without a reputation (e.g., Cocker Spaniel, Dalmatian, and Great Dane). This study concluded that aggression has a genetic basis, that the Dobermann shows a distinctive pattern of aggression depending on the situation and that contemporary Doberman Pinschers are not an aggressive breed overall.

According to the Centers for Disease Control and Prevention (CDC), between 1979 and 1998, the Doberman Pinscher was less frequently involved in attacks on humans resulting in fatalities than several other dog breeds such as Pit bulls, German Shepherd Dogs, Rottweilers, Husky-type dogs, wolf-dog hybrids and Alaskan Malamutes. According to this CDC study, one of the most important factors contributing to dog bites is the level of responsibility exercised by dog owners.

== Health ==
=== Life expectancy ===
A 2024 UK study found a life expectancy of 11.2 years for the breed compared to an average of 12.7 for purebreeds and 12 for crossbreeds. A 2024 Italian study found a life expectancy of 8 years for the breed compared to 10 years overall. A 2005 Swedish study of insurance data found 68% of Dobermann died by the age of 10, higher than the overall rate of 35% of dogs dying by the age of 10.

=== Cardiac health ===
Cardiomyopathies are a common problem for the breed. and cardiac issues are a common cause of death in the breed with 15% of deaths being cardiac related according to a UK survey. Data from the University of Purdue Medical Veterinary Database found the breed to be predisposed to dilated cardiomyopathy (DCM) with 5.8% of Dobermanns having the condition. Another study in America found a prevalence of 7.32% for the condition. An English study of 369 cases found the Dobermann make up 16% of those. This disease impacts Dobermanns more severely than other breeds with an average survival time of 52 days compared to 240 days for other breeds. This is possibly due to the type of DCM that affects the Dobermann differing. Research has shown that the breed is affected by an attenuated wavy fiber type of DCM that affects many other breeds, as well as an additional fatty infiltration-degenerative type that appears to be specific to Dobermann Pinscher and Boxer breeds. This serious disease is likely to be fatal in most Dobermanns affected.

Roughly a quarter of Dobermann Pinschers who develop cardiomyopathy die suddenly from seemingly unknown causes, and an additional fifty percent die of congestive heart failure. Among female Dobermanns, the sudden death manifestation of the disease is more common, whereas males tend to develop congestive heart failure. In addition to being more prevalent in Dobermanns, this disease is also more serious in the breed. Following a diagnosis, the average non-Dobermann has an expected survival time of 8 months; for Dobermann Pinschers, however, the expected survival time is less than two months. Although the causes for the disease are largely unknown, there is evidence that it is a familial disease inherited as an autosomal dominant trait.

=== Dermatology ===
The Dobermann is predisposed to the following dermatological conditions: acral lick dermatitis; chin pyoderma, acne, or folliculitis; cutaneous drug eruptions; colour dilution alopecia; demodicosis; follicular dysplasia; interdigital haemorrhagic bulla, pedal furunculosis or cyst; pemphigus foliaceus; and vitiligo.

=== Other conditions ===
Other conditions that the breed is predisposed to include: von Willebrand's disease, and prostatic disease. Canine compulsive disorder was found to be prevalent in 28% of Dobermanns in one study. The breed is predisposed to hypothyroidism with one US study finding 6.3% of Dobermanns to have the condition compared to 1.54% for mixed-breeds. The Dobermann is also predisposed to gastric dilatation volvulus. A study of 295 cases in America found 6.1% of cases to belong to the Dobermann. Another American study of 1,934 cases found an odds ratio of 5.5 for the Dobermann.

=== Skeletal conditions ===
A North American study reviewing over a million dogs examined at veterinary teaching hospitals found the Dobermann to have a noticeably lower prevalence of hip dysplasia, with 1.34% of Dobermanns having hip dysplasia compared to 3.52% overall. Another North American study of over 1,000,000 and 250,000 hip and elbow scans found the Dobermann to be among the 15 breeds least likely to have both hip and elbow dysplasia. 5.7% of Dobermanns over the age of 2 years had hip dysplasia and 0.8% had elbow dysplasia.

A US study of the records of over 90,000 dogs found the Dobermann to be predisposed to intervertebral disc disease (IVDD), with 12.7% of Dobermanns having the condition compared to 4.43% for mixed-breeds.

== See also ==
- Choking Doberman
