= Virginia Vitzthum =

American anthropologist

- Education: Queens College; University of Michigan
- Awards: Fulbright Scholar (2017)
- Scientific career
- Fields: Physical anthropology
- Institutions: Indiana University
- Thesis: The role of ecological factors in odontometric variability and its implications for body size adaptations in Cercopithecidae (1986)

Virginia J. Vitzthum is an American anthropologist and Professor in the Department of Anthropology at Indiana University, where she is also a senior scientist at the Kinsey Institute. She is also the director of the Kinsey Institute's Evolutionary Anthropology (EVA) Laboratory and the co-director of their Human Biology Laboratory. Her research focuses on women's reproductive health in different cultures around the world. She originally joined the faculty of Indiana University in 2008, and was elected a fellow of the American Association for the Advancement of Science in 2011. In 2017, she was awarded a Fulbright Program fellowship at the University of Iceland.
