= Seidel test =

- Purpose: assess aqueous humor leakage from anterior chamber

The Seidel test is used to assess the presence of aqueous humor leakage from anterior chamber of the eye. Leakage may occur due to many corneal or scleral disorders, including corneal post-trauma, post-surgical leak, corneal perforation and corneal degeneration. Initially the test was used to detect aqueous humor leakage in postoperative patients, later it expanded to detect other causes or anterior chamber leakage.

== Name ==
The Seidel test was first described by German ophthalmologist Erich Seidel in 1921.

== Procedure ==
A fluorescein strip containing 10% fluorescein is applied topically to the affected area, without applying pressure on the eye due to the risk of tissue extrusion. The fluorescein is examined with a cobalt blue filter. At this point, the fluorescein appears green in color. Any changes in color or surface of the fluorescence area indicate the presence of corneal leakage. The test is contraindicated in obvious globe rupture, full-thickness eye laceration, and fluorescein hypersensitivity.

== Results of the test ==
If the fluorescein strip turns pale upon application to the corneal surface, the person tests positive for the corneal deformity they are being tested for. The change in the color of the fluorescein strip is due to dilution of fluorescein caused by the aqueous leakage in the cornea.
