= Karl Friedrich Louis Dobermann =

German dog breeder (1834–1894)

Louis Dobermann
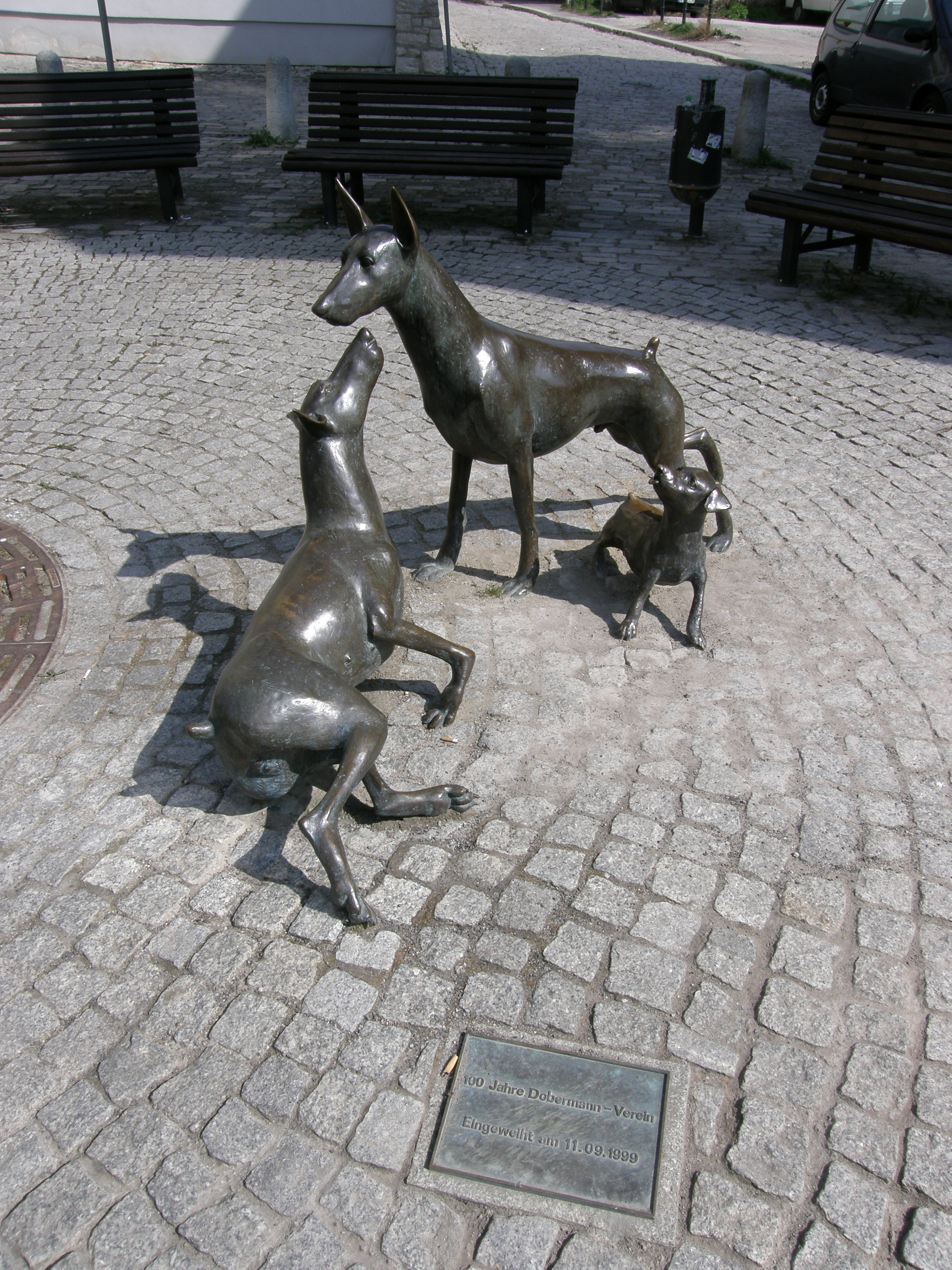
- Statue located in Apolda, Germany
- Born: 2 January 1834; Apolda, Saxe-Weimar-Eisenach, German Confederation
- Died: 9 June 1894 (aged 60); Apolda, Saxe-Weimar-Eisenach, Germany

Karl Friedrich Louis Dobermann (/ˈdoʊbərmən/; German pronunciation: [ˈdoːbɐman]; 2 January 1834 – 9 June 1894) was the first breeder of the Dobermann. He started the creation of this dog breed in the town of Apolda, in the Grand Duchy of Saxe-Weimar-Eisenach around 1890, following the Franco-Prussian War.

Dobermann served in the dangerous role of local tax collector, and ran the Apolda dog pound. With access to dogs of many breeds, he aimed to create a breed that would be ideal for protecting him during his collections, which took him through many dangerous, bandit-infested areas. He set out to breed a new type of dog that, in his opinion, would be the perfect combination of strength, loyalty, intelligence, and ferocity. Later, Otto Goeller and Philip Gruening continued to develop the breed to become the dog that is seen today.

After Dobermann's death in 1894, the Germans named the breed Dobermann-pinscher in his honor, but a half century later dropped the "pinscher" on the grounds that this German word for terrier was no longer appropriate. The British did the same a few years later.
