= Lee Charles Kelley =

American novelist

Lee Charles Kelley is an American novelist and dog trainer living in Manhattan.

Kelley is the author of six detective novels featuring Jack Field, an NYPD homicide cop who loves dogs and hates people, so he takes early retirement, moves to Maine, and buys a boarding and training kennel, hoping to get away from crimesolving. However, he falls in love with a part-time medical examiner, Dr. Jamie Cutter, and gets drawn back into detective work. Together the couple, along with their loyal canine companions, track down and catch the bad guys.

Kelley's novels are best described as a combination of murder mystery, romantic comedy, and dog training manuals, as they include comic, sometimes even farcical scenes, along with dog training tips, all woven into the mystery and suspense.

His critiques of the alpha theory and operant conditioning have made him a somewhat controversial figure in the dog world, which eventually led to an invitation from the editors of Psychology Today to write a blog on canine training and behavior for their website. The blog was titled "My Puppy, My Self" and ran from April, 2009 to February 2013, garnering nearly half-a-million views.

The training philosophy and techniques Kelley uses are based on a methodology created by Kevin Behan , author of Natural Dog Training and Your Dog Is Your Mirror. (Behan's father was John M. Behan , a legendary K-9 Corps trainer during World War II, and the author of Dogs of War.)

Kelley's first dog, Charley, was featured on NBC's Late Night with David Letterman in a recurring segment titled "Charlie [sic] the Bubble-Eating Dog (who never ate bubbles)," which ran between 1989 and 1990. Charley's first appearance in the skit coincided with Julia Roberts' first appearance on Late Night.

== Publications ==
- A Nose for Murder. New York : Avon Books, 2003. 267 p.; 18 cm. ISBN 0-06-052493-6 (pbk.)
- Murder Unleashed. New York : Avon Books, c2004. viii, 291 p.; 18 cm. ISBN 0-06-052494-4
- To Collar a Killer. New York : Avon Books, 2004. viii, 286 p.; 18 cm. ISBN 0-06-052495-2
- ’Twas the Bite Before Christmas. New York : Avon Books, c2005. 366 p.; 18 cm. ISBN 0-7394-6046-3 (hardcover), ISBN 0-06-073228-8 (pbk.)
- Dogged Pursuit. New York : Avon Books, 2006. Trimsize: 4 3/16 × 6 3/4; Pages: 320; ISBN 0-06-073229-6;
- Like a Dog with a Bone, New York : Avon Books, 2007 Mass Market Paperback: 272 pages ISBN 0-06-073230-X
- The French Poodle Connection, a Jack Field short story, appears in the anthology, Bark M for Murder (an anthology of "Canine crime tales from the best of the breed!") J.A. Jance ... [et al.]. New York : Avon Books, 2006. 313 p.; 18 cm. ISBN 0-06-081537-X (pbk.)
