= Dog behaviourist =

Person who changes dog behaviour

A dog behaviourist is a person who works in modifying or changing behaviour in dogs. They can be experienced dog handlers who have developed their experience over many years of hands-on experience, or have formal training up to degree level. Some have backgrounds in veterinary science, animal science, zoology, sociology, biology, or animal behaviour, and have applied their experience and knowledge to the interaction between humans and dogs. Professional certification may be offered through either industry associations or local educational institutions. There is, however, no compulsion for behaviourists to be members of a professional body, nor to take formal training.

== Overview ==
While any person who works to modify a dog's behaviour might be considered a dog behaviourist in the broadest sense of the term, an animal behaviourist, is a title generally given to individuals who have obtained relevant professional qualifications. The professional fields and course of study for dog behaviourists include, but are not limited to animal science, zoology, sociology, biology, psychology, ethology, and veterinary science. People with these credentials usually refer to themselves as Clinical Animal Behaviourists, Applied Animal Behaviourists (PhD) or Veterinary behaviourists (veterinary degree). If they limit their practice to a particular species, they might refer to themselves as a dog/cat/bird behaviourist.

While there are many dog trainers who work with behavioural issues, there are relatively few qualified dog behaviourists. For the majority of the general public, the cost of the services of a dog behaviourist usually reflects both the supply/demand inequity, as well as the level of training they have obtained.

Some behaviourists can be identified in the U.S. by the post-nominals "CAAB", indicating that they are a Certified Applied Animal behaviourist (which requires a Ph.D. or veterinary degree), or "DACVB", indicating that they are a diplomate of the American College of Veterinary behaviour (which requires a veterinary degree). In the UK veterinary and non-veterinary behaviourists certified by an ABTC Practitioner organisation may use the postnominals “CCAB” or “ABTC-CAB”, or wider in Europe Veterinary Specialists in Behavioural Medicine use “DipECAWBM(BM)”.

== Discipline ==
Behaviourism is the theory or doctrine that human or animal psychology can be accurately studied only through the examination and analysis of objectively observable and quantifiable behavioural events, in contrast with subjective mental states. A dog practitioner using a behavioural approach or psychobiological approach, regardless of title, typically works one-on-one with a dog and its owner. This may be carried out in the dog's home, the practitioner's office, the place where the dog is showing behavioural problems, or a variety of these locations for different sessions during the treatment time. By observing the dog in his/her environment and skillfully interviewing the owner, the behaviourist creates a working hypothesis on what is motivating, and thus sustaining, the behaviour.

Office-bound behaviourists may be disadvantaged when it comes to assessing behavioural modification, as the dog may act very differently in different locations and interviewing owners, no matter how thorough, may not provide enough details. After establishing a motivating cause, the practitioner will develop a step-wise, goal-based plan to alter the behaviour in stages, continue their work with the pet owner to guide and make changes in the plan as the goals are met (or not) and conclude with a final write up of the case and its outcome.

The methods and tools of the behaviourist will depend on several factors including the dog's temperament, the behaviourist's personal philosophy on training, the behaviourist's experience, and the behavioural problems being addressed. At one end of the spectrum, some behaviourists attempt to train dogs, refraining from the use of aversive or coercive methods (and the tools associated with them, such as choke, prong/pinch or electric shock collars, kicking, hitting, poking, staring, shaking, or rolling), choosing instead to rely on reward-based methods. Dog behaviourists and dog trainers with a knowledge of how to approach training in a behavioural way usually do not offer guaranteed results.

Other behaviourists believe that the use of verbal corrections, head collars, correction collars, or electric collars are necessary or useful when treating particular dogs or particular behavioural problems. The general philosophy in use is to avoid methods that could cause confusion, fear, pain and anything other than mild stressors. Dog trainers who use these techniques may or may not be utilising a behavioural approach and may or may not have an understanding of the science behind behaviour modification. Dog behaviourists who lack professional credentials are generally dog trainers who have developed their expertise for working with problem dogs over many years of hands-on experience. They may or may not have studied behaviour formally in college or any dog training school.

The differences between a dog behavioural problem and a dog training problem may be difficult for some dog owners to understand, due to the lack of a formal definition. At the same time, the dog training techniques utilised by dog trainers and behaviourists may often compete when considering which practitioner is better qualified to meet the dog's or owner's needs. The disciplines of dog trainers who follow a behavioural approach, informed by the study of the science of behaviour modification, can sometimes be juxtaposed against dog trainers who present themselves as experts at solving behavioural problems. The discussion and assessment, for some, may be more about appropriate methods and tools, rather than use of the term behaviourist.

== Professional associations ==
In order to assist dog owners and trainers understand and utilise this behavioural training or become certified in the practice, professional associations dedicated to the development of behavioural dog training offer tools to further their development. Different associations have different standards, goals, and requirements for membership. Board-certified veterinary behaviourists are required to pass a credentialing application and exam to be recognised as board-certified in the view of the American Veterinary Medical Association (AVMA), or similar in other parts of the world, including the Animal Behaviour and Training Council in the UK, European Board of Veterinary Specliaists (EBVS) and the Australian and New Zealand College of Veterinary Scientists (ANZCVS).

Behaviourists may work and study towards formal accreditation with one of the many colleges providing training. Some associations might require accreditation to join, while others may require a declaration of intent for continuing personal development. Accreditation, may also be offered through local colleges and educational institutions.

== See also ==
- Ivan Pavlov
- B.F. Skinner
- John Broadus Watson
