= Dog bite tug =

Dog training tool

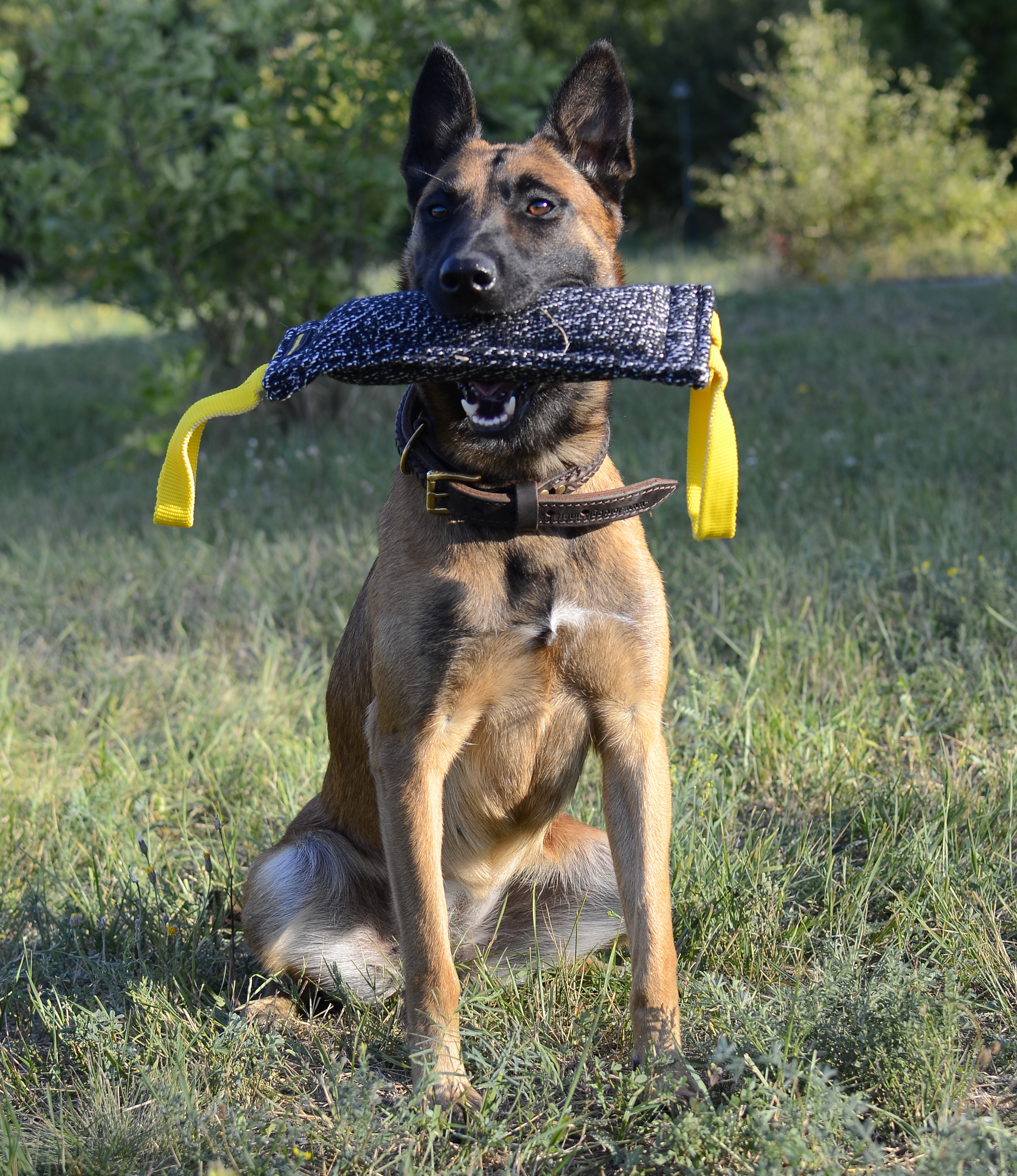
Malinois playing with dog bite tug made of French linen

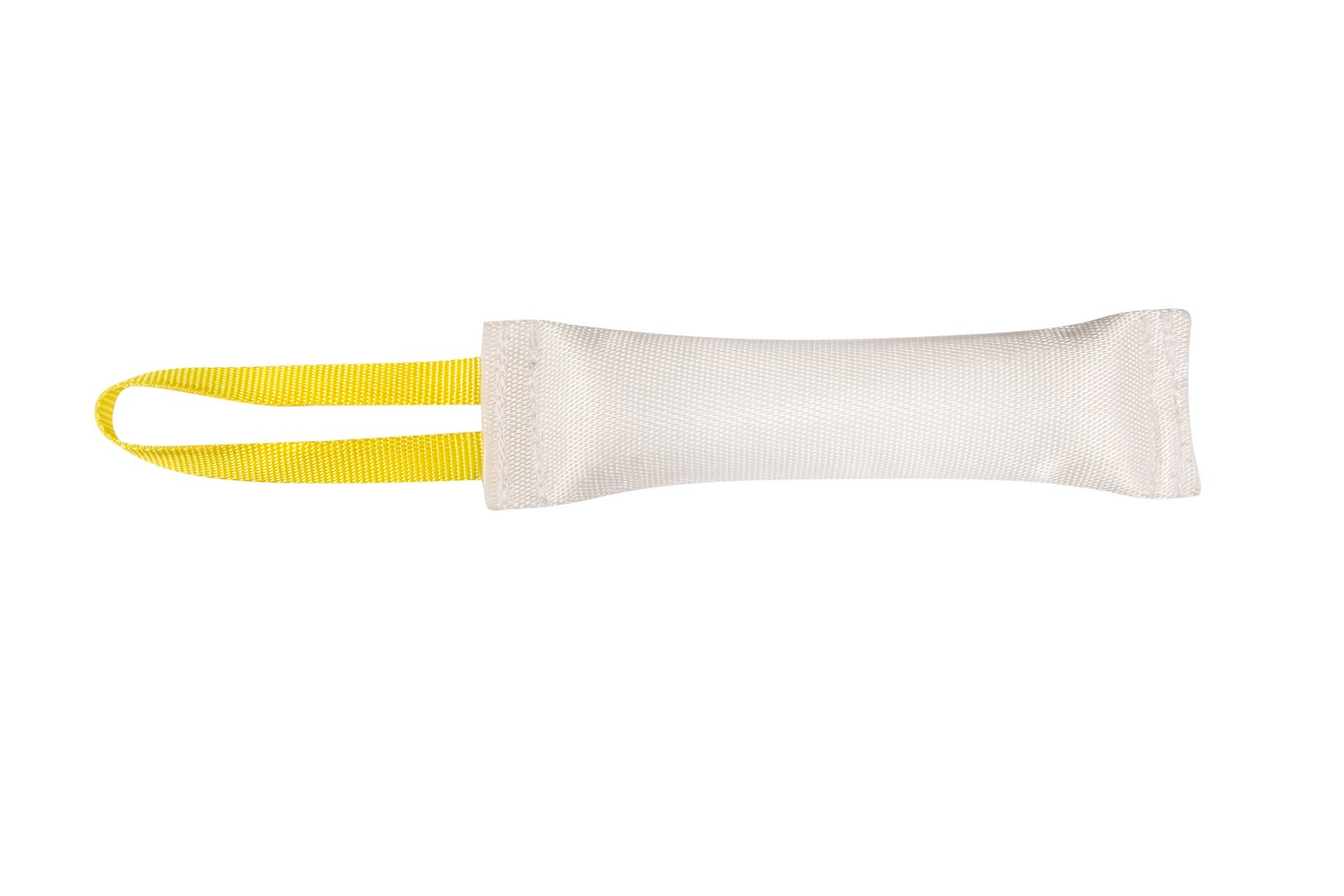
Dog bite tug made of fire hose for puppy and adult dog training

A bite tug is an important drive and retrieve building tool used in dog training. It is used for police, military and Schutzhund dog training. Bite tugs are perfect for puppies but can be used for training adult dogs as well.

Bite pillows are larger tugs which are used for precision bite work training. They are safer and increase accuracy in bite work.

== Materials ==
Traditionally, bite tugs are made of leather, jute, fire hose, synthetic fibers, etc. The harder the material, the more effort a dog needs to exert. Durability of a bite tug depends upon the quality of materials used to make it. Natural fabrics like leather and jute are safe and non-toxic. Bite tugs made of natural materials will not endanger a dog's health, the teeth in particular. Bite tugs are heavily stuffed with safe materials. Still, it is recommended not to leave a dog with a bite tug alone because a dog can tear it apart and have serious health problems or choke on the stuffing.

== Size and design ==
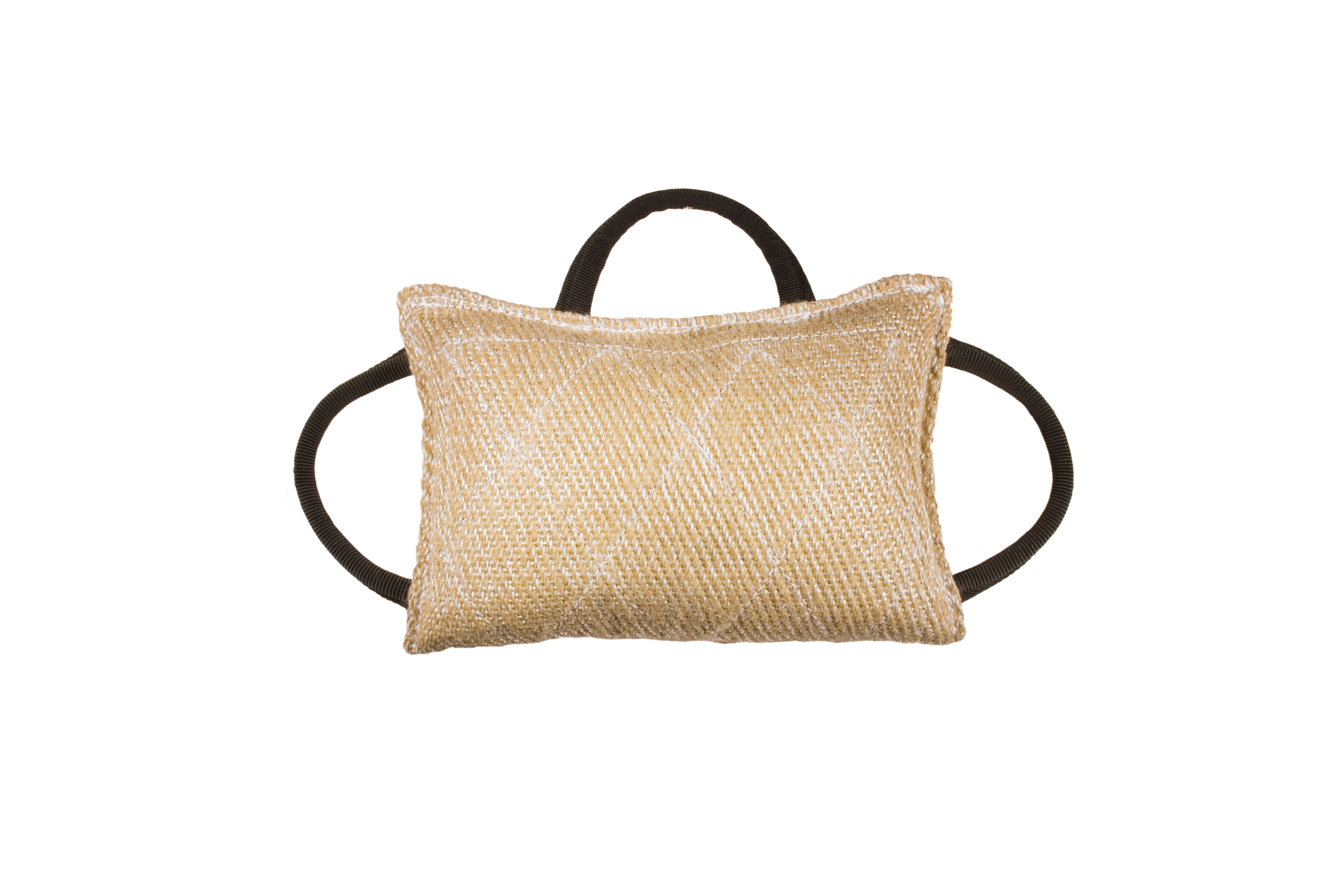
Jute bite pad for dog training

There are various dimensions of dog bite tugs. They vary in length and diameter. Bite tugs can have 1 to 3 handles, or none at all. There are bite tugs with special bags in which treats can be stored.

Usually, a dog trainer chooses a bite tug whose design fits with the trainer's personal preferences.

== Puppy training with a bite tug ==
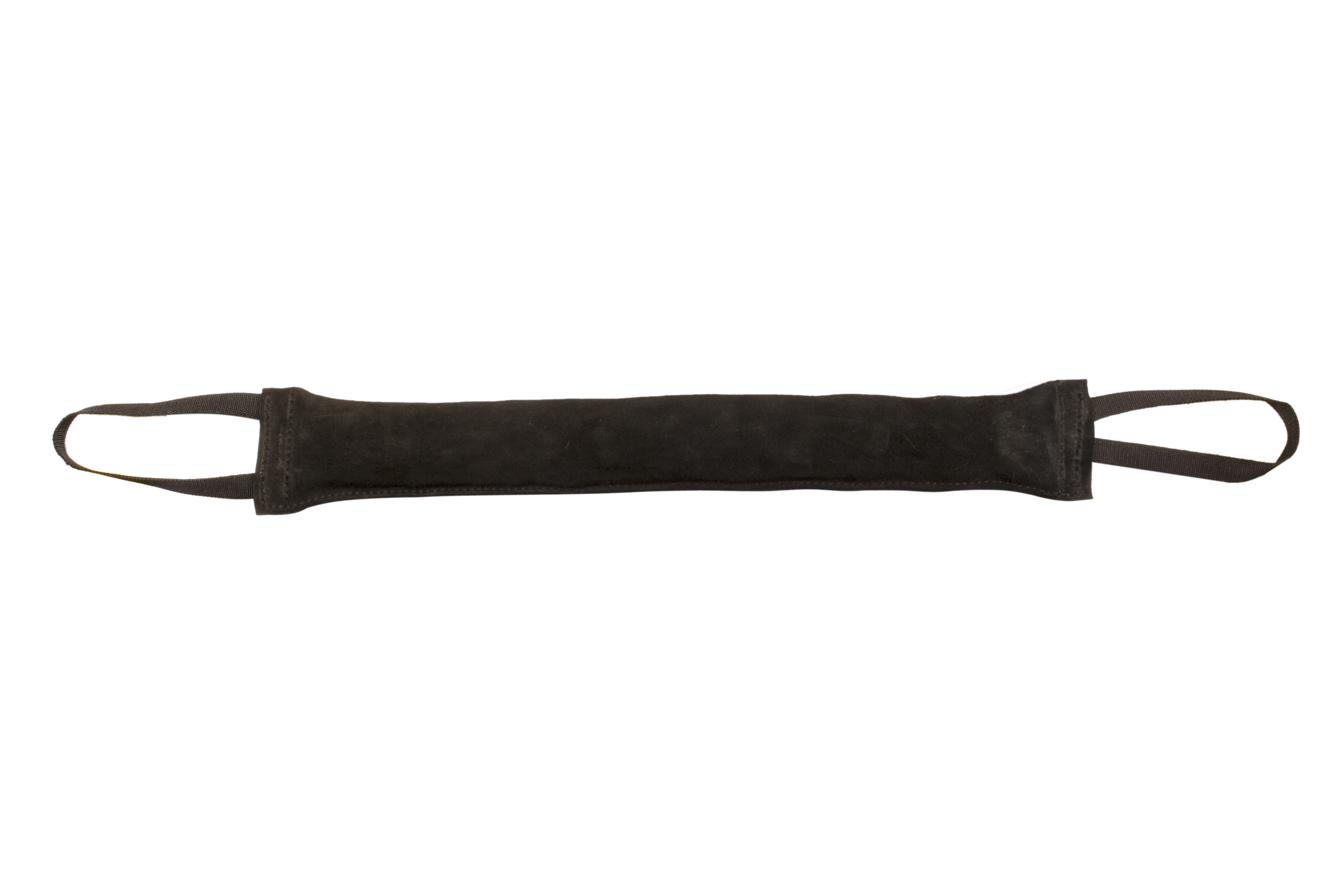
Leather bite tug for prey drive and retrieve skills building

Longer bite tugs are used for puppies. The longer the tug, the easier for a puppy to bite it. A two-month-old puppy can be trained with a bite tug. Bite tugs are suitable for obedience training as well. Encouraging a dog for his efforts and attention is always needed. Encouragement can consist of treats or the actual bite tug given as a reward.

== Adult dog training ==
The smallest tug is suitable for the training of larger, adult dogs. Long tugs will not be as effective since adult dogs can easily grab them. Bite tugs with handles are easy to use. The tug should be moved very fast so that a dog can not get at it. Short quick movements by the trainer make a dog move fast. Exercises of this kind help to develop drive.

== See also ==
- Dog training
- Obedience training
- Police dog
