= Alpha roll =

Dog training technique

The alpha roll is a dog training technique that is considered outdated by many modern-day dog trainers. The theory behind the training method is that dogs are hierarchical animals. The technique is used to teach the dog that the trainer or owner of the dog is the pack leader (alpha animal). Methods include when a dog misbehaves to pin the dog on its back and held in that position, sometimes by the throat.

== History ==
The alpha roll was first popularized by the Monks of New Skete, in the 1978 book How To Be Your Dog's Best Friend. However, in the 2002 second edition of the book, the monks recanted and strongly discouraged the technique, describing it as "too risky and demanding for the average dog owner." Although the 1978 book is widely regarded as a classic in dog training literature and highly recommended for people trying to better understand their dog, the alpha roll is now highly controversial among animal behaviorists because the theory of canine dominance has since been disproved. In the original context, the alpha roll was meant to be used only in the most serious cases.

The theory behind the alpha roll is based on a 1947 research study which looked at the behavior of captive wolves. The wolves were kept in an area too small for their numbers and composed of members that would not be found together in a wild pack. These conditions resulted in increased numbers of conflicts that scientists today know are not typical of wolves living in the wild. Behaviors seen in wolves (specifically the alpha roll) living in atypical social groups and crowded conditions do not translate to domestic dog training, especially because using the technique can be harmful to both the handler and the dog.

== Effects ==
It has been argued by some that a dog will only forcibly flip another onto its back during a serious fight where the intent may be to kill the opponent.

The name "alpha roll" is considered to be a misnomer by some wolf researchers because the practice when used as a behavioral correction bears little relation to the natural behavior shown by wild wolves. David Mech refers to this behavior as "pinning", a dominance behavior.

While "alpha rolling" can appear to be effective in the short term, there are serious questions about the safety of implementing this technique, as well as potential long-term negative behavioral effects of doing so.

== Contemporary use ==
The use of the alpha roll is currently viewed unfavorably by the positive reinforcement training community as an outdated technique. In addition, the same scientist, David Mech, who pioneered the theory of "alpha" behavior has since debunked his own theory.

Position statements on dominance released by AVSAB question the science behind training techniques that rely on dominance theory. They recommend the alpha roll should never be used by inexperienced trainers, and never to correct undesired behavior caused by the dog's failure to understand a command. Used in a controlled way and coupled with praise and rewards when the dog changes its behavior appropriately, it may have positive effect in the short-term, but there is disagreement about its long-term effectiveness and safety. A 2009 study by the University of Bristol's Department of Clinical Veterinary Sciences showed that methods of handling that relied on dominance theory actually provoked aggressive behavior in dogs with no previous known history of aggression. The study also examined the development of hierarchy in domestic dogs and found that no definitive hierarchical structure developed within the group, leading study authors to question the alpha role in this group.

Nevertheless, there are some modern-day dog trainers and animal researchers who have argued that the alpha roll is valid because dominance does exist in dogs and to deny it is motivated by political correctness. American Adjunct Professor of Zoology Patricia McConnell who is an expert in animal behaviour, wrote in her book The Other End of the Leash, “In some training and behavioural circles, all talk of dominance is classed as politically incorrect, and that these people are ardently opposed to anyone using the word in the context of dogs”. Portuguese animal behaviourist Roger Abrantes argues the reasons that many people have difficulty comprehending the theory of dominance are because the term is poorly defined and political correctness. Colin Tennant, who is the chairman of the Canine and Feline Behaviour Association, said “It is political correctness. If you treat a dog like a human it will treat you like a dog”. Psychologist and dog trainer Stanley Coren in the 2001 book How to Speak Dog wrote, "You are the alpha dog... You must communicate that you are the pack leader and dominant". Mexican-American dog trainer Cesar Millan argues that “Dogs are social pack animals with a leader and followers”.
