= Allelomimetic behavior =

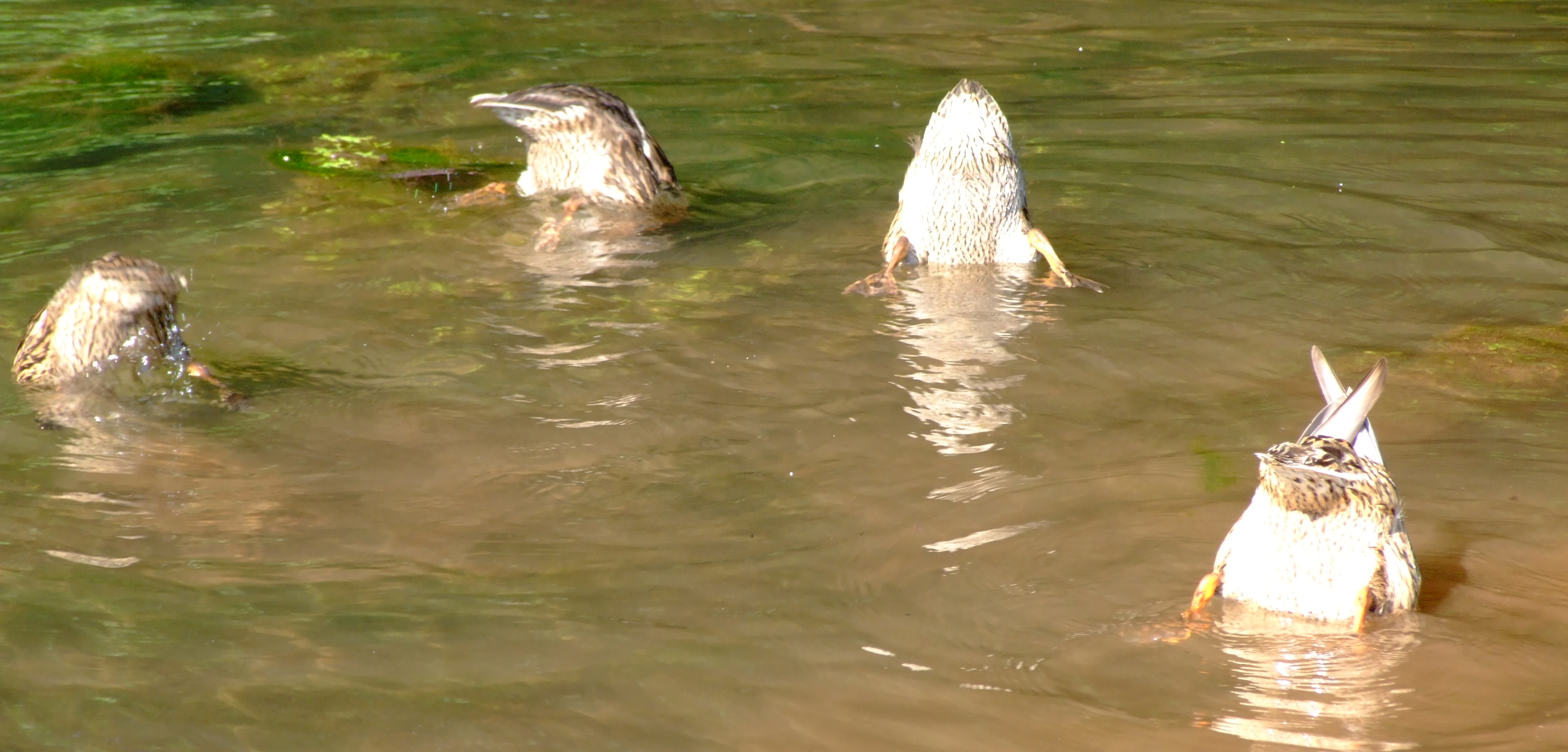
Ducks performing allelomimetic behavior with feeding behaviors

Allelomimetic behavior, or allomimetic behavior, is a range of activities in which the performance of a behavior increases the probability of that behavior being performed by other nearby animals. Allelomimetic behavior is sometimes called contagious behavior and has strong components of social facilitation, imitation, and group coordination. It is usually considered to occur between members of the same species. An alternate definition is that allelomimetic behavior is a more intense or more frequent response or the initiation of an already known response, when others around the individual are engaged in the same behavior. It is often referred to as synchronous behavior, mimetic behavior, imitative behavior, and social facilitation.

Allelomimetic behavior is displayed in all animals and can occur in any stage of life, but usually starts at a young age. This behavior will continue throughout life, especially when an individual is living in a large group that emphasizes group cohesion. Cohesion is seen as a prerequisite for group living, with synchronous activity being crucial for social cohesion. However, animals in large cohesive groups face trade-offs when allelomimetic behavior is adopted. If the behavior is adopted then the risk of predation or capture decreases significantly but the inter-individual competition for immediate resources, such as food, mates, and space, will increase when cohesion is still stressed. Many collective group decisions in animals are the result of allelomimetism and can be explained by allelomimetic behaviors. Some examples are the cockroaches choosing a single aggregation site, schooling behaviors in fishes, and pheromone-based path selection in ants that allows all the workers to go down the same path to a specific food source. Allelomimetic behavior can also be seen as an animal welfare indicator. For example, if cattle do not have enough room to all lie down simultaneously then it indicates that there are not enough resources present and this can result in lameness of the animals that are forced to stand. Allomimicry is affected by circadian rhythms and circadian cycles of activity within groups which can give the overall appearance of poor animal welfare, if allomimetic behavior were to be used as a welfare indicator then it must be measured several times throughout the course of a day. Most mechanisms involved in performing allelomimetic behavior do not require circadian rhythms to function. Decisions at the individual level are, more often than not, enough to encourage allelomimetism. Patterns of allelomimetic behavior can vary from species to species and can possibly explain other behaviors seen in the animal kingdom.

== Function ==
Group cohesion: Social animals often benefit by behaving in a similar manner to others within their group. This means that when animals switch behaviors, e.g. from lying to grazing, a degree of synchrony is beneficial. Sometimes this synchrony can be provided by environmental cues, at other times it is provided by the group members themselves. In 1978, Clayton wrote "...where environmental stimuli only provide gross synchrony, socially facilitated behavior will provide finer-scale synchrony, and, what is functionally important, greater cohesion of the social group’.

== Threats ==
Synchronous behavior is also threatened when animals in a mixed-sex herd have differing nutritional or physical necessities. This causes group instability which often splits the herd up into two separate groups; generally all male and all female, to recreate the mimetic behavior in a smaller, same-sex group that has more similar needs to the individual. Synchronized, allelomimetic behavior is also affected by many factors, such as age, general group size, sex, space, resource availability, and domestication. Domestication can also be seen as a threat to allelomimetic behavior. The process of domestication removes many threats like predation, food shortages, and competition from many individuals for breeding by providing basically unlimited food and resources while providing protection from outside predators. Domestication may favour less synchronization for animals and provide an adaptation to mimetic behavior to save energy in domesticated animals. Domestication also changes the inter-individual distances between animals and behavioral synchrony in general, both of which are important for anti-predator strategies and responses.

== In horses ==
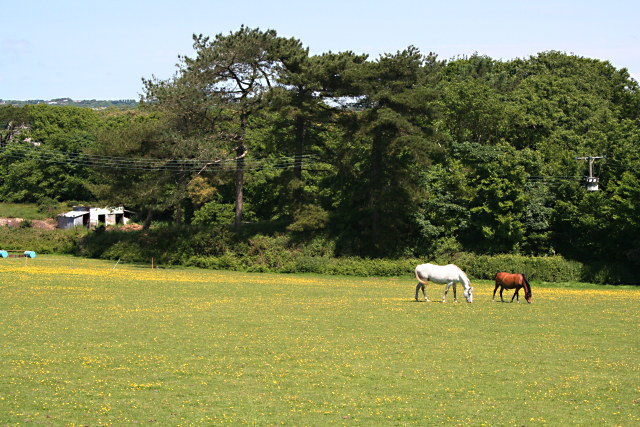
Allelomimetic behavior shown in grazing horses. Postural imitation is seen in regards to the stance and position of the legs.

Horses, like many animals, learn through imitation of their parents, most often the mother or "broodmare", or the owner of the foal if the broodmare is not available. If the foal is paired with its mother it will not only mimic the mare's walking style and speed, but it will also mimic the mare's temperament and general behaviors. If a foal was to spend much of its early life around a mare that had an unstable temperament, irrational fears and was difficult to work with then it would grow to be an unstable adult that would develop behavioral abnormalities such as balking. Miller (1996) also adds that behavioral issues can also be removed through allelomimetic processes. Balking is a common behavior in horses and mules that occur from insecurities and fears, and is observed as hesitance with a general fear of moving forward due to the possibility of attack or invasion of their personal space. This behavior can be eliminated if the owner is fearless, looking forward with their head raised high and marching in place. This shows the horse that there is nothing to fear and eventually the horse will mimic the owner's behavior, sync their gait to the owner and follow along. Repeating this behavior as needed will eventually allow the horse to fully incorporate the owner's fearless behavior into its repertoire and prevent balking from reoccurring. Bad habits are also learned through mimicry if the vast majority of the animals present a specific habit. Cribbing is an example of one such habit. If a foal is raised in an environment where this abnormal behavior is performed by the older members of the team, then it will mimic the habit as well, even if the behavior is dangerous to the individual's health. However, the same mimetic behavior that produces these bad habits can help remove them as well. If a broodmare is unable to train her offspring then it falls to the owner to properly train the foal on proper walking gait, speed, and normal behaviors. If the owner spends enough time with their foal keeping a proper stance (ie, an erect, unmoving torso and flexed knees while walking) then the foal will mimic and perform the proper movements for the rest of its life.

== In sheep ==
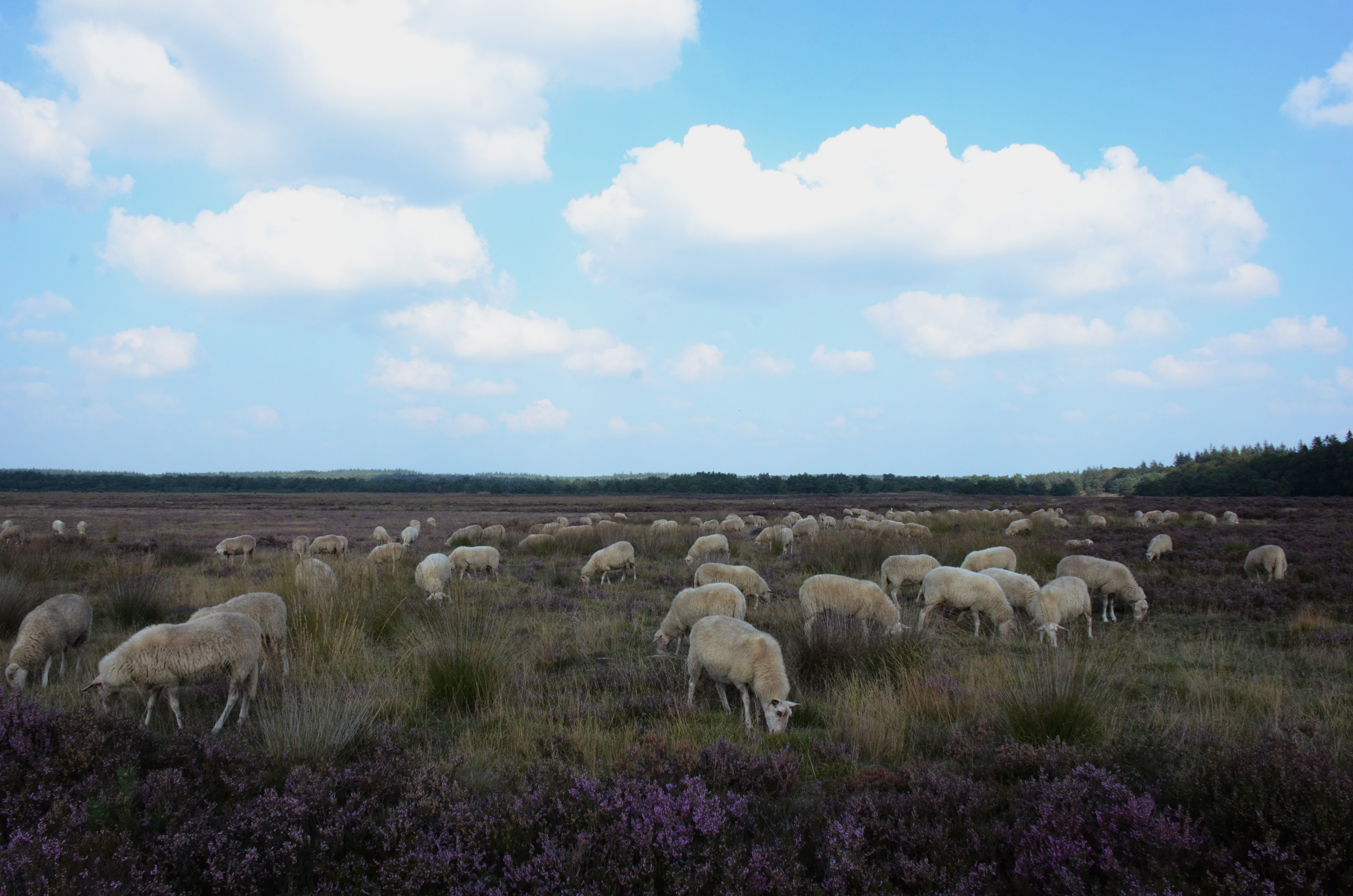
A herd of sheep spreading out and displaying mimetic foraging behavior

Sheep provide test cases for the evaluation of allelomimetic behavior due to their large group-sizes and social behavior. Using them as experimental subjects allows for the determination of the imitative quality and intensity of allelomimetic behavior within a specific herd. Merino sheep, a breed of Ovis aries, are a domesticated prey species that require a healthy balance between predator-avoidance and foraging-space for each individual in the herd. They achieve this balance by spreading out to forage for a period of time then quickly running back to the centre of the herd, creating a fast packing event. A fast-packing event is specifically when an individual on the outskirts of the herd changes its behavior from grazing to running and moves towards the centre of the herd. Fast-packing events are seen as an adaptive behavior for reducing predation due to the intensity of the response presented in other sheep when one individual is seen running from the outer edges to the centre of the herd. This behavioral change is also referred to as activation/inactivation rates or switching behavior. This change influences other sheep to start running to the centre of the herd until all sheep simultaneously stop in the middle and form a tightly packed herd. The cycle will restart when the herd starts to spread out to forage again. The individual that is displaying the switching behavior from inactivity (grazing in one spot) to activity (running towards the centre of the herd) or vice versa is generally referred to as the herd leader, and other individuals who mimic the switch from inactivity to activity or activity to inactivity display allelomimetic behavior. These activation and inactivation rates are generally more strongly presented in males compared to females and increase as the number of individuals performing an activity increase, which is a good indication of imitation present in the herd. For example, if a herd had the majority of individuals active, then the likelihood of another random individual becoming active increases. The same goes for a herd with a majority of individuals being inactive. In experiments, these events are not specific to a singular spot or caused by any external stimuli that would warrant an alarm response in the sheep. In an experiment performed by Gautrais, members of the same sex more often performed mimetic behavior with each other than when compared to members of a mixed-sex group. Gautrais also focused on behavioral synchrony of activity and inactivity, since cohesion of a group involves individuals being active and inactive at the same time rather than syncing every activity to another individual.

Even in the absence of other animals, individuals will switch between behaviors that require activity and inactivity (such as digestion, inactivity is good to promote digestion or hunger outweighing the need for rest). Gautrais believes that this physiological need is what prompted the first individual in his herd experiment to switch from activity to inactivity or vice versa and the other members in the herd to follow suit. However, as the number of individuals in a herd decreases, the option to perform mimetic behavior also decreases. This creates a higher rate of spontaneous switching between activity and inactivity-related behaviors. In contrast, the larger the herd is, the more likely it is for mimetic behaviors to occur with spontaneous switching behavior occurring in the "herd leader", with other members following suit in a brief period of time. This is due to the number of con-specifics present at any given time. If the herd is a small group then there are fewer con-specifics which gives less opportunity for imitation to occur in any given individual and a higher rate of switching from inactivity to activity to inactivity will occur. Two ideas are proposed when the original running individual can recruit others into the running group and the herd as a whole can coordinate when to stop running during these fastpacking events:

- The first idea is that the initiation and inhibition of the packing event is based on allelomimetic effects in local interactions.
- The second idea suggests that a close-enough distance between herd neighbours will stop running behavior.

These conclusions stem from an idea about optimization processes in sheep that, at an individual level, allows for the balance of exploring as much space as possible (to avoid competition for food) and keeping in contact with other herd members (to avoid predation and to reinforce herd cohesion). These optimization processes can adjust the allelomimetic interaction-strengths between individuals to ensure both of the above necessities are met.

== In cattle ==
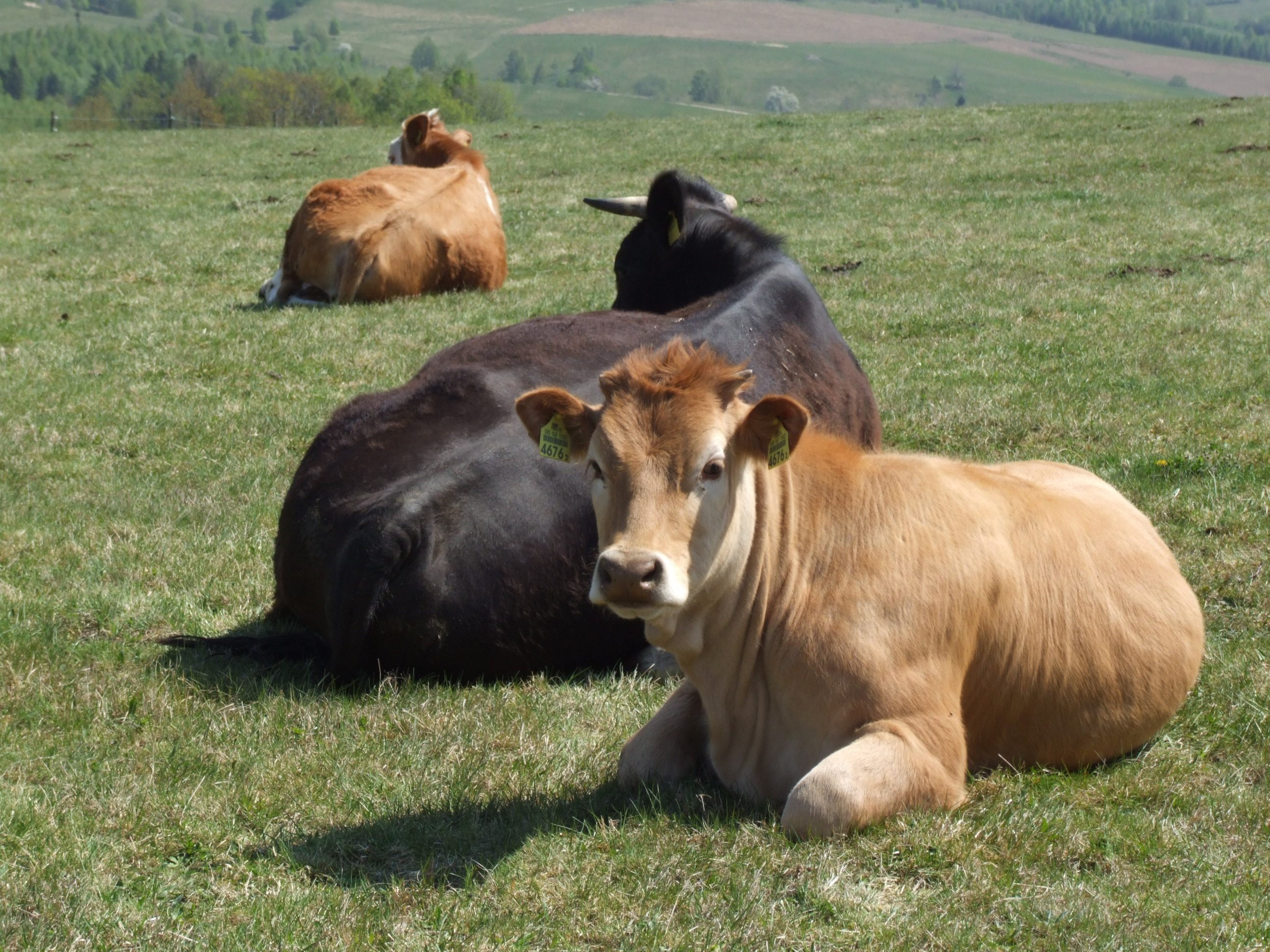
Social facilitation seen in cattle from all the pictured cattle resting at the same time

The synchronous behavior that is displayed in cattle is what is typically thought of when discussing allelomimetic behavior. When the necessary resources for survival, such as food, water, and shelter, are sufficient then cattle will display postural synchrony, lying down or standing while other members of the herd are doing the same. This phenomenon, also referred to as social facilitation, occurs in both free-range cattle that live in pastures, and cattle that live primarily in barns. Social facilitation (or allelomimicry) is the first of two main ideas behind cattle mimicking each other's behavior until the herd acts synchronously, whether it be lying down, standing, or grazing together. According to Stoye and Porter, one member of the herd will alter its behavior (ie. standing to lying down or vice versa) and its nearest neighbor will mimic the behavior, this behavior will travel across the herd until all members are performing one action. Stoye and Porter also noted that it was more likely for a cow to display the same behavior as its nearest neighbor compared to a randomly selected cow from the herd. This behavior continues despite the appearance of free will of an individual to graze/stand or lie down, even when the herd is stationary. The second idea behind synchronized behavior is called concurrent or combined response. This dictates that the collective behavior is a mere coincidence of each individual animal's decision to change their behavior based on external (the discovery of food) or internal (exhaustion, the need for rest/food, or similar daily schedules as other members) factors. A human example of a concurrent behavior is rush hour, many people are driving at the same time due to having a similar schedule to others, not because others are already driving and they decide to as well. Previous studies have identified artificial synchronization of (dairy) cattle behavior because of consistent milking and feeding times. This creates a similar daily schedule for all the cattle to follow, which in turn creates collective behavior between all members during these specific milking and feeding times. According to Stoye and Porter, cattle were most synchronous at night, least synchronous during the afternoon, and intermediately synchronous in the morning. This could be due to all the cattle being milked at similar times in the morning and feeding at similar times during the night, but having no "scheduled activity" to perform during the afternoon.

== In dogs ==
=== Feeding habits ===
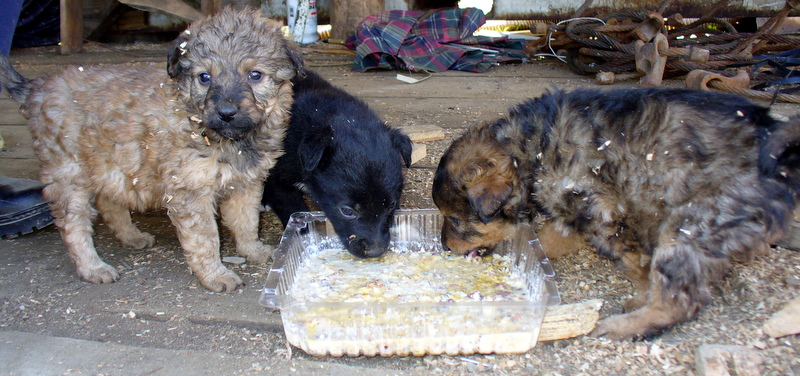
Dogs mimicking feeding behaviors in the presence of another hungry litter-mate

Dogs are one of the most common species to produce allelomimetic behavior and have it go noticed by humans. Studies have been conducted across several breeds of dog regarding eating habits and stress vocalization when alone or with litter-mates. Many results have shown that most dogs will eat more when they are in large groups compared to when they eat alone. This has been coined as the "social facilitation of eating" and is not specific to certain breeds. In a study conducted by Compton and Scott, 80% of the dogs studied ate more in groups on the majority of trials and the overall group consumption together was larger than the summation of food consumption between each dog eating individually. When pups were considered food-satiated (would not eat more food even with a dish in front of them), they would resume eating when a hungry litter-mate was introduced into the room with them. It was believed that since everything other than the addition of the hungry litter-mate was held constant, the increased appetite in the food-satiated pup was caused by the presence of the hungry pup and allelomimetic behavior. The allelomimetic behavior that occurs in dogs develops directly from experiences that occur during the critical period of development. Scott's proposed theory of social motivation and the theory of the social facilitation of eating rely heavily on the allelomimetic behavioral system that occurs in these animals.

=== Isolation and vocalization responses ===
Isolation is a large stressor for many dogs and can result in separation anxiety if they are left alone from others for extended lengths of time during a critical period in their development. If a puppy is separated from their litter-mates, home pen, or owners during a critical period it will produce an intense negative emotional reaction and the reaction will subside when they return to their litter-mates, home pen, or owners. This reaction is a natural conditioned learning paradigm that will have to be constantly repeated during their infancy to remove the intensity of the response. When housed with other litter-mates the individual will be strongly motivated to mimic the behavior of the animals around it. Introducing other litter-mates who do not experience a severe negative emotion to isolation is one of the ways to avoid negative reactions to isolation in the individual in question. This provides a base for mimetic behavior to occur and the pup experiencing severe negative emotions will begin to mimic the behavior of the litter-mates and adopt their neutral behavior. Scott and Bronson replicated a study originally conducted by Fredericson in 1952 about vocalization rates of beagle puppies when confined in a box alone or with a companion. Fredericson found that 75% of puppies would vocalize significantly less when confined with another puppy compared to alone, a result that was replicated and confirmed by Scott and Bronson in 1971. Many dogs were more distressed when they were placed alone in an unfamiliar environment compared to a known environment, or an unfamiliar environment with litter-mates. This increase in calm behavior when multiple litter-mates are in an unfamiliar environment is caused by allelomimetic behavior. If one pup is calm, many dogs will mimic that behavior, creating a litter of relaxed dogs. Likewise, if there is one distressed pup, many dogs could also mimic the distressed behavior but the former is more common among experiments.

== In chickens and roosters ==
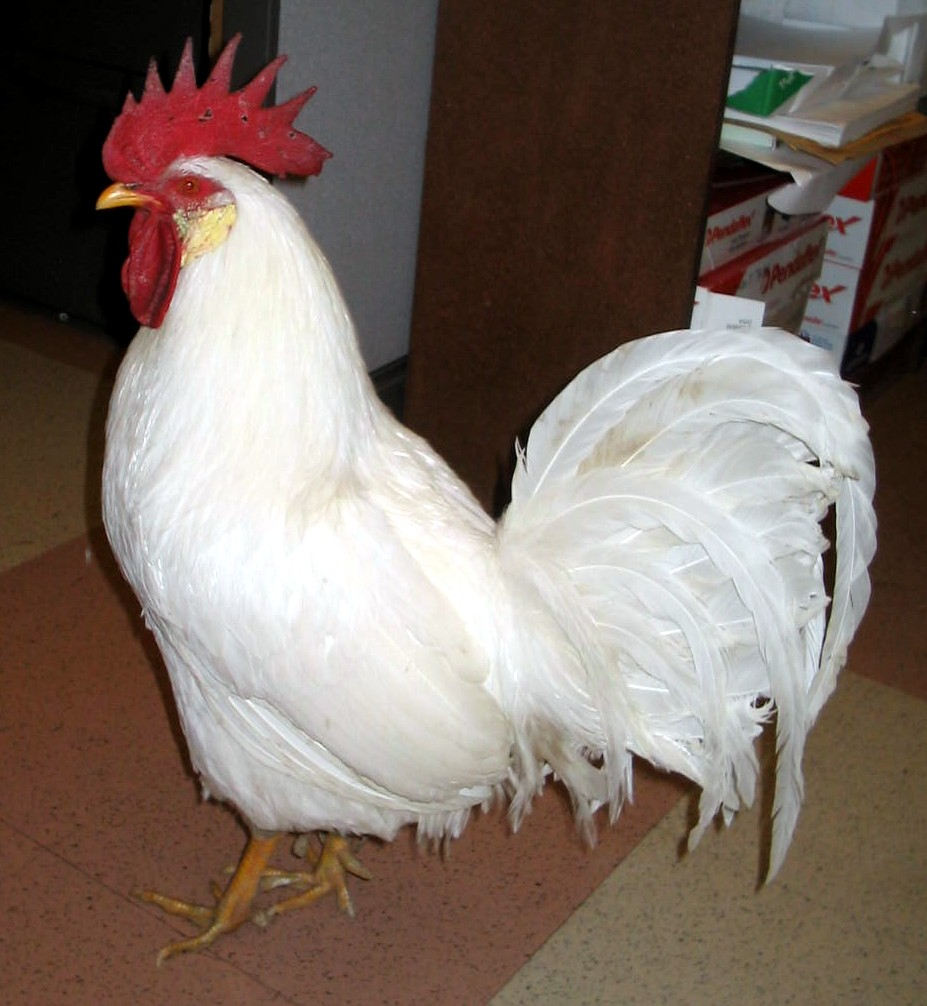
The domesticated white leghorn rooster, a species of rooster used in Eklund and Jensen's experiment

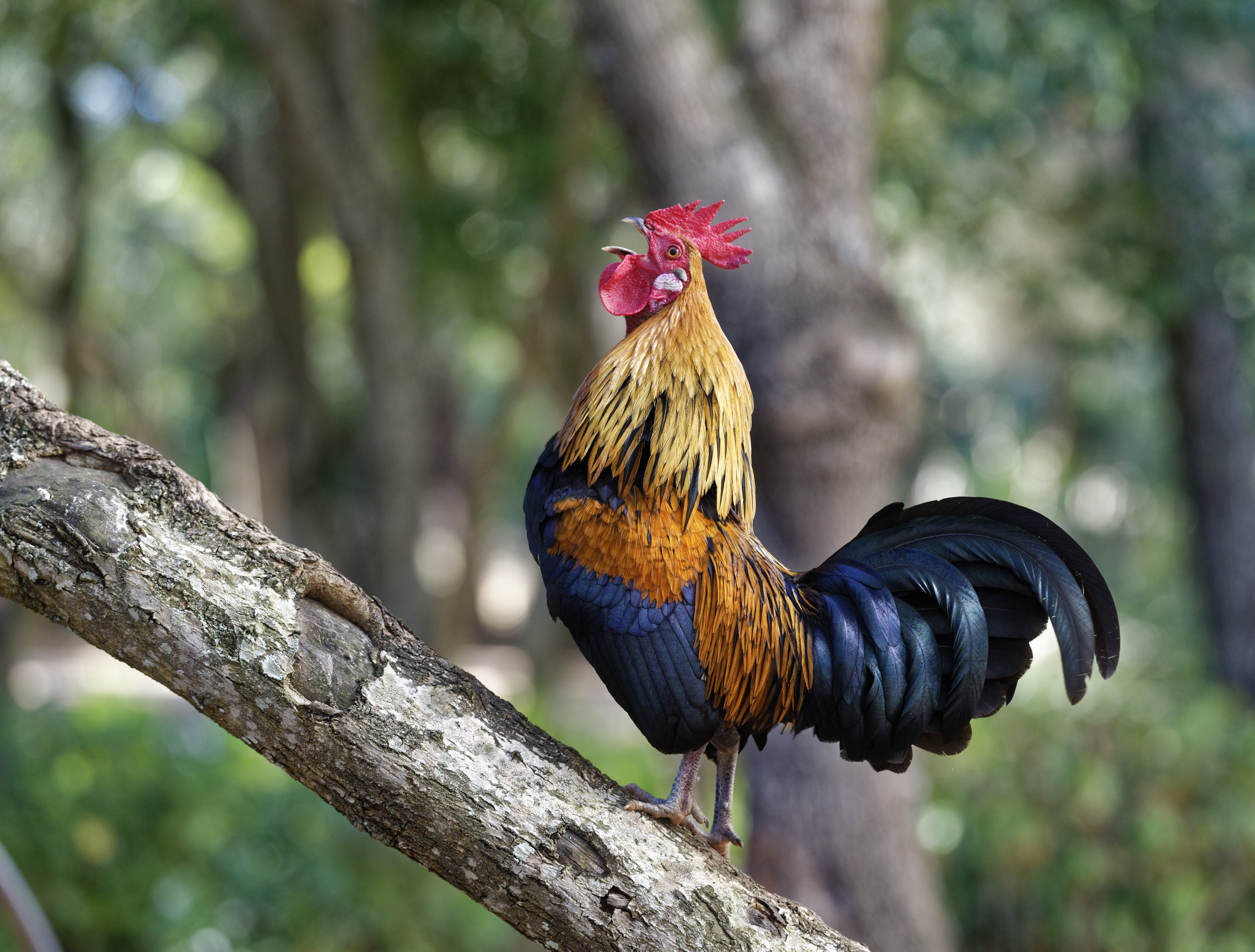
The wild red junglefowl, an ancestral species used in Eklund and Jensen's experiment

Allelomimetic behavior can often be affected by domestication and lead to the evolution of new social behaviors, or subtle changes in current social behaviors. It is thought that domestication would reduce the level of allelomimetic behavior in animals due to the removal of many important factors that create mimicries such as predation, food pressures and competition between species members. Since there is no need to worry about possible predation or a lack of resources in a domesticated environment, the allelomimetic behaviors seen in non-domesticated species evolved out and the adaptation to domestication became the new normal. Mimetic behaviors that once incorporated anti-predator strategies or mating strategies became unnecessary and the use of these behaviors decreased. An experiment was conducted by Eklund and Jensen using an ancestor of all domesticated chickens, the red junglefowl, and a domesticated breed, the white leghorn. They showed that allelomimetic behavior was more prominent and used more frequently in the non-domesticated red junglefowl compared to the white leghorn, most likely due to the chance of predation, starvation, and the lack of shelter playing a role in producing these allelomimetic behaviors. Total synchronization only occurred in both species during comforting behaviors such as perching and dust bathing. In activities outside of comfort behavior, there was little mimetic behavior in the domesticated white leghorn and inter-individual distances presented by the chickens during perching was larger than the non-domesticated species. Perching in the red junglefowl occurred more frequently and was more mimetic than in the white leghorn. The social behavior of the red junglefowl was also affected by allelomimetism, where behaviors such as feather pecking were more synchronized than in the white leghorn. A difference in feeding synchrony also appeared in females versus males. Females were more likely to mimic other females' eating behaviors compared to a mixed-sex group or males mimicking males.
