= Blanche Saunders =

- Born: October 1, 1906; Easton, Maine, United States
- Died: December 8, 1964 (aged 58)
- Education: Massachusetts Agricultural College
- Occupation: Dog trainer
- Years active: 1934–1964

Blanche Saunders (October 1, 1906 - December 8, 1964) was one of the first Americans to popularize dog training, publishing several books and conducting demonstrations in dog obedience.

Saunders graduated from Massachusetts Agricultural College with majors in animal husbandry and poultry raising. Helen Whitehouse Walker, who had at first hired Saunders as a kennel maid in 1934, convinced the American Kennel Club in 1936 that dog obedience was a competitive field, and the following year Walker and Saunders criss-crossed the United States in a 21' trailer with several dogs, making a 10,000-mile obedience-teaching tour, giving lectures and dog obedience demonstrations at dog shows. Saunders later conducted demonstrations in Rockefeller Plaza, and also at Yankee Stadium for seven years.

Saunders was the first dog obedience instructor of the ASPCA in New York (1944–1961), and was training director for the Poodle Obedience Club of Greater New York, the Boxer Obedience Club of Westchester County and the Port Chester Obedience Club.

In 1946, Saunders published her first book, Training You to Train Your Dog. During her lifetime Saunders authored several books, many of which continued to be republished after her death.

== Bibliography ==
- Dog Care and Training for Boys and Girls (1976)
- Dog Care for Boys and Girls (1969)
- Dog Training for Boys and Girls ISBN 1438260733
- Grooming and showing instructions (1958)
- How to Trim, Groom & Show Your Dog (Illustrated) (1968) ASIN B0027AI8WS
- New Standard Book of Dog Care and Training: 1001 Questions Answered (1957) ASIN B0012C2M4M
- The Blanche Saunders' Obedience Training Courses: Novice, Open, Utility, Tracking (1982) ISBN 0876057180
- The Complete Book of Dog Obedience: The Guide for Trainers (1977) ISBN 0876054599
- The Complete Novice Obedience Course: With Blanche Saunders' Guide to Dog Breeds (1969) ISBN 0876057156
- The Complete Novice Obedience Manual (1958) ASIN B000ANCF0U
- The complete open obedience course (1969) ISBN 0876057512
- The Complete Open Obedience Course: How To Train Your Dog ISBN 1438270909
- The Complete Utility Obedience Course with Tracking (1961) ASIN B003Y90PW2
- The Poodle Chart by Blanche Saunders; illus. by John LaPresle (1950) ASIN B005OS8G68
- The Story of Dog Obedience (1975) ASIN B000NLBUGY
- Training You to Train Your Dog (1952) ISBN 9780385042642
