= Dog training =

Practice of teaching behaviors to dogs

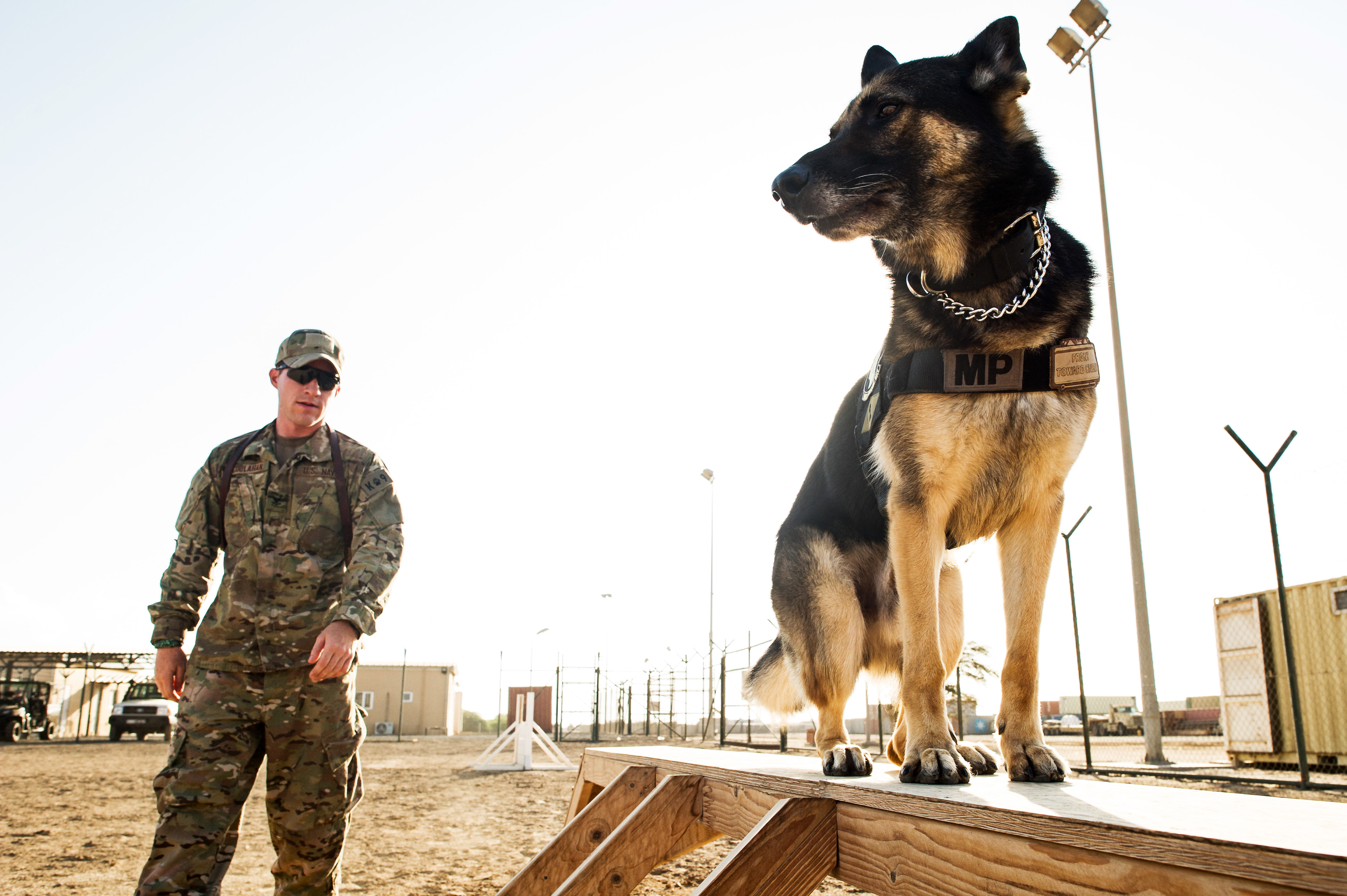
A dog trainer with the United States Navy, which primarily trains using positive reinforcement.

Dog training is a type of animal training, the application of behavior analysis which uses the environmental events of antecedents (trigger for a behavior) and consequences to modify the dog behavior, either for it to assist in specific activities or undertake particular tasks, or for it to participate effectively in contemporary domestic life. While training dogs for specific roles dates back to Roman times at least, the training of dogs to be compatible household pets developed with suburbanization in the 1950s.

A dog learns from interactions it has with its environment. This can be through classical conditioning, where it forms an association between two stimuli; non-associative learning, where its behavior is modified through habituation or sensitisation; and operant conditioning, where it forms an association between an antecedent and its consequence.

Most working dogs are now trained using reward-based methods, sometimes referred to as positive reinforcement training. Other reward-based training methods include clicker training, model-rival training, and relationship-based training.

Training methods that emphasize punishment include the Koehler method, electronic (shock collar) training, dominance-based training, and balanced training. The use of punishment is controversial with both the humaneness and effectiveness questioned by many behaviorists. Furthermore, numerous scientific studies have found that reward-based training is more effective and less harmful to the dog-owner relationship than punishment-based methods.

== Definition ==
Dog training is the act of teaching a dog particular skills or behaviors. Dog training includes teaching a dog to react to particular commands and cues as well as to act independently by deliberately changing their natural behavior.

Dogs have been trained to perform a large number of practical functions including search and rescue, herding livestock, guarding, explosive or drug detection, and disability assistance. Dogs have also been trained to perform recreational functions, including companionship and shooting assistance.

Dog training usually involves the basic obedience training to establish control over the animal and can then progress to more advanced specialist training. Basic obedience training includes teaching a dog:

- Recall – teaching the dog to come on command
- Sit – teaching the dog to sit on command
- Heeling – teaching the dog to walk on or off lead with the handler
- Stay – teaching the dog not to stray on command
- Socialising – neutrality or excitement when appropriate during a reaction with the outside world

== History ==
Although research into how dogs learn and into cross-species communication has changed the approach to dog training in recent decades, understanding the role of early trainers and scientists contributes to an appreciation of how particular methods and techniques developed.

=== Before 1900 ===
In around 127-116 B.C., a Roman farmer, Marcus Varro, recorded advice on raising and training puppies for herding livestock. His writings indicate that not only was dog training for specific tasks well established, but that the value of early training was recognized.

In 1848, W. N. Hutchinson published his book Dog Breaking: The Most Expeditious, Certain and Easy Method, Whether Great Excellence or Only Mediocrity Be Required, With Odds and Ends for Those Who Love the Dog and the Gun. Primarily concerned with training hunting dogs such as pointers and setters, the book advocates a form of reward-based training, commenting on men who have "a strong arm and a hard heart to punish, but no temper and no head to instruct" and suggesting "Be to his virtues ever kind. Be to his faults a little blind." Stephen Hammond, a writer for Forest and Stream magazine, advocated in his 1882 book Practical Training that hunting dogs be praised and rewarded with meat for doing the correct behavior. One of the earliest training manuals for training dogs was published in 1910.

=== War years ===
Konrad Most began training dogs for police work in Germany, and was appointed principal of the State Breeding and Training Establishment for police dogs in Berlin, where he carried out original research into training dogs for a broad range of service tasks. At the outbreak of war in 1914 he was charged with organising and directing the use of dogs to further the war effort. He headed the Experimental Institute for Armed Forces' Dogs during the Second World War, and afterwards ran the German Dog Farm, a centre for the training of working dogs, including assistance dogs for the blind. He played a leading role in the formation of the German Canine Research Society and Society for Animal Psychology. His 1910 publication, Training Dogs: A Manual, emphasized using instinctive behavior such as the prey drive to train desired behaviors, advocated the use of compulsion and inducements, differentiated between primary and secondary reinforcers, and described shaping behaviors, chaining components of an activity, and the importance of timing rewards and punishments. The book demonstrated an understanding of the principles of operant conditioning almost thirty years before they were formally outlined by B.F. Skinner in The Behavior of Organisms. While publishers of the 2001 reprint warn that some of the "compulsive inducements" such as the switch, the spiked collar and the forced compliance are unnecessarily harsh for today's pet dogs, the basic principles of Most's methods are still used in police and military settings.

Marian Breland Bailey played a major role in developing empirically validated and humane animal training methods and in promoting their widespread implementation. Marian was a graduate student under B.F. Skinner. Her first husband Keller Breland also came to study with Skinner and they collaborated with him, training pigeons to guide bombs. The Brelands saw the commercial possibilities of operant training, founding Animal Behavior Enterprises (ABE). In 1955, they opened the "I.Q. Zoo" as both a training facility and a showcase of trained animals. They were among the first to use trained animals in television commercials, and the first to train dolphins and whales as entertainment, as well as for the navy. Keller died in 1965, and in 1976 Marian married Bob Bailey, who had been director of marine mammal training for the navy. They pioneered the use of the clicker as a conditioned reinforcer for training animals at a distance. ABE went on to train thousands of animals of more than 140 species. Their work had significant public exposure through press coverage of ABE-trained animals, bringing the principles of behavior analysis and operant conditioning to a wide audience.

Konrad Lorenz, an Austrian scientist who is regarded as developing the foundations of ethological research, further popularized animal behaviorism with his books, Man Meets Dog and King Solomon's Ring. Lorenz stated that there were three essential commands to teach a dog: "lie down" (stay where you are), "basket" (go over there) and "heel" (come with me).

In 1935, the American Kennel Club began obedience trials, and in the following years popular magazines raised public awareness of the benefits of having a trained pet dog, and of the recreational possibilities of dog training as a hobby. After WWII, the increasing complexities of suburban living demanded that for a pet dog's own protection and its owner's convenience, the dog should be obedient. William Koehler had served as principal trainer at the War Dog Training Center, in California, and after the war became chief trainer for the Orange Empire Dog Club—at the time, the largest dog club in the United States—instructor for a number of breed clubs, and a dog trainer for the Walt Disney Studios.

In 1962, Koehler published The Koehler Method of Dog Training, in which he is highly critical of what he calls "tid-bit training techniques" based in "the prattle of 'dog psychologists'". Amongst the training innovations attributed to Koehler is the use of a long line in conjunction with a complete absence of oral communication as a way of instilling attentiveness prior to any leash training. Koehler insisted that participants in his training classes used "emphatic corrections", including leash jerks and throw chains, claiming that tentative, nagging corrections were cruel in that they caused emotional disturbance to the dog. Vicki Hearne, a disciple of Koehler's, commented on the widespread criticism of his corrections, with the explanation that it was the emotionally loaded language used in the book that led to a number of court cases, and to the book being banned in Arizona for a time. Despite the controversy, his basic method forms the core of many contemporary training systems.

=== Post WWII ===
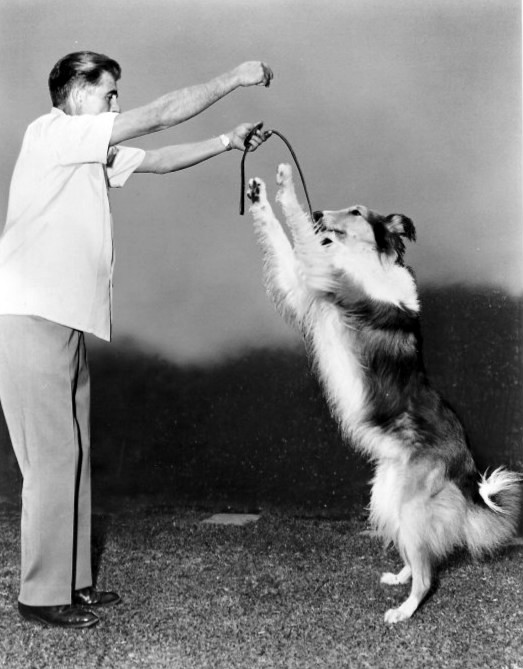
Actor and animal trainer Rudd Weatherwax training Lassie, circa 1955

In the 1950s, Blanche Saunders was a staunch advocate of pet-dog training, travelling throughout the U.S. to promote obedience classes. In The Complete Book of Dog Obedience, she said, "Dogs learn by associating their act with a pleasing or displeasing result. They must be disciplined when they do wrong, but they must also be rewarded when they do right." Negative reinforcement procedures played a key part in Saunders' method, primarily the jerking of the choke chain. The mantra taught to students was "Command! Jerk! Praise!" She felt that food should not be an ongoing reward, but that it was acceptable to use "a tidbit now and then to overcome a problem". Saunders perhaps began the shift away from military and police training methods, stressing repeatedly the importance of reinforcement for good behavior in training—a move toward the positive training methods used today.

In 1965, John Paul Scott and John Fuller identified the critical periods for learning and social development in puppies, and published Genetics and the Social Behavior of the Dog, a landmark study of dog behavior.

The 1980 television series Training Dogs the Woodhouse Way made Barbara Woodhouse a household name in the UK, and the first international celebrity dog trainer. Known for her "no bad dogs" philosophy, Woodhouse was highly critical of "bad owners", particularly those she saw as "overly sentimental". She described the "psychoanalyzing of dogs" as "a lot of rubbish". Her no-nonsense style made her a pop-culture icon, with her emphatic "sit" and catch cry of "walkies" becoming part of the popular vernacular.

The monks of New Skete, who were breeders and trainers of German Shepherds in Cambridge, New York, published How to Be Your Dog's Best Friend: A Training Manual for Dog Owners in 1978 and it became an immediate best seller. Despite advocating a philosophy that "understanding is the key to communication and compassion with your dog", they endorsed confrontational punishments which were later shown to elicit dangerously aggressive responses in many dogs.

In the 1980s, veterinarian and animal behaviorist Ian Dunbar discovered that despite evidence on the peak learning periods in animals, few dog trainers worked with puppies before they were six months old. Dunbar founded Sirius Dog Training, the first off-leash training program specifically for puppies, which emphasizes the importance of teaching bite inhibition, sociality, and other basic household manners, to dogs under six months of age. Dunbar has written numerous books, and is known for his international seminar presentations and award-winning videos on puppy and dog behavior and training.

Prior to the 1980s, Karen Pryor was a marine-mammal trainer who used Skinner's operant principles to teach dolphins and develop marine-mammal shows. In 1984, she published her book, Don't Shoot the Dog: The New Art of Teaching and Training, an explanation of operant-conditioning procedures written for the general public. In the book, Pryor explains why punishment as a way to get people to change often fails, and describes specific positive methods for changing the behavior of husbands, children and pets. Pryor's dog training materials and seminars showed how operant procedures can be used to provide training based on positive reinforcement of good behavior. Pryor and Gary Wilkes introduced clicker training to dog trainers with a series of seminars in 1992 and 1993. Wilkes used aversives as well as rewards, and the philosophical differences soon ended the partnership.

=== 21st century ===
The 21st century has seen a dramatic increase in the adoption of reward-based training. The International Association of Animal Behavior Consultants, the APDT, BC SPCA in Canada, and in the UK the RSPCA, Dogs Trust Blue Cross and the APDT UK, PACT and the Pet Professional Guild now advocate this kind of training exclusively. Veterinarians are also switching to advocating reward-based training, and the 2015 AAHA Canine and Feline Behavior Management Guidelines include guidelines that state that trainers should only use positive methods.

Also, in the 21st century, many countries have adopted laws banning dog training methods using aversives such as the use of shock collars, prong collars and choke collars. Even where legal, "Organizations advocating against the use of prong and choke collars include: CHS, RSPCA UK, RSPCA Australia, RSPCA South Australia, the Canadian Advisory Council on National Shelter Standards, CVMA, ACVB, ABTC, PACT, APDT UK, and APDT".

The 21st century has seen the proliferation of television programs and accompanying books that feature dog training and rehabilitation. "Unfortunately, if dog owners decide to consult a book, some of the most popular – and enduring – dog training books include erroneous information".

21st century dog training TV shows that are primarily entertainment include Joel Silverman's Good Dog U, Dog Whisperer with Cesar Millan, It's Me or the Dog featuring Victoria Stillwell, The Underdog Show, Dogs in the City, and SuperFetch. The Association of Pet Dog Trainers advises that television programs are produced primarily for entertainment, and while all programs will have good and not-so-good points, the viewer should critically evaluate the information before deciding which training tips to adopt.

== How dogs learn ==
=== Operant conditioning ===
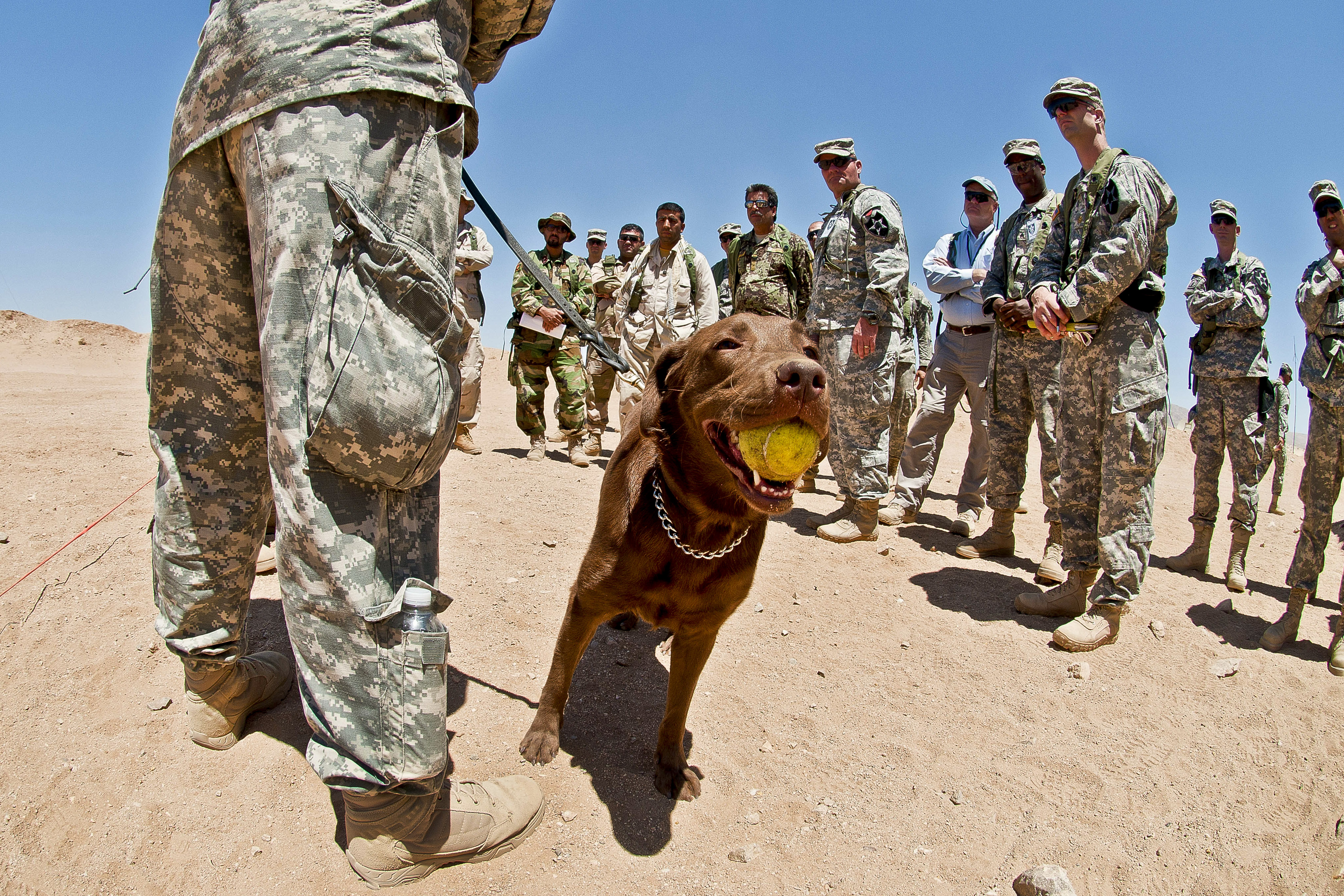
Positive reinforcement can involve a game or toy, such as this tennis ball.

Operant conditioning (or instrumental conditioning) is a form of learning in which an individual's behavior is modified by its consequences. Two complementary motivations drive instrumental learning: the maximization of positive outcomes and minimization of aversive ones. There are two ways in which behavior is reinforced or strengthened: positive reinforcement occurs when a behavior is strengthened by producing some desirable consequence; negative reinforcement occurs when a behavior is strengthened by avoiding some undesirable consequence. There are two ways in which behavior is decreased or weakened: negative punishment occurs when a behavior is weakened by not producing a reinforcing consequence; and positive punishment occurs when a behavior is weakened by producing a consequence that is a disincentive. In combination, these basic reinforcing and punishing contingencies provide four ways for modifying behavior. Reinforcement increases the relative probability or frequency of the behavior it follows, while punishment decreases the relative probability or frequency of the behavior it follows.

Typical positive reinforcement events will satisfy some physiological or psychological need, so it can be food, a game, or a demonstration of affection. Different dogs will find different things reinforcing. Negative reinforcement occurs when a dog discovers that a particular response ends the presentation of an aversive stimulus. An aversive is anything that the dog does not like, such as verbal admonishment, or a tightened choke chain.

Punishment is operationally defined as an event that lowers the probability of the behavior that it follows. It is not "punishment" in the common sense of the word, and does not mean physical or psychological harm and most certainly does not mean abuse. Punishment simply involves the presentation of an undesired consequence (positive punishment) when the wrong behavior is performed, such as a snap of the leash, or the removal of a desired consequence (negative punishment) when the wrong behavior is performed, such as the trainer eating the cheese that would have been the reward. A behavior that has previously been developed may cease if reinforcement stops; this is called extinction. A dog that paws its owner for attention will eventually stop if it no longer receives attention.

=== Classical conditioning ===
Classical conditioning (or Pavlovian conditioning) is a form of learning in which one stimulus, the conditioned stimulus, comes to signal the occurrence of a second stimulus, the unconditioned stimulus. Classical conditioning is when a dog learns to associate things in its environment, or discovers some things just go together. A dog may become afraid of rain through an association with thunder and lightning, or it may respond to the owner putting on a particular pair of shoes by fetching its leash. Classical conditioning is used in dog training to help a dog make specific associations with a particular stimulus, particularly in overcoming fear of people and situations.

=== Non-associative learning ===
Non-associative learning is a change in a response to a stimulus that does not involve associating the presented stimulus with another stimulus or event such as reward or punishment. Habituation is non-associative learning. An example is where a dog that reacts excitedly to a door bell is subjected to repeated ringing without accompanying visitors, and stops reacting to the meaningless stimuli. It becomes habituated to the noise. On the other side of habituation is sensitization. Some dogs' reactions to the stimuli become stronger instead of them habituating to the repeated stimuli or event. Desensitization is the process of pairing positive experiences with an object, person, or situation that causes fear or anxiety. Consistent exposure to the feared object in conjunction with rewards allows the animal to become less stressed, thereby becoming desensitized in the process. This type of training can be effective for dogs who are fearful of fireworks.

Learned irrelevance is where dogs that are overexposed to a stimulus or cue learn the cue is irrelevant because the exposure has proven to be uneventful. So a dog owner who continually says "Sit, sit" without response or consequence, inadvertently teaches the dog to ignore the cue.

Learned helplessness occurs when a dog ceases to respond in a situation where it has no option to avoid a negative event. For learned helplessness to occur, the event must be both traumatic and outside the dog's control. Family dogs that are exposed to unpredictable or uncontrolled punishment are at risk of developing disturbances associated with the learned helplessness disorder. Punishment which is poorly coordinated with identifiable avoidance cues or response options, such as when punishment takes place long after the event, meet the criteria of inescapable trauma.

=== Observational learning ===
Observational learning is the learning that occurs through observing the behavior of others. This form of learning does not need reinforcement to occur; instead, a model animal is required. While the model may not be intentionally trying to instill any particular behavior, many behaviors that are observed are remembered and imitated. The domestic dog is a social species and its social dependency makes it aware of the behavior of others, which contributes to its own behavior and learning abilities. There is, however, ongoing discussion about how much, and how, dogs can learn by interacting with each other and with people.

The term "observational learning" encompasses several closely related concepts: allelomimetic behavior or mimicking where, for example, puppies follow or copy others of their kind; social facilitation where the presence of another dog causes an increase in the intensity of a behavior; and local enhancement which includes pieces of social facilitation, mimicking, and trial-and-error learning, but is different from true observational learning in that the dog actively participates in the behavior in the presence of the other dog or other environmental cues. Four necessary conditions for observational learning are: attention, retention, motivation, and production. That is, the dog must pay attention to the dog or person performing the modelled behavior; retain the information gathered about the behavior during the observation; be motivated to reproduce the behavior in a time and place removed from the original; and finally, produce the behavior, or some reasonable facsimile thereof.

Pups between the ages of 9–12 weeks who were permitted to observe their narcotics-detecting mothers at work generally proved more capable at learning the same skills at six months of age than control puppies the same age who were not previously allowed to watch their mothers working. A 2001 study recorded the behavior of dogs in detour tests, in which a favorite toy or food was placed behind a V-shaped fence. The demonstration of the detour by humans significantly improved the dogs' performance in the trials. The experiments showed that dogs are able to rely on information provided by human action when confronted with a new task. Significantly, they did not copy the exact path of the human demonstrator, but adopted the detour behavior shown by humans to reach their goal. A 1977 experiment by Adler and Adler found that puppies who watched other puppies learn to pull a food cart into their cages by an attached ribbon proved considerably faster at the task when later given the opportunity themselves. At 38 days of age, the demonstrator puppies took an average of 697 seconds to succeed, while the observers succeeded in an average of 9 seconds.

=== Cognitive learning ===
Dogs are capable of cognitive learning, which is distinct from conditioning methods such as operant and classical conditioning. Cognitive learning is a process wherein dogs acquire and process information, rather than develop conditioned responses to stimuli.

One example of cognitive learning in dogs is the fast mapping inferential reasoning demonstrated by Chaser and Rico in controlled research environments. Both Rico and Chaser demonstrated the ability to infer the names of objects without conditioning and remember them indefinitely.

== Training methods ==
=== Positive reinforcement ===
Positive reinforcement training is also known as humane training, force-free training, and reward-based training. Positive reinforcement training employs the use of rewards to reinforce wanted behavior. For unwanted behavior, this training method uses four other techniques: extinction (letting the behavior go away by itself); training an incompatible behavior; putting the behavior on cue (then almost never giving the cue); shaping the absence of the behavior (reinforcing everything that is not the undesired behavior); or changing the environment/motivation. It is based in Thorndike's law of effect, which says that actions that produce rewards tend to increase in frequency and actions that do not produce rewards decrease in frequency.

Positive reinforcement (motivational) training has its roots in marine mammal training, where compulsion and corrections are both difficult and dangerous. Positive reinforcement training requires time and patience to control the rewards the dog receives for behavior, but has no side effects (such as fear or aggression).

Some activities such as jumping up or chasing squirrels are intrinsically rewarding, the activity is its own reward, and with some activities the environment may provide reinforcement such as when the response from a dog next door encourages barking. To change this kind of self-rewarding behavior, since punishment comes with side effects such as "problematic behaviours such as fear and aggression" and extinction does not work in these cases, positive trainers will either train an alternate incompatible behavior, train the opposite behavior (and then not cue it), or change the environment.

"All of the animals used for commercials, TV shows, and movies are trained with positive reinforcement."

The majority of trainers of search-and-rescue dogs prefer to use positive reinforcement and most working dogs are now trained using reward-based methods. These include police dogs, military dogs, guide dogs, and drug detection dogs.

The movement of military dog training to positive reinforcement methods is partly because aversive methods cause "fear or distress and poor performance in military working dogs". Military dogs trained with positive reinforcement "demonstrated increased confidence and overall performance."

=== Clicker training ===
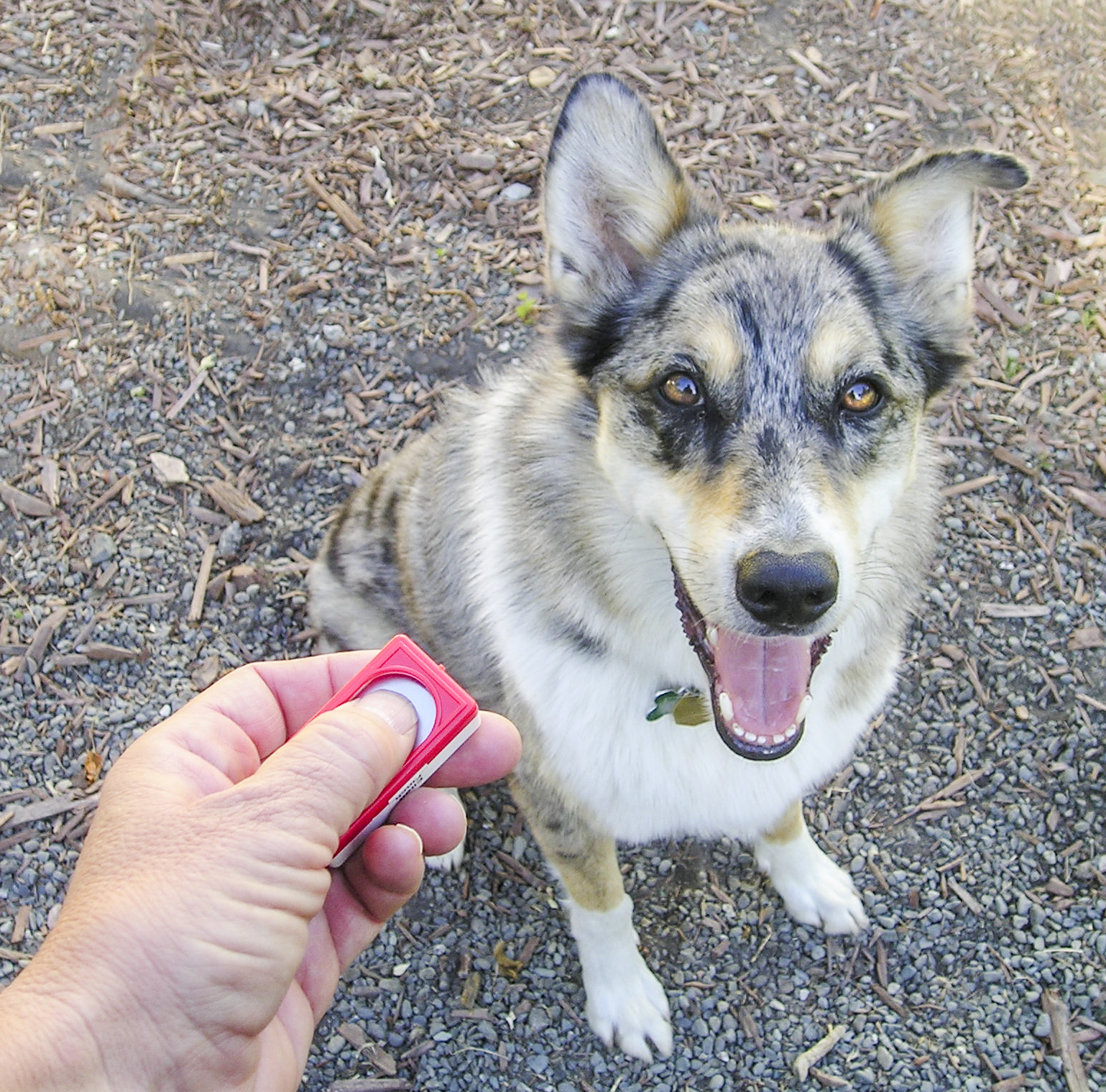
Clicker-training using a metal cricket

Clicker training is a type of positive reinforcement training. Like all positive reinforcement training, clicker training is based on operant conditioning, but it specifically uses a clicker device as a marker and bridge. Clicker training can also be referred to as marker training. The system uses secondary reinforcer (the clicker) as both a marker/signal and a bridge, to let the animal know that s/he performed the desired behavior correctly and therefore a reward is coming, and to avoid inadvertently reinforcing (rewarding) another behavior that may occur after the desired behavior occurs but before the reinforcer is delivered. Primary reinforcers are reinforcers that are required for life, such as food. Secondary reinforcers are things the animal being trained enjoys but that are not required for life, such as toys, praise, etc. The term 'clicker' comes from a small metal cricket adapted from a child's toy that the trainer uses to precisely mark the desired behavior. Positive reinforcement trainers that don't use clickers still usually use some kind of a marker, such as a whistle, a word, or even a light as the secondary reinforcer, which becomes "conditioned" once the animal learns that its arrival signals the chance to earn a primary reinforcer. The trainer delivers a primary reinforcer, such as treat, after the noise or signal.

Critics of clicker training (and positive reinforcement training in general) claim that it is prone to the overjustification effect, although this is a term used in the context of humans, not animal training. It's for this very reason (to prevent this effect) that it's standard practice for trainers do the following: after initial training with a fixed ratio of reinforcement is completed, the reward ratio is switched to a variable ratio, which produces extremely resilient behavior.

Clicker training is so precise that it can be used to "shape" behavior. New trainers have used the precision possible with clickers to introduce techniques that dogs focus calmly, like the "look at that game" and "click to calm".

=== Model-rival training ===
Based on the principles of social learning, model-rival training uses a model, or a rival for attention, to demonstrate the desired behavior. The method was used by Irene Pepperberg to train Alex the African Grey Parrot to label a large number of objects. McKinley and Young undertook a pilot study on the applicability of a modified version of the model-rival method to the training of domestic dogs, noting that the dog's origins as a member of large and complex social groups promote observational learning. The model-rival training involved an interaction between the trainer, the dog, and a person acting as a model-rival, that is, a model for desired behavior and a rival for the trainer's attention. In view of the dog, a dialogue concerning a particular toy commenced between the trainer and the model-rival. The trainer praised or scolded the model-rival depending on whether the model-rival had named the toy correctly. It was found that the performance times for completion of the task were similar for dogs trained with either operant conditioning or the model rival method. In addition, the total training time required for task completion was comparable for both methods.

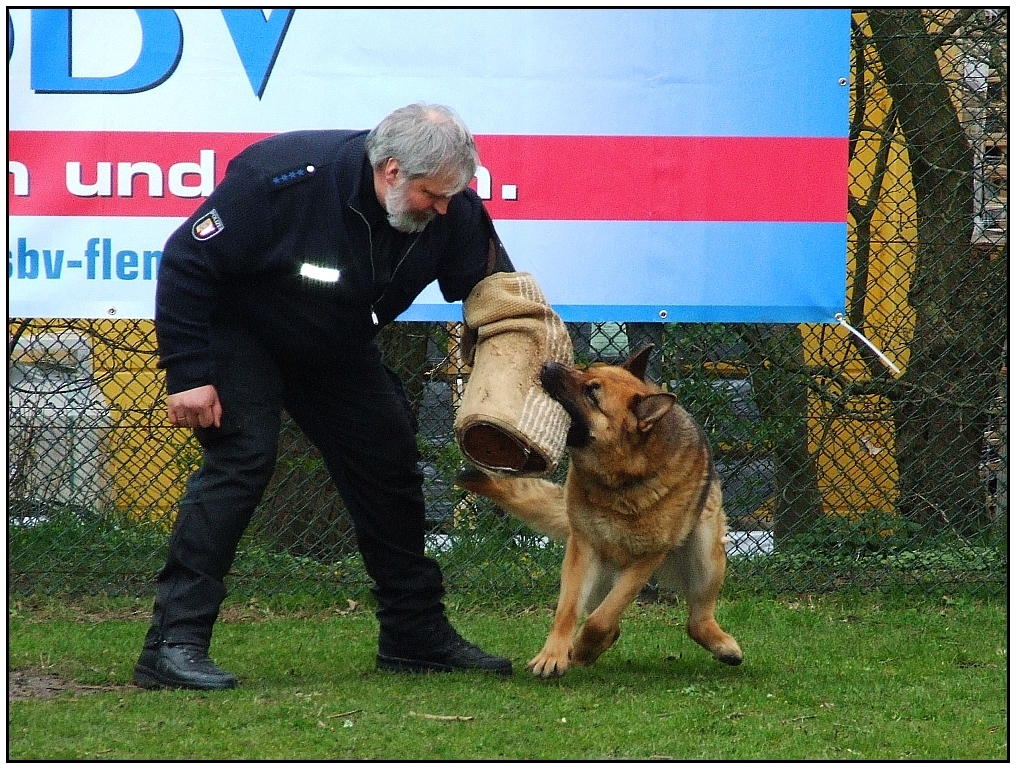
Training a police dog

=== Relationship-based training ===
Relationship-based training is built upon the ideas of symbolic interactionism. This approach takes advantage of the ways dogs and their trainers communicate, understand each other, and make necessary changes. Building on a positive relationship between them, the method sets out to achieve results that benefit both the dog and the trainer, while at the same time enhancing and strengthening their relationship. The basic principles include ensuring that the dog's basic needs have been met before beginning a training session, finding out what motivates the dog and using it to elicit behaviors, interpreting the dog's body language to improve communication between dog and trainer, using positive reinforcement to encourage desired behavior, training incompatible behaviors to replace unwanted behaviors, and controlling the dog's environment to limit the possibility of unwanted behaviours. A relationship-based approach to dog training is not necessarily reliant on using particular training aids or treats but posits that the connection between dog and trainer is sufficiently powerful to achieve the training goals.

=== Koehler method ===
The Koehler method uses primarily punishment and negative reinforcement (the removing of an aversive) to train dogs. The 1962 book, Koehler Method of Dog Training, is the basis of the method taught in both class and private training formats. The method is based in the philosophy that a dog acts on its right to choose its actions and that a dog's learned behavior is an act of choice based on its own learning experience. When those choices are influenced by the expectation of reward, the behavior will most likely be repeated (although the Koehler method uses very few rewards). When a dog's choices are influenced by the anticipation of punishment, they will most likely cease. Once the dog has learned that its choices result in comfort or discomfort it can be taught to make the correct decisions.

In the Koehler method, one example is teaching a dog to lie down. The trainer pulls the dog's front feet forward and pushes down on its back. Once the dog is on the ground, the trainer gives praise. After doing this many times, the dog learns that the trainer wants it to lie down by itself. At that point, if the dog doesn't obey right away, the trainer sharply tugs on the choke collar.

Action→memory→desire encapsulates the learning pattern used by the method; the dog acts, remembers the consequences, and forms the desire to repeat or avoid those consequences. Adherents believe that once the behavior has been correctly taught, it should be performed, thus making any punishing correction, fair, reasonable, and expected.

While the Koehler method has been used since 1962, some (or all) of the punishment procedures described in the book are now considered not necessary, humane, or appropriate by many trainers. These punishers include the use of a throw chain (applying a sharp hit to the rear to surprise the dog without them knowing who hit them), electric shocks, slingshots, and suspending the dog off the ground.

=== Shock collars (electronic training) ===
Electronic training involves the use of an electronic device as an aversive, usually shock collars. This type of dog collar can be triggered remotely at the trainers discretion, or are triggered by barking, or fencing that activates when a dog crosses a buried wire. The most common form of electronic training is the shock collar, although there are also collars that use vibration, tone, or a spray of liquid, typically citronella when triggered. The use of electric shock aversives (shock collars) for training dogs is the subject of considerable controversy. Many European countries view shock collars as animal cruelty and have banned their use. Supporters claim that the use of shock collars allows training at a distance and the potential to eliminate self-rewarding behavior, and point out that properly used, they have less risk of stress and injury than mechanical devices, such as choke collars (illegal in some countries) or prong collars (prong collars are also illegal in many countries). Opponents of shock collars cite the risks of physical and psychological trauma associated with incorrect or abusive use.

A 2017 meta-review of seventeen peer-reviewed studies found that, even when used correctly, "The results show that using aversive training methods (e.g., positive punishment and negative reinforcement) can jeopardize both the physical and mental health of dogs."

Three of the seventeen studies are summarized here:

In a 2007 study, laboratory-bred Beagles were divided into three groups. Group A received an electric shock when the dogs touched the prey (a rabbit dummy fixed to a motion device). Group H received a shock when they did not obey a previously trained recall command during hunting. Dogs in group R received the electric shock arbitrarily, i.e. the shock was administered unpredictably and out of context. Group A did not show a significant rise in stress-indicating salivary cortisol levels, while group R and group H did show a significant rise. This led to the conclusion that animals which were able to clearly associate the electric stimulus with their action, i.e. touching the prey, and consequently were able to predict and control the stressor, did not show considerable or persistent stress indicators, while animals that were not able to control the situation to avoid the shock did show significant stress. The 2017 Ziv meta-review suggested that this 2007 study was flawed. "In the first group, the predictability of the shock could have led to the relatively small increase in cortisol levels, but another explanation is possible. While an increase in the concentration of cortisol can represent an increase in stress", it can also represent the physical activity level of the dog. Indeed, elevation in cortisol concentration can occur as a result of both low-intensity and high-intensity exercise.

In 2004, a study was published that was based on the observation of a variety of breeds trained for protection work using shock collars, which showed that although using shock collars to train guard dogs can work, it can cause side effects of fear and aggression, indicating heightened uncertainty and reactivity. The study summarized by stating "The conclusions, therefore are, that being trained is stressful, that receiving shocks is a painful experience to dogs, and that the S-dogs evidently have learned that the presence of their owner (or his commands) announces reception of shocks, even outside of the normal training context." In 2005, textbook author Stephen R. Lindsay gives his opinion of this study, writing "Schilder and Van der Borg (2004) have published a report of disturbing findings regarding the short-term and long- term effects of shock used in the context of working dogs that is destined to become a source of significant controversy... The absence of reduced drive or behavioral suppression with respect to critical activities associated with shock (e.g., bite work) makes one skeptical about the lasting adverse effects the authors claim to document. Although they offer no substantive evidence of trauma or harm to dogs, they provide loads of speculation, anecdotes, insinuations of gender and educational inadequacies, and derogatory comments regarding the motivation and competence of IPO trainers in its place."

A 2009 study by Herron et al. suggest that aversives such as shock collars, as well as lesser aversives such as yelling, risk side effects of increasing behavior problems including aggression.

=== Dominance-based training ===
The concepts of "pack" and "dominance" in relation to dog training originated in the 1940s and were popularized by the Monks of New Skete in the 1970s. The model is based on a theory that "dogs are wolves" and since wolves live in hierarchical packs where an alpha male rules over everyone else, then humans must dominate dogs in order to modify their behavior. However, recent studies have shown that wolves in the wild actually live in nuclear families where the mother and father are both considered the pack leaders, and their offspring's status depends on their birth order which does not involve fighting to attain a higher rank, because the young wolves naturally follow their parents' lead.

Animal behaviorists assert that using dominance to modify a behavior can suppress the behavior without addressing the underlying cause of the problem. It can exacerbate the problem and increase the dog's fear, anxiety, and aggression. Dogs that are subjected to repeated threats and harsh methods such as the alpha roll may react with aggression not because they are trying to be dominant, but because they feel threatened and afraid.

Researchers have described several reasons why the dominance model is a poor choice for dog training. First, a relationship based on dominance is established to gain priority access to scarce resources, not to impose particular behaviors on the less dominant animal, so the dominance model is irrelevant for most of the behaviors that people want from their dogs, such as coming when called or walking calmly on a leash. Second dominance-submission relationships, once established, are constantly tested and must be regularly reinforced. Thus people, particularly children and the elderly, may not be able to retain their rank and are at risk of being injured if they attempt to do so. Third, dominant individuals gain priority access to resources, but only while they are present, establishing dominance over a dog does not guarantee its behavior when the dominant individual is distant or absent.

The idea of dominance in dogs is not disputed in peer-reviews papers, but rather, popular argument is over its definition and implications. " Although dominance is correctly a property of relationships, it has been erroneously used to describe a supposed trait of individual dogs, even though there is little evidence that such a trait exists".

Defenders of dominance-based training argue that critics are motivated by political correctness. Portuguese author on the behavior of animals Roger Abrantes gives this argument and also argues that the term is poorly defined. Colin Tennant, who is the chairman of the Canine and Feline Behaviour Association, said: "It is political correctness. If you treat a dog like a human it will treat you like a dog". Psychologist and dog trainer Stanley Coren in the 2001 book How to Speak Dog wrote, "You are the alpha dog... You must communicate that you are the pack leader and dominant". Mexican-American dog trainer and author Cesar Millan wrote that, "It's essential that the humans be Pack Leaders, with the dog following. If a dog does not have strong pack leadership from its humans, it may become unbalanced, which can lead to confusion, anxiety, or aggression and behavior problems in the dog".

== Factors ==
Training can take as many forms as there are trainers, however a detailed study of animal trainers found common characteristics of successful methods: thoughtful interpretation of what the animal does prior to training, accurate timing, and consistent communication.

=== Communication ===
Dogs have become closely associated with humans through domestication and have also become sensitive to human communicative signals. Generally, they have a lot of exposure to human speech, especially during play, and are believed to have a good ability to recognize human speech. Two studies investigated the ability of a single dog that was believed to be exceptional in its understanding of language. Both studies revealed the potential for at least some dogs to develop an understanding of a large number of simple commands on the basis of just the sounds emitted by their owners. However, the studies suggested that visual cues from the owner may be important for the understanding of more complex spoken commands.

=== Understanding ===
Consistency of the owner's application, their level of understanding, and training/behavior and level of engagement can influence the effectiveness of any technique.

=== Innate characteristics ===
In considering the natural behaviors of specific breeds of dogs, it is possible to train them to perform specialized, highly useful, tasks. For example, Labrador Retrievers are the favored breed for the detection of explosives. This is because of a combination of factors including their food drive which enables them to keep focused on a task despite noise and other distractions.

Most working breeds of dogs like Dobermans are able to be trained to find people with their sense of smell (as opposed to their sense of sight).

Cocker Spaniels are able to be trained as part of a termite detection team. Their relatively small size enables them to fit into small spaces, and their light weight allows them to walk on areas of ceiling which would be dangerous to anything heavier. In fact, although unusual, termite detection dogs are much more reliable at detecting termites than humans who rely on a basic system of tapping and listening.

Because of their ability to learn signals by sight and for their energetic and athletic natures, German Shepherds are able to be trained for work alongside search and rescue teams and human apprehension teams.

== Individualized or class training ==
Individualized or one-to-one training is helpful for the trainer to focus on an individual dog's abilities and needs, as well as address a specific owner's preferences and circumstance. Any behaviour problems are best addressed by a dog behaviourist. Class training can be effective in encouraging socialization and play with a peer group. Classes are often offered at a more affordable rate and can cover both problem behaviors and teach new skills. Classes can range from puppy and beginner training to more advanced training and skill training such as performing tricks, preparing for dog sports such as agility or flyball, or therapy work.

== Specialized training ==
Dogs are also trained for special purposes such as CGC Certification; for dog sports, including but not limited to competition obedience, dog agility, herding, tracking, and flyball; and to undertake particular roles such as detection dogs, assistance dogs, hunting dogs, police dogs, SAR (search and rescue dogs) or guard dogs.

== Tools ==
Tool	Definition
Head halter or head collar	The head halter is a bitless bridle, but for dogs, not horses. It fastens around the back of the dog's neck and over the top of the muzzle, giving more control over a dog's direction and the intensity of pulling on a leash than most collars that fit strictly around the neck. Pressure on this type of collar pulls the dog's nose and consequently their head towards the handler. The head halter is controversial in some quarters.
No-pull dog harness	The no-pull harness is worn on the body of the animal. The no-pull harness differs significantly from the standard harness since it makes it harder for the dog to pull. Several designs exist, including an attachment point for the leash on the dog's chest, which turn's the dog's shoulders to one side when it pulls, or by constricting across the shoulders and back. Like the head halter, the no-pull harness does not teach the dog not to pull, it only makes it more physically difficult for the dog to continue pulling.
Dog bite tug toys	A bite training tug is a tool usually used for prey drive and retrieve developing skills. Bite training tug is frequently used in to teach a directed bite as in police, military and Schutzhund dog training. Tug "toys" made of any combination of fleece, fur, and rubber are often used as motivators when training in dog sports such as dog agility and flyball. Tugs and toys are often used by reward-based (positive reinforcement) trainers when the dog is more motivated by playing than by food.
Training treats	According to the Arizona State University, less research has been studied on what methods of dog training has been used for people who own dogs in the U.S. Training treats may be used as rewards for completing the desired behavior by trainers who practice reward-based (positive reinforcement) training. While resistance to using food for dog training is a common sticking point in the adoption of humane methods, food, including training treats, is a more effective reward than either petting or praise.
Dog Clicker	A clicker is a small instrument, usually made of plastic and containing a small strip of bent metal that makes a "click" noise when depressed. The metal may be pressed directly with the thumb or by an external button. Clickers are often used in positive reinforcement-based training (or "Clicker training") to indicate to the dog when it has completed the desired behavior.
Aversive collars	Collars that apply pain (the aversive) during training, including the following (which are illegal in some countries): Remote electric shock collar; Prong collar (pinch collar); Choke chain (slip chain or check chain)

== See also ==
- List of dog breeds
- Alpha roll
- Bark (dog)
- Conformation showing
- Dog agility
- Dog sports
- List of dog trainers
- Dog bite prevention

General:

- Animal cognition
- Animal training
- Ethology
- Operant conditioning
- Classical conditioning
- Punishment (psychology)
- Reinforcement
- Reward system
- Dog behaviorist
