= Patricia McConnell =

American Applied Animal Behaviorist, Author, Educator (born 1948)

Patricia McConnell Ph.D / CAAB
- Born: 16 November 1948 (age 77); Phoenix, Arizona, United States
- Occupations: Ethologist, Dog trainer, Animal Behaviorist, Radio Personality, Author
- Years active: 1988–present
- Employer(s): University of Wisconsin-Madison, McConnell Publishing
- Known for: Internationally recognized expert in animal behavior, The Other End of the Leash (book), For the Love of a Dog (book/winner of Audie award); The Education of Will (book)
- Spouse: James Billings
- Website: www.patriciamcconnell.com

Patricia Bean McConnell, Ph.D, CAAB Emeritus (née Patricia Bean; born November 16, 1948) is an ethologist who consulted with pet dog and cat owners for over thirty years regarding serious behavioral problems, has given seminars on companion animal behavior both domestically and internationally, and has written several books on training and behavior relating to their dogs.

== Early life and education ==
McConnell was born in Phoenix, Arizona, in 1948. She is the youngest of three siblings. Her sisters are Liza Piatt of Thousand Oaks, California, and the poet Wendy Barker of San Antonio, Texas.

McConnell is a trained ethologist, a Certified Applied Animal Behaviorist (see Association for the Study of Animal Behaviour), and received her Ph.D. in Zoology from the University of Wisconsin-Madison in 1988. Her doctoral dissertation, "Acoustic structure and receiver response in mammalian signal systems", won the Warder Clyde Allee competition the same year. The W.C. Allee award is presented to a student in a juried competition who demonstrated the best presentation of ethological research.

== Career ==
=== Dog's Best Friend ===
The same year she earned her Ph.D., McConnell founded Dog's Best Friend, Ltd. with her business partner, Nancy Raffetto. For 30 years, McConnell used her expertise and education to help people understand their dog's behaviors. The business started as the duo using their knowledge of animal behavior to help people address serious behavior problems in dogs. They were the only animal behavior practitioners of positive reinforcement in the area, a technique that was considered "unconventional" at the time.

When McConnell retired, she sold Dog's Best Friend Training, LLC, which is now owned and operated by Aimee Moore of Madison, WI. In 2017, the Association of Professional Dog Trainers (the largest professional dog training/canine behavior community in the world) awarded Dr. McConnell a lifetime achievement award for "outstanding contributions to the association and the dog training industry" throughout her career.

=== Academia ===
McConnell taught "The Biology and Philosophy of Human/Animal Relationships" in the Department of Integrative Biology (formerly the Department of Zoology) for twenty-five years at the University of Wisconsin-Madison. She retired from the University of Wisconsin-Madison in May 2015.

=== Radio ===
From 1994 to 2008, McConnell was the co-host of the weekly one-hour radio show, "Calling All Pets", which was produced by Wisconsin Public Radio. For over 500 episodes, McConnell dispensed advice to a national audience about canine behavior problems and information about animal behavior research. The syndicated show played in more than 110 cities for fourteen years. Hosts McConnell and Larry Meiller's partnership started when McConnell was promoting a herding dog trial on Meiller's daily radio show, which was very popular. A producer asked if she'd consider coming on more frequently to talk about animal behavior, and eventually, "Calling All Pets" hit the airwaves.

== Publications ==
McConnell was the behavior columnist for The Bark Magazine, a popular magazine addressing dog culture, ownership, canine news and pet ownership. The Bark Magazine was absorbed by "The Wildest", a site dedicated to addressing the health, behavior and lifestyle of pets. She was also a consulting editor for the Journal of Comparative Psychology.

Her books include The Other End of the Leash (published by Ballantine Books), and her memoir, The Education of Will (published by Simon and Schuster). Her book, For the Love of a Dog, won an Audie award for its audiobook in 2007. She has also produced a number of pet training DVDs. In both her academic and popular writing she has focused on issues of interspecies communication.

McConnell published Away To Me, her first work of fiction, in February 2026. The main character, Maddie McGowan, is an animal behaviorist who lives on a farm in Wisconsin and specializes in dog behavior.

McConnell runs her own publishing company, McConnell Publishing.

== Personal life ==
McConnel lives in on a farm in Wisconsin with her husband, Jim. She has two border collies, Maggie and Skip, and a flock of sheep. In her memoir The Education of Will, she discusses her PTSD as a result of sexual assault she had suffered when she was younger.

== Selected bibliography ==
- —; Jeffrey R. Baylis (December 1985). "Interspecific Communication in Cooperative Herding: Acoustic and Visual Signals from Human Shepherds and Herding Dogs". Zeitschrift für Tierpsychologie. 67 (1–4): 302–328. Bibcode:1985Ethol..67..302M. doi:10.1111/j.1439-0310.1985.tb01396.x.
- — (2003). The other end of the leash : why we do what we do around dogs. New York: Ballantine Books. ISBN 978-0345446787. (Published in 12 languages)
- — (2007). For the love of a dog : understanding emotion in you and your best friend. New York: Ballantine Books. ISBN 978-0345477156. (Audie Award, as the Best Audio Book of 2007)
- — (2018). The Education of Will. New York: Atria Books. ISBN 978-1501150173.
