= Social facilitation in animals =

Mechanism of animal behavior propagation

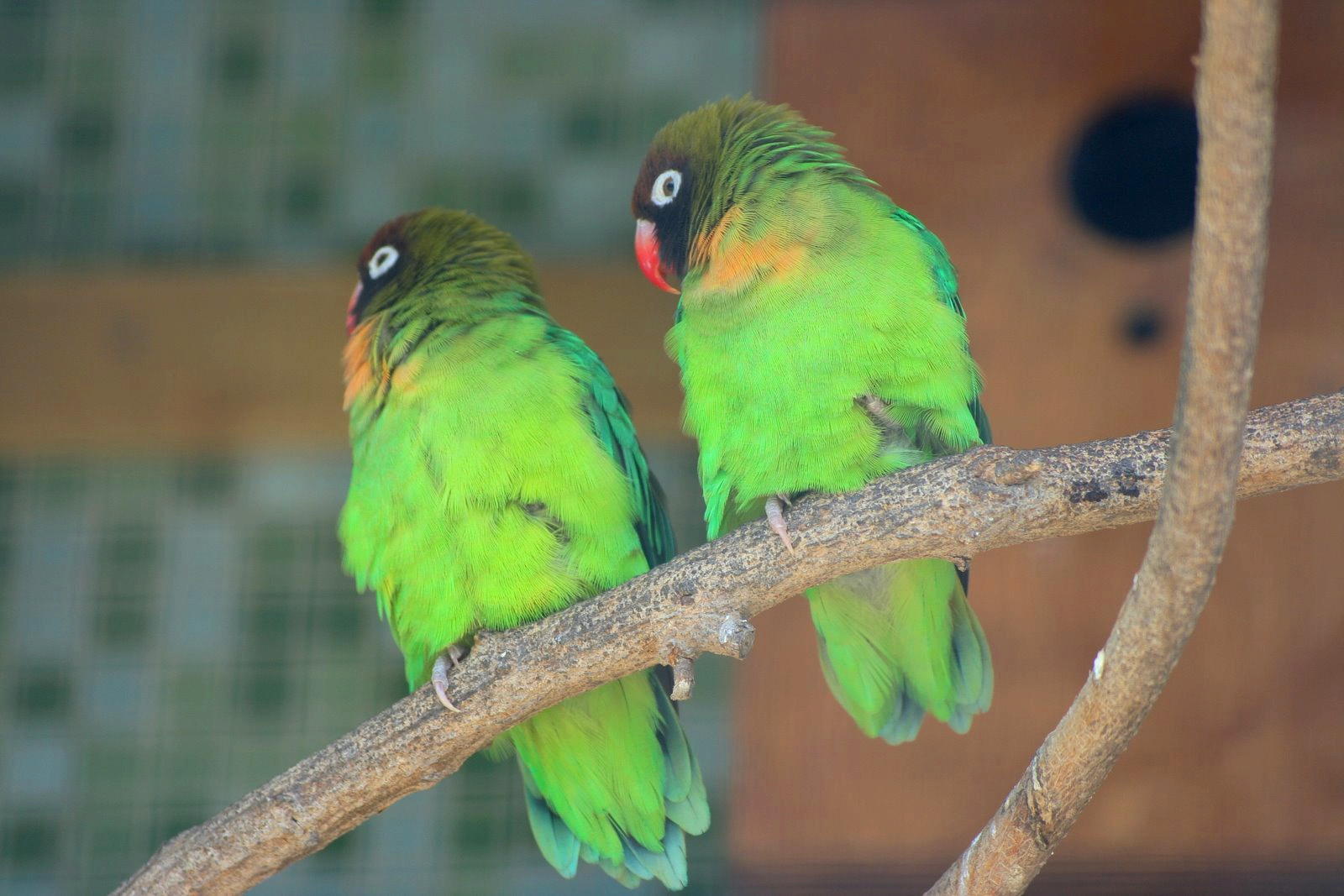
Lovebirds are well known for mirroring the behaviour of their cage-mates, a form of social facilitation

Social facilitation in animals is when the performance of a behaviour by an animal increases the probability of other animals also engaging in that behaviour or increasing the intensity of the behaviour. More technically, it is said to occur when the performance of an instinctive pattern of behaviour by an individual acts as a releaser for the same behaviour in others, and so initiates the same line of action in the whole group. It has been phrased as "The energizing of dominant behaviors by the presence of others."

Social facilitation occurs in a wide variety of species under a range of circumstances. These include feeding, scavenging, teaching, sexual behaviour, coalition formation, group displays, flocking behaviour, and dustbathing. For example, in paper wasp species, Agelaia pallipes, social facilitation is used to recruitment to food resources. By using chemical communication, A. pallipes pool the independent search efforts to locate and defend food sources from other organisms.

Social facilitation is sometimes used to develop successful social scavenging strategies. Griffon vultures are highly specialized scavengers that rely on finding carcasses. When foraging, griffon vultures soar at up to 800 m above the ground. Although some fresh carcasses are located directly by searching birds, the majority of individuals find food by following other vultures, i.e. social facilitation. A chain reaction of information transfer extends from the carcass as descending birds are followed by other birds, which themselves cannot directly see the carcass, ultimately drawing birds from an extensive area over a short period of time.

Moller used a play-back technique to investigate the effects of singing by the black wheatear (Oenanthe leucura) on the behaviour of both conspecifics and heterospecifics. It was found that singing increased in both groups in response to the wheateater and Moller suggested the conspicuous dawn (and dusk) chorus of bird song may be augmented by social facilitation due to the singing of conspecifics as well as heterospecifics.

== See also ==
- Behavioral contagion
- Social facilitation
