= Shock collar =

Behavioral-purposed device to inflict aversive stimulus

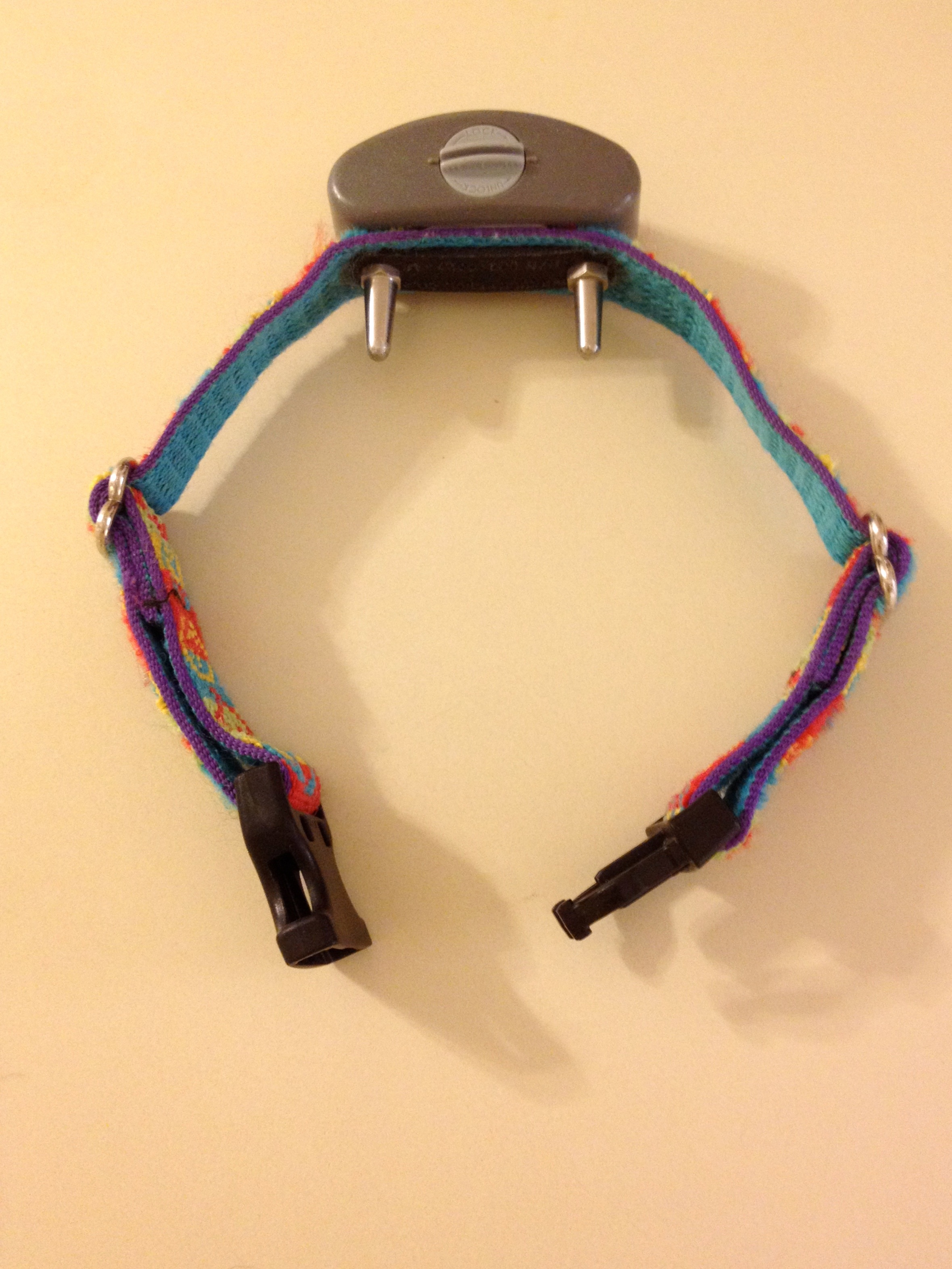
A typical shock collar.

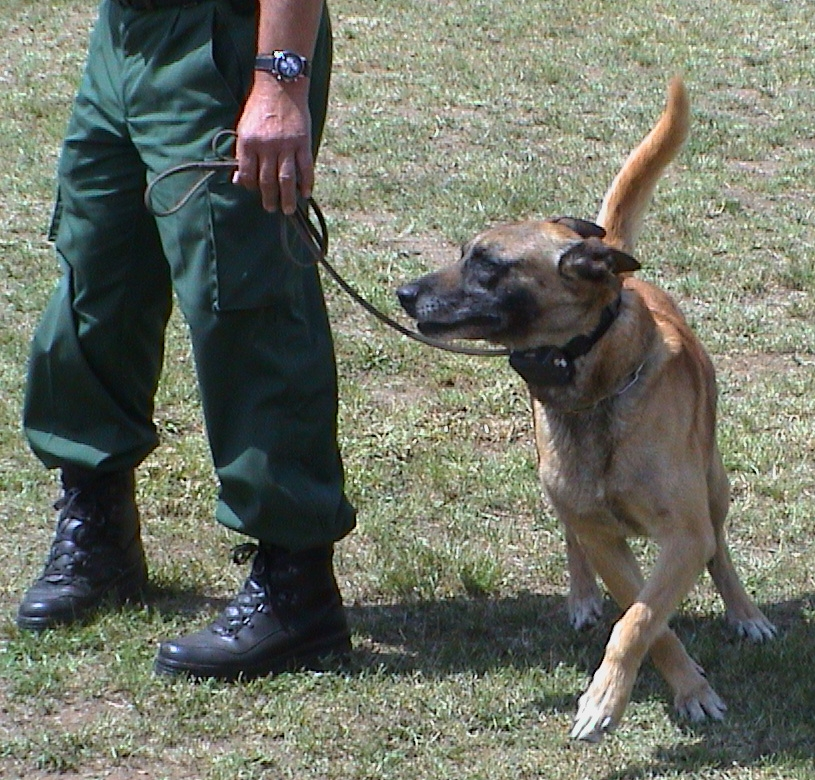
Shock collar used on a riot police dog in 2004 in Würzburg. Two years later, Germany banned the use of shock collars, even by police.

A shock collar, also known as an e-collar, Ecollar, or electronic collar, is a type of collar that delivers electrical current to the neck of its wearer (usually a dog), in an effort to control behaviour as a form of aversive training. These collars incorporate an electronic device that can either trigger automatically as in the case of bark control collars, or electronic fence systems, or may be triggered via a remote control. Many object to the use of shock collars as animal cruelty as they can cause discomfort, pain and fear, and several countries and regions have banned their use. Some models offer additional features such as a tone or vibrational setting that can be used as an alternative or in combination with the shock, and may incorporate GPS functionality to track the collar's location.

Shock collars were initially developed for training hunting dogs in the 1960s, and were originally designed with only one high level of power. Many modern versions are capable of delivering varying levels of shock. In areas where shock collars are legal, they are generally accessible, although Petco took the lead as the first major U.S. retailer to cease their sale. Where permitted, shock collars have been used in a range of applications, including behavioral modification, obedience training, and pet containment, as well as military, police and service training.

== Types ==
=== Invisible fences ===
Pet containment systems, or invisible fences, are designed to keep an animal within a boundary, such that the wearer is shocked when they try to leave a boundary defined by a hidden wire, or by a set of co-ordinates (in conjunction with a GPS receiver).

These systems are illegal for use with pets in 14 countries and discouraged under existing animal welfare laws in others, such as Scotland.

=== Bark control shock collars ===
Bark control shock collars are used to curb excessive or nuisance barking by delivering a shock at the moment the dog begins barking. Bark collars can be activated by microphone or vibration, and some of the most advanced collars use both sound and vibration to eliminate the possibility of extraneous noises activating a response.

=== Remote shock collars ===
Remote shock collars can be activated by a handheld device to give the dog an electric shock which causes pain. Remote shock collars can deliver variable shocks in variable duration and intensities, and may additionally have a beep or vibration option for getting the dog's attention without the use of an electric shock.

Remote shock collars use operant conditioning either as a form of positive punishment, where the correction is applied at the moment an undesired behavior occurs to reduce the frequency of that behavior—or as a form of negative reinforcement, where a continuous stimulation is applied until the moment a desired behavior occurs, to increase the frequency of that behavior.

== How they work in training ==
Shock collars are used in dog training primarily within the framework of operant conditioning, in which behavior is modified through the systematic application of consequences. Depending on how they are applied, shock collars can function either as positive punishment (the delivery of an aversive stimulus following an unwanted behavior) or as negative reinforcement (the removal or avoidance of an aversive stimulus when the desired behavior is performed).

In positive punishment, the electrical stimulus is delivered immediately after an undesired behavior in order to reduce the future frequency of that behavior. In negative reinforcement, the stimulus is applied continuously or in anticipation of a behavior and is terminated when the dog performs the desired response, thereby reinforcing that response through relief from the aversive stimulus.

The effectiveness and side effects of shock collar training are strongly influenced by timing, predictability, and consistency. For conditioning to occur, the stimulus must be closely paired in time with the target behavior, and the dog must be able to associate the stimulus with its own actions rather than with unrelated environmental cues or the presence of the handler. Poor timing or inconsistent application can lead to confusion, ineffective learning, or the development of unintended associations.

From a learning theory perspective, shock collars operate through aversive control, in contrast to reward-based methods that rely primarily on positive reinforcement. Reviews and studies have reported that avoidance-based training can produce rapid behavioral suppression but may be associated with elevated stress responses and less reliable generalization compared with reward-based methods., in contrast to reward-based methods that rely primarily on positive reinforcement. In positive reinforcement training, desired behaviors are increased by the delivery of rewards such as food, play, or social interaction, without the use of aversive stimuli. Marker training, which uses a conditioned reinforcer such as a clicker or verbal marker to signal correct behavior, is commonly combined with positive reinforcement to improve precision and learning speed.

Shock collar training is also related to avoidance learning, in which the animal learns to perform a behavior to prevent or terminate an aversive stimulus. In such cases, behavior may be maintained by the anticipation of the stimulus rather than by the presence of a reward.[citation needed] Studies in animal learning have shown that avoidance-based training can produce rapid behavioral suppression but may be associated with elevated stress responses and less reliable generalization compared with reward-based methods. Studies in animal learning have shown that avoidance-based training can produce rapid behavioral suppression but may be associated with elevated stress responses and less reliable generalization compared with reward-based methods.

== Opinions about the amount of pain caused by shock collars ==
Pain is a difficult outcome to measure because its nature is both multifaceted and subjective, as a result, researchers disagree on how much pain a shock collar causes.

Dr Diane Frank, in the Australian Veterinary Journal, argues that shock collars for dogs inflict pain and distress. "Electric shock hurts and the same shock will be perceived differently by different dogs. Regardless, if the dog perceives pain, [it] experiences a stress response that actively interferes with learning positive, more favourable, substitute behaviour. If the shock and pain are profound, it is possible to induce almost immediate long-term potentiation (LTP), or the molecular changes associated with hippocampal memory, which will lead to a strong aversion or phobia."

In contrast, Steven R. Lindsay, in the 2013 edition of his textbook on training and behavior, stated: "At low levels, the term shock is hardly fitting ... since there is virtually no effect beyond a pulsing tingling or tickling sensation on the surface of the skin ... the word shock is loaded with biased connotations, images of convulsive spasms and burns, and implications associated with extreme physical pain, emotional trauma, physiological collapse, and laboratory abuses ... the stimulus or signal generated by most modern devices is highly controlled and presented to produce a specific set of behavioral and motivational responses to it." Lindsay does note that higher levels of shock from these collars do cause "fear" and "acute pain".

In 2000, prior to Germany's ban on shock collars, Dr. Dieter Klein, in an article published in the German trade magazine "Office for Veterinary Service and Food Control", stated that shock collars for dogs cause minimal pain, comparing the impact of shock collars to other devices utilizing electrical stimulation. "Modern devices ... are in a range in which normally no organic damage is being inflicted. The electric properties and performances ... are comparable to the electric stimulation devices used in human medicine. Organic damage, as a direct impact of the applied current, can be excluded."

== Comparing pain levels: evaluating different amperages ==
The intensity of pain caused by electric current can vary significantly due to small changes in amperage. This pain can be further amplified by adjusting the pulse rate and pulse duration.

Other factors such as voltage, waveform, and frequency of the waveform are not particularly relevant when it comes to assessing the level of pain. While these factors can be used to calculate the amount of energy applied in Joules, they do not indicate the actual intensity of the stimulus or how it will be perceived by the recipient.

In 2004, Dr. Dieter Klein conducted research and estimated that commercial shock collars, which were later banned in Germany, operated at a minimum setting of 30 milliamps and a maximum setting of 80 milliamps. Another commonly-cited study, conducted by Christiansen et al., utilized shock collars with a higher intensity, reaching up to 400 milliamps. These figures do not directly translate into a specific level of perceived pain, because collar design, pulse structure, electrode contact, and individual sensitivity strongly influence how a given current is experienced.

Depending on design, some shock collars can be set so that at the lowest level, the shock delivered is only mildly uncomfortable, and at the highest level produce acute pain. Variable settings of this kind are essential, so that the shock collar can be adjusted to provide the level of pain that changes the dog's behavior, as situations change.

Shock collars are sometimes referred to as delivering a "static shock." However, static electricity is simple direct current and carries little energy, on the order of millijoules. Shock collars do not use simple direct current because the effect is too unpredictable, but rather, use pulsed direct current producing an effect resembling the square wave of alternating current. It is therefore inappropriate to refer to shock collars as delivering a static shock.

Consistent pain delivery requires good contact between the collar electrodes and the dog's shock skin. The shock collar must be fitted according to the manufacturer's instructions. Local humidity and individual variation in coat density, skin thickness and surface conductivity, also affect the delivery of the pain.

Individual variations in temperament, pain sensitivity and susceptibility to startle in dogs mean that settings must be carefully adjusted to produce pain that is perceived by the dog as only just aversive enough to stop the dog engaging in the unwanted behavior. Normally salient stimuli, such as noises, commands and even shocks, may have no effect on a dog that is highly aroused and focused on an activity such as hunting.

Individual shocks delivered by a shock collar are of short duration, typically 6–8 milliseconds. However, pain intensity can be increased by using the same milliamps for each shock while delivering more shocks per second:

"Many e−collars appear to shift intensity levels by altering the pulse duration or repetition rate while keeping the output current and voltage relatively constant, depending on the electrode−skin load."

The pain level can also be increased by delivering a continuous series of shocks (up to 30 seconds).

== Potential to cause physical harm ==
Pain experienced from shock collars is not from the electricity passing through the dog's body and reaching the ground (which would cause physical damage), but instead a result of electricity passing through a dog's body via closely-spaced electrodes (which should only cause pain). This pain is most clearly "described as physiological pain because it is not associated with any tissue damage" and even though such pain can "justifiably be described as a painful and emotionally distressing event, any potential harm would be psychological rather than physical", and therefore, burns are not likely to occur.

Burns from shock collars are not unheard of, however. In 1980 (revised 1987), the US Center for Veterinary Medicine (CVM), a branch of the U.S. Food and Drug Administration (FDA), concurred in regulatory action against a manufacturer of a bark collar, stating "Complaints received, which were later corroborated by our own testing, included severe burns in the collar area and possible personality adjustment injuries to the dogs. The shocking mechanism was found to be activated not only by barking but by vehicle horns, slamming doors or any other loud noise. CVM concurred in regulatory action against the device since it was deemed to be dangerous to the health of the animal." The standing policy of the US FDA is that "Dog collars which are activated by the noise of barking to produce an electric shock are considered as hazardous to the health of the animal."

== Training effectiveness ==
Training effectiveness refers to how reliably a method produces desired behavior while minimizing unintended side effects such as stress, fear, or behavioral fallout.

Multiple peer-reviewed studies comparing electronic shock collars with reward-based training methods have found that dogs trained using aversive stimuli show no superior learning outcomes and often exhibit elevated stress indicators, including increased cortisol levels, avoidance behaviors, and signs of anxiety. In controlled trials, dogs trained with positive reinforcement have demonstrated equal or higher compliance rates and better long-term retention of trained behaviors.

A 2014 study conducted at the University of Lincoln compared dogs trained using electronic collars, dogs trained with non-aversive methods, and a control group. The researchers found no significant improvement in obedience performance in the electronic collar group, while dogs exposed to shocks displayed more stress-related behaviors during training sessions. Similar findings have been reported in subsequent studies examining learning speed, behavioral reliability, and emotional well-being.

Professional veterinary and animal behavior organizations generally conclude that reward-based training methods are more effective and present fewer welfare risks. These organizations note that aversive training techniques may suppress behavior temporarily without addressing underlying motivations, potentially increasing the risk of fear-based aggression or learned helplessness.

While proponents argue that electronic collars can be effective when used at low stimulation levels by experienced trainers, empirical evidence does not consistently support superior outcomes compared to positive reinforcement approaches. As a result, many training guidelines emphasize reward-based methods as the preferred standard for both effectiveness and animal welfare.

== Deterring predation in the wild ==
The Wildlife Society article addresses the use of shock collars as a way to prevent sheep from being preyed upon by wild coyotes. The collars were tested on coyotes for a four-month period and found that the collars stopped thirteen attacks on sheep herds. This also is said to deter future attacks by the tested coyotes. Collars have also been used on wolves for similar reasons. This document is the assessment of the shock collar on wolves' long-term behavior. The article talks about trying to alter wolves' behavior over an extended period of time using the collar. The consensus was while it did have an effect while in use and temporally after it was removed, the study concluded that longer exposure would be needed to have any substantial evidence. As far as non-lethal alternatives these two sources both concluded that shock collars are the most effective deterrence to predators. Both groups continued their research and the Wildlife Society has developed a new and improved version that eliminates the risk of neck injury when used on animals that previous versions caused. They have increased battery life and the durability of the unit. They devised a unit that is worn like a backpack for the animal. Previous versions caused excessive rubbing and soreness as well as being irritating for the animal to the point where they would try to take the harness off.

== Criticism ==
Even in countries where shock collars are legal, their use is controversial, with differing positions among animal welfare organizations, veterinary associations, professional trainers, and policymakers.

=== Positions of veterinary associations ===
The AVSAB (American Veterinary Society of Animal Behavior) has strengthened their position statement on all aversive methods, including shock collars, which now states "The application of aversive methods – which, by definition, rely on application of force, pain, or emotional or physical discomfort – should not be used in canine training or for the treatment of behavioral disorders."

=== Positions of animal welfare organizations ===
On the advice of the RSPCA (Royal Society for the Prevention of Cruelty to Animals) and other welfare groups, the ACPO (Association of Chief Police Officers) banned the use of shock collars for police dog training by all UK police forces. The current ACPO Police Dogs Manual of Guidance states "Equipment that is not approved for use in the training of police dogs includes remote training collars designed to give an electric shock and Pinch Collars".

The RSPCA removed a policy statement discouraging the use of shock collars in 2018 due to a UK Government statement that they would be banned. In June 2023 the Animal Welfare (Electronic Collars) (England) Regulations 2023 were approved by the Lords but a delay in implementation leading to the BVNA alongside other charities such as the RSPCA launching a campaign to support the proposed ban.

PETA (People for the Ethical Treatment of Animals) opposes the use of shock collars, stating "Shock collars can cause dogs physical pain and injury (ranging from burns to cardiac fibrillation) and psychological stress, including severe anxiety and displaced aggression. Individual animals vary in their temperaments and pain thresholds; a shock that seems mild to one dog may be severe to another. The anxiety and confusion caused by repeated shocks can lead to changes in the heart and respiration rate or gastrointestinal disorders. Electronic collars can also malfunction, either administering nonstop shocks or delivering no shocks at all".

=== Views of proponents and training practitioners ===
Some professional trainers and manufacturers argue for the collars, saying that they are humane and effective when applied correctly, emphasizing low stimulation levels, careful timing, and trainer expertise.

=== Scientific findings on welfare effects ===
Several reviews and controlled studies have examined the welfare effects of aversive-based training methods, including remote electronic collars.

A 2020 controlled study comparing training with and without electronic collars reported that dogs trained with reward-based methods achieved similar or better training outcomes without the use of aversive stimuli.

A 2017 systematic review concluded that aversive training methods are associated with increased stress-related behaviors and poorer welfare outcomes compared with reward-based approaches.

Experimental studies have also reported that dogs trained using aversive-based methods show elevated stress indicators and less reliable generalization of learned behaviors compared with dogs trained using positive reinforcement.

=== Legislation and policy ===
The UK Kennel Club welcomed the proposed legislation to achieve a ban on the sale and use of shock collars in England. Their campaign had stated that "The Kennel Club is against the use of any negative training methods or devices. The Kennel Club believes that there are many positive training tools and methods that can produce dogs that are trained just as quickly and reliably, with absolutely no fear, pain, or potential damage to the relationship between dog and handler." "The Kennel Club in calling upon the Government and Scottish Parliament to introduce an outright ban on this barbaric method of training dogs.".

The two British members of the World Union of German Shepherd Clubs (WUSV) helped the Kennel Club win a complete ban on shock collars. They passed a motion to exclude this equipment from any of its training branches during official club training times.

== Legal status ==
=== Availability by region ===
Legality of shock collars by country
Country	Region	Status	Date banned	Notes	Ref.
Australia	Australian Capital Territory	Banned			
Australia	New South Wales	Banned			
Australia	South Australia	Banned			
Austria		Banned			
Belgium	Flanders	Banned	1 January 2027		
Canada	Quebec	Banned	2014		
Denmark		Banned			
Finland		Banned			
France		Banned			
Germany		Banned			
Iceland		Banned	2011		
Netherlands		Banned	1 July 2020	Its use is subject to €20,000 fine and three-year prison sentence.	
Norway		Banned			
Slovenia		Banned			
Spain		Banned	2022		
Sweden		Banned			
Switzerland		Partially banned		Automatic anti-barking shock collars are banned.	
United Kingdom	England	Not banned		Legislation to ban e-collars has been drafted, but as of October 2025 its passage into law is indefinitely delayed.	
United Kingdom	Wales	Banned			

Jurisdictions permitting regulated use
Jurisdiction	Regulatory approach	Oversight	Ref.
United States	Permitted with state variation	Animal welfare and cruelty statutes	
Switzerland	Conditional permission	Veterinary and training regulations	
United Kingdom (England)	Under legislative review	Draft legislation pending	

=== Legal cases involving shock collars ===
In 2001, British magistrates found that the aggressive behaviors of three dogs were due to the effects of shock collars. The initial incident occurred when the dogs, startled by a small dog, caused their owner to jump, inadvertently triggering the shock collars. This led to the dogs associating small dogs with receiving shocks, resulting in fear and aggression towards them. Over time, this escalated, leading to the dogs attacking and killing a small dog.

In 2002, the Royal Society for the Prevention of Cruelty to Animals (RSPCA) in Victoria, Australia lost a defamation lawsuit to a shock collar manufacturer and was ordered to pay AUD100,000 in damages. The RSPCA was found to have falsely claimed that shock collars can cause burns, deliver 3,000 volt shocks to dogs, and that the current from a shock collar had caused a 60 kilogram dog to perform backflips and resulted in brain damage. RSPCA's claims that these collars caused epileptic fits, vomiting, seizures, burning and bleeding was also found to be misleading. The RSPCA's senior inspector had falsified evidence in an attempt to demonstrate that shock collars can cause burns.

In 2010, the High Court in Wales upheld a ban on the use of shock collars for cats and dogs. It was unsuccessfully challenged by Petsafe, a manufacturer of these devices, and the Electronic Collar Manufacturers' Association. The court upheld the law and ruled that it did not breach Article 1 of the First Protocol of the European Convention of Human Rights (concerning the right to property).

In 2011, a Welsh man became the first person convicted of illegal use of a shock collar in Wales, receiving a fine for £2,000.

In 2022, a class action suit was filed in California for "a variety of brands" falsely marketing shock collars as "safe" and "harmless" tools, as well as "conceal(ing) the true nature of the Shock Collar Products" by using "neutral euphemisms to describe what being electrocuted by a shock collar feels like for a pet. Among the most popular terms that it uses to falsely describe a painful electric shock are 'static correction,' 'surprise,' 'tickle,' and 'stimulation.' The case was settled on February 5, 2025.

== See also ==
- Cattle prod – Device used to make cattle or livestock move
- Electroshock weapon – Incapacitating less-lethal weapon
- Graduated Electronic Decelerator – Electrical torture device
- Stun gun – Incapacitating less-lethal weapon
