= Roger Abrantes =

Portuguese author

Roger Abrantes (born 1951 in Portugal) is a Portuguese author on the behaviors of animals, with a PhD in evolutionary biology and ethology, and a Bachelor of Arts in philosophy. He is the divisional director at the Ethology Institute Cambridge where he holds regular lectures.

== Publications ==
- Dog Language: An Encyclopedia of Canine Behavior (1997) ISBN 978-0966048407
- Dogs Home Alone (1999) ISBN 978-0966048421
- The Evolution of Canine Social Behavior (2003) ISBN 978-0966048414
- Dog Behavior A-Z (2005) ISBN 978-3440093559
