= List of dog trainers =

This is a list of notable dog trainers.

- Francis Butler was a veterinarian and author who specialised in the training and control of dogs in the 1800s.
- Anne Rogers Clark, co-author of The International Encyclopedia of Dogs and first woman to win best in show at Westminster as a professional handler
- Ian Dunbar, a veterinarian, dog trainer, and writer
- Chuck Eisenmann, former professional baseball player, owner and trainer of the dogs on The Littlest Hobo
- Tamar Geller, developer of "the Loved Dog" method of dog training
- Frank Inn, professional animal trainer who worked with the dogs in the Benji series
- Bonnie Judd, professional animal trainer who worked with the dogs on Air Bud: World Pup, Good Boy!, and A Dog's Journey.
- Brian Kilcommons, author of pet training manuals and winner of Dr. Steve Kritsick Memorial Award from the New York State Veterinary Medical Society
- Patricia McConnell, author and former adjunct Professor of Zoology at the University of Wisconsin-Madison
- Pat Miller, book author and training editor at Whole Dog Journal
- Karen Pryor, founder of clicker training
- Mary Ray, creator of the dog sport Heelwork to Music.
- Blanche Saunders was famous for her 10,000 mile tour across USA to demonstrate dog obedience and training. She published several books on dog training.
- Graeme Sims, author of The Dog Whisperer
- Bernard Waters, dog trainer and author about sporting dogs
- Barbara Woodhouse was a dog breeder and trainer in England, known for her philosophy "There are no bad dogs, just inexperienced owners." She authored several books on dog training, and hosted a 1980s BBC TV series about training your own dog.
- Sophia Yin, veterinarian, applied animal behaviorist, author and lecturer

== Celebrity, performing and media-based dog trainers ==
- Steve Austin, judge on the Network Ten series Celebrity Dog School
- Harrison Forbes, radio show host and author of Dog Talk
- John Garcia, star of National Geographic Channel's DogTown series, trainer for Best Friends Animal Society
- Graeme Hall star of Dogs Behaving (Very) Badly on Channel 5
- Brandon McMillan (animal trainer) Animal Trainer and Behaviorist, Service Dog Trainer, former host of the Emmy winning series Lucky Dog on CBS
- Cesar Millan, Dog Behaviourist and Celebrity Dog Trainer, star on the National Geographic Channel series Dog Whisperer
- Joel Silverman, Hollywood dog trainer, author and star of Animal Planet's GOOD DOG U; star of WHAT COLOR IS YOUR DOG?
- Victoria Stilwell, host of Channel 4 series It's Me or the Dog and judge on the CBS show Greatest American Dog
- Kyra Sundance, stunt dog performer and author of the book 101 Dog Tricks
- Nick White, dog trainer and author
- Sherry Woodard, star of National Geographic Channel's DogTown series, certified dog trainer and animal behaviorist

== See also ==
- Dog behaviourist
- Dog training
