= Nick White =

Nick White may refer to:

- Nick White (musician), musician with Tilly and the Wall
- Nick White (dog trainer), celebrity dog trainer
- Nic White, Australian rugby union player
- Nick White (rugby union), New Zealand rugby union player
- Nick White (politician), American politician
- Nick White (racing driver), American stock car racing driver

== See also ==
- Nicholas White (disambiguation)
