= Bad Rap =

Bad Rap may refer to:

- BAD RAP (organization), an animal welfare and rescue group based on Oakland, California
- Bad Rap (film), a 2016 American documentary featuring Asian American rappers
- Bad Rap, a Hardy Boys novel
- "Bad Rap", an episode from Super Mario World
