= Henry E. Hudson =

American judge (born 1947)

Henry Hudson
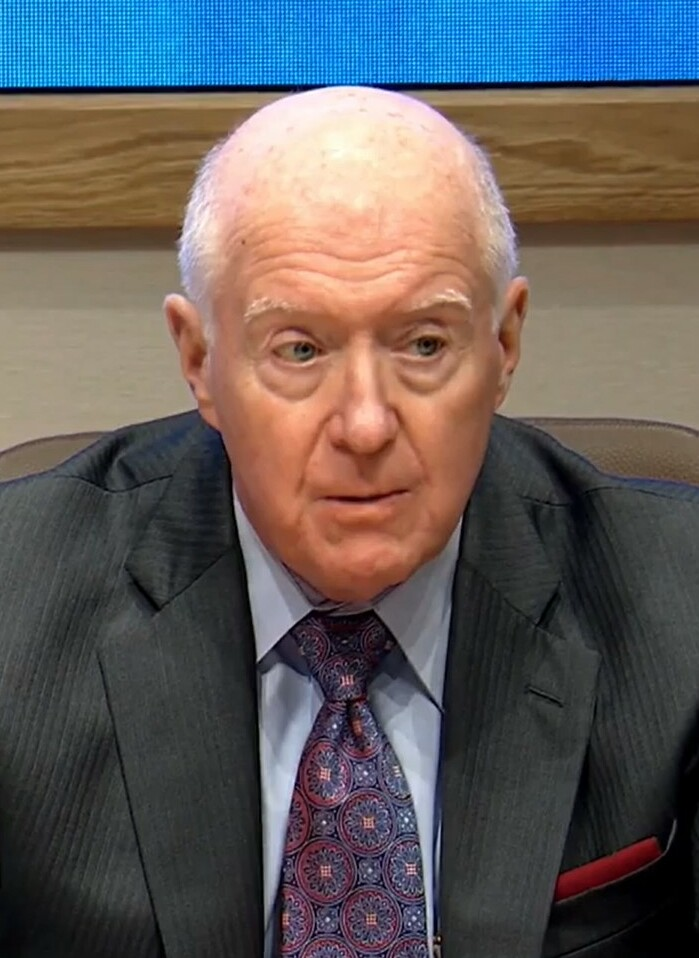
- Hudson in 2019

Senior Judge of the United States District Court for the Eastern District of Virginia
- Incumbent
- Assumed office June 1, 2018

Judge of the United States District Court for the Eastern District of Virginia
- In office August 2, 2002 – June 1, 2018
- Appointed by: George W. Bush
- Preceded by: Office established
- Succeeded by: David J. Novak

5th Director of the United States Marshals Service
- In office August 12, 1992 – October 17, 1993; Acting: February 24, 1992 – August 12, 1992
- President: George H. W. Bush
- Preceded by: K. Michael Moore
- Succeeded by: John J. Twomey, Jr. (acting)

Judge of the Nineteenth Judicial Circuit Court of Virginia
- In office 1998–2002

United States Attorney for the Eastern District of Virginia
- In office 1986–1991
- President: Ronald Reagan; George H. W. Bush
- Preceded by: Justin W. Williams (acting)
- Succeeded by: Kenneth E. Melson (acting)

Commonwealth Attorney of Arlington County, Virginia
- In office 1980–1986

Personal details
- Born: Henry Edward Hudson; July 24, 1947 (age 79) Washington, D.C., U.S.
- Spouse: Tara K. Lydon
- Education: American University (BA, JD)

Military service
- Allegiance: United States
- Branch/service: United States Marine Corps
- Years of service: 1970
- Rank: Private

Henry Edward Hudson (born July 24, 1947) is a senior United States district judge of the United States District Court for the Eastern District of Virginia.

== Early life and education ==
Born in Washington, D.C., Hudson was raised in Arlington, Virginia. At the age of 18, he served as a volunteer firefighter and paramedic in Arlington, Virginia. In 1969, Hudson received a Bachelor of Arts degree from American University. After college, he became a deputy sheriff for Arlington County, spending much of his time as a courtroom deputy. In 1974, he received a Juris Doctor from American University Washington College of Law.

== Legal career ==
Hudson's legal career had its roots in Republican Party politics. He became Assistant Commonwealth's Attorney in Arlington County, Virginia from 1974 to 1979, and subsequently served as Assistant United States Attorney for the Eastern District of Virginia from 1978 to 1979. He was in private practice with multiple different law firms from 1991 to 1992, 1994 to 1996, and from 1996 to 1998. From 1995 to 1997 he was a broadcaster for WWRC AM 980 and from 1997 to 1998 he served as the president of the Heritage Bank in McLean, Virginia. After a year in private practice, Hudson was elected Commonwealth's Attorney for Arlington County in 1980 as a Republican, and served until 1986.

During his career as a prosecutor, Hudson earned a reputation as a "hard-line and zealous crime fighter" nicknamed "Hang 'Em High Henry". Early in his career, Hudson stated: "I live to put people in jail." In what Hudson described as a "career-defining case", he prosecuted David Vazquez, an intellectually disabled Arlington resident, for a 1984 rape and murder. Hudson's prosecution was based on a confession given by Vazquez after repeated interrogations, despite the fact that semen found at the crime scene did not match Vazquez. Threatened by Hudson with the death penalty, Vazquez submitted an Alford plea and was sentenced to 30 years in prison. However, inconsistencies in the case led detectives to continue to pursue leads, ultimately linking Timothy Wilson Spencer, a serial killer, to the murder. Vazquez, who had already served 5 years in prison, was exonerated by Hudson's successor. Faced with the evidence of wrongful conviction, Hudson wrote of Vazquez in his memoirs: "I certainly wish him the best, and regret what happened. However I offer no apologies."

Hudson was one of the lead prosecutors of the Lyndon LaRouche criminal trials in the mid-1980s.

=== Pornography Commission ===
As Commonwealth Attorney, Hudson led a campaign to rid Arlington County of adult bookstores, massage parlors, and other venues linked to the sale of pornography. As a result of his efforts, he was named by the Reagan Administration to lead the Attorney General's Commission on Pornography (the so-called Meese Commission). The Commission controversially claimed that pornography caused sex crimes, despite the contention to the contrary of social scientists. Hudson said at the time that he wished the commission had taken an even stronger stand against pornography.

After his service on the Meese Commission, Hudson was rewarded with an appointment as United States Attorney for the Eastern District of Virginia. He remained in this position until 1991, during which time he investigated drug allegations against U.S. Senator Charles Robb. In 1991, Hudson ran briefly and unsuccessfully for Congress as a Republican against James P. Moran.

=== Marshal Service and Ruby Ridge ===
Under President George H. W. Bush, Hudson was Director of the United States Marshals Service, a division of the United States Department of Justice, from 1992 to 1993. According to an ESPN article, "His leadership of the Marshals Service included early decisions in the attempt to arrest Randy Weaver at Ruby Ridge, the greatest disaster in the history of federal law enforcement, a fiasco that led to a grand jury investigation (Hudson was called to testify) and misconduct charges against 12 federal agents." According to a Congressional report on the Ruby Ridge incident, "based on his desire to avoid creating discoverable documents that might be used by the defense in the Weaver/Harris trial and his understanding that the FBI would conduct a comprehensive investigation of the incident, [Hudson] decided to conduct no formal internal review of USMS activities connected with the Weaver case and the Ruby Ridge incident."

=== State court judge ===
Hudson was a circuit court judge on Virginia's Nineteenth Judicial Circuit Court (Fairfax County, Virginia) from 1998 to 2002.

Former Republican U.S. Congressman Thomas M. Davis, who first met Hudson in 1979 when Davis was running for the county board and Hudson was running for prosecutor, called Hudson a "by-the-book guy," adding that "[h]e is not one who coddles criminals." Davis also gave the following assessment of Hudson's personality and judgment:

He is a bulldog. He is not a warm puppy. Whatever Henry does, he will be criticized. But I know that what he does will be the right result. He will have the right answer.

=== Federal judicial service ===
On January 23, 2002, President George W. Bush nominated Hudson to a new seat on the United States District Court for the Eastern District of Virginia created by 114 Stat. 2762. The United States Senate confirmed the nomination on August 1, 2002, and Hudson received his commission on August 2, 2002. He was sworn in by Supreme Court Associate Justice Antonin Scalia. He assumed senior status on June 1, 2018.

==== Michael Vick dog fighting trial ====
Hudson was the presiding judge for the trial of Michael Vick regarding an illegal interstate dog fighting ring that had operated over five years. On December 10, 2007, Vick was sentenced by Hudson to 23 months in prison.

In December 2010, Hudson said that he was proud to see what Vick has accomplished and he told the Washington Post, "He's an example of how the system can work".

==== Patient Protection and Affordable Care Act ====
In December 2010, Hudson ruled against an element of the Obama administration's health care reform law, saying that the individual mandate provision of the law exceeded Congress' powers under the Commerce Clause of the Constitution. Hudson's opinion stressed the unprecedented nature of the mandate:

Neither the Supreme Court nor any federal circuit court of appeals has extended Commerce Clause powers to compel an individual to involuntarily enter the stream of commerce by purchasing a commodity in the private market ... At its core, the dispute is not simply about regulating the business of insurance—or crafting a scheme of universal health insurance coverage—it's about an individual's right to choose to participate.

Hudson was the first judge to rule against the healthcare law passed during the Obama administration. He was later reversed by the United States Court of Appeals for the Fourth Circuit.

=== Intent to nominate to the United States Sentencing Commission ===
On March 1, 2018, President Donald Trump nominated Hudson to serve as Commissioner of the United States Sentencing Commission, a seven-member independent body that sets federal sentencing guidelines. Hudson's nomination was sent to the United States Senate. On January 3, 2019, his nomination was returned to the President under Rule XXXI, Paragraph 6 of the United States Senate. On August 12, 2020, President Donald Trump announced his intent to renominate Hudson to serve as a Commissioner of the United States Sentencing Commission.

== Other ==
Hudson is the author of the 2007 book Quest for Justice: From Deputy Sheriff to Federal Judge ... and the Lessons Learned Along the Way (Loft Press, Fort Valley, Virginia).

Hudson is a shareholder of Campaign Solutions, Inc., a Republican consulting firm. For 2008, Hudson reported income of between $5,000 and $15,000 from the firm. In December 2010 the company released a statement that "Judge Hudson has owned stock in Campaign Solutions going back 13 years to the founding of the company or well before he became a federal judge. Since joining the federal bench, he has fully disclosed his stock ownership in the company. He is a passive investor only, has no knowledge of the day to day operations of the firm, and has never discussed any aspect of the business with any official of the company."

== Sources ==
- Opinion ruling the individual mandate unconstitutional
- Meese Report Statement of Henry E. Hudson, Chairman
- Judge with GOP Ties Strikes Down Key Healthcare Provision on Insurance Mandates - video report by Democracy Now!
- Freedom Watch interview with Ken Cuccinelli reacting to Judge Hudson's ruling, Fox Business Network

Legal offices
Preceded by Seat established by 114 Stat. 2762	Judge of the United States District Court for the Eastern District of Virginia; 2002–2018	Succeeded by David J. Novak
