= Nicholas White =

Nicholas White may refer to:

- Nicholas White (lawyer) (c. 1532–1592), Irish lawyer, judge, privy councillor and government official
- Nicholas White (martyr) (died 1557), English Protestant martyr
- Nicholas White (physician) (1951–2026), British tropical medicine doctor
- Nicholas White (South African cyclist) (born 1974), South African cyclist
- Nicholas White (Australian cyclist) (born 1997), Australian cyclist
- Nic H White (born 1997), Gold Coast Rugby union player
- Nic White (born 1990), Australian rugby union player
- Nicholas White, man who was trapped in an elevator for 41 hours in 1999
- Nicholas White, creator and editor of the internet culture magazine The Daily Dot

== See also ==
- Nick White (disambiguation)
