= Ed Faron =

American dog breeder

- Born: Edward Anthony Faron; November 9, 1947 (age 78); Ohio, United States
- Occupation: Dog breeder
- Criminal charge: Dog fighting
- Criminal penalty: 6 months

Edward Anthony Faron (born November 9, 1947) is an American author and a breeder of pit bulls for dog fighting. He is generally regarded in the United States as the Godfather of dog fighting.

Ed Faron was born in Ohio and trained dogs after returning from serving in the Vietnam War in 1970. He started breeding pit bull dogs in 1987. In 1995 he co-authored the book The Complete Gamedog: A Guide to Breeding and Raising the American Pit Bull Terrier. In 1996 Ed Faron moved to Millers Creek, North Carolina to create Wildside Kennels.

In 2008 Ed Faron was indicted for a running a dog fighting operation called Wildside Kennels, which was based in Wilkes County, North Carolina. In 2009, he pleaded guilty to dog fighting and received a 10-month prison sentence plus probation time. Faron had previously been convicted for dog fighting in 1989. 127 pit bulls were seized in the 2008 raid, to be euthanized.
