= John Garcia (dog trainer) =

American dog trainer from Coconino County, Arizona

- Born: 1981 (age 44–45); Arizona
- Occupations: Dog trainer, Emergency responder
- Years active: 1998–present
- Employer: Best Friends Animal Society
- Known for: DogTown TV series
- Website: Official Website

John Garcia (born in Arizona in 1981) is a dog trainer, star of National Geographic Channel's four-season DogTown series, and holder of a Guinness World Record.

== Biography ==
Garcia began his career in animal welfare at age 18 when he began working as a caregiver at Best Friends Animal Society based in Kanab, Utah, the largest no-kill animal sanctuary in the U.S., located not far from where Garcia grew up in Fredonia, Arizona. He told Experience Life Magazine that the reason he went to work for Best Friends after high school and not onto college was to give back to animals because his best friend growing up was a dog.

In August 2005, he made news when he set a record, making the Guinness Book of World Records for walking 22 dogs at one time for one mile.

A month later, Hurricane Katrina hit the Gulf Coast and Garcia was deployed by Best Friends to the region as a caregiver of rescued animals, helping care for them at a triage center in Mississippi until May 2006 when all the animals were reunited or placed in foster homes.

Beginning in January 2008, Garcia helped care for and train 22 of the confiscated pit bull terriers from NFL star Michael Vick’s Bad Newz Kennels illegal dog-fighting operation. Garcia was featured in an article and in a photo on the front page of The New York Times with Georgia, one of the shyer Vick dogs, asleep with him on a cot.

He has appeared twice on The Ellen DeGeneres Show (once with Georgia) as well as on Larry King Live.

Garcia, when interviewed by USAToday about the canines referred to by Best Friends as the Vicktory Dogs, told a reporter he had spent a month at a holding area with the dogs before they were flown to the Best Friends sanctuary: "They are good dogs. We believe every dog deserves a second chance.”

Images of Garcia with Georgia have run across the Web and news outlets, from a Los Angeles Times blog to a story on Forbes.com’s Crime, She Writes column about Chicago's Court Case Dog Program. He was also featured in training photos included on Anderson Cooper’s CNN AC360 blog. A photo of Garcia with a dog appears on the cover of National Geographic Books' Dog Tips From DogTown: A Relationship Manual for You and Your Dog.

He was a trainer and co-manager of Best Friends’ Dogtown, where the canines live at the sanctuary, when National Geographic’s “DogTown” series began in January 2008 and ran for four seasons, in which Garcia starred.

In 2011, Garcia and his wife Mckanzie Garcia went to work for several months as trainers and rescuers for Stray Rescue in St. Louis, Missouri, but returned to Best Friends the same year, with John Garcia taking on a new position as emergency response manager.

== Personal life ==
He lives in Utah with his wife Mckenzie, also a dog trainer who works for Best Friends, and their son Jax.

== Sources ==
- Sweeney, Michael S. (2010). Dog Tips From DogTown: A Relationship Manual for You and Your Dog. National Geographic Books. ISBN 978-1-4262-0648-1..
- Scott, Cathy (2008). Pawprints of Katrina: Pets Saved and Lessons Learned. Howell Book House. ISBN 978-0-470-22851-7..
