= David Doherty (politician) =

American politician

Member of the New Hampshire House of Representatives from the Merrimack 20 district
- In office December 3, 2014 – December 2, 2020
- Succeeded by: Nick White

Personal details
- Party: Democratic
- Education: Merrimack College; Assumption College

David Doherty is a New Hampshire politician.

== Education ==
Doherty graduated from Sacred Heart High School in Waterbury, Connecticut. He earned a B.A. in political science from Merrimack College in 1967 and an M.A. in guidance and psychology from Assumption College in 1969.

== Career ==
Doherty previously worked as a guidance counselor, a position he retired from in 2008. He is a member of the Pembroke School Board, and has been since 2012. On November 4, 2014, Doherty was elected to the New Hampshire House of Representatives where he represents the Merrimack 20 district. He assumed office on December 3, 2014. He is a Democrat.

== Personal life ==
Doherty resides in Pembroke, New Hampshire. He is married and has three children.
