= Best Friends Animal Society =

U.S. nonprofit animal welfare organization

- Predecessor: Process Church of the Final Judgement
- Founded: 1991
- Founders: Francis Battista; Judah Battista; Silva Battista; Gregory Castle; Gabriel Depeyer; Jana Depeyer; Steven Hirano; Faith Maloney; Anne Mejia; Cyrus Mejia
- Tax ID no.: 23-7147797
- Legal status: 501(c)(3) nonprofit organization
- Purpose: Animal welfare
- Headquarters: Kane County, Utah (Kanab postal address)
- Location(s): Atlanta, Georgia; Bentonville, Arkansas; Houston, Texas; Los Angeles, California; New York City; Salt Lake City, Utah
- Coordinates: 37.125773°N 112.543697°W
- Origins: Foundation Faith of the Millennium; Process Church of the Final Judgment
- Chief Executive Officer: Julie Castle
- Chair, Board of Directors: Francis Battista
- Executive Director: Marc A. Peralta
- Subsidiaries: Best Friends Productions LLC, 1089 Wykoff LLC, 307 West Broadway LLC, Chuff LLC, Amber Housing LLC, Best Friends Wellness Center Inc
- Revenue: $87,144,293 (2016)
- Expenses: $81,852,232 (2016)
- Endowment: $19,383,509
- Employees: 838 (2015)
- Volunteers: 9,748 (2015)
- Website: bestfriends.org
- Formerly called: Best Friends Animal Sanctuary; Foundation Faith of the Millennium; Process Church of the Final Judgement

Best Friends Animal Society, (BFAS) is an American nonprofit 501(c)(3) animal welfare organization based 5 miles (8.0 km) north of Kanab, Utah, with satellite offices in Atlanta, Georgia, Bentonville, Arkansas, Houston, Texas, Los Angeles, California, New York City, and Salt Lake City, Utah. It also has a partnership network with shelters, rescue groups and members in all 50 states and Washington, DC, on pet adoption, no-kill animal rescue, and spay-and-neuter programs. Best Friends has a 4-star 'Give With Confidence' rating from Charity Navigator.

== History ==
The group originated in England in 1966 as the Process Church of the Final Judgment, co-founded by Mary Ann MacLean, who was married to the British occultist Robert de Grimston since 1964, and later to former church member and Best Friends Animal Society co-founder Gabriel Depeyer, and who lived on Best Friends' sanctuary grounds until her 2005 death.

The Foundation church moved from England to Florida in 1970, in 1978 to Arizona, from where it relocated animals to property in Kanab, Utah, in 1984. In 1991, the church was renamed Best Friends Animal Sanctuary, which became a tax-exempt, nonprofit charity, and in 2003, renamed Best Friends Animal Society.

In 2019, Best Friends Animal Society and Southern Utah University began a partnership that included a new certificate program at SUU that included coursework on how to set up and run a no-kill animal shelter.

== Utah animal sanctuary ==
After the Foundation church moved to its current grounds in 1984, the founders eventually informally called it "Best Friends" until 1991 when it began formally operating as Best Friends Animal Sanctuary, a no-kill shelter located in Southwestern Utah in Angel Canyon (formerly Kanab Canyon) near Kanab.

The sanctuary is on 3,700 acres (15 km^{2}) with an additional 33,000 acres (130 km^{2}) leased from the United States Bureau of Land Management near Zion National Park, the Grand Canyon's North Rim, Bryce Canyon National Park, and Lake Powell. The sanctuary houses around 1,500 animals.

The sanctuary is divided into animal specific areas, including Bunny House, Dogtown and Cat World. Animals that are unable to be placed in permanent homes and wild animals that cannot be released back into the wild can live out their lives at the sanctuary.

== Los Angeles adoption center ==
In 2011, the city of Los Angeles contracted Best Friends to operate in its Northeast Valley Shelter facility in Mission Hills, Los Angeles, which the city could no longer afford to run due to budget cuts. Under the contract, BFAS was to provide adoptions for shelter animals it obtained solely from LA Animal Service shelters, and to provide spay and neuter services for the community. The contract prohibited BFAS from obtaining animals from any other sources, such as public intake or transfers from other organizations.

Best Friends was the only bidder for the $19 million shelter contract. Other animal welfare organizations criticized the bidding process, saying they had not been notified, while the city officials said potential bidders had been contacted by letter and through the city's website. As of 2021, BFAS no longer operate the shelter.

== Magazine ==
BFAS publishes Best Friends, a bimonthly magazine about animals, animal welfare, news events, and activities at the sanctuary. The magazine, which is distributed free to members, has 200,000 subscribers. Originating as Foundation magazine in 1975 with its interview of Charles Manson referred to as the "death" issue, the first edition of Best Friends magazine was published in 1993, two years after the religious group became an animal sanctuary.

== Hurricane Katrina work ==
Best Friends teams entered the Hurricane Katrina disaster area on September 2, 2005, and stayed eight months in and around New Orleans.

The organization's post-Hurricane Katrina work included animal rescue organization overseen by then-Best Friends employee Sherry Woodard.

Also after Katrina, Best Friends helped Pets Alive, an animal shelter in New York state, and rescued around 800 cats from an institutional hoarding situation in Nevada. Best Friends also assisted local animal rescue groups following the Peruvian earthquakes of 2007.

== Michael Vick dogs ==
In 2007, after petitioning the state of Virginia to save the dogs seized from the Bad Newz Kennels dog fighting investigation, Best Friends took in 22 of the 47 fighting dogs of former NFL quarterback Michael Vick. The dogs were expected to be euthanized for fear of aggressive behavior. Seven other organizations took in the remaining 25 dogs. The court ordered Vick to pay $928,073 in restitution for the "past, present and long-term care of all the dogs." The court allocated $5,000 for dogs deemed likely to be adopted, and $18,275 for each of the dogs that went into longer-term or lifetime sanctuary care at Best Friends.

In December 2008, Georgia, a former Vick dog, appeared on The Ellen DeGeneres Show with Best Friends dog trainer John Garcia. The two also appeared on CNN's Larry King Live.

Released in October 2015, The Champions is a documentary that follows five dogs, their adopters, and public perceptions of pit bulls rescued from fighting cases. The film received the 2015 Zelda Penzel "Giving Voice to the Voiceless" award at Hamptons International Film Festival. The film also features the work of both Best Friends Animal Society and BAD RAP, an Oakland-based animal welfare rescue group. FilmRise acquired film rights in November 2015. It was released through community screenings and became available digitally in March 2016.

== Community cat programs ==
In August 2008, Best Friends and PetSmart Charities funded a program called "Feral Freedom" for free-roaming community cats in Jacksonville, Florida. The program was conceived by Rick Ducharme of First Coast No More Homeless Pets.

Similar programs were funded with a grant from PetSmart Charities and implemented by Best Friends in Albuquerque, New Mexico; DeKalb County, Georgia; San Antonio, Texas; Baltimore, Maryland; Osceola County, Florida; Philadelphia, Pennsylvania; and other communities. In St. George, Utah, the city partnered with Best Friends on a trap-neuter-return program in January 2013.

== See also ==
- List of animal welfare organizations
