= Musical canine freestyle =

Dog sport

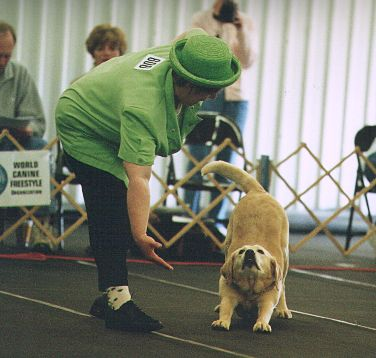
- A dog and handler perform in a musical freestyle competition

Musical canine freestyle, also known as musical freestyle, freestyle dance, and canine freestyle, is a modern dog sport that is a mixture of obedience training, tricks, and dance that allows for creative interaction between dogs and their owners. The sport has developed into competition forms in several countries around the world.

== History ==
Musical freestyle started in many places almost simultaneously around 1989, with demonstrations of the talent of heeling to music being shown in Canada, England, the United States, and the Netherlands within three years of each other. The main unifying element among the groups was an interest in more creative obedience demonstrations and dog training, a love of music, and, in many cases, inspiration from an equine sport called musical kur, which was a more creative and dynamic form of dressage.

The first official musical freestyle group, Musical Canine Sports International, was founded in British Columbia, Canada, in 1991. Soon, other groups followed in the United States and England. Each region began developing its own style, with many American groups promoting more trick-based routines and costumes. English groups focused more on heel work and on the dog, and less on costumes and design. Musical freestyle has become more common in animal talent shows and specialty acts.

== Techniques ==
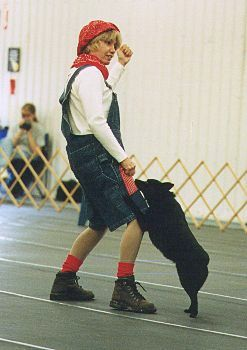
World Canine Freestyle Organization events offer divisions for 'Heelwork to music' and 'Musical freestyle'.

Teaching a dog to be able to work on both sides of the handler's body, not just the left side as in standard obedience heeling, is the first step to doing freestyle. The trainer first breaks the routine into pieces with only two or three moves linked together, and as they progress these pieces are linked together.

There are two types of musical canine freestyle, freestyle heeling (also known as heelwork to music) and musical freestyle.

=== Heelwork to music ===
Heelwork to music focuses on a dog's ability to stay in variations of the heel position while the handler moves to music. In heel work to music, the dog and trainer remain close to each other at all times. Sending the dog away or doing distance work is not part of the routine, with the dog remaining almost invisibly tethered to the trainer. Pivots, and moving diagonally, backwards, and forwards to a suitable musical theme are important to the routine. Jumping, weaving, rolling, passing through the trainer's legs and anything else considered "not heeling" is not allowed.

=== Musical freestyle ===
Musical freestyle demands that the dog perform a variety of tricks and other obedience talents. In musical freestyle, heel work can be combined with other moves such as leg weaving, sending the dog away, moving together at a distance, and more dramatic tricks such as jumping, spinning, bowing, rolling over. Dancing in place, and other innovative actions where the dog plays off the dance moves of the trainer are encouraged. A popular finishing trick for some routines is for the dog to jump into the trainer's arms, or over his or her back.

== Competition ==
Currently, there are several organizations regulating competitive freestyle, such as Rally Freestyle Elements, the World Canine Freestyle Organization, Canine Freestyle Federation, Dogs Can Dance and the Musical Dog Sport Association in the United States, Paws 2 Dance Canine Freestyle Organization in Canada, Canine Freestyle GB in Great Britain, and Pawfect K9 Freestyle Club in Japan. In the UK, the sport is called Heelwork to Music and is an officially recognized sport of the Kennel club.

Competition rules vary from group to group, and from country to country, but most are based on a variety of technical and artistic merit points. All routines are done free of training aids or leashes, except in some beginner categories. Competition can be done as a single dog-and-handler team, as a pair of dogs and handlers, or as a full team of three or more dogs and their handlers. Generally, there is only one dog per handler for competition.

In either type of competition, the choice of music and the way the routine reflects the music is important. Routines not following the rhythm, no matter how well executed, do not score well.

Exhibition freestyle is a no-holds-barred routine designed to demonstrate the full extent of creativity and excitement that musical freestyle can offer. Though highly entertaining and representing what most people see on television or at events, it allows for moves, props, cues, and costumes that would not usually be allowed on the competition circuit.

Rally Freestyle Elements (Rally FrEE) combines the trick behaviors of Canine Musical Freestyle with the format of Rally-Obedience.
