= Heelwork to music =

Dog sport

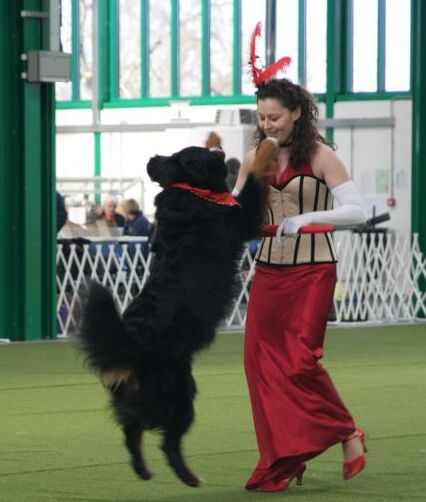
- A dog and owner at a heelwork to music competition

Heelwork to music is a dog sport similar to musical canine freestyle.

== United Kingdom ==
The sport is officially recognised by the Kennel Club. The sport has evolved since the early 1990s when obedience handler Mary Ray first demonstrated the sport at Crufts. Rugby Dog Club held the first show in 1996 and this show has continued to be the highlight of the sporting year.

2005 saw the first invitational competition at Crufts, and was won by Tina Humphrey and her blue merle Border Collie, Bluecroft My Blue Heaven 2006 saw the first proper Crufts competition. Rugby Dog Training Club now host the official Crufts SemiFinal Competition where advanced handlers who have competed at qualifying events throughout the year compete for the first ten places and the chance to work at Crufts. The sport has two divisions - Heelwork to Music where handlers have to work with dogs at heel for two thirds of the routine and only one third can be heelwork. There are eight official heelwork positions. Heelwork routines emphasis the partnership of handler and dog walking/moving at heel and choreographing the heelwork to the music. The other category is Freestyle where two thirds of a routine is freestyle and only one third can be heelwork. Freestyle routines demonstrates the partnership by both handler and dog interpreting music using moves and linked behaviours. Canine Freestyle GB and Paws N Music Association are the two main Heelwork to Music clubs - both hold several shows throughout the year and provide newsletters for members.

Crufts 2009 saw Tina Humphrey and her rescued Border Collie, Bluecroft My Blue Heaven (Chandi), win all three Heelwork to Music and Freestyle Finals in the same year. This is the first time the same team has won both the Freestyle Final and Heelwork to Music Final at the same Crufts, and also the first time the same team has won all three competitions.

The UK Kennel Club in 2005 put together a working party to review the sport's rules and regulations. That working party brought together several high profile competitors, judges, and show managers to review the sport. This culminated in the revised rules coming into force on the 1.1.2007, which now includes the ability to work towards qualification after the dogs name.

== World ==
In June 2010, at the FCI World Dog Show in Herning, Denmark, the first FCI World Championships in Heelwork To Music and Freestyle were held. Team Denmark (Emmy Marie Simonsen with Border Collie Bridacre Wisp, Anja Christiansen with Border Collie Fæhunden's Queeny Lass and Helle Larssen with Border Collie Littlethorn Avensis) were the Team Winners of the Heelwork To Music Competition and Team Czech Republic (Vanda Gregorova with Australian Shepherd All That Brandy Gentle Mate, Alena Smolikova with Border Collie Dapper Dame Black Chevers and Lucie Smolikova with Border Collie A White Head Tender Flash) were the Team Winners of the Freestyle Competition. In the individual Championships, the first FCI Heelwork To Music Champions of the World were Kath Hardman with her 5 year old Border Collie Stillmoor Lady in Red and the first FCI Freestyle Champions of the World were Thierry Thomas with his Border Collie Ubac. The three judges were Head Judge Karen Sykes (England), Marleen van Hees (Belgium) and Carina Enevoldsen (Denmark).
