= Dog fighting in the United States =

Bloods gang members dog-fighting in a vacant office building

Dog fighting in the United States is an activity in which fights between two game dogs are staged as a form of entertainment and gambling. Such activity has existed since the early 19th century in the United States and was gradually prohibited in all states. It continues as an underground activity in both rural and urban locations.

In the late 20th century, police and animal control law enforcement task forces, primarily of local and state authorities, were formed in many parts of the country to combat dog fighting rings, which constituted serious animal welfare violations and had links to organized crime and social problems. In 2007, the U.S. Congress passed a federal law against interstate dog-fighting activities, providing for felony-level penalties including multi-year prison sentences and large fines for each offense; passage of this law was followed by the involvement of Special Agents of the Office the Inspector General of the U.S. Department of Agriculture in ongoing investigations around the country.

In April 2007, the illegal activity received widespread attention after evidence surfaced suggesting professional football player Michael Vick had a dog-fighting ring operating on his property. The case resulted in guilty pleas by several individuals and to a single felony count for Vick, who received a 21-month federal sentence.

In 2009, Ed Faron was sentenced for six months for running the largest-known dog-fighting ring in the United States, called Wildside Kennels.

== History ==
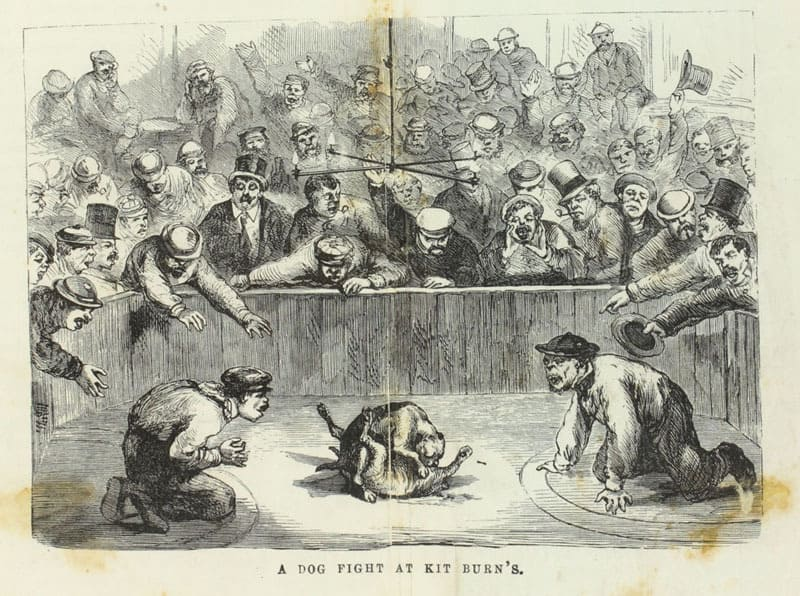
“A Dog Fight at Kit Burns' ”, 1868.

According to a study by the Michigan State University College of Law published in 2005, in the United States, dog fighting was once completely legal and was sanctioned and promoted during the colonial period (17th century through 1776) and continuing through the Victorian era in the late 19th century. The early 19th century saw the development in England of the Bull-and-Terrier, first imported into the United States ca. 1817, becoming the foundation stock of the later American Pit Bull Terrier. Organized dog fighting became a part of American culture, and was promoted by the United Kennel Club. As the activity grew in popularity, so too did opposition to it. By the early 20th century, the United Kennel Club dropped its support and by the 1960s most states had made it illegal. It was not until 1976 that it was outlawed in all states and even then, enforcement was generally lax.

By the late 20th century, as dog fighting became more popular in the poor areas of major U.S. cities, research and investigations revealed strong links with connected with street gangs and social ills, enforcement efforts increased.

Despite legality issues, dogs are still commonly used for fighting purposes all across the continent. The American Pit Bull Terrier is the most popular breed used for fighting, but foreign breeds, such as the Dogo Argentino (used widely in South America), and to a lesser extent, the Presa Canario are also gaining popularity. In Miami-Dade County, Florida, where the American Pit Bull Terrier, American Staffordshire Terrier, and the Staffordshire Bull Terrier (or any other dog that substantially conforms to any of these breeds' characteristics) was banned until 2023, the Dogo Argentino has become the main fighting dog of choice, being used at both organized and street level dogfighting.

== Impacts upon modern society ==
In the 21st century, dog fighting has become an objectionable and unlawful activity in most places broad categories, and each have motivated constituencies in many areas.

=== Animal welfare and rights ===
Dog fighting is often considered one of the most serious forms of animal abuse, not only for the violence that the dogs endure during and after the fights, but because they often suffer their entire lives. This is intentional, as many participants believe the rough treatment of the dogs will make them better, more aggressive fighters. This position and the resulting treatment afforded the dogs stand in stark contrast with prevailing public values regarding the treatment of dogs in many societies.

In addition to the controversial treatment a dog receives when he has potential as a fighter, according to a filing in U.S. District Court in Richmond by Federal investigators in Virginia, which was obtained under the Freedom of Information Act and published by The Baltimore Sun on July 6, 2007, a losing dog or one whose potential is considered unacceptable faces "being put to death by drowning, strangulation, hanging, gun shot, electrocution or some other method".

During the furor arising around the Bad Newz Kennels investigation in Virginia in 2007 and revelations of extreme brutality there, even such diverse notables as hip-hop mogul Russell Simmons and the Reverend Al Sharpton joined with People for the Ethical Treatment of Animals (PETA) and the Humane Society of the United States (HSUS) in calling for strong stands against animal cruelty, jointly stating:

Today, we sound a clarion call to all people: Stand up for what is right, and speak out against what is wrong. Dogfighting is unacceptable. Hurting animals for human pleasure or gain is despicable. Cruelty is just plain wrong.

=== Stolen pets: bait animals ===
In addition to the fate which awaits fighters, or even dogs likely to become fighters, "bait" animals are often used to test a dog's fighting instinct, with the use of "Adoption Wanted" or "Good Home Needed" posters to track their bait, which is used in the training for these "fighters". The bait is mauled or killed in the process. Often, bait animals are stolen pets, as officials with the Sheriff's Department in Pima County, Arizona say they were shocked to discover a few years ago, according to a story by National Geographic News. According to news reports compiled by the National Humane Society, the muzzles of bait dogs are wrapped with duct tape to prevent them from injuring dogs being trained for fighting. Some bait animals have been recovered with their teeth ground down to the gums to render them helpless against fighting dogs. Other animals, such as cats and rabbits, are also reported to be used as bait for fighting dogs. Experts have said small dogs, kittens, and rabbits are more at risk of being stolen for bait than larger animals.

National Geographic noted that there are no statistics on how many pets are taken and used as bait by dog fighting rings each year. Patricia Wagner, head of the National Illegal Animal Fighting Task Force for the Humane Society of the United States, offered the statement "I think every state has a problem with it, whether they know it or not."

=== Dangers of training dogs for fighting ===
After a life of training as a fighting dog, if a dog does not suffer its death while in such service, it is often euthanized. In Richmond, Virginia, when a dog fighter was sentenced in June 2007, it was revealed in court that over a dozen of his dogs had to be euthanized, either because of serious illness, injury or malnutrition, or because their training as fighting dogs made them too dangerous for adoption. Until 2006, the man had kept 16 pit bulls in the backyard of his house, confined with heavy chains used for automobile towing. Experts say chaining the animals is a dogfighting technique for building strength. When an animal control officer arrived in response to a complaint from a neighbor that one of the dogs had died, he found the dead dog in a trash can. The others had no food, no clean water, and no adequate shelter. Jody Jones, program manager of Richmond Animal Care and Control, said in court that the case produced more dogs euthanized than any other case she knows of from her 15-year career in animal control.

Following the seizure of a large number of dogs in an April 2007 dog fighting case in Mississippi, Tara High, executive director of the Humane Society of South Mississippi, said "[t]he reality is that they've been used for entertainment. It's quite tragic for those of us that are kind of left to deal with it and the reality that these animals aren't going to be able to be rehabilitated." High compared the animals to "a loaded weapon. And not something we feel very comfortable letting out into the community."

=== Societal impact, gang, and criminal activities ===
For many years, even after it was outlawed, dog fighting was considered an isolated animal welfare issue, and as such was ignored, denied, or disregarded by law enforcement agencies. However, it has now been established that the dog fighting culture is often intimately connected to other criminal activity, with dog fighters frequently involved in organized crime, racketeering, drug distribution, or gangs, and dog fighting events often facilitating gambling and drug trafficking.

According to the aforementioned Michigan State study,

Even seasoned law enforcement agents are consistently appalled by the atrocities that they encounter before, during, and after dog fights, yet the children in those communities are routinely exposed to the unfathomable violence that is inherent within the blood sport and become conditioned to believe that the violence is normal. Those children are systematically desensitized to the suffering, and ultimately become criminalized.

== Laws in U.S. ==
Dog fighting is unlawful in all 50 states and the District of Columbia, as well as Guam, Puerto Rico and the Virgin Islands. Before the Federal law was passed, New York already had issued felony penalties up to four years to individuals fighting any types of animals, but some other levels of participation were only misdemeanor offenses. The state of New York considers attending an animal fight to be merely a violation, which ultimately leads to a fine. States surrounding New York like New Jersey and Connecticut passed a bill, stated that attendance at an animal fight is indeed a felony charge. Due to a loophole it is legal in 49 out of 50 states to possess dogs for fighting. The Animal Fighting Spectator Prohibition Act closed the loophole that allowed people to knowingly attend dogfighting events.

In all states, it is against the law (and often a felony) even to attend a dog fighting event, regardless of direct participation. According to authorities, dog fighting is increasingly practiced by gangs, and is linked to other unlawful activities, such as illegal gambling. On February 7, 2014 President Obama signed the Farm Bill which contained the U.S. H.R. 366/S. 666—Animal Fighting Spectator Prohibition Act. "The final bill includes a provision making it a federal crime to attend or bring a child under the age of 16 to an animal fighting event[.]" "The Animal Fighting Spectator Prohibition Act would make it a federal offense to knowingly attend an organized animal fight and would impose additional penalties for bringing children to animal fights. Violators would face up to one year in prison for attending a fight, and up to three years in prison for bringing a minor to a fight."

=== Breed specific legislation ===
Even though it is illegal, dog fighting still occurs across the globe. To combat dog fighting and curb ownership of "dangerous dogs," Breed Specific Legislation (BSL) has been passed in some countries, as well as in some local and regional jurisdictions. However, opponents argue that BSL affects responsible pet owners more than those who keep dogs for fighting purposes.

=== New Federal law effective May 2007 ===
In May 2007, a new Federal law went into effect making interstate dog fighting activities felonious and providing for imprisonment and imposition of large fines. The Animal Fighting Prohibition Enforcement Act, a new Federal law sponsored by US Senators Arlen Specter (D-PA.), Dianne Feinstein (D-CA.), and John Ensign (R-NV.), was enacted by the U.S. Congress earlier in 2007 and signed by President George W. Bush on May 3, making organizing a dog fight a felony. The law provides a penalty of up to three years of imprisonment and up to a $250,000 fine for each offense of interstate or foreign transport of animals for fighting purposes. Using the provisions of the new law, which took effect immediately, the Office of the Inspector General (OIG) of the U.S. Department of Agriculture (USDA) is pursuing cases in a number of locations around the country with considerable support from humane societies and local police departments.

=== Widespread links to gangs, other criminal activities ===
The United States Humane Society estimates that more than 40,000 people across the country buy and sell fighting dogs and are involved in dogfighting activities. But authorities say those in dogfighting circles also are involved in a number of other crimes, including narcotics trafficking, illegal gambling and murder.

In August 2006, a suspected dog fighter in Texas bled to death after he was shot by intruders who apparently intended to torture him into revealing where he had hidden $100,000 wagered in a high-stakes dog match.

The Chicago Sun-Times reported that an analysis during a study by the College of Law at Michigan State University found that, in more than two dozen raids on dogfights, in virtually every instance police also seized illegal narcotics and weapons. Police seized $250,000 in cash during another 2004 raid in Covington, Georgia. "Law enforcement is realizing it's a real community problem, intertwined with other crimes such as drugs and gambling," John Goodwin, an official with the Humane Society stated in an interview for the Norfolk Virginian-Pilot newspaper published in June 2007.

Many communities in widespread areas across the United States are aggressively targeting dog fighting by coordinating local and regional dog fighting task forces. "It's clear that when you have dogfighting, drugs and gambling and other criminal subcultures follow," according to Mark Plowden, a spokesman for the South Carolina Attorney General's Office, which in 2004 created a dogfighting task force. In Chicago, Illinois, a special police unit is devoted to investigating cases of abuse due to the connection between dog fighting and other gang crimes. In 2005, the police in Los Angeles, California formed an Animal Cruelty Task Force, leading to prosecutions of gang members there for animal abuse.

=== Professional athletes, entertainers ===
Among those linked to dog fighting is Doug Atkins an NFL player who was an enthusiastic participator in dog fighting, and LeShon Johnson, a former NFL running back who received a five-year deferred sentence in 2005 after officials seized 200 dogs during a raid of his dog fighting operation that led to 20 people being convicted in Oklahoma. Former National Basketball Association forward Qyntel Woods, pleaded guilty to animal abuse in 2005 at his home in Portland, Oregon. Former Dallas Cowboys lineman Nate Newton was arrested at a dogfight in Texas, although charges were later dropped.

In the late 2000s, NFL quarterback Michael Vick was linked to property in southeastern Virginia where authorities believe a multi-state dog fighting operation was based. In an interview with WAVY-TV, Portsmouth, Virginia, Washington Redskins running back Clinton Portis and a teammate, offensive tackle Chris Samuels, defended Vick. Portis said that if Vick is charged and convicted of dog fighting, "then you're putting him behind bars for no reason. I don't know if he was fighting dogs or not, but it's his property. It's his dog. If that's what he wants to do, do it." Those comments were sharply criticized by NFL Commissioner Roger Goodell. The Redskins and Portis himself later apologized, stating that his controversial remarks about dog fighting were insensitive and that he now realizes he "shouldn't have made the comments." He added, "At that time I had no idea the love people have for animals, and I didn't consider it when I made those comments."

New York Animal Control Officer Kleinfelder says, "For pro athletes, it's not about the money ... Instead of boxers just beating up on each other, they want to see it go to the death, and with dogs they can let it go that far. To them, dogs are expendable."

Rhonda Evans is a sociologist and associate professor in the department of criminal justice at the University of Louisiana at Lafayette who has published four academic articles on dog fighting. She stated in a story published by the Palm Beach Post that she had found that owners of high-dollar fighting dogs spanned all walks of life and social classes, with a common link of "a machismo mentality." Evans said "For them, tough dogs are a symbol of manhood... and by winning, the dogs build up their owners' ego. They see it as a valid, legitimate sport that is no worse than boxing or football."

Rap and other similar music also seem to glorify dog fighting. Jay-Z shows dogs being prepared for a fight in the uncensored version of his music video, "99 Problems". A pit bull is on the cover of a CD by rapper DMX that is titled Grand Champ. "Grand Champ" is said to be a reference to a dog that has won five dogfights.

Madison Avenue advertising firms have capitalized on the same theme. When Nike was criticized about an ad featuring a growling pit bull and Rottweiler about to face off, the company denied the ad encourages dog fighting. The representative went on to state, however, "People have to understand the youth culture we cater to. Our market is the urban, edgy, hip-hop culture."

=== Athletes speak out against dog fighting ===
International Boxing Federation Champion Steve Cunningham: "Dogs are truly man's best friend. Yet some people take advantage of their loyalty by forcing them into dog fighting. It's disgusting and a heinous thing to do. It must be stopped. So join me in Knocking Out Dog Fighting."

Mixed Martial Arts Champion Tito Ortiz: "Animal abuse happens every day in the form of dog fighting. It's cruel, inhumane, and it needs to be stopped. Show your strength and join me, Tito Ortiz, The Huntington Beach Bad Boy, in Knocking Out Dog Fighting."

Mixed Martial Arts Champion Andrei Arlovski: "The pit bull has a long history in America. In the early 1900s, the U.S. proudly used pit bulls on WWI posters to symbolize qualities that make up America - friendly, courageous, hard working and worthy of respect. I chose my name because I admire the breed for the same reasons. When I hear about pit bulls being used in dog fighting, it makes me angry. I have a choice to step into the cage to fight, but these dogs have no choice. Dog fighting is morally wrong and inhumane. In my opinion, it's torture. Please join me in Knocking Out Dog Fighting."

Mixed Martial Arts Champion Cung Le: "Dog fighting is cruel and inhumane and those who engage in it are losers. Show your strength and join me in Knocking Out Dog Fighting."

Mixed Martial Arts Champion Josh Thomson: "Torturing or abusing animals is not cool nor is it a sign of strength. Real fighters stand up for what is right to protect those less able to do so. Show your strength and join me in Knocking Out Dog Fighting."

Mixed Martial Arts Champion Rob McCullough: "I choose to fight, but a lot of dogs don't get that choice. Knock Out Dog Fighting...cuz dog fighting is not cool."

=== Increased enforcement, penalty ===
In recent times, a combination of animal rights groups and law enforcement agencies have drawn new attention to dog fighting and related criminal activities in the United States. A story in the New York Daily News published on June 10, 2007, stated "dog fighting is a multi-million-dollar industry that is part of an underground subculture that holds its events in secret locations. It is extremely difficult for authorities to prove who has dogs for fighting purposes." A few weeks later, in Buffalo, New York, police and animal control officers at the City of Buffalo Animal Shelter rescued 15 pit bulls believed to be part of dogfighting activities during a two-week period. Authorities found pit bulls — dead and alive — as well as "dogfighting kits", which include harnesses, muzzles, pre-fight training guides, stacks of breeding papers, and even videos on dogfighting. "We have been back to the same house three different times, and each time we pull out more and more dogs," said Animal Control Officer Andrew Kleinfelder. "Even when someone is arrested, a normal pit bull fighting ring has at least 30 people involved. Someone keeps the fights going."

This crackdown has also resulted in longer sentences for dogfighting. In South Carolina, David Tant, breeder of fighting dogs, is serving a 30-year sentence, among the stiffest ever imposed for the crime. Tant, 63, formerly of the Charleston area, pleaded guilty in November 2004 to more than 40 counts of illegally breeding fighting dogs, and one assault count connected to a surveyor who was wounded by a booby trap after he wandered onto Tant's property in southern Charleston County. The surveyor was showered by an explosion of birdshot, injuring him slightly. The device was described as a "directional mine" meant to ward off intruders. "Fat Bill" Reynolds of Henry County, Virginia near Martinsville, publisher of American Gamedog Times, a dog fighting magazine with an Internet website, was convicted in 2001 of transmitting images of fighting dogs across state lines and sentenced to 30 months in prison.

=== Arrests, seizures, and convictions ===
==== March 2007, Dayton Ohio ====
In March 2007, a combined Federal, state and local law enforcement team disrupted a large dog fighting network in Dayton, Ohio which was operating in Ohio, Kentucky, and Michigan. The investigation of the operation based in Montgomery County, Ohio had lasted a year. More than two dozen arrests were made and more than 60 dogs were seized. In May, 7 persons in Ohio submitted guilty pleas to state charges. Sentencing was pending at the time of a USDA news release in June 2007.

==== April 2007, Pass Christian, Mississippi ====
On April 24, authorities in Pass Christian, Mississippi raided a large dog fighting training compound owned by Maxwell Landry. According to several news stories on local television station WLOX, 17 persons were arrested and fighting dogs from Louisiana, crack cocaine and several other illicit drugs were found at the scene and confiscated. 44 pit bulls were seized. Landry once lived in Chalmette, Louisiana. After the area was damaged as a result of Hurricane Katrina in 2005, he moved to the Harrison County, Mississippi site, located about 8 miles (13 km) north of Interstate 10. Federal agents with the Drug Enforcement Administration (DEA) discovered the dogs and the training compound during aerial surveillance relating to an investigation of drug trafficking.

Members of the Louisiana Society for the Prevention of Cruelty to Animals came to help take care of the dogs. Property owner Landry was one of 14 people named in a Federal drug trafficking indictment involving activity between Mississippi, Louisiana and South Carolina. He faces to 43 counts of illegal dog fighting in Harrison County.

John Wesley Black and Constance Jean Courtney could spend a minimum of one year in prison per illegal dog fighting charge, and are linked to two dog fighting allegations. Courtney was employed as a veterinarian's assistant. According to Harrison County Prosecutor Herman Cox, Landry has confessed to investigators that he made about $5,000 a month fighting his dogs against other dogs.

==== April 2007 Surry, Virginia ====
On April 25, 2007, an investigation began in Virginia after evidence of a dog fighting ring turned up during a narcotics search of a 15-acre (61,000 m^{2}) home and property owned by Michael Vick, a professional football player with the Atlanta Falcons of the NFL and a dog breeder. The property is located in southeastern Surry County a few miles northwest of the Isle of Wight County town of Smithfield. The original search began following several narcotics arrests of 26-year-old Davon T. Boddie, Vick's cousin and cook, who had given authorities the address of Vick's property at 1915 Moonlight Road, Surry, Virginia as his home address when he was arrested.

The investigation eventually involved local, state and Federal authorities. In late April, Vick told The Atlanta Journal-Constitution "I'm never at the house…I left the house with my family…They just haven't been doing the right thing…It's unfortunate I have to take the heat behind it. If I'm not there, I don't know what's going on."

On July 2, agents of the U.S. Department of Agriculture (USDA) filed court documents describing a five-year operation of an interstate dog fighting ring which called itself "Bad Newz Kennels" and had been based at Vick's property. No one was named individually in the July 2 court papers. WAVY-TV (Portsmouth, Virginia) posted a copy of one of the Federal court document from July 2, and has made it available online.

On July 17, Vick and three men described as his employees were indicted by a Federal grand jury for "conspiracy to travel in interstate commerce in aid of unlawful activities and to sponsor a dog in animal fighting venture". They faced $350,000 in fines and six years in prison if convicted of the Federal felony and misdemeanor charges.

Details in the indictments describing extreme acts of brutality against losing and under-performing dogs included executions by electrocution, hanging, drowning, shooting, and blunt force resulted in widespread public protests and calls for Vick's removal from NFL play pending resolution by a diverse spectrum of notable persons and public officials. On July 23, Commissioner Roger Goodell suspended him for an indefinite period pending investigation of possible violations of the league's Personal Conduct Policy. Atlanta Falcons team owner Arthur Blank stated that Vick should give up thoughts of playing until the case is resolved.

An arraignment and detention hearing was held on July 26 in U.S. District Court in Richmond. A trial date was set for November 26, and all four defendants were released without bond, but under the direct supervision of the court and under certain conditions. Federal prosecutors stated they would file a superseded indictment in August, which could have included additional charges and/or defendants. According to the Code of Virginia at the time, various violations of the Virginia laws involving dog fighting and cruelty to companion animals were considered class 6 felony crimes, each carrying a fine and 1 to 5 years in prison per offense. Over fifty dogs were seized, in addition to carcasses recovered during several searches of Vick's property.

On August 24, Vick plead guilty. He joined three others who had also plead guilty earlier to similar charges. The four faced up to five years in prison, fines of up to $250,000 and restitution. Each received sentences ranging from 60 days to 23 months.

==== June 2007 Richmond, Virginia ====
In June 2007, a circuit court judge in Richmond, Virginia imposed a four-year prison sentence and $20,000 in fines on 40-year-old Stacey A. Miller, an Army veteran and convicted dog fighter. The Richmond Times-Dispatch reported that Miller was convicted in January by a jury of felony dogfighting, two counts of felony animal cruelty, a dozen counts of misdemeanor animal cruelty and two counts of possessing steroids. The jury recommended the four-year sentence and $20,000 in fines that the judge imposed. Miller also was ordered to pay Richmond Animal Care and Control $26,205.29 in restitution for the cost of caring for the 15 American pit bull terriers that were seized from him in February 2006, 12 of which had to be euthanized.

==== July 2007 South Holland, Illinois ====
On July 13, 2007, police in a suburb of Chicago, Illinois rescued 37 fighting dogs from a heavily insulated and ventilated old chicken coop behind a house in the village of South Holland. At a news conference, Cook County Sheriff Tom Dart stated that it was "the largest seizure of fighting dogs in state history."

According to the Chicago Tribune, an investigation began in May after police were informed that fighting dogs were being bred and raised at the home. Two workers for an animal shelter said that they had tipped off police. Officials close to the investigation confirmed their role. Neighbors told the news media that they had also called police to complain about barking from the barn and what was described as "a stench" by several. One neighbor said that he had called police several months ago after seeing a dog chained in the yard on a hot day without water. Another neighbor who lives across the street told reporters that he began seeing police in unmarked cars watching the home several weeks earlier, and one investigator had interviewed him about a week before the raid. The Tribune reported that the neighbor said that he told the investigator "...the place was like a gas station, people coming and going constantly at night...I thought maybe he was dealing drugs."

Executing a warrant, a team formed by the Cook County sheriff's police special operations unit, Cook County animal control, and the South Holland Police Department entered the property and the soundproofed barn, seizing the dogs and evidence. They also found a boa constrictor snake and a substance suspected of being crack cocaine inside of the home, according to a WLS-TV (Chicago) news report.

The Chicago Sun-Times reported that the site had "all the makings of a sophisticated and professional dog fighting operation." It was noted that treadmills and weights were nearby for building strength, while a female dog was kept in a separate room where breeding was done. Drugs used to make them stronger and fight harder were also found. One of the dogs, larger than the pit bulls and described as "urine-soaked" with its hair falling out, was thought to be a "bait dog" used in training others.

WBBM radio news reported that the dogs seized in the raid ranged from weeks-old puppies to older dogs, some of whom suffered from physical injuries. Officers wore industrial masks Friday as they rescued the dogs, which were kept in pet transport carriers in the barn and positioned in a way that restricted sunlight. Several of the carriers had bite marks around their openings. Dart described the conditions inside the barn as horrible. "It's very difficult to breathe inside," he said. "The smell is overwhelming, and the conditions are deplorable."

Sheriff Dart said it was clear that the 29-year-old homeowner was an active ringleader on the dog-fighting circuit, breeding fighting dogs while renting out others for matches and raking in hundreds of dollars each time. Kevin Taylor was known to authorities. He has two prior convictions related to dog fighting, including cruelty to animals. He was convicted On June 15, 2007 in Livingston County after being arrested for attending dog fights near Pontiac in September 2005. According to news reports, a Livingston County jury convicted Taylor on a Class C misdemeanor charge. He paid a fine of $1,275 and spent six days in jail, a total that counts his initial arrest and subsequent arrests on bench warrants after he failed to show for court dates.

On July 14, Taylor was charged with 37 misdemeanor counts of cruelty to animals, a felony count of possession of a controlled substance, a felony count of dog-fighting and two other misdemeanor charges, one count each of possession of dogs by a felon and owning sport fighting dogs. Sheriff Dart said that although Taylor is thought to have bred and trained the dogs to sell or rent there, evidence did not indicate that any dogfights took place at the South Holland location. On July 16, Cook County Circuit Judge Camille Willis set Taylor's bond at $100,000.

==== January 2025 Paulding County, Georgia ====
Over 100 chained dogs were discovered in November 2022 after an Amazon driver made a report. The dog owner, Vincent Burrell, was convicted on 93 counts of dog fighting and 10 counts of cruelty to animals. In January, 2025, Burrell was sentenced to 475 years in prison.

== U.S. senators speak out ==
On July 19, 2007, U.S. Senator Robert Byrd, 89, of West Virginia, a well-known dog lover, gave a passionate speech in the U.S. Congress about the practice of dog fighting in response to the indictment of football player Michael Vick. Senator Byrd stated:

Dog fighting is a brutal, sadistic event motivated by barbarism of the worst sort and cruelty of the worst, worst, worst sadistic kind. One is left wondering, who are the real animals... the creatures inside the ring, or the creatures outside the ring.

The following day, Senator John Kerry of Massachusetts said he had sent a letter to the NFL commissioner calling for Vick's immediate suspension. Kerry wrote to Commissioner Roger Goodell:

Dogfighting is one of society's most barbaric and inhumane activities.

Kerry, the 2004 Democratic presidential nominee, also said he planned to introduce anti-dogfighting legislation. According to his office, Senator Kerry's proposal would make it illegal to transmit images of dogfighting, to run Web sites that cater to dogfighting, and to own or train dogs for the purpose of fighting under Federal laws.

== See also ==
- Dog fighting
- Dog attack
- Dogs in the United States
- Animal welfare in the United States
- Wendy Bergen
