= DogTown =

- Country of origin: United States
- No. of seasons: 4
- No. of episodes: 28

Original release
- Network: National Geographic Channel
- Release: January 4, 2008 – March 12, 2010

DogTown is a National Geographic Channel series set at the Best Friends Animal Sanctuary, a 33,000-acre (130 km^{2}) animal facility in southern Utah. It is a documentary-style program that profiles staff and volunteers as they care for dogs in need of homes. Many animals featured are severely abused or neglected or in need of specialized medical treatment. The goal is usually to secure each dog an adoptive home but if this is not possible, animals are cared for at the sanctuary for the remainder of their lives.

The show first aired on January 4, 2008, and continued for four seasons. The final episode aired on March 12, 2010. By participating in the series, the sanctuary aimed to raise public awareness of issues in animal welfare as well as funds for their life-saving work. Best Friends Animal Society has credited the show with dramatically improving membership, volunteer, and visitor numbers, as well as helping secure homes for many dogs on the program.

On June 10, 2015, The CW announced that it would add a revival of the series, titled Dog Town, USA, to its Saturday One Magnificent Morning block, beginning July 4, 2015.

A video game based on the show was released for Windows XP and Windows Vista in 2009. In the game DogTown, the player would give the dogs medical treatment and training in order to find the dogs a home.

== Program Format ==
Each episode typically features three cases. Veterinarians Mike Dix and Patti Iampietro treat dogs in need of medical care, while behavioral issues are addressed by trainers John Garcia, Pat Whitacre, Ann Allums, Michelle Besmehn and Sherry Woodard.

In addition to the four seasons released by National Geographic, Best Friends Animal Society released a video titled "DogTown Unleashed", providing updates on various dogs and a behind-the-scenes looks at DogTown.

== Michael Vick Dogs ==
In its second-season premiere, DogTown profiled the rehabilitation of four American pit bull Terriers rescued from the property of NFL player Michael Vick in April 2007. The dogs' placement with Best Friends was the subject of some controversy. Following their removal from the dogfighting compound both PETA and the Humane Society of the United States advocated the dogs be euthanized; a court ruling, however, allowed 22 of the most badly abused dogs to be placed at Best Friends for rehabilitation. Following their progress, one of the dogs, Georgia, went on to make media appearances with trainer John Garcia, including on The Ellen DeGeneres Show.

The two-hour episode featuring the Vick dogs rated well, becoming the National Geographic Channel's highest rating Friday night premiere and highest rating second-season premiere, in network history.

== Episodes ==
=== Series overview ===
Season	Episodes	Originally released	
Season	Episodes	First released	Last released
1	5	January 4, 2008	September 12, 2008
2	5	September 19, 2008	October 25, 2008
3	8	April 3, 2009	May 22, 2009
4	10	January 1, 2010	March 12, 2010

=== Season 1 (2008) ===
No. overall	No. in season	Title	Original release date
1	1	"Second Chances"	January 4, 2008
A DogTown trainer works to rehabilitate a dog almost put to death for biting an infant and two puppies are rescued from a garbage dump. Can DogTown's veterinary staff stabilize an old chow with a brain tumor so he'll have a chance to live out the rest of his life in the comfort of someone's home?
2	2	"Crisis Dogs"	January 11, 2008
Authorities raid a puppy mill and a trainer is sent in to rescue the most traumatized dogs--including a terrier mix who has been driven to the brink of madness. A Lab mix faces a mysterious illness and two sibling pups are rescued from a sect that routinely shoots unwanted dogs.
3	3	"The Outsiders"	January 18, 2008
DogTown must transform a spaniel-mix from a painfully shy, fearful dog into a happy, friendly one and determine if a 1-year-old bulldog with unusual symptoms has a life threatening condition or if he's stable enough to live in a home. And, a veteran DogTown resident known for attacking other dogs may finally be ready to live in a home if his violent tendencies are truly gone.
4	4	"New Beginnings"	September 5, 2008
DogTown experts help a car-struck young hound who loses a limb make the difficult transition to life on three legs. A terrier mix with a history of biting and a scotty traumatized by her experience as a breeder in a puppy mill arrive for rehabilitation. (Note: This episode not on the DVD that's available for purchase.)
5	5	"Project Rescue"	September 12, 2008
DogTown's experts rush to the Nevada desert to save a group of dogs left neglected by a hoarder. (Note: This episode not on the DVD that's available for purchase.)

=== Season 2 (2008) ===
No. overall	No. in season	Title	Original release date
6	1	"Saving the Michael Vick Dogs"	September 19, 2008
After an illegal dogfighting venture is discovered on a property owned by former Atlanta Falcons quarterback Michael Vick, 47 dogs were given a chance for a better life. 22 of the toughest cases were sent to DogTown, one of the largest no-kill animal facilities in the country. Follow the journeys of four of the most challenging Vick dogs as DogTown's team of dedicated experts work to help them overcome their violent pasts and live happier, healthier lives.
7	2	"New Lives"	October 3, 2008
A border collie mix arrives at DogTown unable to walk without extreme pain and veterinarians hope that a high-tech underwater treadmill will help him recover from his injuries. A Weimaraner is paralyzed with anxiety. Will behavior consultants be able to help him regain his self-confidence?
8	3	"Road to Recovery"	October 10, 2008
DogTown helps rehabilitate Vivian, a Katrina survivor, who is terrified of strangers and exhibits behaviors that are similar to post-traumatic stress in humans. A dog rescued from a hoarder is found in desperate need of medical attention.
9	4	"The Survivors"	October 17, 2008
DogTown faces one of the toughest cases yet when Aristotle, a rescued terrier mix, arrives with a skin condition that has left him nearly hairless. And, after an urgent, live-saving rescue of eight beagles is made, DogTown discovers that one, named Electra, has a potentially fatal illness caused by parasitic worms.
10	5	"Against the Odds"	October 25, 2008
A DogTown team travels to Los Angeles to rescue several older dogs from an overcrowded puppy mill. Many have severe medical issues and have never seen a vet. Then an adult Lab mix with a persistent cough is rescued from a neglectful home by an animal welfare group and receives a risky surgical procedure.

=== Season 3 (2009) ===
No. overall	No. in season	Title	Original release date
11	1	"Starting Over"	April 3, 2009
Two street dogs rescued from Ethiopia come to DogTown for a shot at domestic life; a Blood Hound returns after attacking a man; and a Golden Retriever with a mangled paw arrives for medical care, but may lose a leg.
12	2	"New Hope"	April 10, 2009
The stories of Rush, a Shepard mix rescued from the Lebanon-Israel, the special case of a beagle named Jasmine, and Scruffy, a Hurricane Katrina survivor, are driven by the Dogtown philosophy that kindness to animals builds a better world for all.
13	3	"A Fighting Chance"	April 17, 2009
Music star Emmylou Harris calls for help with a vicious shepherd mix named Gunnar, leaving animal behavior specialist Sherry Woodard only a few days to come up with a plan to overcome his aggression.
14	4	"A Fresh Start"	April 24, 2009
The trainers and veterinarians of DogTown struggle to give three dogs a fresh start. Bingo, a painfully shy shepherd mix, must be socialized while Casey's hyper temperament has kept him from being adopted for five years. For Zambi, a black lab mix, a grueling 8-hour surgery is a last chance at life.
15	5	"Will To Survive"	May 1, 2009
Trainers John, Pat, and Ann must face the challenges of nursing an emaciated chocolate lab to health, teaching basic skills to a blind puppy, and, hardest of all, training Chico who came to the sanctuary after killing chickens and a pet Yorkie.
16	6	"Life After Dogtown"	May 8, 2009
A special "where are they now" episode, updating the stories of some of Dogtown's favorite patients: Tuffy, the Pointer-mix found nearly dead in the desert; Remington and Ruger, two inseparable outdoor hounds; Wiggles, the abandoned Bulldog and more.
17	7	"Friends in Need"	May 15, 2009
A young Pit Bull is found on the street after Hurricane Gustav while a Sheltie mix known for her dangerous past must learn that rewards follow good behavior. Ellie, a neglected Hound-mix, must be patiently cared for before she can find a new home.
18	8	"Rescue and Renewal"	May 22, 2009
Dog Care Manager Michelle Besmehn travels to Parkersburg, West Virginia to bring back several dogs rescued from a mass breeding operation-- all require extensive medical care and socialization before they can go to permanent, happy homes.

=== Season 4 (2010) ===
No. overall	No. in season	Title	Original release date
19	1	"Dogfight"	January 1, 2010
20	2	"Bright Futures"	January 8, 2010
21	3	"Homeward Bound"	January 15, 2010
22	4	"Sanctuary"	January 22, 2010
23	5	"The Road Home"	January 29, 2010
24	6	"Close Calls"	February 5, 2010
25	7	"Search and Rescue"	February 19, 2010
26	8	"Chance For Change"	February 26, 2010
27	9	"Puppy Mill Rescue"	March 5, 2010
28	10	"Dogs In Need"	March 12, 2010

== Home releases ==
Dogtown
Season	Release date	Comments
DogTown: Second Chances	July 1, 2008	Features three episodes from Season 1 ('Second Chances', 'Crisis Dogs', and 'The Outsiders'), plus bonus features 'Doggy Updates: Where Are They Now?' and 'About Best Friends Animal Sanctuary'
DogTown: New Beginnings	January 6, 2009	Features two episodes from Season 1 ('New Beginnings' and 'Project Rescue') and three episodes from Season 2 ('New Lives', 'Road to Recovery', and 'Saving the Micheal Vick Dogs'), plus deleted scenes.
DogTown: Friends In Need	October 27, 2009	Features two episodes from Season 2 ('The Survivors' and 'Against the Odds') and all eight episodes from Season 3, plus bonus features 'Rescue Dogs', 'Archie & Electra's New Rug', and 'About Best Friends Animal Sanctuary'

Most episodes are also available in two volumes in the iTunes Store.
