= BAD RAP (organization) =

Bay Area Dog-lovers Responsible About Pit Bulls
- Abbreviation: BAD RAP
- Legal status: Foundation
- Purpose: Humane care for animals
- Headquarters: Oakland, California
- Region served: United States
- Official language: English
- Website: badrap.org

BAD RAP (acronym for Bay Area Dog-lovers Responsible About Pit Bulls) is an animal welfare and rescue group based in Oakland, California, devoted to caring for and improving the public image of pit bull terriers as pets.

== Overview ==
BAD RAP is a federal non-profit organization (under IRS Code 501(c)3) located in Oakland, California. It was incorporated in 1999 to address the needs of homeless dogs, specifically homeless American Pit Bull Terriers, and to provide support and resources to animal welfare organizations that deal with pit bulls. The organization also focuses on providing owner support, in the form of training, spay/neuter assistance and other resources, to families who own pit bulls.

== Activities ==
Programs include a volunteer foster care for homeless dogs, "Pit Ed" dog training classes for the public, and AKC Canine Good Citizen Certification prep classes with regular testing events. BAD RAP also advises shelters around the country in best practices for creating viable adoption programs for their sheltered pit bulls. The group ran a "Breed Ambassador" program inside the East Bay SPCA from 2005–2008 and inside Oakland Animal Services from 2008–2010. BAD RAP hosts animal welfare professionals in conferences and workshops and offers hands-on training to help them gain a working knowledge of the breed in quarterly week-long camps hosted in Oakland. Its public outreach work includes free "Shots Fairs" and a spay/neuter voucher program in low-income communities.

== Achievements ==
In its first two years of operation, the organization rescued 74 dogs, of which 72 were successfully adopted. Since its beginnings, BAD RAP has placed approximately 40 dogs a year in new homes, although its primary purpose is education and advocacy. In 2006, BAD RAP received the American Humane Association's award for Best Practices in Behavior and Training for its Pit Ed and Canine Good Citizen Prep classes.

== Dog fighting cases ==
In September 2007, BAD RAP was contracted by the federal government to participate in evaluating 49 pit bulls from Bad Newz Kennels, Michael Vick's dog fighting operation, as part of nine-person ASPCA-led evaluation team. BAD RAP member Tim Racer later returned to Virginia to re-evaluate 48 of the pit bulls alongside the court-appointed attorney, Special Guardian/Master Rebecca Huss, and assisted in recommendations for placement. This work led to the release of 47 of the dogs to rescue or sanctuary. Co-founders Racer and Reynolds were nominated for Sports Illustrated's 2007 Sportsman of the Year award for their role in the rescue of the dogs. For their work with the Vick dogs, BAD RAP was awarded a portion of the $928,073 fine that the court ordered Vick to pay for the care of the dogs, as well as $5000 for each dog BAD RAP rescued from the dog fighting bust, and "$18,275 per dog for 'each dog that was likely to spend a significant amount of time, if not the dog’s remaining lifetime, in a more restrictive environment such as a foster home or sanctuary environment."

After the gag order was lifted on those who were helping in the Vick case, BAD RAP members and dogs appeared on several television shows, including CNN, the Rachael Ray Show, Animal Planet, and ESPN's E:60. Media coverage also included articles in the Washington Post, Los Angeles Times, Bark Magazine, and Sports Illustrated.

In April 2009, BAD RAP participated in a closed-door meeting in Las Vegas with several animal welfare leaders to encourage the Humane Society of the United States to end its decades-long stance of recommending the euthanasia of all dogs seized in fighting operations. That meeting resulted in a policy change and formation of a working group of six organizations, including BAD RAP, to monitor the effects of the change.

In August 2009, BAD RAP representatives were again contracted by the federal government to evaluate two groups of dogs that were seized as a result of what is being called the largest federal dog fighting sweep in the midwest.
