= Harrison Forbes =

American animal behaviorist

- Born: May 6, 1969 (age 57); Jackson, Tennessee, U.S.
- Occupation: Animal Behaviorist
- Years active: 1994–present
- Website: harrisonforbes.com

Harrison Forbes (born May 6, 1969) is an animal behaviorist who is billed as a "celebrity pet expert". With a career spanning a quarter of a century, Harrison has hosted radio shows, television events, and authored a book all about animal care.

== Career ==
Harrison began his career as a dog trainer and eventually began hosting Pet Talk Radio Show on WNWS-FM in Jackson, Tennessee. Forbes career would eventually elevate him to national syndication and high-profile clientele. He has appeared on Larry King Live, Fox News Network, CNN, CBS Morning Show, The Today Show, The View, and more. He has contributed to PEOPLE Pets, Family Circle, The Wall Street Journal, The Boston Globe, and USA Today, among other publications, and is the bestselling author of the book Dog Talk.
