= Bernard Waters =

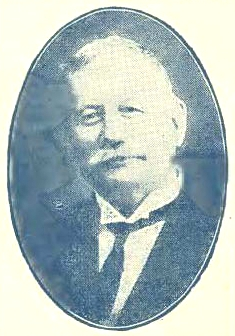
- Bernard "Benjamin" Waters in an undated picture from his obituary in the March 11, 1911 issue of Sporting Life
- Born: 1852; New York
- Died: February 27, 1911 (aged 58–59); Berkshire Apartments, 612 West 179th Avenue, New York City
- Resting place: Katonah Ave, Kensico Cemetery, Valhalla, New York
- Other names: Benjamin Waters, Kingrail
- Occupations: Sportsman, Conservationist, Journalist, Editor, Reporter and Author
- Employer(s): Forest and Stream Publishing Company

Bernard Waters (1852–1911), also known as Benjamin Waters, was an American sportsman, professional dog trainer, field trial judge, conservationist, editor, reporter and author who wrote a number of books about sporting dogs under the pen name "Kingrail" around the turn of the 19th/20th centuries.

Mr. Waters was a member of the handicap committee at the 1900 Grand American trap shoot and was employed as an editor by Forest and Stream Publishing Company (forerunner of Field & Stream magazine), which was located at 318 Broadway in New York City.

== Publications ==
=== Books ===
- Modern Training, Handling and Kennel Management, Chicago, The Blakely Printing Co., 1889, 373p
- The American Book of the Dog, Chicago and New York, Rand, McNally and Company, 1891, 702 p
- Training and Handling of the Dog, Boston, Little Brown, 1894, 332p
- Modern Training and Handling, Boston, J. Loring Thayer Publishing Co, 1894, 332p.
- Fetch and Carry, a Treatise on Retrieving, New York, Forest and Stream Publishing Company, 1895, 124p.
- Training the Hunting Dog for the Field and Field Trials, New York, Forest and Stream Publishing Company, 1st edition 1901, 2nd edition 1908, 281p.

=== Periodicals ===
- Outing Magazine
  - Field Trials of Setters and Pointers. Outing, September 1902, Vol. XXXX, No. 6 pp. 728–732
  - The New York Dog Show. The Sporting Classes. Outing, April, 1903, Vol. XLII, No. 1, p. 130-131
- Sporting Life
- Wildwood's Magazine
