= Community cat =

Cats with no specific owner but cared for by locals

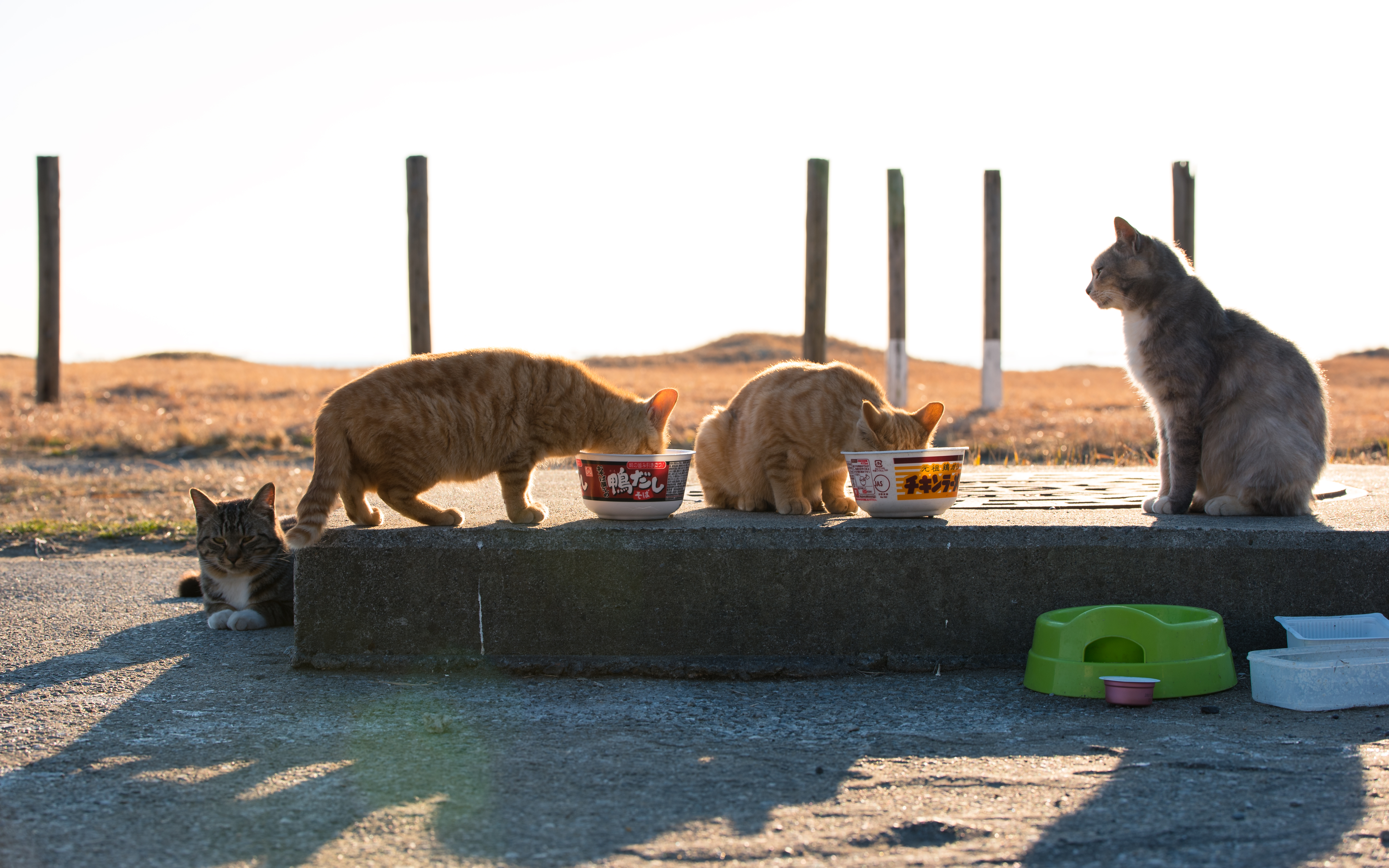
Community cats

A community cat (地域猫, chiiki-neko) in Japan is a cat that does not have a specific owner but is recognized and collectively taken care of by the local residents. Community cat care refers to efforts made by community members to eradicate stray cats through such means as surgical sterilization and finding adoption families. Stray cats that are managed under this care system are called community cats.

== Definition of community cat care ==
While the precise definition of community cats and cat care activities varies depending on local municipalities, regions, and organizations, the following issues are of concern:

=== Control of stray cats ===
In order to accomplish its ultimate goal of ending stray cats, the community cat care activity conducts population management by sterilizing and recruiting those willing to adopt them. To this end, the method of TNR (Trapping the cats, Neutering and spaying them, and Returning them to their original habitat) is employed to prevent the breeding of stray cats. Some municipalities subsidize the cost of spaying and neutering surgeries.

Cats that have undergone such surgery are marked with a V-shaped cut in one of their ears. Because their ears resemble cherry blossom petals, the treated cats are also called sakura (cherry blossom) cats. Generally, females receive a cut on their left ear, while males have it on their right ear.

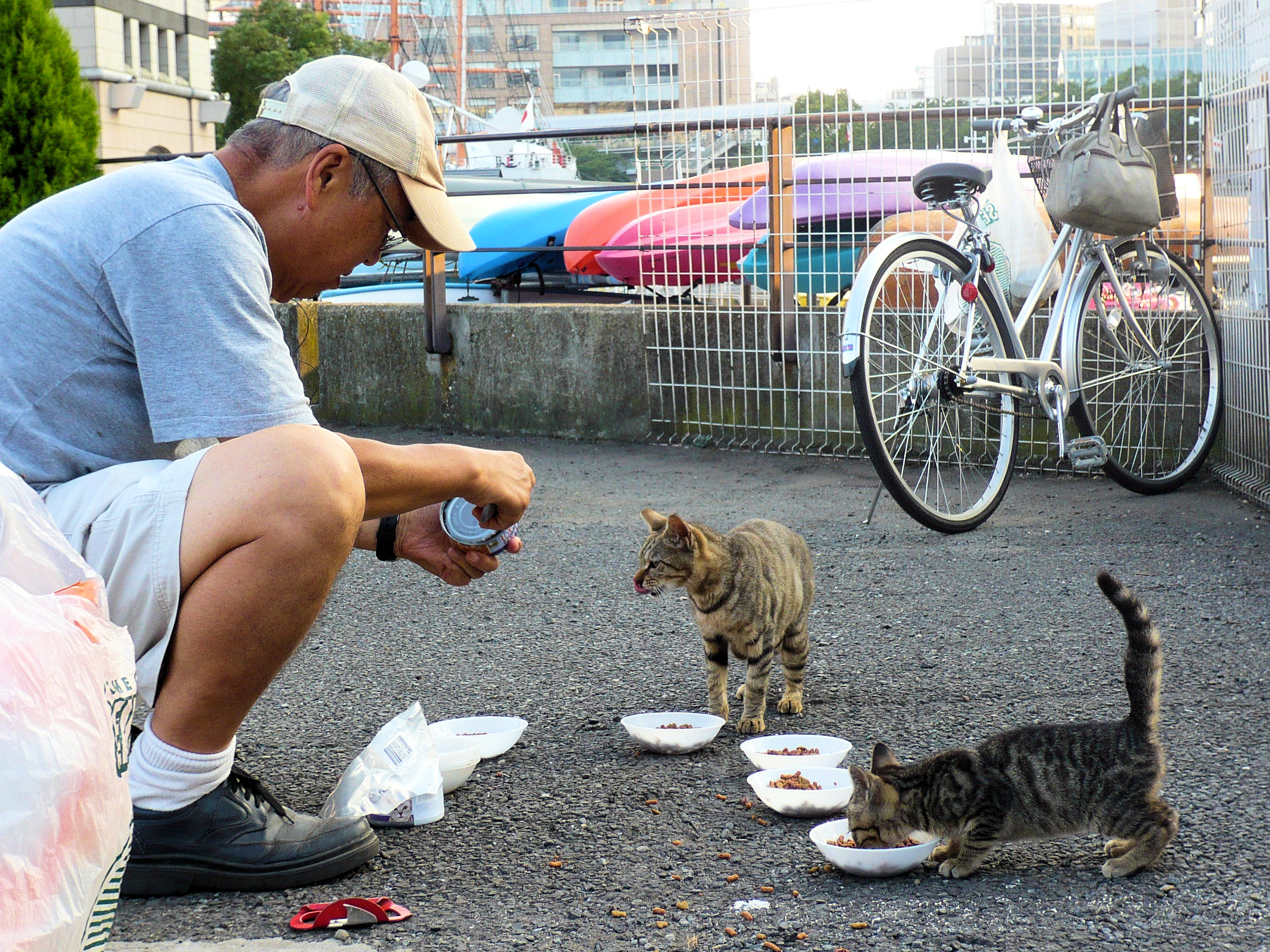
A person feeding two stray cats

Being placed under local management to control the population size, these cats spend their entire lives within that community. Concurrently, it is mandatory to raise awareness that abandoning animals, including cats, is prohibited by the Animal Welfare and Management Law, and efforts should be made to prevent the increase of new stray cats.

=== Prevention of conflicts with local residents ===
==== Public sanitation ====
In addition to providing food and water for cats, disposing of their waste, and preventing them from scavenging through trash, it is necessary to take measures against damage caused by birds, pests, and rodents due to inadequate disposal of leftover food as well as against cat allergies and zoonotic diseases such as toxoplasmosis, which can pose a danger to residents.

==== Excrement damages ====
Community members need to install toilets and handle waste.

==== Cat food ====
It is necessary to designate and enforce specific times for feeding and cleaning leftovers for cats that are neutered or scheduled to be neutered. In particular, continuing to provide food will lead to an endless influx of cats, thus rendering the efforts to reduce the number of stray cats futile.

==== Intrusion into human living area ====
Cats may intrude into private yards and cause damage to gardening and agricultural crops through defecation and other harmful behavior. Also, stray cats may attack house pets.

=== Getting Support from Local Residents ===
The obligation for cat ownership is outlined in the “Standards for Keeping and Managing Household Animals,” but unlike dogs, there are no provisions such as leashing requirements or a registration system based on the Rabies Prevention Law. According to Yasushi Kurosawa, a Yokohama city staff and the initiator of the community cat program, if the government disposes of owned cats without permission, it may be charged with crimes such as theft, embezzlement of lost property, and property damage. It may even be possible to be sued for damage claims based on Civil Law and held accountable for the illegal actions. Given the varying perspectives and circumstances among local residents, the community cat initiatives must facilitate a mutual understanding that it concerns all individuals in the community. Kurosawa emphasizes the importance of thorough spaying and neutering procedures, along with the establishment of rules that will be upheld in surrounding areas.

== Challenges ==
The term community cats and the achievements of the care activity are the only ones being focused upon, and it is noted that this focus may lead to self-satisfaction for those who like cats, especially when it comes to feeding them. There have been reported cases of individuals who are unable to care for the cat, pushing those responsibilities onto the local community and its residents. There have also been cases where community cat programs proceed without agreements between proponents and opponents, leading to regional conflicts.

According to a precedent set by the Tokyo District Court, simply providing food may not be considered community cat activity if understanding from residents is not achieved or if there is a lack of management efforts.

Moreover, changes in the composition of the community may lead to conflicts arising from differences in perception. In some cases, there may also be instances of abuse by individuals who oppose community cat activities. It has been pointed out that some municipalities are forced to euthanize cats, that budget and personnel are limited, and that a boardroom situation arises between those who wish to dispose of the cats and those who wish to keep them alive.

=== Abandoned cats ===
Community cat activities face the risk of collapse when the fundamental goal of controlling the number of cats to a level acceptable to residents is not understood. If cats continue to be abandoned from nearby areas and the cat population becomes uncontrollable, the entire initiative may break down. Reporting to police upon discovery and installing signboards have been proposed as potential countermeasures. The Tokyo Taito Ward, selected for the Best Award at the “National Public Health Veterinarians Conference” in 2016, has implemented measures such as using posters to explain the reality of abandoned cats being preyed upon by crows.

=== Persecution of community cats ===
Instances of cruelty or abuse towards community cats, including cases where individuals set traps on their premises, may be considered crimes and addressed officially. Specific cases include suspected deaths by poisoning and rescued cats with injured legs caused by such illegal devices as steel-jaw traps. They were investigated by the police for potential violations of the Animal Welfare Act. Furthermore, animal abuse was found in the area as a result of newly initiated community cat activities.

=== Accuracy of the investigation results ===
A 2008 survey found no direct impact of the local government's support for community cat care on the fluctuation in the number of adopted and euthanized cats. However, the report points out that many municipalities have only recently begun their involvement since 2004, and this relatively short duration must be considered.
