= Graeme Sims =

British dog trainer (born 1937)

- Born: 1937 (age 88–89)
- Occupations: Dog trainer, writer, and painter
- Writing career
- Years active: 1983-present
- Genres: Wildlife and Dog
- Notable works: The Dog Whisperer, Give a Dog a Home
- Website: graemesimsschool.com

Graeme Sims (born 1937) is a dog trainer who developed a system of dog training called The Graeme Sims Method. He has worked with large groups of Border Collies in country fairs in Britain, and published works in English and Italian.

Together with Valentina Teghilllo, he has conducted seminars in the UK and Italy where he taught his training system.

== Books published ==
- The Dog Whisperer: How to Train Your Dog Using Its Own Language, 2009, (Headline), ISBN 978-0-7553-1698-4
- Give a Dog a Home: How to Make Your Rescue Dog a Happy Dog, 2009, (Headline), ISBN 978-0-7553-1704-2
- "L'uomo che sussurra ai cani " (DeAgostini ) ISBN 978-88-418-5851-6
- "Portami con te" (Sperling & Kupfer) ISBN 978-88-200-4803-7
- "Una meravigliosa vita da cani" (Sperling & Kupfer) ISBN 978-88-200-5049-8
