= Sherry Woodard =

American animal behavior consultant and certified dog trainer

- Occupations: Certified dog trainer, ethologist, TV show star
- Years active: 1993–present
- Known for: DogTown TV series
- Website: Speaker profile

Sherry Woodard is an American animal behavior consultant, certified dog trainer, and a star cast member of National Geographic Channel's four-season DogTown series.

== Education ==
Woodard received her dog trainer certification from the Certified Council for Professional Dog Trainers, as well as knowledge-assessed certification. Woodard's Dog Behavior and Handling Workshop was approved for continuing education credit by the same council.

== Career ==
Woodard starred in 31 episodes of National Geographic Channel's series DogTown from 2008 to 2010, mostly filmed on the setting at the southern Utah Best Friends Animal Society's sanctuary. She appeared on NBC's The Today Show with veterinarian Patti Iampietro to talk about their work featured in the Dogtown series.

She worked directly with 22 of the pit bulls from the dog-fighting kennels of Michael Vick, a former Atlanta Falcons football player who served a prison sentence for operating a dogfighting ring. In a profile Q&A in People magazine, Woodard discussed her work with some of the Michael Vick dogs featured on the DogTown show.

Her tips for adopting the right dog and cat were featured in Parade magazine in 2013. She also provided details in 2017 to the Huffington Post on leash training a cat.

In 2014, Parade featured Woodard's Canines with Careers program, which she founded and ran for Best Friends Animal Society beginning in 2009 to train shelter dogs as working canines for people with disabilities or special needs. Woodard designed the program as a nationwide network of trainers who could rescue dogs from shelters and teach them to aid humans. Canines with Careers was included in the book Unconditional Honor: Wounded Warriors and Their Dogs about Woodard successfully placing trained canines in various careers, including with law enforcement officers, K-9 dog handlers for canine search teams, prison staff, first responders during emergencies, and as service dogs with disabled veterans.

In 2013, Woodard helped individuals and groups train and place 380 working dogs through her Canines with Careers program. She participated in a March 2015 celebration of the 25th anniversary of the Americans with Disabilities Act at the Red Rock Center for Independence at Dixie State University in St. George, Utah. Woodard's stated vision of shelter dogs as an option is to "provide a compassionate, less time-consuming and more cost-effective alternative to the traditional model (of service dogs). People’s lives will be enriched and dogs previously without any future are now saved."

Woodard was instrumental in Hurricane Katrina pet rescue, working with thousands of injured and stressed animals left behind in New Orleans in the aftermath of the 2005 storm.
