= Mary Ray (dog trainer) =

- Occupation: Dog trainer

Mary Ray is a professional dog trainer located in the United Kingdom. She is generally credited with creation of heelwork to music in the United Kingdom.

== Obedience ==
Ray has qualified nine dogs to work Championship ‘C’ Obedience; seven Border Collies and two Belgian Shepherds (Tervurens). She has won 59 Kennel Club Obedience Challenge Certificates with five of her dogs and 38 Reserve Certificates. Ray's Belgian Shepherd, Roxy, was the first Belgian Shepherd in the UK to become an Obedience Champion and she also won the Bitch Obedience Championship at Crufts. Ray's also very well known Border Collie Red Hot Toddy was the winner of the Dog Obedience Championship at Crufts. The other main British obedience competition culminating in a final was the Pro Dogs Obedience Stakes. A dog was only allowed to win this competition once in its lifetime and Ray won this on two occasions, once with Toddy and once with Roxy. This competition has now been renamed the Open ‘C’ Charity Competition.

== Agility ==
Ray's agility career started in 1980, just after the birth of agility in the UK. She has either won or been in the finals of every major sponsored British agility competition. This included winning the prestigious Pedigree Agility Stakes with her Border Collie Pepperland Hot Chocolate. She holds the record for qualifying the most dogs on the most occasions for this prestigious final from c. 1982 to 2006. She has also been a member of the Rugby Dog Training Club agility team, which has competed at the Crufts Team Agility Finals on many occasions and a member of the winning team on two occasions, the last being 2004. Ray was also a member of the team that qualified for Crufts 2000. She has also been a member of the Rugby Dog Training Club Crufts Flyball Team, competing in the finals at the Crufts Dog Show. At Crufts in 2004, Ray and Myndoc Simply Teena were winners of the Crufts Mini Agility Championships (Tina is owned by Mrs Shirley Turner but handled and trained by Ray).

== Heelwork to music ==
Although there are conflicting stories about where heelwork to music started, because some groups of obedience enthusiasts trained with music playing in the late 1980s, the first person who actually put together a public performance of heelwork to music was Ray, at a demonstration event in 1990. She did this again in 1992 and thereafter has done it every year (as of 2006) at Crufts. Since c. 1998, Ray has given a demonstration in the Main Ring at Crufts on Best in Show Night, televised by the BBC. It was announced that the 2018 event would be Mary Ray's final Crufts heelwork to music performance.

== Television appearances ==
Ray has appeared on many television programmes, including Blue Peter, (a BBC children's TV programme), twice on Jim Davidson's Generation Game, The Big Breakfast on Channel 4 and three times on the leading morning programme, Richard and Judy. Ray's heelwork to music routine is featured, live from Crufts on BBC1 every year (as of 2006). During 2003, Ray featured as the lead trainer in an episode of Faking It. Rob Archer, the subject of the programme, spent almost three weeks living with Ray and husband, Dave, at their home. When it was broadcast in early 2004, it had the largest audience ratings for any Faking It show to date.

Ray has been married to her husband, Dave, since c. 1979. They live in Rugby, UK. As of 2006, their family consisted of eight dogs (no children): five Border Collies, a Lurcher and two Shetland Sheepdogs.
