= Nick White (politician) =

American politician

Member of New Hampshire House of Representatives for Merrimack 20
- In office December 2, 2020 – December 7, 2022
- Preceded by: Eric Gallager
- Succeeded by: David Doherty

Personal details
- Party: Republican

Nick White is an American politician. He was a member of the New Hampshire House of Representatives and represented Merrimack's 20th district.
