= Bad Newz Kennels =

2007 investigation of a dogfighting ring

Coordinates: 37.06505°N 76.73187°W

Michael Dwayne Vick Tony Taylor Purnell Anthony Peace Quanis Lavell Philips Oscar Allen
- Other names: Vick: Ookie and Ron Mexico; Taylor: T Peace: P-Funk and Funk; Philips: Q Allen: No other names
- Status: Vick and Allen: On probation Others: Federal sentences have expired, awaiting state trial State charges: Vick pleaded guilty, others awaiting trial.
- Convictions: Federal: Conspiracy in interstate commerce/aid of unlawful animal cruelty venture Titlece, Phillips, and Taylor: 3 years federal probation following release, state trials still pending

The Bad Newz Kennels dog fighting investigation began in April 2007 with a search of property in Surry County, Virginia, owned by Michael Vick, who was at the time quarterback for the Atlanta Falcons football team, and the subsequent discovery of evidence of a dog fighting ring. Over seventy dogs, mostly pit bull terriers, with some said to be showing signs of injuries, were seized, along with physical evidence during several searches of Vick's 15-acre (61,000 m^{2}) property by local, state and federal authorities.

The case drew widespread publicity to the issues of animal abuse and dog fighting. It also drew attention to unlawful gambling and drug activities which authorities claim often accompany dog fighting. Subsequently, Vick and three other principals were convicted of federal offense conspiracy charges and imprisoned. Vick was suspended by the NFL, was ordered to pay the Atlanta Falcons back a portion of his earnings, and lost endorsement deals worth millions more. With other creditors also attempting to collect millions of dollars in debts, in July 2008, he filed for Chapter 11 (reorganization) bankruptcy protection.

== Overview ==
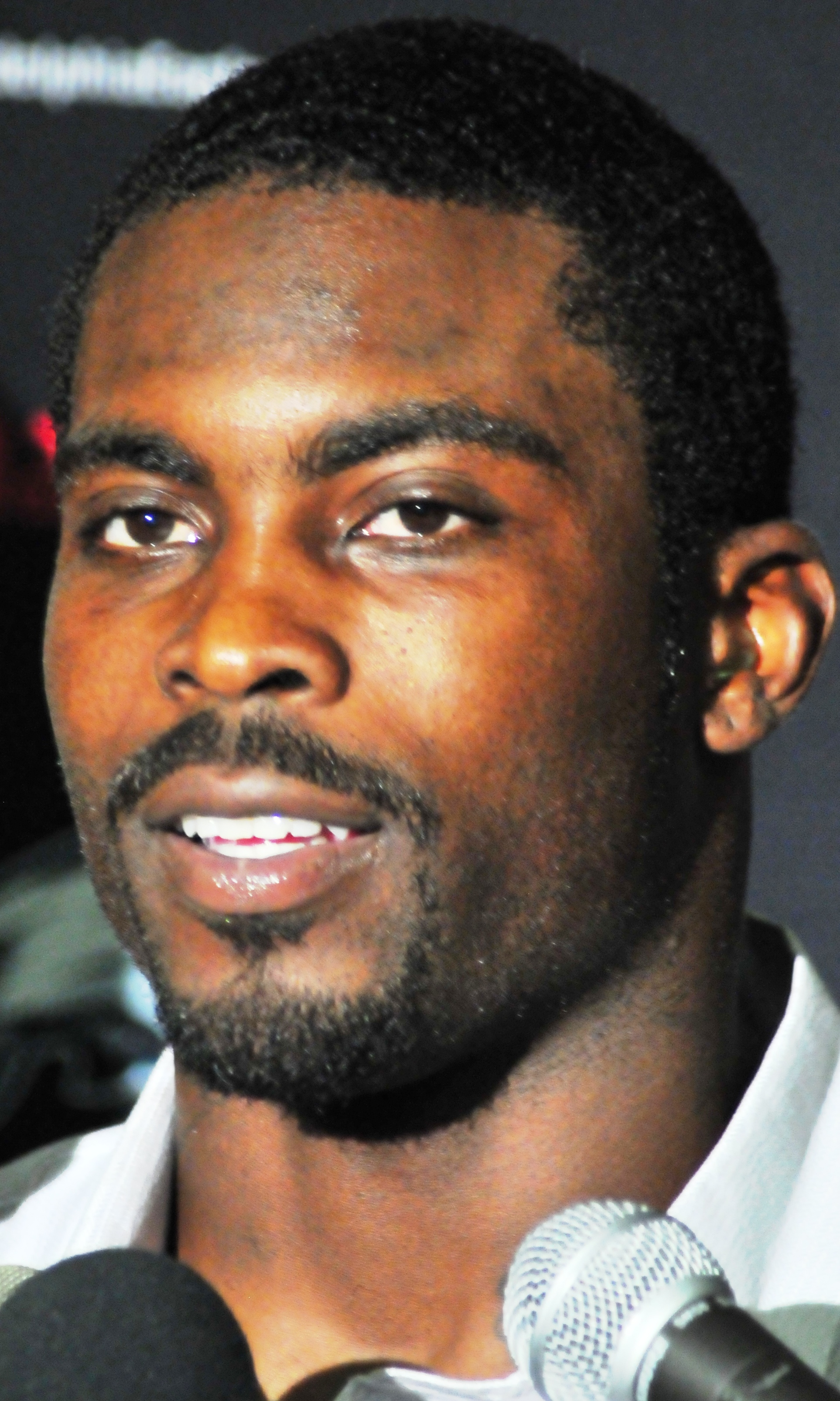
Michael Vick

The Bad Newz dog fighting investigation began in April 2007 with a search of property in Surry County, Virginia, owned by Atlanta Falcons' football quarterback Michael Vick, and the subsequent discovery of evidence of a dog fighting ring in Newport News, Virginia. Over 70 dogs, mostly pit bull terriers, with some said to be showing signs of injuries, were seized along with physical evidence during several searches of Vick's 15-acre (61,000 m^{2}) property by local, state and federal authorities.

In July 2007, Vick and three other men were indicted on federal offense and state felony charges relating to a six-year-long continuing criminal enterprise of an interstate dog fighting ring known as "Bad Newz Kennels", based upon a local nickname for Newport News, Vick's hometown. Allegations included Vick's direct involvement in dog fighting, high-stakes gambling, and brutal executions of dogs. Public outcry resulted from widespread news media publicity of the details which included hanging, drowning, electrocuting, "slamming", and shooting dogs. There were public demonstrations by both Vick supporters and animal rights activists. In consequence, many companies who had been paying for his endorsements withdrew Vick products from retail marketing when he was convicted.

By August 20, all the defendants on the initial federal charges including Vick had agreed to guilty pleas under plea bargain agreements, apparently avoiding facing the possibility of additional and more serious charges under the powerful Racketeer Influenced and Corrupt Organizations Act. U.S. District Court Judge Henry E. Hudson, who was not bound by sentencing recommendations in plea agreements, had previously advised two of the defendants that the aggravated circumstances involving executing the dogs warranted an upward revision of the sentencing guidelines. The single felony charges carry a maximum sentence of five years.

On November 30, Peace and Phillips were sentenced by Judge Hudson to 18 and 21 months in federal prison respectively. The punishments were higher than recommended by federal prosecutors and included three years of supervised probation following their release from prison. During the sentencing, an attorney for Quanis Phillips argued that his client came from a culture in which dog fighting was an accepted practice. He further claimed that Phillips grew up around it and that it was a proving ground for young men to demonstrate their strength, adding "Dogfighting was an accepted and acceptable activity in their world." They attended dogfights as youths. Then, after Vick signed his first NFL contract, "suddenly there's money for these young men to get dogs ... get involved in this world".

Judge Hudson responded that while they might have grown up seeing dogfighting as normal behavior, that did not temper guilt in this case. As he pronounced a sentence which exceeded the guidelines and plea agreement recommendations, he stated: "You may have thought this was sporting, but it was very callous and cruel ... I hope you understand that now."

At the time of the November 30 hearings for Peace and Phillips, Vick was being held at Northern Neck Regional Jail in Warsaw, Virginia where he had turned himself in early while awaiting sentencing on the federal convictions on December 10, 2007. Vick received a harsher sentence than Peace and Phillips after Hudson concluded that the suspended Atlanta Falcons quarterback lied about his direct involvement in killing dogs and about his marijuana use, which was detected in a drug test, as well as his greater role in the criminal enterprise and lesser cooperation during the earlier investigation. Taylor, who is alleged to have had a greater role in the conspiracy than Peace and Phillips, was also due to be sentenced on December 10, but, like Peace and Phillips, had agreed to testify against Vick at trial before he also accepted a plea agreement.

In addition to federal actions, a parallel state investigation had also been underway since April 2007. Surry County prosecutor Gerald L. Poindexter later described the information contained in the federal plea agreements as "a road map to indictments in Surry County". Plea bargains with federal prosecutors would have no official standing in the local cases against any of the four federal co-defendants. (Double jeopardy concepts would not apply to state and federal overlapping cases.) In September 2007, all four men convicted in the federal case were also indicted by the Surry County Grand Jury on state felony charges relating to dog fighting under state laws after indictments were returned by a local grand jury in Surry County, Virginia. Vick faced two felony counts under state laws and his trial in Surry County Circuit Court was initially set for April 2, 2008. The maximum penalty if then convicted on the state charges was 10 years in a state penitentiary. On November 25, 2008, Vick pleaded guilty to a single count of dogfighting and was given a three-year suspended sentence.

In December 2009, Sports Illustrated named Michael Vick and the dog fighting investigation as one of the top 10 sports news stories of the decade of the 2000s.

== Business associates in kennel business at Surry County property ==
In the following several months, various media sources revealed that Vick had close ties and business relationships with three other men who were apparently not his relatives but were involved with the Surry County property and/or his activities with pit bulls prior to April 25. These men were named as Tony Taylor, Quanis L. Phillips, and Charles W. Reamon, Jr. Both Taylor and Phillips have had drug-related brushes with the law; Reamon has had multiple firearms incidents.

Charles W. ("C.J.") Reamon, Jr., is the nephew of Vick's former high school coach, Tommy Reamon. It was reported that in January 2006 he paid the $50 fee to renew the Moonlight Road kennel license which was listed in Taylor's name with Surry County. Tommy Reamon described his nephew as "a good boy who works for Vick". Coach Reamon accused the news media of "trying to destroy" Vick in 2007, which Newport News Daily Press columnist David Teel described as a "tired, transparent and bogus claim".

C.J. Reamon has three convictions related to illegal firearms or airport security, including being caught for lying about his criminal record when he was employed in security work at Norfolk International Airport (discovered during a "sting" investigation), and an incident in August 2006 when he was caught carrying a loaded Glock 32 chambered in .357 SIG into the Newport News/Williamsburg International Airport terminal. In February 2007, "C.J." Reamon and Vick were together when Vick was charged with a minor fishing boat sticker violation in Norfolk's Western Branch Reservoir by a Virginia game warden.

ESPN reported that, very shortly after the initial raid in late April, Vick "threw Taylor off the Surry property" and listed it with real estate agents for sale. The 15-acre (61,000 m^{2}) property includes a large brick house painted white, a small swimming pool, and a basketball court. Four outbuildings painted black are located in the woods. It was reported by the local news media as under a sales contract for approximately 50% of its assessed value within a day or so of listing. However, according to published reports, as of July 6 no transfer papers had been filed with the county clerk where deeds are recorded.

== Local investigation, search challenged by cousin ==
During the subsequent weeks, Surry County Sheriff Harold D. Brown and Commonwealth's Attorney (local prosecutor) Gerald G. Poindexter repeatedly responded to media inquiries with assurances that they were proceeding carefully with the investigation and any prosecutions and that anyone "whoever they are" who evidence indicates had acted unlawfully will be charged. According to the Code of Virginia (3.1–796.124), illegal activities relating to dog fighting (or supporting it) are felony offenses under Virginia laws. Other Virginia criminal statutes also prohibit gambling, which has also been alleged against Vick by an ESPN source who claimed to have seen Vick bet as much as $40,000 on the outcome of a single dog fight. On May 31, when asked by a news reporter for WAVY-TV whether there was evidence that placed Vick at dog fights, Poindexter replied "Yes".

On June 7, Boddie, who had recently moved from Surry County to Newport News, conducted interviews with news reporters from local television stations and the Newport News Daily Press newspaper in front of the nightclub in Hampton where one of his arrests had taken place. He alleged a conspiracy by authorities dating from 2001, claiming the amount of marijuana he admits having on April 20 was not justification for the search warrant of his Surry County residence, an opinion local prosecutors from several different jurisdictions took strong objection to, according to the Daily Press on June 8. Boddie accused authorities of being dishonest regarding the quantity of drugs he had and whether he was in possession of a firearm when arrested on April 20, claiming that the authorities will do anything to make "[him] and [his] peeps [people] look bad".

== Federal investigation assisted by state police revealed ==
Speech by Senator Robert Byrd made to U.S. Senate following the indictment of Michael Vick on federal dog fighting charges

Following weeks of increasing reports in the news media of Vick's involvement and new evidence and witnesses reportedly coming forward to authorities, according to USA Today, on June 7, federal authorities, assisted by the Virginia State Police, revealed their own investigation, and began an additional search of the property. Surry County Commonwealth's Attorney Poindexter told USA Today that an official of the U.S. Department of Agriculture's Office of the Inspector General, notifying him by telephone about 3 PM EDT on June 7, also advised him that the local authorities loved what he did, but were free to continue their own ongoing investigation. News media reports on WAVY-TV at 11 PM that evening placed Poindexter at the Vick home and property, apparently observing the search. Federal authorities, assisted by Virginia State Police, conducted an additional search on July 6, as reported by multiple news media sources. Federal and state police officials had not issued any public statements as of that time.

== Federal court filings and additional search ==
Documents filed in federal court in Richmond on July 2 and obtained by the Associated Press under the Freedom of Information Act outline an extensive multi-state dog fighting enterprise named "Bad Newz Kennels" which was allegedly operating from the Vick property since at least 2002. For the events, participants and dogs traveled from South Carolina, North Carolina, Maryland, New York, Texas and other states. At least three people are expected to be indicted. On July 7, the Free-Lance Star newspaper based in Fredericksburg, Virginia noted that on Vick's website, he lists his birthplace as Newport News, "a.k.a. BadNews". The same day, The Atlanta Constitution noted that the Urban Dictionary lists "Bad Newz" as the street name for Newport News. WAVY-TV (Portsmouth, Virginia) posted a copy of one of the federal court document from July 2, and has made it available online at WAVY-TV online copy of a July 2 document obtained under a Freedom of Information request about the "Bad Newz Kennels" interstate dog fighting investigation.

== Status of investigations, charges ==
=== Federal ===
==== July 2 filings ====
The federal court filings of July 2 alleged that Vick's property was used as the "main staging area for housing and training the pit bulls involved in the dog fighting venture". A source close to the investigation told ESPN's Len Pasquarelli that the events of Friday [July 6] were "very helpful in the overall and ongoing investigation into an alleged dogfighting ring at that property. ... Remember, this is an investigation into what has been considered an enterprise involving many people ... From our standpoint, it never has focused on an individual and it still doesn't."

==== July 17 indictments ====
On July 17, a federal grand jury indicted Vick and 3 others on multiple counts, stating that Vick and three other men spent six years "knowingly sponsoring and exhibiting in an animal fighting venture". Almost immediately, speculation began regarding Vick's future in the NFL.

The grand jury also charged the men with establishing a kennel to represent dogfighting competitions, purchase and train pitbulls in dogfighting competitions and "destroying or otherwise disposing of dogs not selected to stay with the ongoing animal fighting venture". The case was assigned to Henry E. Hudson in the U.S. District Court in Richmond.

According to an ESPN attorney, a new "tough" federal law passed by the U.S. Congress in April 2007 and signed by President George W. Bush on May 3, 2007, was being used in many ongoing investigations of dog fighting around the country. However, Vick and his codefendants were charged under the older laws, which carry lower penalties. Vick and his codefendants each faced $350,000 in fines and six years in prison if convicted of the federal charges. (On the Travel Act portion of the conspiracy charges, he faced a maximum of five years in prison and a $250,000 fine. The dogfighting charges carried a possible sentence of one year in prison, a $100,000 fine, or both.)

==== Vick's codefendants ====
The Virginian-Pilot reported that the other three men indicted were longtime associates of property-owner Vick, who was also known to members of the alleged conspiracy as "Ookie" according to the federal indictment:

- Purnell A. Peace (also known as "P-Funk" or "Funk") is a cousin of Tony Taylor. He had drug-related convictions in the 1990s. He called the Surry County Sheriff's Office in May 2007 to report a break-in and theft of furniture at Vick's Moonlight Road property. With his residence listed as Virginia Beach, media sources have published no information about him beyond that contained in the federal indictments and the break-in report from May.
- Quanis L. Phillips (also known as "Q") played football with Vick in high school in Newport News. The federal indictment claims that he, along with Vick and defendant Tony Taylor, purchased four pit bull puppies for approximately $1,000 in September 2001 from someone in Williamsburg, Virginia. He was listed as a contact to call to buy a dog on a website (no longer active) for "Vicks' K9 Kennels", which apparently operated from the Surry property. The website, no longer active, said it bred pit bulls but "was not involved with dogfighting". That website was linked to MV7 LLC, a company affiliated with Vick. The Atlanta Journal-Constitution identified Phillips as one of Vick's employees with MV7 LLC in an article about marketing shoes. On the now-defunct website, Phillips was listed as the person to contact about purchasing dogs. His criminal background includes a 1997 arrest for possession of stolen property and a guilty plea in 1999 to misdemeanor possession with intent to distribute marijuana. In October 2000, he was convicted in Newport News of violating drug control act, sentenced to one month in jail and fined, and also convicted of contempt of court and sentenced to five days in jail. In May 2001, he was convicted in Newport News of possession of marijuana with intent to distribute, and fined.
- Tony Taylor (also known as "T") came to Newport News after serving two years in prison for drug trafficking in New York, according to published report in The Atlanta Journal-Constitution. He found the property at 1915 Moonlight Road in Surry County to establish a place to house and train the pit bulls, authorities said. Court documents show he also helped purchase four pit bulls in September 2001. In 2002, the documents show, he apparently executed at least two dogs that did not perform well in test fights. He was listed as the registered agent for MV7 LLC, a company named after Vick's initials and his jersey number, when it organized in June 2002 at the Moonlight Road address. ESPN reported that the Treasurer of Surry County had issued a license which was valid in April for a kennel and for the breeding of dogs on Vick's property to Tony Taylor. Taylor was arrested in Newport News on a cocaine possession charge in 1996; it was dismissed after he completed a substance-abuse program and following one year of good behavior. In 2000, a City of Suffolk judge issued bench warrant for his arrest after he failed to appear on charges of reckless driving and driving on suspended license. In 2004, a veterinary clinic in Smithfield obtained a $145.50 civil judgment against Taylor in Isle of Wight County General District Court.

==== Detention and arraignment hearing, bail conditions ====
On July 26, all four pleaded not guilty to all of the charges against them during a hearing before Judge Hudson at the Lewis F. Powell Jr. U.S. Courthouse in Richmond, and a trial date was set for November 26. USA Today reported that all four defendants were released without bond, but among the pre-trial conditions imposed on Vick by U.S. Magistrate Dennis Dohnal in a separate hearing held the same day was that he surrender any dog breeding or kennel licenses he may have. All four defendants were required to be under active supervision of the court, surrender their passports, refrain from travel outside their immediate area without prior approval, and stay away from dogs, guns, and each other. Peace, Phillips and Taylor were required to undergo random drug tests, but not Vick, as he had no prior convictions at the time. Peace and Phillips were also required to submit to electronic monitoring via ankle bracelets. Taylor was ordered to undergo substance abuse evaluation and treatment.

==== Superseding indictment plans announced ====
Federal prosecutors announced plans to file a superseding indictment by the end of August. According to a representative of the U.S. District Court, a superseding indictment could mean new charges and possibly new defendants in the case. ESPN legal analyst Lester Munson predicted that, given the reputation of Richmond's federal prosecutors, Vick would face more federal charges. Munson also believes that the threat of a superseding indictment is intended to make the defendants plead guilty and cooperate with the government.

The two hearings took a total of 25 minutes, which is typical for a court popularly known as "the rocket docket" for the speed with which proceedings are conducted. It was unclear whether the same bail arrangements would also apply to additional federal charges, should any result from the superseding indictment anticipated next month, or whether additional state charges would violate the terms of the bail.

==== Vick prepared statement ====
Afterwards, Vick issued a prepared statement through his lawyer, his first public comment since the indictment, in which he proclaimed his innocence, but apologized to his mother and his teammates. The terms of his bail theoretically left Vick free to play until the trial, provided he got permission from the court to travel outside the immediate area of his primary residence. However, Atlanta Falcons owner Arthur Blank stated that Vick had to give up any thoughts of playing until the case is resolved.

==== Taylor pleads guilty, submits "Summary of the Facts" ====
On July 30, Tony Taylor entered a guilty plea before Judge Henry E. Hudson at the U.S. District Court in Richmond. Taylor, 34, said he was not promised any specific sentence in return for his cooperation with the government. The Roanoke Times reported that Judge Hudson asked Taylor: "You're pleading guilty and taking your chances, right?" and "You have agreed to cooperate fully with the United States, is that right?" Taylor responded to each question, "Yes." Hudson set sentencing for December 14.

According to The Washington Post, in the "Summary of the Facts" filed along with the plea and signed by Taylor, he admitted that he helped start "Bad Newz Kennels" with Vick and two other co-defendants in 2001 and participated fully in the enterprise before leaving in September 2004 after a disagreement with Phillips "and others".

Taylor's statement says the dogfighting ring's operations and gambling money "were almost exclusively funded by Vick". It also says Vick paid more than $30,000 to purchase the property near Smithfield, Virginia, where the house and outbuildings for training fighting dogs were built as the home of Bad Newz Kennels.

The Norfolk Virginian-Pilot newspaper noted that Taylor's plea document described eight matches that he says Vick attended or sponsored between late 2002 and 2004, with dogs named Jane, Big Boy, Zebro, Magic, Tiny and Too Short. The group put the name "Bad Newz Kennels" to the operation in early 2002, according to the document. "At one point, the defendants obtained shirts and headbands representing and promoting their affiliation with 'Bad Newz Kennels'", the summary says.

The newspaper made a copy of the entire 13-page "Summary of Facts" submitted with Taylor's plea and obtained under the Freedom of Information Act. The specific language that Vick provided almost all the funds and participated in the "ongoing criminal enterprise" in the plea documents fueled speculation by legal experts that Vick would face federal racketeering charges under the powerful Racketeer Influenced and Corrupt Organizations Act. There had already been talk that the government might seek a RICO indictment, based on the specific "continuing criminal enterprise" language in the original indictment and in Taylor's plea agreement. A key element of proving racketeering is the existence of a "criminal enterprise", and gambling is an indictable offense under RICO. RICO is relatively easy to prove in court, as it focuses on patterns of criminal behavior. If Vick had been charged under RICO, he would have faced penalties of up to 20 years in prison and pay treble damages.

==== Other co-defendants also to plead guilty; Vick weighs options ====
On August 17, Vick's other two co-defendants, Peace and Phillips, had also agreed to plead guilty under their own plea agreements during consecutive hearings in judge Hudson's court.

News media reported widely that Vick had been given until that date (August 17) to decide whether to seek a plea bargain; otherwise, he would face a superseding indictment that would include at least two more federal charges. According to one of his public relations specialists, Vick was weighing all of his options with his legal team.

The Richmond Times-Dispatch reported on August 15 that a federal grand jury in Richmond was to begin hearing new allegations against Vick stemming from the dogfighting case beginning the week of August 20. Munson suggested that Peace and Phillips' guilty pleas put Vick in a "legal checkmate", as their testimony, added to the other five potential witnesses the prosecutors already had, made it very difficult for Vick's legal team to establish reasonable doubt in court.

According to the Journal-Constitution, Vick's legal team began talks with federal prosecutors regarding a possible plea agreement soon after Vick's co-defendants pleaded guilty. A spokesman for Vick's legal team said that the co-defendants' pleas took them by surprise.

ESPN reported that another sticking point in the plea negotiations was the wording of the allocution Vick would have to make. He would have to make a detailed statement as to the extent of his involvement in the operation, such as the specific methods he used to kill the dogs.

On August 17, Peace and Phillips appeared before Judge Hudson at the U.S. District Court in Richmond. They entered their guilty pleas, plea agreements, and related statement of facts documentation. They also agreed to testify if the government requested it from them. Phillips' bail was revoked due to failing a drug test.

Peace and Phillips were told that because of the "victimization and execution of pit bull dogs" described in court filings, "upward departure" from the sentencing guidelines is "necessary in this case". The aggravating factors will be taken into consideration at sentencing, which means they could face harsher punishments at their sentencing on November 30.

The documents filed with the court and obtained by the news media under the provisions of the U.S. Freedom of Information Act provided confirmation of portions of that contained in Taylor's earlier plea agreement and also gave more detail of co-defendant Vick's roles. Copies were made available by the Newport News Daily Press at:

- Summary of Facts from Quanis Phillips' plea agreement (PDF, 12 pages)
- Summary of Facts from Purnell Peace's plea agreement (PDF, 12 pages)
- Purnell Peace's plea agreement (PDF, 12 pages)

Co-defendant Quanis Phillips was incarcerated earlier after his August 17 plea hearing because he had failed drug tests with monitoring equipment and regulations already in place.

==== Vick pleads guilty ====
On August 20, 2007, Vick pleaded guilty to the federal felony dogfighting conspiracy charge. Vick's lawyer Billy Martin released this statement:

After consulting with his family over the weekend, Michael Vick has asked that I announce today that he has reached an agreement with federal prosecutors regarding charges pending against him. Mr. Vick has agreed to enter a plea of guilty to those charges and to accept full responsibility for his actions and the mistakes he has made. Michael wishes to apologize again to everyone who has been hurt by this matter.

On August 24, 2007, it was announced that Vick had signed a plea agreement and issued a statement admitting his participation and funding of the dogfighting ring but maintaining that he did not place any bets or take any prize money.

Details of Vick's plea agreement was made available when filed with the court on August 24. USA Today made copies available over the Internet in PDF files at:

- Vick plea agreement 8-24-2007
- Vick summary of facts 8-24-2007

On August 27, Vick appeared before Judge Hudson and submitted the guilty plea. In the scheduled December 10 sentencing, Vick faced a maximum of five years in prison, a fine of $250,000 and three years of supervised release. Prosecutors asked Hudson to sentence Vick to 12–18 months if Vick cooperated with the government as he had agreed to do in the terms of the original plea agreement. The terms of the plea agreement include a clause in which Vick forfeits his right to appeal any sentence imposed upon him. Though prosecutors asked for a lower-end sentence for Vick, Hudson could still increase the sentence up to the maximum limits; Hudson had informed two co-defendants that the brutality warranted exceeding the guidelines in their cases.

A significant portion of the plea agreement involved Vick cooperating with federal authorities pursuing other dog fighting cases and a complete allocution on his role in the Bad Newz Kennels, including detailing his role in the killing of dogs after the fights. The allocution proved to be a "sticking point," as both federal prosecutors and FBI agents reported that Vick was giving contradictory statements about how dogs were killed, what his role in the killings were, how many dogs were killed, and other details. According to reporters who spoke to Hudson after the sentencing, Vick's pre-sentencing behavior, especially during an FBI polygraph administered in October 2007 which showed that Vick was being deceptive when asked direct questions about killing dogs, was a factor in selecting the length of the sentence.

==== Sentencing ====
On November 30, Peace and Phillips were sentenced by Judge Hudson to 18 and 21 months in federal prison respectively. The punishments were higher than recommended by federal prosecutors and included three years of supervised probation following their release from prison. Taylor, like Peace and Phillips, had agreed to testify against Vick at trial before he also accepted a plea agreement. He was given a two month sentence in December 2007.

News media reported that statements regarding the November 30 hearing made it clearer that co-defendant Tony Taylor led Bad Newz Kennels. He guided others who were newcomers to the dogfighting underworld, according to arguments presented in U.S. District Court during the sentencing hearings. An attorney for Phillips argued before Judge Hudson that Taylor was known as "the dog man" as "an experienced dogfighter and trainer."

At the time of the November 30 hearings for Peace and Phillips, Vick was being held at Northern Neck Regional Jail in Warsaw, Virginia awaiting sentencing on the federal convictions and his April 2, 2008, trial on the Virginia state charges.

Vick was sentenced to 23 months in prison on the federal charges on December 10, 2007. Tony Taylor, who was the first to plead guilty, received a sentence of 60 days in jail on December 14, 2007, which was within the sentencing guidelines for no more than 6 months in prison. Allen, who sold some of the dogs used in the operation, received probation on January 25, 2008.

Taylor was released from federal prison on March 20, 2008, with 9 days of time off for good behavior.

==== Disposition of property ====
The property used in the operation, 1915 Moonlight Road, has been purchased by Dogs Deserve Better, Inc., and is a dog rehabilitation center for chained and penned canines. It is known as the Good Newz Rehab Center, playing on the former tenant's name.

=== State ===
==== Investigation ====
As of August 18, possible additional state charges were still under investigation. Part-time Commonwealth's Attorney Gerald G. Poindexter and Sheriff Harold D. Brown in the county had been criticized for slowness, particularly by the investigative news reports of WAVY-TV, the NBC affiliate in Hampton Roads. In response, they have indicated "doing it right" was more a priority than speed, and that they are continuing to cooperate with federal authorities.

According to an ESPN attorney, under Virginia law, Vick can be prosecuted if the authorities can show that he was "aware" of dogfighting activities on his property. According to that attorney, "If it is proved that the fighting took place, it will be difficult for Vick to persuade anyone that he didn't know about it." According to other news media reports, Surry County investigators have spoken to as many as 30 people. In June, Sheriff's Department Deputy W.R. Brinkman, the lead local investigator, said he had "more people to talk to." Sheriff Harold D. Brown stated in an interview published on June 28 ..."we need to find out, if he's one of the big players or not."

Following the federal indictments of July 17, local authorities in Surry County said they could possibly prosecute different crimes than those charged in the federal indictment. Poindexter and Brown said they are continuing to cooperate with federal authorities. Both Brown and Poindexter told news media that they were taken aback by the level of detail in the indictments, especially mention of dogs allegedly being executed by hanging, drowning and electrocution. "That's revealing to me. I didn't know anything about that," said Poindexter, according to the Richmond Times-Dispatch. Poindexter said he thought most people in the county didn't know about the alleged fights. "It's an underground, well-guarded crime," he said. He also noted that he has also learned a great deal about dog fighting recently which he hadn't known before.

Although the federal investigation and charges placed drew most publicity in July and August 2007, the local investigation and consideration of charges under violations of state laws were also continuing. Plea bargains with federal prosecutors would have no official standing in the local case. Double jeopardy concepts would not apply to state and federal overlapping cases. The county grand jury would be the group which would typically consider felony indictments presented by a local prosecutor under state laws.

On July 24, Brown stated that he felt certain state indictments for additional charges in Virginia would be returned by a local grand jury during session which begins September 25. However, no individuals have been named as target(s) to date. Until August 17, there had also been no indication of how many charges might be presented to the grand jury in Surry County. Over 50 dogs were seized, in addition to carcasses recovered, and a number of the interstate fight events, all with attendant gambling activities, were allegedly hosted at Vick's Surry County estate.

On August 17, Surry County Commonwealth's Attorney Gerald Poindexter told WVEC-TV that the admissions contained in the federal plea agreements filed by Purnell Peace and Quanis Phillips were "a road map to indictments in Surry County." The plea agreements implicate all four men, Peace, Phillips, Taylor and Vick in both dog fighting and the killing of dogs. It had been noted in earlier media reports that one of the agreements states that eight dogs were killed jointly by Peace, Phillips and Vick in April 2007 (prior to the April 25 search).

Poindexter told the WVEC news reporter that he's looking at two felony counts: dogfighting and killing of a companion animal. The maximum sentence in Virginia for each charge is five years. "We believed we had evidence and this is the first time someone's admitted to it. It's sad and outrageous. It's gruesome." he added. It was also not clear whether any state prison sentence(s) would be allowed run concurrently with any federal time or would be served consecutively. ESPN reported on August 18 that Vick could face up to 40 years in prison under state laws.

==== State Indictments ====
Following guilty pleas in the federal case, Vick, Taylor, Peace, and Phillips were indicted on state felony charges relating to dog fighting under state laws by after indictments were returned by a local grand jury in Surry County, Virginia in September 2007.

Vick faced two felony counts under state laws and his jury trial in Surry County Circuit Court was to have begun on April 2, 2008. The maximum penalty if convicted on the state charges would be 10 years in prison. His co-defendants were also assigned trial dates. Purnell Peace was scheduled to face a jury trial March 5, 2008, as was Quanis Phillips, but did not ask for a jury trial. Tony Taylor, currently not in custody, was to have been tried on May 7. The trials of all four, however, were pushed back until Vick, Peace, and Philips were released from prison, because of costs associated with transportation to Virginia state courts (Taylor's trial is also delayed until the other defendants have finished their prison terms).

Vick, the last to plead guilty to federal charges, pleaded guilty to state charges on November 25, 2008, paying a $2,500 fine as a result and court fees. The fine would only be paid if Vick fails to stay out of trouble for four years.

Michael Vick pleaded guilty to dog fighting on November 25, 2008, and received a three-year suspended sentence and was ordered to pay restitution of $3,636.97. Pernell Peace pleaded guilty to dog fighting on March 24, 2009, and received a three-year suspended sentence. Anthony "Tony" Taylor pleaded guilty to dog fighting on March 24, 2009, and received a two-year suspended sentence. Quantis Phillips pleaded guilty to dog fighting on May 6, 2009, and received a three-year suspended sentence.

== Disposition of the dogs ==
As of October 2, 2007, the 49 dogs which were seized in April remained in animal shelters in Hampton Roads and central Virginia. An ASPCA evaluation showed that one animal, identified as #2621, was aggressive to the point the evaluation could not be completed and had a history of biting people; U.S. District Judge Henry Hudson ordered that it be euthanized. The U.S. Attorney's Office in Richmond announced in court filings that the other 48 canines may be safe enough to place in the community with strict conditions.

On October 16, Hudson acted on a government motion requesting animal law expert Rebecca J. Huss, who is a Professor of Law at Valparaiso University School of Law in Indiana, to serve as the guardian-special master to oversee the possible placement of the 48 dogs, or their euthanasia. The judge also granted a request by the U.S. attorney's office that each of the pit bulls be spayed or neutered and have microchips implanted. In a statement released by Valparaiso University, she said: "As someone whose academic endeavors focus on the legal status and value of animals in our lives, I am honored to represent the interests of those at the heart of this case, the dogs."

In November 2007, Vick was observed to be liquidating some of his real estate assets, notably the dog-fighting estate property near Smithfield, Virginia and one of his multimillion-dollar homes which are located in Suffolk, Virginia, near Atlanta, Georgia, and the South Beach section of Miami Beach, Florida. ESPN reported on October 20 that the one near Atlanta was listed for sale at a $4.5 million asking price. At the request of federal authorities before his sentencing in federal court, he agreed to deposit nearly $1 million in an escrow account with attorneys for use to reimburse costs of caring for the confiscated dogs, most of which are now being offered for adoption on a selective basis under supervision of a court-appointed specialist. Experts say some of the animals will require individual care for the rest of their lives.

On July 8, 2008, an article was published by The Washington Post reporting on the status of the dogs. At the time of the article, two of the seized dogs had been euthanized – one for aggression, as mentioned previously, and one due to health problems. Of the 47 remaining dogs, 22 were sent to an animal sanctuary at the Best Friends Animal Society in Utah because of aggression toward other dogs, and 25 were placed in foster care. Several of the latter have been adopted. The dogs and therapists were featured in a DogTown episode entitled "DogTown: Saving the Michael Vick Dogs" on the National Geographic Channel. The newspaper again profiled the dogs in September 2019. The article revealed that 11 of the dogs were still alive and how the dogfighting investigation was a watershed moment for animal welfare.

A program on WHYY in September 2010 covered the disposition of the Michael Vick dogs. One of the participants in the program was Jim Gorant who has written a book about the dogs called The Lost Dogs: Michael Vick's Dogs and Their Tale of Rescue and Redemption.

In December 2021, Frodo, the last of the 47 dogs rescued from Vick's dogfighting operation died at the age of 15, only a few days after the death of another dog, Jonny Justice.

== Defenders of Vick ==
Numerous athletes generated additional controversy by making public comments supporting and defending Vick. Stephon Marbury, a point guard for the New York Knicks, called dogfighting a sport and compared it to hunting and said that a similar reaction does not occur when other animals die. Roy Jones Jr., a prominent boxer, stated, "really two dogs fighting can happen in anyone's backyard or on the street. It happened in my backyard, two of my dogs fought and one died." Clinton Portis, a star running back on the Washington Redskins, stated, "I don't know if he was fighting dogs or not, but it's his property, it's his dog. If that's what he wants to do, do it. I think people should mind their own business." Deion Sanders, a former star football and baseball player and current head coach of the Colorado Buffaloes, stated, "Why are we indicting him? Was he the ringleader? Is he the big fish? Or is there someone else? The fights allegedly occurred at a property that he purchased for a family member. They apparently found carcasses on the property, but I must ask you again, is he the ringleader? This situation reminds me of a scene in the movie New Jack City when drug dealer Nino Brown is on the witness stand and eloquently says, 'This thing is bigger than me.' Are we using Vick to get to the ringleader? Are we using him to bring an end to dogfighting in the United States? The only thing I can gather from this situation is that we're using Vick."

== Public comments about dogfighting, animal abuse ==
During the furor arising around the Bad Newz Kennels investigation and prosecutions, even such diverse notables as hip-hop mogul Russell Simmons and the Reverend Al Sharpton joined with the Humane Society of the United States (HSUS) and PETA – People for the Ethical Treatment of Animals in calling for strong stands against animal cruelty, jointly stating:

Today, we sound a clarion call to all people: Stand up for what is right, and speak out against what is wrong. Dogfighting is unacceptable. Hurting animals for human pleasure or gain is despicable. Cruelty is just plain wrong.

Major League Baseball pitcher Mark Buehrle of the Chicago White Sox commented that he hoped Vick would get injured after he was reinstated to football. Buehrle, an animal rights activist, told MLB.com "he had a great year and a great comeback, but there were times where we watched the game, and I know it's bad to say, but there were times where we hope he gets hurt...everything you've done to these dogs, something bad needs to happen to these guys."

== Endorsements and products ==
Companies employing Vick for endorsements and producing or selling Vick-related products reacted to the negative publicity soon after the federal indictments. According to the Norfolk Virginian-Pilot, Nike was Vick's biggest endorsement deal. The company initially announced in July that it had "suspended Michael Vick's contract without pay, and will not sell any more Michael Vick product at Nike owned retail at this time", although the company said it had not terminated the contract, apparently waiting for a guilty plea or a conviction to do so, as animal-rights activists had urged the company to do. However, Nike also announced it was suspending the release of the Zoom Vick V, a new line of shoes. On August 24, hours after details of Vick's guilty plea and statement of facts were made public, Nike announced it was completely terminating its relationship with him. Adidas announced its Reebok division would stop selling Vick football jerseys. The NFL said it had pulled all Vick-related items from NFLShop.com. Trading card companies including Donruss and Upper Deck soon followed with similar actions. St. Louis-based sporting goods manufacturer Rawlings, which used Vick's likeness to sell merchandise and modeled a football using his name, ended its relationship. The same day, The Atlanta Journal-Constitution reported that Dick's Sporting Goods and Sports Authority stores have also stopped selling Vick-related goods.

Some fans of the Atlanta Falcons donated their Vick-related jerseys and shirts to the Atlanta Humane Society for use as animal bedding and cleaning rags. Others produced dog chew toys in Vick's effigy.

In 2014 Nike re-signed Michael Vick to an endorsement deal, and in early 2015 Vick confirmed reports that his signature line of Nike sneakers would be returning.

== See also ==
- NFL player conduct policy
- Dog fighting in the United States
