= Nick White (dog trainer) =

American dog trainer

- Born: Urbana, Ohio
- Occupations: Owner of Off Leash K9 Training, dog behavior specialist
- Known for: Dog training

Nick White is a celebrity dog trainer, author, and a veteran of the United States Marines Corps. White also published Raising the Perfect Dog: Secrets of Law Enforcement K9 Trainers.

After his military service in Fallujah, White worked as a celebrity bodyguard and then joined the Secret Service as a bodyguard. Since 2010, White has owned and operated Off-Leash K9 Training in Woodbridge, Virginia.

== Biography ==
White was born in Urbana, Ohio and trained the family's German Shepherd to do basic tricks. His unit was one of the first to enter Fallujah during Operation Phantom Fury and relied heavily on specially trained dogs to sniff out bombs, contraband, and enemy combatants.

After his service, White's security details for the Secret Service included Presidents George W. Bush, Barack Obama, and Vice-president Dick Cheney. While in the US Secret Service, he then started training dogs for private clients on the side. He did demonstrations in dog parks and advertised in local trade magazines, eventually leaving the Secret Service in 2010 to open Off Leash K9 Training.

White's clients include private dog owners, military and law enforcement professionals, athletes, and entertainers.

White was also on the board for the Prince William County Humane Society and helped establish their Warrior Buddies Program which pairs shelter dogs with returning war veterans, free-of-charge. White is also the host of A&E's upcoming show "America's Top Dog" as the expert trainer for the show.
