= Dog sex =

Dog sex may refer to:

- Sexual behavior of dogs
- Canine reproduction, a social behavior of the domestic dog
- Dog breeding, the practice of mating selected specimens with the intent to maintain or produce specific qualities and characteristics
- Doggy style, a group of sexual positions of humans
- Zoophilia, the practice of sex between humans and animals (bestiality)

== See also ==
- Dogging (sexual slang), a British euphemism for engaging in sexual acts in a semi-public place
