= Temperament test =

Dog evaluations

Temperament tests assess dogs for certain behaviors or suitability for dog sports or adoption from an animal shelter by observing the animal for unwanted or potentially dangerous behavioral traits, such as aggressiveness towards other dogs or humans, shyness, or extreme fear.

== AKC Temperament Test ==
In 2019, the American Kennel Club launched its AKC Temperament Test (ATT), a pass-fail evaluation by AKC licensed or member clubs. Evaluators are specially trained AKC Obedience judges, Rally judges and AKC Approved Canine Good Evaluators.

== American Temperament Test Society ==
American Temperament Test Society, Inc. was started by Alfons Ertel in 1977. Ertel created a test for dogs that checks a dog's reaction to strangers, to auditory and visual stimuli (such as the gun shot test), and to unusual situations in an outdoor setting; it does not test indoor or home situation scenarios. It favors a bold confident dog. As of 2017, the top three dog breeds that have tested with ATTS are Rottweiler (17% of all tests conducted), German Shepherd Dog (10%), and Doberman (5%). The test itself is copyrighted and prospective testers must apply to become official. The test is conducted as a pass-fail by majority rule of three testers, and each individual dog is graded according to its own breed's native aptitudes, taking into account the individual dog's age, health and training. Though the ATTS is the only organization which posts pass rates "by breed", the breeds cannot be compared against each other because the grades are based on each breed's own characteristics. Despite that, attorneys have been encouraged to use the ATTS published "results by breed" to defend their clients in dangerous dog cases by comparing pass rates of the breed of their client's dog against the pass rates of other well-known non-aggressive pet dog breeds. As of 2017, 34,686 tests have been completed; less than 1,000 per year.

== BH-VT test by FCI ==
BH-VT, an abbreviation of a German term which roughly translates to "companion dog test with traffic safety part", (Note: BH-VT — Begleithundeprüfung mit Verkehrssicherheitsteil (translation from German: Utility dog examination with traffic safety part)) is governed by rules from Fédération Cynologique Internationale (FCI). The BH-VT has become the prerequisite examination for entry into almost all dog sports in Europe that require off-leash work, such as Schutzhund/IPO/IGP, agility and flyball. It is not required for conformation shows where dogs are always on a leash.

Dogs must be at least 12 months old (older for some breeds). There are two portions: obedience and traffic. For the obedience portion, each of the following is part of the test: heeling on leash, heeling off leash, sit exercise, down with recall, and down under distraction. The traffic portion includes tests for encountering a group of people, bicyclists, cars, joggers, other dogs, and being tethered for a short period alone without its handler, and walking through a group of people that are moving.

Aggression towards other dogs is at all times forbidden in FCI events, and any bite or attempt to bite or attack a human or other dog will immediately disqualify a dog. Any aggression towards another dog will permanently disqualify a dog from any participation until it has proven itself through passing a repeat BH-VT with behavioral test. (Note: "A dog who, at any time during the competition (before, during or after his own performance) bites a person or another dog, tries to bite, attack or attempt to attack, is disqualified from the competition. All points are withdrawn and the dog is disqualified (DQ), even if the dog has completed all 3 phases. In a two-day event, the disqualification also extends to the second day so that the dog cannot start or continue in the trial. In cases of dog aggression, immediate disqualification (DQ) occurs. Before the dog may enter another trial, the dog owners / handler have to prove during an examination or at a competition that the team (dog) has again successfully participated in a BH-VT with behaviour test. The disqualification shall be entered by the performance judge in all the performance records / score books, pedigree known to him and signed by him. Entry: "Disqualification due to dog aggression, dog must be presented again in a BH-VT with behavioural test."")

An earlier version of the test was called simply "BH", and it was Schutzhund's preliminary test that all dogs must pass before going further in Schutzhund training. With the increase in (non-protection) dog sports for all breeds, the new BH-VT omits the "gun shy" test, which was instead moved to the next higher level of Schutzhund trials.

== Canine Good Citizen by AKC ==
The Canine Good Citizen by the American Kennel Club tests for good behavior in a companion dog. (Note: "The CGC test was designed to demonstrate that companion dogs could be trained to be trained to be accepted and respectable members of a community by behaving well in their homes, in public places, and in the presence of other dogs.") Over 1 million dogs and their owners have participated in CGC since it was started in 1989 (over 30,000 dogs per year).

== Puppy aptitude tests ==
There are numerous puppy aptitude and temperament tests which are used by buyers when selecting a puppy and by breeders when evaluating a litter of puppies.

== Shelter evaluations ==
Shelters use temperament tests to help identify dogs with problem behaviors, including aggression, and to help increase the rate of successful adoptions. For some, these tests are a way to determine if a dog should even be offered for adoption, or to whom they will restrict adoption of an individual dog (adult-only household or sanctuary only, versus family with children). In a time when shelters are trying to improve outcomes for shelter animals, some consider temperament tests to be controversial and result in too many dogs being labeled negatively, leading to euthanasia. As such, some shelters have discontinued using any form of testing for their dogs.

Such tests seek to assess a dog's manners, and its reaction to strangers, small children and other pets. The tests try to identify if a dog has problems with food aggression, resource guarding, or separation anxiety. Tools used for evaluations might include a leash, bowl of food, a lifelike doll, a fake arm, and dog treats or toys.

=== Assess-a-Pet and Assess-a-Hand ===
The Assess-a-Pet Temperament Test involves use of the Assess-a-Hand, a vinyl or latex mock hand and arm mounted on a wooden dowel, used to avoid bites to the tester who uses it to approach, pet, and then pull away a bowl or toy from the dog. The device was invented by Sue Sternberg. The test is typically given after a certain number of days at a shelter, with retesting after a failure, and additionally after resolution of illness.

=== Match-Up II Shelter Dog Rehoming Program ===
This test requires two people: a handler and a recorder. It has 11 sub-tests and the answers are placed in a computer program. It was designed to "help shelters learn about the personality and needs of each dog so that behavioral interventions can be implemented and successful matches can be made."

=== SAFER Test ===
SAFER (Safety Assessment for Evaluating Rehoming) by the ASPCA is used to "help identify the risk of future aggression and individual behavioral support needed before adoption for each dog in a shelter."

== Wolfhound testing ==
Temperament testing in wolfhounds is an old and proven form of mild dog fighting used in young dogs to test their temperament. For example, an American standard for an Irish Wolfhound is defined as "a large, rough-coated, greyhound-like dog, fast enough to catch a wolf and strong enough to kill it." It states that "the breed's well-being demands strong, gentle hounds, never aggressive or shy, not even "edgy" ones. Edgy hounds are presently under control, but without their handler's constant control would surely at least retreat, or perhaps manifest worse characteristics of the weak temperament."

Typically it is practiced with larger breeds known in Russia as волкодав (literally: dogs meant for the hunting of wolves). These large breeds (such as Caucasian Shepherd) in Russia undergo the testing called тестовые испытания волкодавов (i.e. testing/examination of dogs meant for hunting wolves). The breeders believe that males used for breeding have to have preserved fighting ability and dominant tendencies because it is a typical mark of their breed. They also believe that weak dogs without fighting abilities will cause a decrease in the quality of the breed.

As part of the test, breeders release two young dogs and let them behave naturally even if they begin to fight. If the fight looks dangerous, the breeders pull the dogs off each other to prevent their injury. If one of the participating dogs shows fear of the other dog and displays no dominant tendencies, he is removed from breeding to ensure his weak nature is not passed on to his descendants.

== See also ==
- Dog behavior
- Dog training
