= Pack (canine) =

Social group of conspecific canids

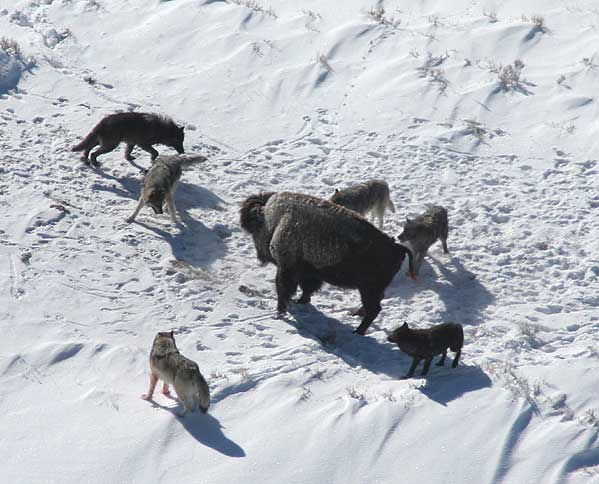
Wolf packs often work cooperatively, as in this bison hunt at Yellowstone National Park.

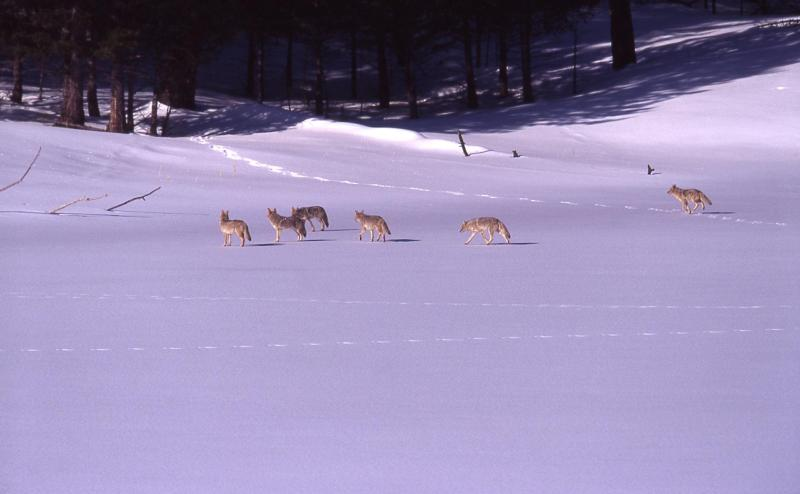
A pack of coyotes in Yellowstone National Park in 1999

A pack is a social group of conspecific canines. The number of members in a pack and their social behavior varies from species to species. Social structure is very important in a pack. Canine packs are led by a breeding pair.

== Pack behaviour in gray wolves ==
Cooperation is essential for tasks such as hunting and protecting the young, though the level of attachment present in the pack is not necessarily equal. The majority of wolves are known for dispersing from their birth pack; this makes measuring attachment behavior within the packs difficult. There are cases in which wolves leave their pack, typically when accompanying siblings of the same sex. This behaviour is suggested to be adaptive, which will benefit pack mates in future conflicts.

All individuals benefit from being a member of the wolf pack; the weak are supported by the efforts of stronger wolves, and higher-ranking individuals enjoy better and larger kills than could be taken on their own. Protection is granted by sheer number, and larger, more plentiful territory can be won and sustained. Care and protection of the young are shared, and knowledge can be passed down through generations, creating a unique culture within each group

The pack is typically a nuclear family unit. It often consists of 5–10 (though in areas of high prey abundance can be up to 30) mostly related individuals, specifically consisting of a typically unrelated breeding pair, their offspring, and occasionally a handful of other wolves which can be related or not. Membership may be fluid and is subject to change. Outside wolves may be shunned or, more rarely, accepted, depending on the specific circumstances. Genetic variability can become limited within such an interrelated group, and so conditions for gene flow must exist. Outside wolves can provide these opportunities. A pack may accept another wolf into their group if it is a distant relative, if reproduction rates are low due to the loss or infertility of an alpha, or if their numbers are significantly reduced.

Characterisation of wolves into dominance hierarchies of alpha, beta, and omega was based on behavioural studies of unrelated wolves in captivity, and this assemblage largely does not apply to natural wolf packs, which are familial units.

=== Wolves without packs ===
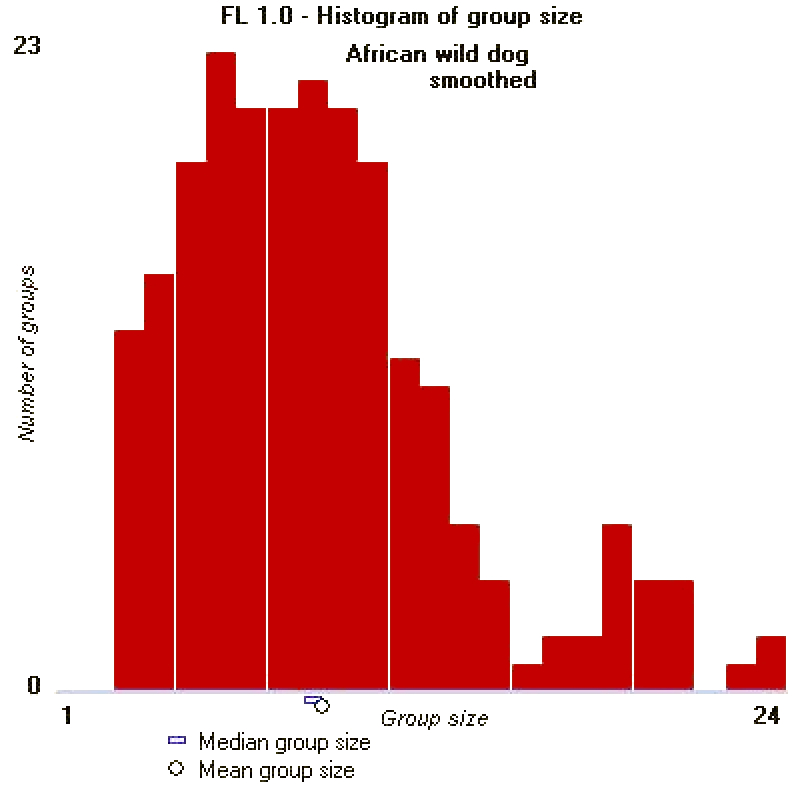
Pack size distribution of the African wild dog.

These singular outside wolves, often referred to as lone wolves, are vulnerable to food scarcity and territorial attacks and generally comprise less than 15% of the total wolf population. Lone wolves usually result from sexually mature offspring leaving their parental pack, though may also occur if harassed subordinates chose to disperse. In times of prey scarcity, low-ranking wolves may choose to go off on their own if the pack cannot supply sufficient food. These lone wolves may then attempt to join an existing wolf pack or, more commonly, find a mate and begin a new pack family as the alphas.

=== The breeding pair ("alphas") ===
Within the wolf pack, the breeding pair or the dominant breeding pair (in packs with multiple breeders), often referred to in familiar language as the "alpha pair" or the "alpha wolves", are typically the members of the family unit which breed and produce offspring; they are the matriarch and patriarch of the family. It was previously believed to be common for an aging or sick alpha to be replaced by one of their offspring, but more recent studies have shown this incestuous behaviour to be very rare.

=== The pups ===
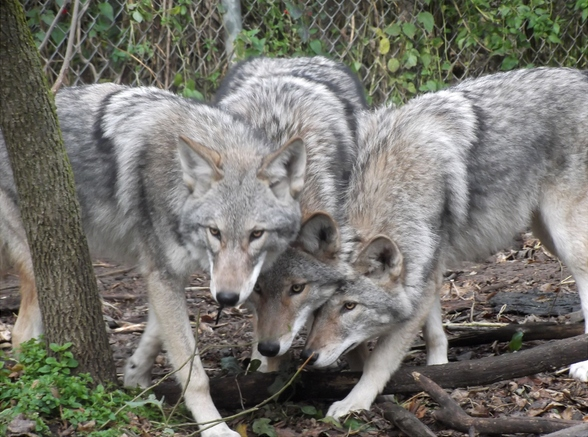
A small pack of captive coywolf hybrids

The importance of the alpha is rivalled only by that of the pups. The fundamental purpose of the pack is the successful production of offspring, and so raising the litter is a collaborative venture – all members contribute to their development. In times of scarcity, the breeding pair will often prioritise the care of the pups and preferentially feed the youngest wolves first. Despite this committed involvement, pup mortality is high, with researchers citing that only roughly 30% survive their first year of life. Those who survive, however, grow up with the added advantage of being surrounded by numerous caretakers and teachers. There exists a culture within wolf packs, and this is passed on to the offspring by the elders of the group. Pups learn something from each member of the pack and attain the vital social skills required to create powerful bonds upon which the wolf's societal structure relies.

== Pack behaviour in other species ==
African wild dogs (Lycaon pictus) live and hunt in packs. Males assist in raising the pups, and stay with their pack for life. The females leave their birth pack at approximately 2.5 years old to join another pack without females. Males outnumber the females in a pack. African wild dogs are not territorial, and hunt cooperatively in their packs. For example, they will run down large game and tear it apart with their pack. They also cooperate in caring for wounded, sick, and young pack members.

Black-backed jackals (Lupulella mesomelas) in Southern and Eastern Africa and coyotes (Canis latrans) in North America have a single long-term mate. As such, they usually hunt alone or in pairs. A pack consists of the breeding pair and their current young. They occasionally cooperate in larger packs to hunt big game, but rarely hunt animals larger than a small, young antelope. Black-backed jackals are not typically considered 'aggressive' towards larger animals but tend to be wary of humans. However, they will become aggressive if they feel threatened, in order to defend the boundaries of their territories.

Ethiopian wolves (Canis simensis) pack members hunt for rodents alone, and come together mainly to defend their territory from rival packs.

Bush dogs (Speothos venaticus) appear to be the most gregarious South American canid species. Although they can hunt alone, bush dogs are usually found in small packs, which consist of a single mated pair and their immediate relations, and have a home range of 3.8 to 10 square kilometres (1.5 to 3.9 sq mi). Packs can bring down much larger prey, including peccaries and rheas, and a pack of six dogs has even been reported hunting a 250 kg (550 lb) tapir, where they trailed the animal and nipped at its legs until it was felled. When hunting paca, part of the pack chases it on land and part wait for it in the water, where it often retreats.

Dholes (Cuon alpinus) live in clans rather than packs, but dhole clans frequently break into small packs of three to five animals, particularly during the spring season, as this is the optimal number for catching fawns.

Corsac foxes (Vulpes corsac) sometimes form packs, unlike some other fox species.

== Dominance and the "alpha wolf" ==
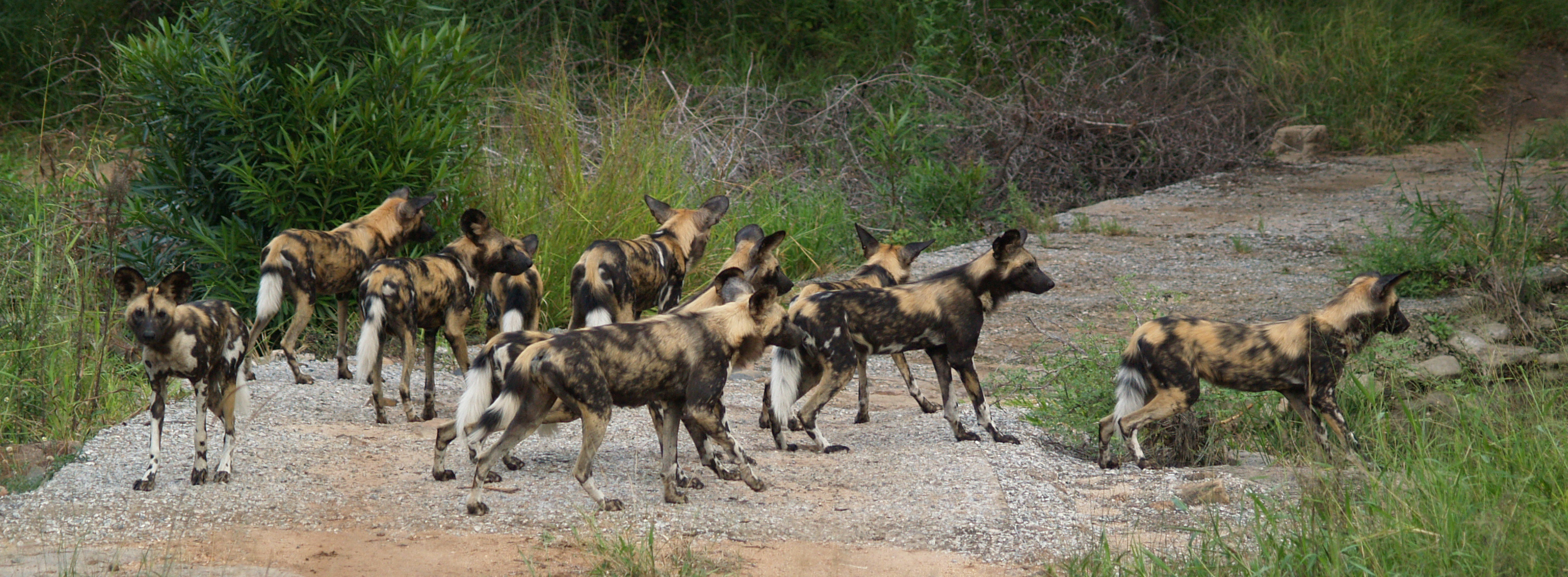
A hunting pack of African wild dogs

Animals that typically predominate over others are associated with the term alpha. Among pack-living wolves, alpha wolves are the genetic parents of most cubs in the pack. Such access to mating females creates strong selective pressure for intra-sex competition.

Wolves show deference to the alpha pair in their pack by allowing them to allocate the distribution of food, typically preferentially feeding the youngest wolves. Wolves use eye contact and posture as an indicator of dominance or submission, which are largely age-based; these postures are rare except concerning food, as described previously. The smaller and more nuclear a pack is, the less status of alpha is likely to be obtained through fighting, and young wolves instead leave the pack to find a mate and produce offspring of their own. Larger or less-nuclear packs may operate differently and possess more complex and flexible social structures.

In the case of other wild canids, the alpha male may not have exclusive access to the alpha female; moreover, other pack members may guard the maternity den used by the alpha female; as with the African wild dog, Lycaon pictus.

As dominant roles may be deemed normal among social species with extended parenting, it has been suggested that the additional term alpha is not required merely to describe dominance due to its ubiquity but should be reserved for where they are the predominant pack progenitor. For instance, wolf biologist L. David Mech stated:

...calling a wolf an alpha is usually no more appropriate than referring to a human parent or a doe deer as an alpha. Any parent is dominant to its young offspring, so alpha adds no information. Why not refer to an alpha female as the female parent, the breeding female, the matriarch, or simply the mother? Such a designation emphasizes not the animal's dominant status, which is trivial information, but its role as pack progenitor, which is critical information. The one use we may still want to reserve for alpha is in the relatively few large wolf packs comprised of multiple litters. ... In such cases, the older breeders are probably dominant to the younger breeders and perhaps can more appropriately be called the alphas. ... The point here is not so much the terminology but what the terminology falsely implies: a rigid, force-based dominance hierarchy.

The term alpha wolf originated from the observations of captive wolf packs, containing non-related wolves. Wolf packs in the wild are family based, with the dominant breeding pair usually being the parents of the other members of the pack. As a result, infighting for the dominant position is much rarer in wild wolf packs than was originally believed. Biologists now consider alpha wolf to be an outdated term and avoid its use.

=== Use in dog training ===
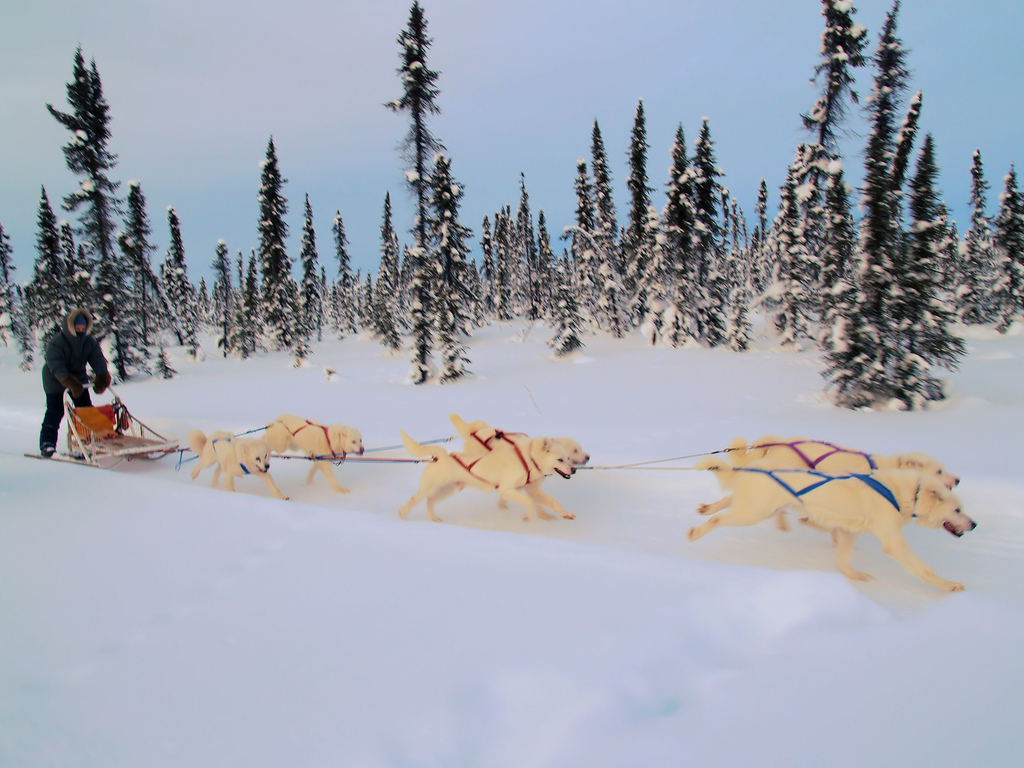
White Huskies dog sledding

One of the most persistent but disputed theories in dog training literature is the idea of the alpha wolf, an individual gray wolf who uses body language and, when needed, physical force to maintain dominance within the wolf pack. The idea was first reported in early wolf research. It was subsequently adopted by dog trainers. Later research has disputed the theory, pointing out that it was based on the behaviour of captive packs consisting of unrelated individuals, while in nature a pack is usually made up of members of a family.

The term alpha was popularised as early as 1976 in the dog training book How to Be Your Dog's Best Friend (Monks of New Skete), which introduced the idea of the alpha roll, a technique for punishing unwanted dog behaviours. Psychologist and dog trainer Stanley Coren wrote in the 2001 book How to Speak Dog, "You are the alpha dog... You must communicate that you are the pack leader and dominant".

It has been suggested that the use of such techniques may have more to do with human psychology than with dog behavior; "dominance hierarchies and dominance disputes and testing are a fundamental characteristic of all social groups... But perhaps only we humans learn to use punishment primarily to gain for ourselves the reward of being dominant.

Most leading veterinary and animal behaviour associations and most contemporary trainers would agree to advocate the use of rewards to teach commands and encourage good communication between owners and their pets. Many modern practices dictate the abandonment of outdated "pack" methods. Some canine behaviourists suggest that kind, efficient training uses games to teach commands which can be utilised to benefit the owner's everyday life.

== See also ==
- Pack hunter
- Dog behavior
