= Littermate syndrome =

Purported behavioral condition in dogs

Littermate syndrome (sometimes referred to as littermate dependency) is a blanket term for a variety of behavioral problems in dogs that are attributed to their being raised alongside other dogs of the same age (regardless of whether they are actually from the same litter). The existence of littermate syndrome is disputed.

Behaviors which have been connected to littermate syndrome include leash reactivity, fear aggression, neophobia, and separation anxiety relative to the other dog, as well as aggression towards each other and towards their owner.

The American Kennel Club posits that littermate syndrome is the result of puppies "bond[ing] more closely with each other than with [their owner]", arguing that they will distract each other during training and thereby mutually impede their socialization.

A 2019 article in the Journal of the International Association of Animal Behavior Consultants argues that there is no scientific evidence of littermate syndrome existing, only anecdotal, and that the syndrome's various aspects all have different causes, including poor management of the dogs' environment, and insufficient opportunities for behavioral enrichment; as well, the article emphasizes that many dogs are raised alongside their siblings without the occurrence of littermate syndrome, and further suggests that the label "syndrome" may wrongly give the impression that the behavioral problems are irremediable.

Biologist and ethologist Marc Bekoff has declared it to be a "myth", specifying that while the relevant behaviors may be real, the overall phenomenon is "rare enough not to warrant being called a syndrome".
