= Dog aggression =

Behavior in dogs

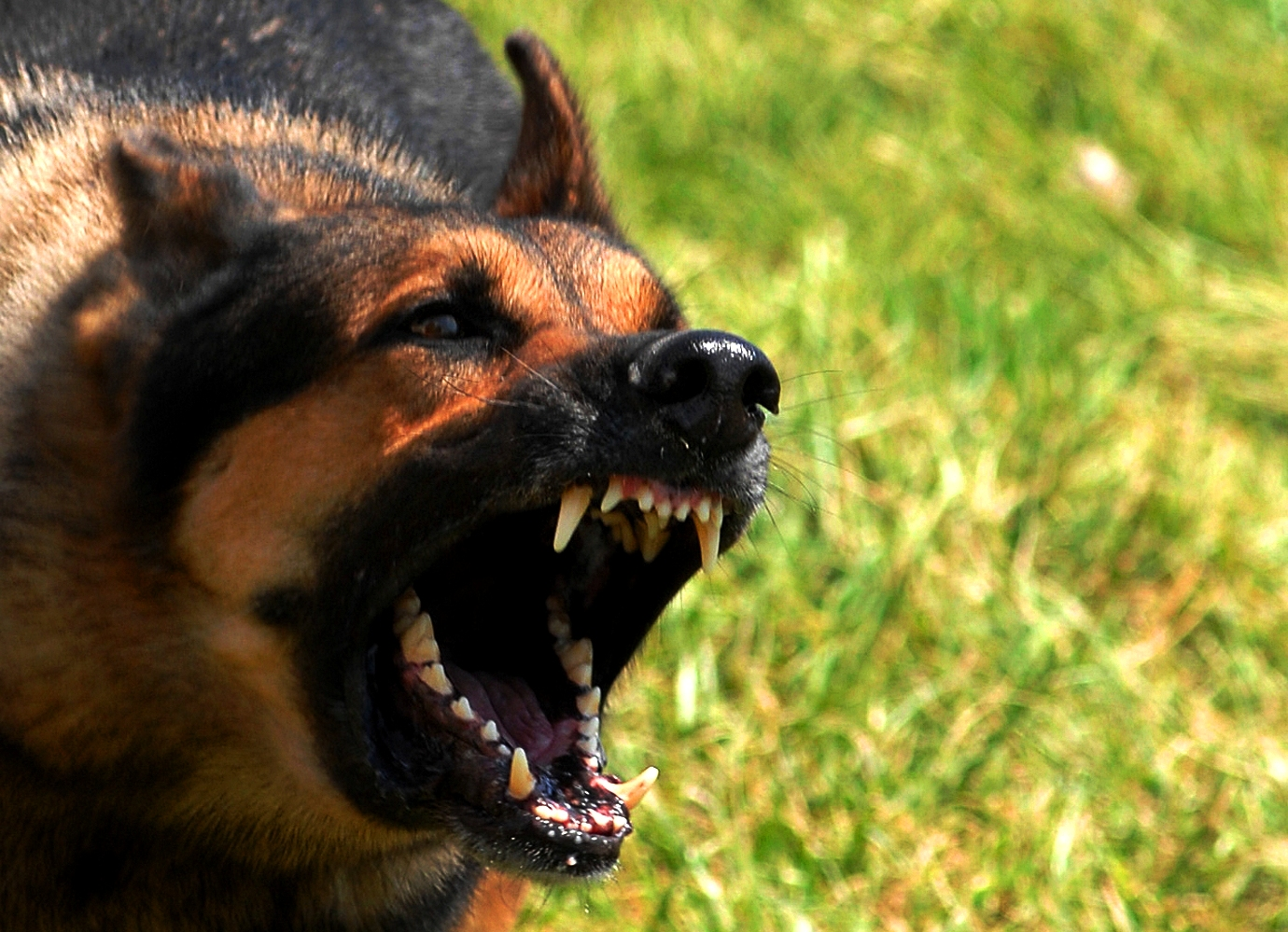
German Shepherd displaying threat behavior

Dog aggression expressed by dogs is considered to be normal behaviour and various types of aggression are influenced by a dog's environment and genetic predisposition. Dogs commonly display possessive aggression when defending resources or themselves.

Canine aggression may be influenced by a dog's age, sex, health and reproductive status. Canine aggression is one of the most serious behavior problems in animal behavioral medical science. Aggression in canines is particularly important because a dog's sharp teeth can result in serious injuries, or even fatalities in the young or frail.

The determinants for each type of aggression are different, but there are specific factors that are common to canine aggression. The types of aggression include dominance aggression, defensive aggression, predatory aggression and maternal aggression. Aggression in canines may be a self-defense response to a person or animal entering a dog's space, which may be ritualized aggression, not actual aggression, if the violation includes a threat. Aggressive behavior in scared dogs is typically not true aggression but rather ritualized behavior intended to avoid physical altercation by way of faking aggression rather than actual aggression. This ritualized behavior can be influenced by anxiety disorder, diet, gut microbiome or genetic background. Some aggression can be treated through animal behaviour therapy or avoided by proper socialization during puppyhood.

== Types of aggression ==
=== Dominance aggression ===
1) Punishing dogs has been associated with a strong likelihood of new or increased aggression and other behavior problems; 2) dominance in pet dogs is not a character trait of a dog but rather a power agreement between dogs regarding who has best access to particular resources; and 3) the behavior of dogs controlling access to resources is fluid, not static, depending on context. There is also data suggesting that the concept of spoiling a dog is often a misnomer, that this perceived spoiling is often a matter of meeting the dog's emotional and physical needs.

=== Defensive aggression ===
Defensive aggression, also known as fear aggression or avoidance-motivated aggression, occurs when an individual approaches and interacts with a human-avoidant dog. The dog might first try to flee, but may resort to aggressive behavior if cornered, as a means to try to defend itself from a real or perceived threat. The dog displays aggressive behavior in an attempt to avoid a real or perceived negative consequence, such as to avoid pain. Dogs may display a multitude of behaviors leading up to an attack including fear and stress signals, defensive posturing, facial expressions, or no signals at all. Signals are generally different for self-defensive dogs versus those who are truly aggressive, as in competitive aggression.

Tortora in 1983 experimented with a shock therapy to retrain avoidance-motivated aggressive dogs to condition them with safety cues, a process which he called Safety Training. He wrote that this therapy, when successful, had long-term benefit for the dog and its owners.

=== Predatory aggression ===
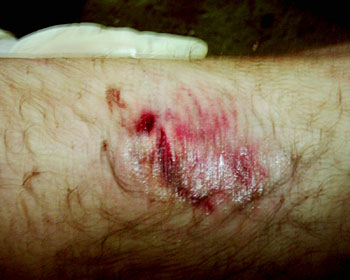
Predatory aggression is impacted by anxious influences and it includes behaviors such as biting.

Predatory aggression is usually seen as part of the prey drive sequence starting with a visual or auditory trigger followed by chase, capture and kill. Predatory aggression is impacted by anxious influences, which results in the expression of affective aggression. This type of aggression is caused by sympathetic system activation and is non-affective. Based on a study that examines the predatory aggression in German shepherd dogs, this type of aggression is rarely displayed by dogs. However, if it does occur, it is usually directed towards unfamiliar dogs. Furthermore, predatory behavior activates reward centers in the central nervous system. According to Gonzalo and colleagues, this type of behavior is rewarding and therefore difficult to change. Predatory aggression is displayed by mature and intact males and this type of aggression results in serious damage to others. It includes actions such as chasing, biting, catching and may involve death or injury.

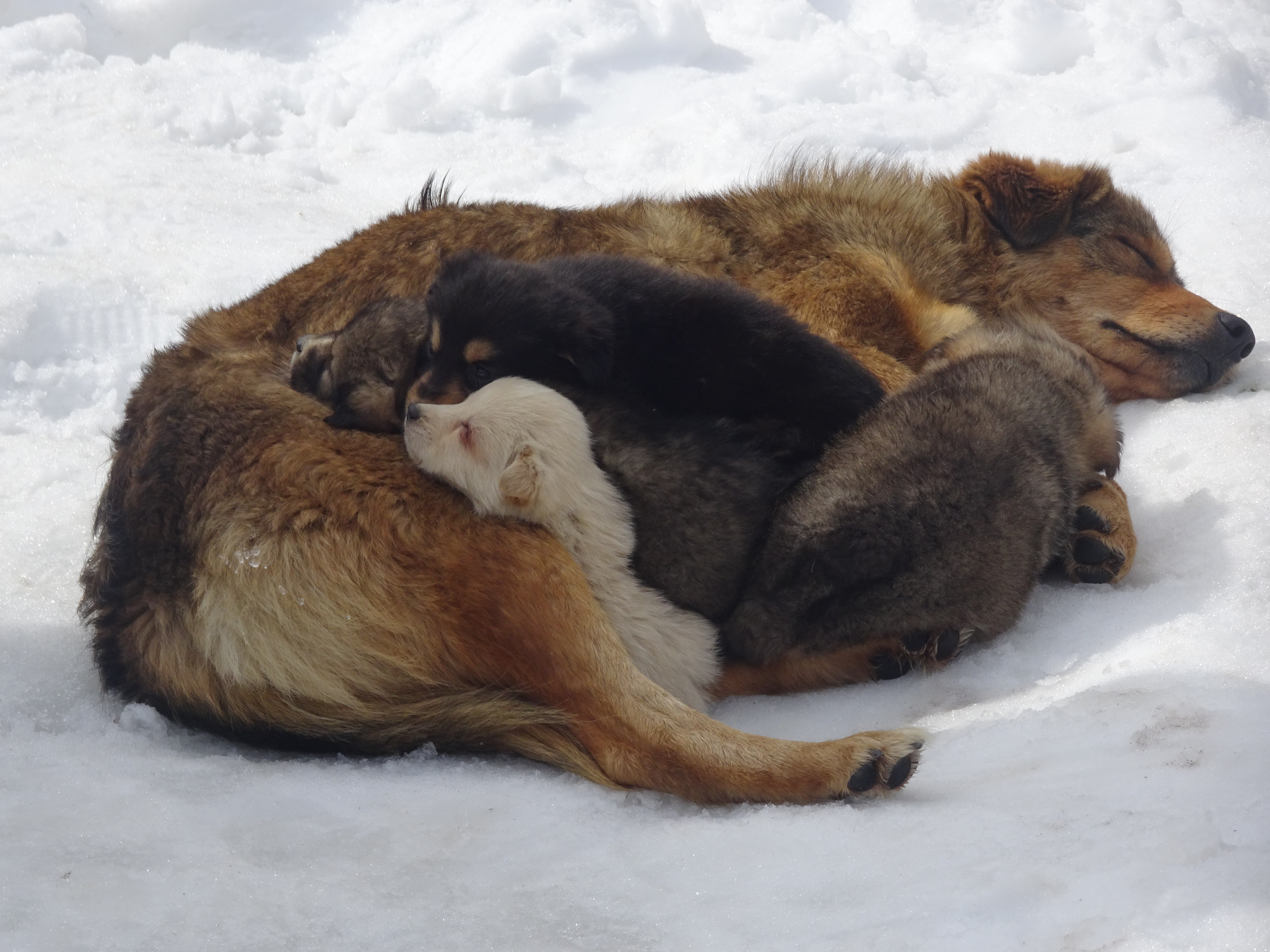
Maternal aggression is displayed by mothers that are protecting their offspring. Maternal aggression decreases as their offspring grow up and they are able to defend themselves.

=== Maternal aggression ===
Maternal aggression is displayed by mothers when they are approached and particularly when their offspring are young. This type of aggression is linked to pain such as in cases of mastitis. Oxytocin plays an important role in the early bonding between the mother and her offspring. Dogs with maternal aggressiveness are protective of their offspring and nest. The change in hormone is linked to lactation, and the mothers can change the dogs' perception and assessment . Maternal aggression may lead to bites or other attacks. Maternal aggressiveness affects the growth and socialization of puppies. Furthermore, this type of aggression may stem from unstable social environments. Maternal dogs are very protective of their puppies and their aggressive tendencies decreases as their offspring grow up and they are able to defend themselves.

=== Leash reactivity ===
Some dogs display heightened reactive behavior when restrained by a leash, manifesting as barking, lunging, growling, or pulling. This behavior is often triggered by perceived threats (other dogs, people, objects) and is mediated by frustration (being unable to approach) or fear (wanting distance but unable to flee). The restraint of the leash can exacerbate the reaction by inhibiting flight responses.

Leash reactivity is not always synonymous with aggression, but repeated reactive episodes may escalate into more severe aggression if not addressed. Owners often manage this condition by keeping the dog below its reaction threshold, applying desensitization and counterconditioning protocols, using marker-based reinforcement for disengagement, and avoiding aversive corrections, which can worsen stress and pain sensitivity.

In some cases, underlying pain or medical conditions may lower a dog's tolerance for stimuli and trigger overreactions; thus veterinarians are advised to rule out musculoskeletal or neurological causes before or alongside behavior therapy.

== Causes ==
=== Gut microbiome ===
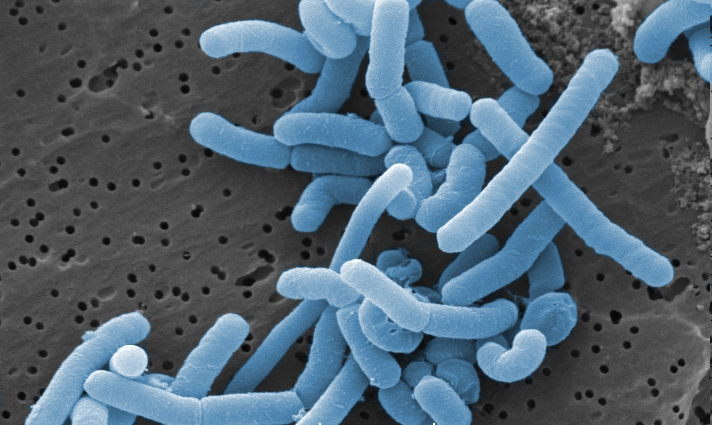
Lactobacillus are present in the guts of dogs that exhibit aggressive behavior.

The gut microbiome is linked to numerous health problems such as diarrhea and bowel disease, which results in pain and can possibly lead to aggression. The gut microbiome affects the affective disorders such as anxiety, which contribute to canine aggression. Based on a study carried out by Kirchoff and colleagues, the composition of gut microbiome differs on the basis of aggressive and non-aggressive assessments. In this study, the researchers tested rescued dogs that possessed aggressive and non aggressive behavior. The dogs were tested in the same environment, ate the same diet, and were consistent breed type, but variation was still present in the gut microbiome. The results of this study show the difference and abundance in lineages in aggressive and non-aggressive groups, indicating that an aggressive dog displays physiological conditions in their gut, which affects the composition of the gut microbiome. It also shows that the gut microbiome is associated with aggressive behavior. Lactobacillus are present in the guts of dogs that exhibit aggressive behavior, even though strains of Lactobacillus rhamnosus reduce stress and anxiety in mice. However, Fusobacterium is present in the stool sample of dogs that display non-aggressive behavior, even though it is known to evoke pro-inflammatory effects of gut microbiome.

=== Anxiety ===
Some aggression stems from generalized anxiety. The dog cannot determine the difference between a legitimate and false threat. Some signs of anxiety include dilated pupils, constant yawning and lip licking, ears pulled back, trembling, tail tucked and lowered body or head. An anxious dog may pace or be unable to relax even when there is no threat present.

Anxiety screening was used in behavioral evaluation of children-directed aggressive behavior in dogs and according to Reisner and colleagues, 77% of animals displayed abnormalities. Aggressive behavior in dogs is often associated with fear, the separation from their owner, or noise sensitivity, all of which may result in or contribute to anxiety disorder.

=== Fear ===
In a study that examines the prevalence, comorbidity, and behavioral variation in canine anxiety, owners of fearful dogs reported that their dogs demonstrate behaviors they consider aggressive, such as barking and growling, to strangers and other dogs. The owners of 673 dogs noted that their dogs express fear by barking, and growling. The presence of aggression in dogs is associated with defense mechanism. Based on this study, there was an increase in bites towards strangers and familiar people when the self-defense response was not heeded, such as by cornering an avoidant dog. However, Abrantes points out that aggressive behavior in dogs is behavior that causes pain or injury, and HSUS explains that barking and growling are normal communicative behaviors for dogs not necessarily indicative of aggression.

=== Breed, socialization, and health status ===
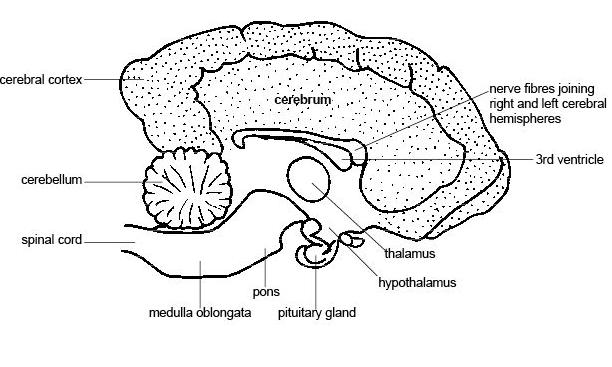
Dogs that suffer from injuries, disorders or illnesses are more likely to display aggressive behavior, especially when located in frontal cortex, the hypothalamus, the thalamus, the amygdaloid body, the medial mammillary, the nucleus, the habenular nuclei, the hippocampus and the caudate nucleus.

It is important to recognize that aggression is displayed more in certain breeds, which indicates the influence of genetic background on aggression in dogs. According to Roll and Unshelm, German Shepherd dogs and Bull Terriers are more likely to display violent behavior to others. Voith and Borchelt found that higher incidences of aggressive behavior were displayed in purebred dogs when compared with mixed breed dogs. Often, aggression in adult dogs is usually a result of little to no contact in early life. In other words, as a result of missed early socialization, a dog will not know how to interact with others, how to follow rules or how to adapt to new environments. Aggressive behavior is more prominent in intact males when compared with neutered males and in sterilized females than intact females. According to Hoerlein, the removal of a male's testicles has significant impact on aggressive and dominant males. Neoplasia of the central nervous system, infectious diseases, developmental and metabolic disorders may impact aggression in dogs. Many of these illnesses can cause aggressive and violent behavior, especially when located in the frontal cortex, the hypothalamus, the thalamus, the amygdaloid body, the medial mammillary body, the nucleus, the habenular nuclei, the hippocampus and the caudate nucleus.

== Research ==
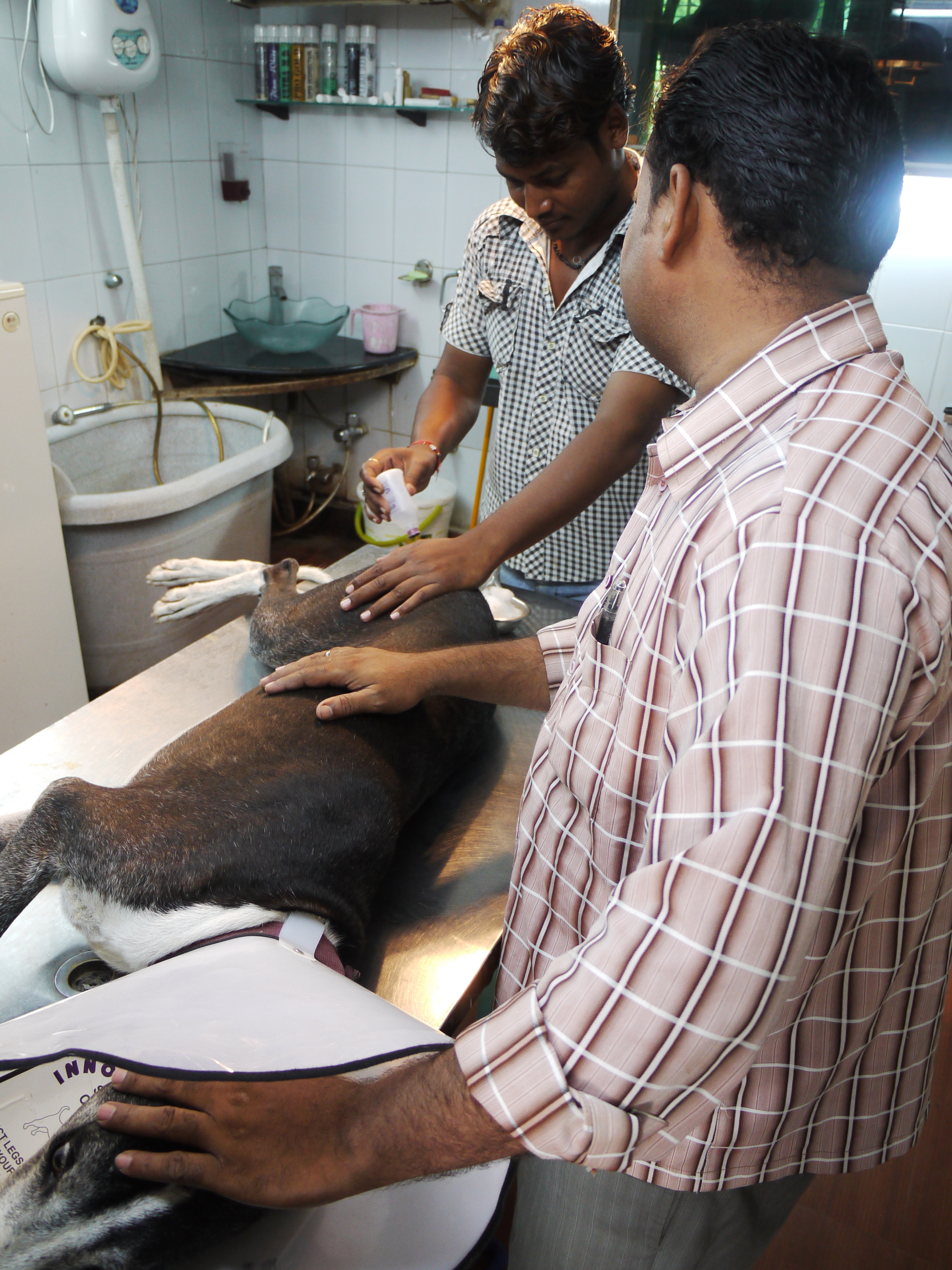
Gonadectomy also known as neuter or castration is one of the most common procedures performed on dogs. It is the removal of reproductive organs. This procedure is performed at the veterinary by a professional veterinarian.

=== Gonadectomy ===
Gonadectomy is used to treat aggressive behavior of dogs. Farhoody and colleagues carried out a study to determine the impact of gonadectomy on the aggressive behavior of dogs using the Canine Behavioral Assessment Research Questionnaire (C-BARQ). According to the data collected, gonadectomized dogs between the ages of 7 and 12 months were more likely to be aggressive to strangers.

Furthermore, gonadectomized dogs of all ages do not display violent behavior to familiar people or strangers. The data does not show that gonadectomy prevent or treat aggressive behavior of dogs.

Based on McMillan and colleagues' research, aggressive behavior was prominent in dogs obtained from pet stores. Guy and colleagues found that environmental factors directly contributed to aggression in dogs. For instance, a dog that lives in a home with an adolescent or has a skin disorder is more likely to exhibit aggressive behavior to familiar people and strangers.

Roll and Unshelm believed that the reason for buying or adopting a dog was a significant factor that correlated with aggression. They also argued that the relationship between the owner and dog determined whether or not the dog would exhibit aggressive behavior. For instance, the owner's attitude towards training, or physical mistreatment endured by the dog at the hands of the owner resulted in aggressive behavior towards others. Many factors impact the aggressive behavior displayed by dogs.

=== Reactivity to stimuli ===
According to Arata and colleagues, reactivity to stimuli is involved in various types of aggression. The researchers used a questionnaire survey to assess approximately 5000 dogs of 17 breeds. In this study, a factor analysis was used to extract five consistent factors in 14 of the 17 breeds. Using 14 behavioral items, the researchers were able to see the consistent presence of these factors in dogs, indicating that these factors are linked to canine aggression.

The collected data and the established factor system indicated that the French Bulldog, Cavalier King Charles Spaniel, Golden Retriever, and Labrador Retriever did not display aggressive behavior. However, the Chihuahua and Miniature Dachshund were more aggressive and more likely to chase others.

Based on this study, reactivity to stimuli was linked to owner-directed aggressive behavior in 13 different breeds, child-directed aggressive behavior in eight different breeds, stranger-directed aggressive behavior in nine breeds and dog-directed aggressive behavior in five breeds. In this study, dogs that are highly reactive to stimuli were either uneasy and reacted to all movements or less engaged and overreacted to unexpected stimuli.

The association between canine aggression and sociability with humans and likeliness to chase were examined. Sociability with humans was linked to child-, stranger-, and dog-directed aggressive behavior in more than seven breeds. Moreover, likeliness to chase was primarily linked to dog-directed aggressive behavior in 10 breeds and dogs that were more likely to chase smaller animals displayed aggressive behavior when interacting with other dogs. Reactivity to stimuli was proven to be an underlying temperamental factor that leads to canine aggression.

Other work has detailed how external stimuli significantly influences the experience of dog walking, sometimes "extracting a considerable social and emotional toll" for dog walkers.

== Treatment ==
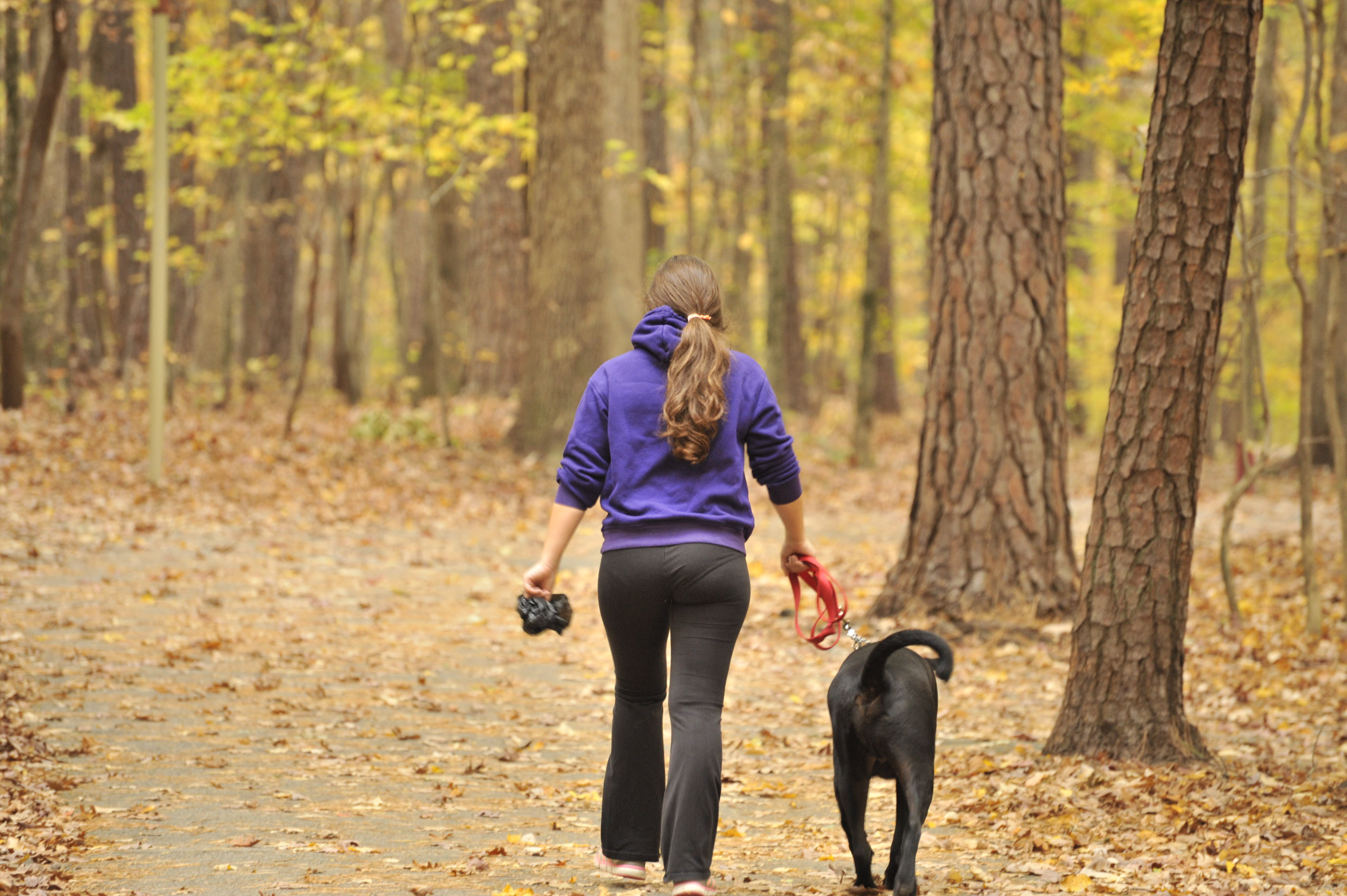
A dog is being walked by its owner with a leash, which is used to establish and maintain control. It is an owner's responsibility to modify aggressive behavior of their dog.

Treatment differs for each circumstance, and treatment plans are based heavily on the type of aggression. Based on Judith Blackshaw's study, dogs exhibited dominance aggression towards familiar people and therefore suggested obedience training as the proper treatment. According to a study conducted in 1983 by Tortora, avoidance based aggression was treated by conditioning the dog to a safety tone, this resulted in a complete elimination of the aggressive behavior for the duration of the dogs lives. Aggression can also be reduced in adult dogs during their socialization period as a puppy. Studies show that exposing puppies to their new owners and homing before 8 weeks can drastically reduce aggression later in life. However, it is still imperative for an owner to train their dog every day for a minimum of 10 minutes. More specifically, it is recommended for males to be neutered as this ensures that inherited aggression will not be passed on. It is suggested to use synthetic progestins with castration to reduce and eliminate aggressive behavior in dogs. Predatory and intermale aggression is inherent and related to testosterone secretion and as a result restrain, castration and the use of progestins are essential in reducing aggression in dogs. Some studies suggest that aversive means of control and training contribute to new and increased aggression rather than reduce it.

== See also ==
- Dog behaviourist
- Game (dog)
