= Socialization of animals =

Socialization of animals is the process of training animals so that they can be kept in close relationship to humans.

== Dogs ==
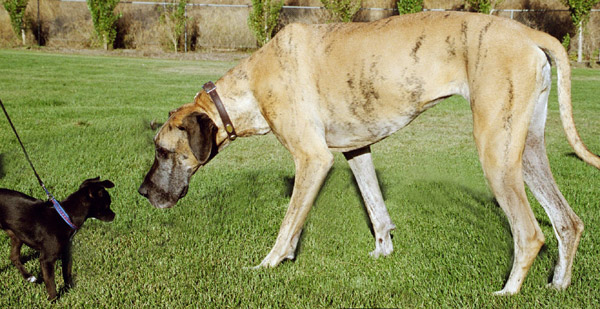
Socialized dogs can interact with other non-aggressive dogs of any size and shape and understand how to communicate.

The critical period of socialization begins at approximately three weeks of age and continues until about twelve to fourteen weeks, after which puppies enter the juvenile stage of development. During this period, puppies form social bonds, explore their environment, and develop appropriate fear responses. Habituation to environmental stimuli also occurs at this stage, allowing puppies to perceive common sights, sounds, smells, and tactile experiences as non-threatening. Experiences during this period have a lasting influence on temperament and behaviour.

It is critical that human interaction takes place frequently and calmly from the time the puppies are born, from simple, gentle handling to the mere presence of humans in the vicinity of the puppies, performing everyday tasks and activities. As puppies mature, regular exposure to other dogs, people, and environments facilitates effective socialization. Dogs that are well socialized early in life are generally less likely to develop aggression or fear-related behaviours.

The cognitional development of puppies can be affected when the critical period of socialization is disrupted. Physiological consequences of this period not occurring can lead to puppies maturing to adults who are not able to react appropriately to new environments, situations or people. Inadequate socialization during early development may contribute to behavioural problems, including aggression, avoidance behaviours, fear-based responses, and excessive vocalization such as persistent barking. It is estimated that one in four adult dogs have at least one behavioural problem. Dogs are the animal which is typically the most closely attached to humans, developing tightly wound relationships with people. Therefore, it is crucial for the safety of both parties that there is adequate training in place.

Dogs experience socialization through the critical period of socialization in two main types: active and passive. Active implies the intended socialization of humans introducing their puppy to something/someone new (i.e. at obedience class or a ride in the car). Active puppy socialization focuses on creating positive emotional associations with new experiences rather than simply increasing the number of exposures. However, passive involves socialization of the puppy to something/someone new in which they have done so unintentionally themselves (i.e. insects found in the backyard while exploring or items found while running around the house).

Dogs will often learn two ways; by association and consequence. Learning by association is classified as classical conditioning, while learning by consequence is called operant conditioning. With puppy socialization, classical conditioning involves pairing something they love with something within the environment. Additionally, operant conditioning involves the puppy learning to do something to achieve getting what they want. These two learning types can occur simultaneously with a puppy having the ability to learn both an internal and external response to a stimulus. In contrast, a puppy can also demonstrate methods of actively avoiding a situation they do not enjoy.

=== Socialization experiments ===
==== Using puppies ====
The researchers, Fox and Stelzner did a socialization experiment on puppies of the same species. The major finding of this experiment is the fact that the puppies weaned from the mother at a later age (12 weeks) have better socialization skills. This proves that the beginning of a puppy's life is a very important time for socialization and will affect their social tendencies for the rest of their lives.

Hennessey, Morris, and Linden conducted a socialization experiment using inmates as handlers of the shelter dogs being studied. These researchers found that the dogs in the experimental group did not jump on and bark at unfamiliar humans as much as the dogs in the control group did. The socialized dogs also showed to be more responsive to commands than did the dogs in the control group. The researchers believe that through more effective socialization, more dogs can be adopted from shelters.

Battagalia claims that there are 3 important periods during the first year of life for a puppy. Her research shows that if puppies experience stimulation from humans during the first few months of their lives, they will be less likely to feel stress in their adult lives and they will be better socialized. She claims this is a very important thing for dog breeders to know to improve the success of their puppy's future lives.

==== Using dog and wolf puppies ====
A study done by the six researchers, Topál, Gácsi, Miklósi, Zirányi, Kubinyi, and Csányi compares the inherent social tendencies between dog puppies and wolf puppies. What these researchers found was that dog puppies showed attachment to their owners and showed to be more responsive to their owner than an unfamiliar person. The wolf puppies did not show to be more responsive to their owners than to an unfamiliar human. Researchers concluded that this is a genetic difference between species.

These six researchers attempted to answer the question, "Why?" in their next experiment. They found that dogs were more successful in finding hidden food and in completing a learned task than wolves were. The most prominent observation these researchers made was that the dogs would look into the eyes of the human as if looking for a clue and the wolves would not look at the faces of the humans. They concluded that this is a genetic difference between the two species as a result of evolution.

== Monkeys ==
Monkeys are often studied because of the close evolutionary relationship between monkeys and humans. Like humans, some monkeys tend to show declining social activity with age. Research has shown that older females spent less time grooming other and interacted with fewer animals than younger individuals did.

=== Socialization experiments ===
Bernstein and Ehardt conducted an experiment on aggressive behavior of rhesus monkeys. They found that the monkeys showed more aggression towards kin than non-kin, mostly from older kin to younger kin. This supports the hypothesis that aggression is used in socialization and correction of inappropriate behaviors in the immature monkeys. If the aggression is no more severe than is needed to correct the behavior, it can improve the survival rate of all the relatives.

In 1980, Berman researched the mother-infant relationship of rhesus monkeys both in the wild and in captivity. She found many similarities between the two parenting styles but some minor differences. The captive mother has been described as more protective and less willing to let her infant out of her control. The difference that likely has the most effect on this relationship is, the wild monkey has kin around which helps with the socialization of the infant, and the mother in captivity does not. This shows how environmental factors can affect the early socialization of infant rhesus monkeys.

Socialization at a young age has been seen to affect sexual behavior in the adult rhesus monkey, in a study done by, Gold, Wallen, and Goldfoot. This is not seen as prominently in rats, and other small animals as it is in primates. The monkeys have difficulty acting normally even when a sexual opportunity presents itself, this is due to the fact that they have affectional disorders that they do not often overcome.

It is very difficult to study the lives of isolated children so researchers have turned to studying the effect of total isolation on rhesus monkeys. Completely isolated monkey's first response to stimulus is fear or aggression. They do not learn any normal socio-emotional skills. When these monkeys are able to come in contact with a group, they do not know how to interact and would not be able to survive in a group.

== See also ==
- Socialization
- Animal training
- Interspecies friendship
- Littermate syndrome
