= Dog behavior =

Internally coordinated responses of dogs to internal and external stimuli

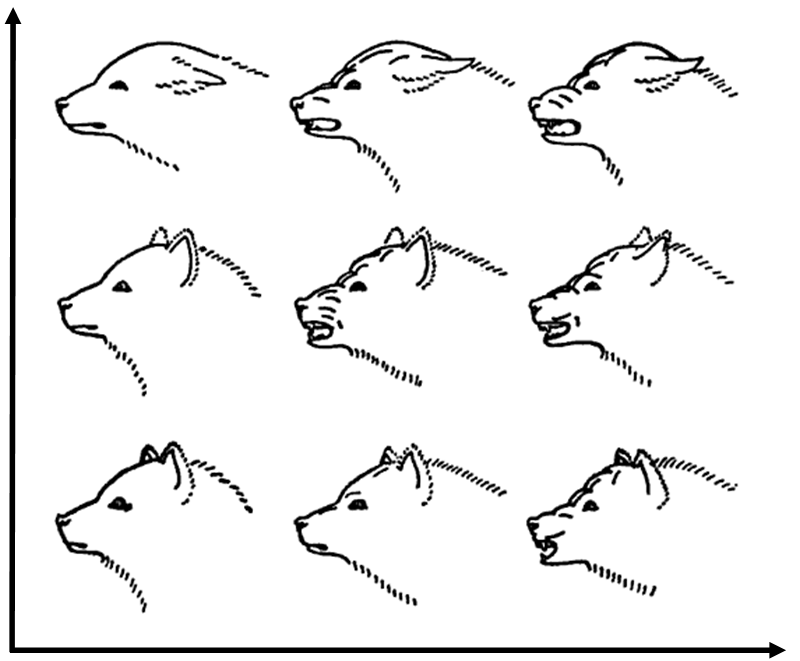
A drawing by Konrad Lorenz showing facial expressions of a dog - a communication behavior. X-axis is aggression, y-axis is fear.

Dog behavior refers to the internally coordinated responses of individuals or groups of domestic dogs to internal and external stimuli. It has been shaped by millennia of contact with humans and adaptation to human lifestyles. As a result of this physical and social evolution, dogs have acquired the ability to understand and communicate with humans. Behavioral scientists have uncovered a wide range of social-cognitive abilities in domestic dogs. Dog behavior is influenced by a combination of physiological factors, environmental conditions, and human interaction, all of which play a part in the development of a dog's behavior and overall welfare.

== Co-evolution with humans ==
The origin of the domestic dog (Canis familiaris) is not clear. Whole-genome sequencing indicates that the dog, the gray wolf and the extinct Taymyr wolf diverged around the same time 27,000–40,000 years ago. How dogs became domesticated is not clear, however the two main hypotheses are self-domestication or human domestication. There exists evidence of human-canine behavioral coevolution.

== Intelligence ==
Dog intelligence is the ability of the dog to perceive information and retain it as knowledge in order to solve problems. Dogs have been shown to learn by inference. A study with Rico showed that he knew the labels of over 200 different items. He inferred the names of novel items by exclusion learning and correctly retrieved those novel items immediately. He also retained this ability four weeks after the initial exposure. Dogs have advanced memory skills. A study documented the learning and memory capabilities of a border collie, "Chaser", who had learned the names and could associate by verbal command over 1,000 words. Dogs are able to read and react appropriately to human body language such as gesturing and pointing, and to understand human voice commands. After undergoing training to solve a simple manipulation task, dogs that are faced with an insolvable version of the same problem look at the human, while socialized wolves do not. Dogs demonstrate a theory of mind by engaging in deception.

== Senses ==
The dog's senses include vision, hearing, sense of smell, taste, touch, proprioception, and sensitivity to the Earth's magnetic field.

== Communication behavior ==
Dog communication is about how dogs "speak" to each other, how they understand messages that humans send to them, and how humans can translate the ideas that dogs are trying to transmit. These communication behaviors include eye gaze, facial expression, vocalization, body posture (including movements of bodies and limbs) and gustatory communication (scents, pheromones and taste). Humans communicate with dogs by using vocalization, hand signals, and body posture. Dogs can also learn to understand the communication of emotions with humans by reading human facial expressions.

== Social behavior ==
Two studies have indicated that dog behavior vary based on their size, body weight, and skull size.

=== Play ===
==== Dog and dog ====
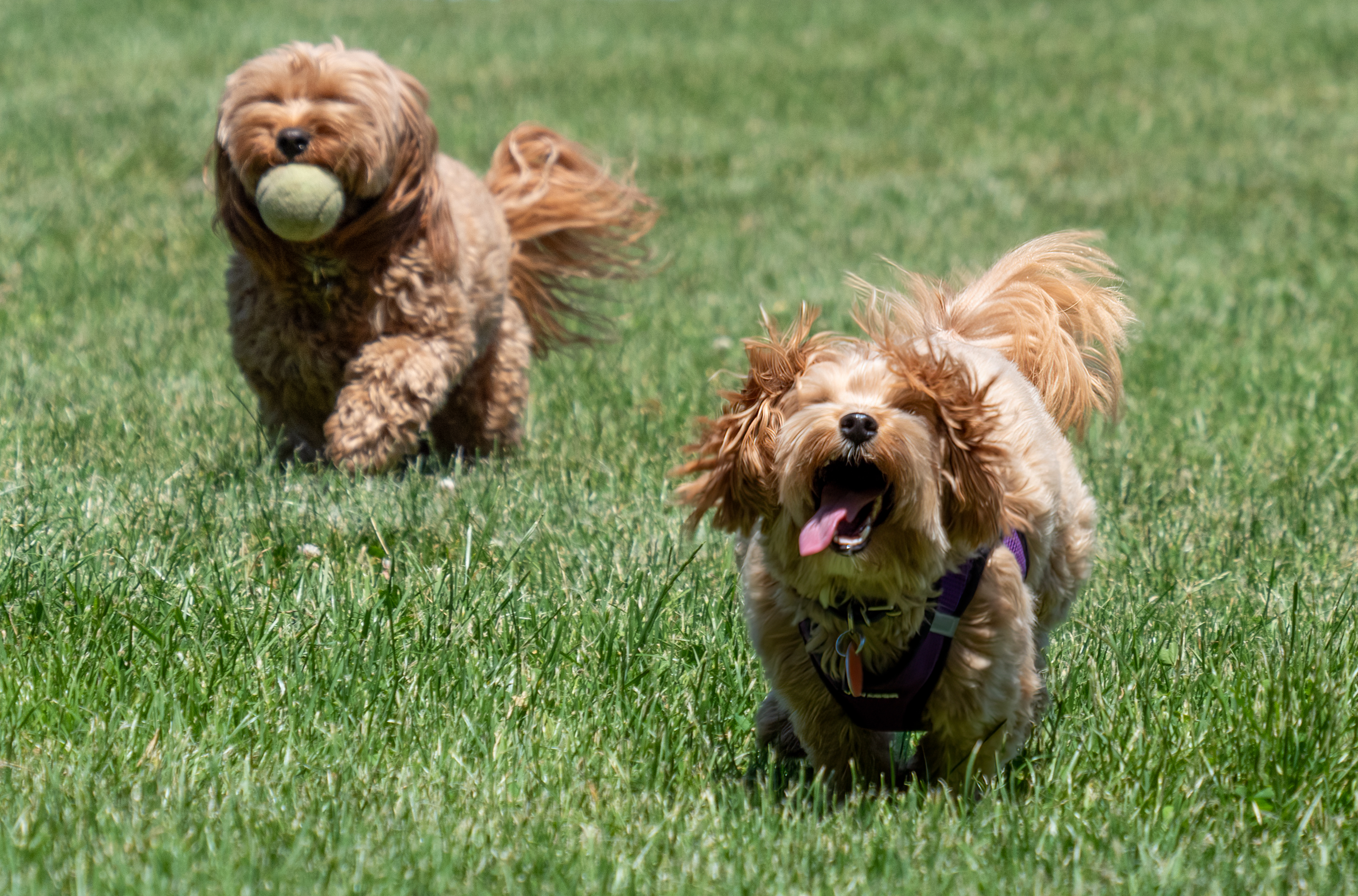
A cavapoo and maltipoo running back while playing fetch

Play between dogs usually involves several behaviors often seen in aggressive encounters, such as nipping, biting and growling. It is therefore important for the dogs to place these behaviors in the context of the play, rather than aggression. Dogs signal their intent to play with a range of behaviors including a "play-bow", "face-paw", "open-mouthed play face" and postures inviting the other dog to chase the initiator. Similar signals are given throughout the play to maintain the context of the potentially aggressive activities.

From a young age, dogs engage in play with one another. Dog play is made up primarily of mock fights. It is believed that this behavior, which is most common in puppies, is training for important behaviors later in life. Some early socialization methods, such as puppy classes or "puppy parties" have been shown to positively influence adult dog behavior. Play between puppies is not necessarily a 50:50 symmetry of dominant and submissive roles between the individuals; dogs who engage in greater rates of dominant behaviors (e.g. chasing, forcing partners down) at later ages also initiate play at higher rates. This could imply that winning during play becomes more important as puppies mature.

Emotional contagion is linked to facial mimicry in humans and primates. Facial mimicry is an automatic response that occurs in less than 1 second in which one person involuntarily mimics another person's facial expressions, forming empathy. It has also been found in dogs at play, and play sessions lasted longer when there were facial mimicry signals from one dog to another.

==== Dog and human ====
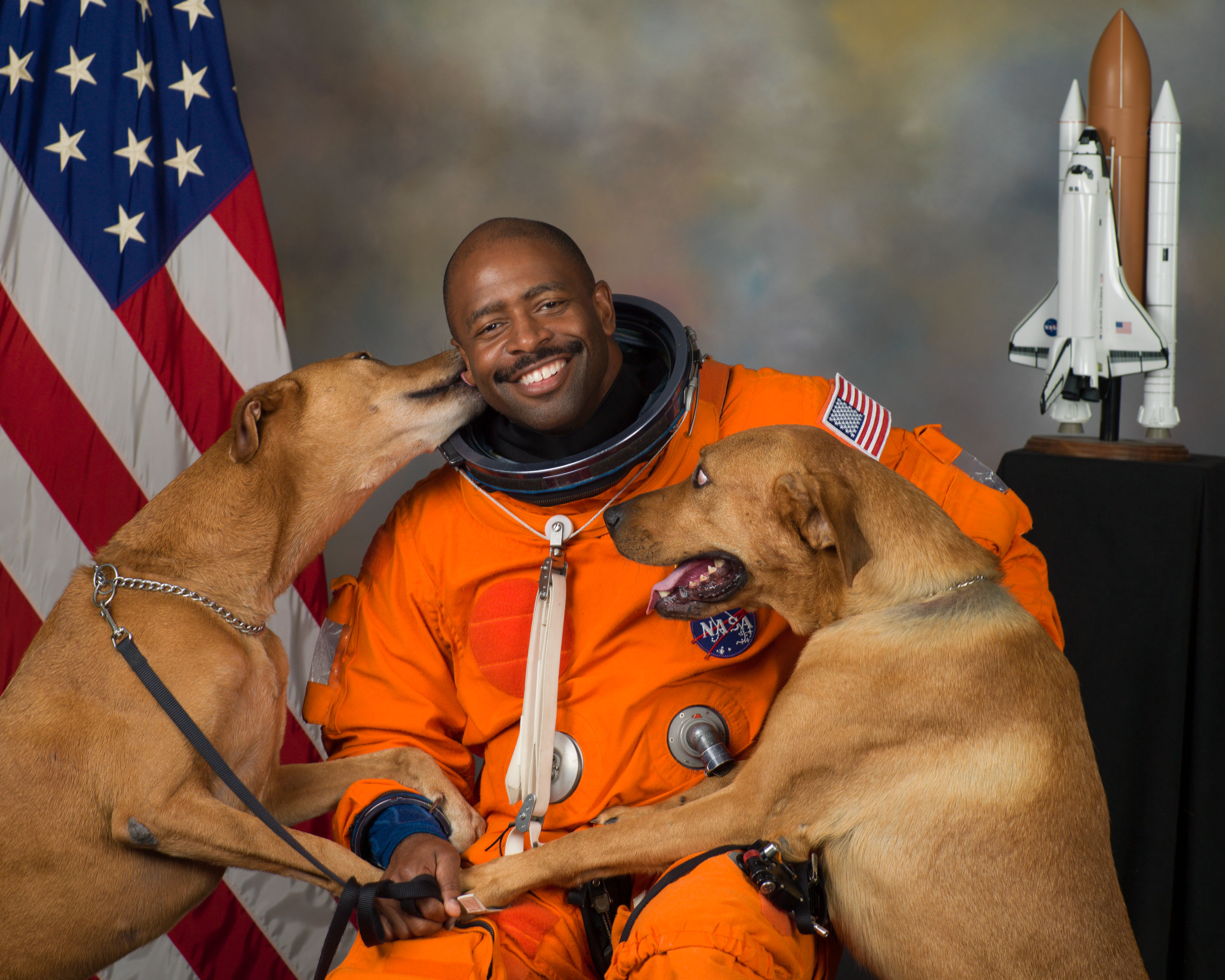
NASA astronaut Leland D. Melvin with his dogs Jake and Scout

The motivation for a dog to play with another dog is different from that of a dog playing with a human. Dogs walked together with opportunities to play with one another and play with their owners, choose to play with their owners at the same frequency as dogs being walked alone. Dogs in households with two or more dogs only play slightly more often with their owners than dogs in households with a single dog, indicating the motivation to play with other dogs does not substitute for the motivation to play with humans.

It is a common misconception that winning and losing games such as "tug-of-war" and "rough-and-tumble" can influence a dog's dominant relationship with humans. Rather, how dogs play indicates their temperament and relationship with their owner. Dogs that play rough-and-tumble are more amenable and show lower separation anxiety than dogs which play other types of games, and dogs playing tug-of-war and "fetch" are more confident. Dogs that start most games are less amenable and more likely to be aggressive.

Scientific studies highlight the unique bonds between humans and dogs, showing how friendship and communication has evolved through domestication. Playing with humans can affect the cortisol levels of dogs. In one study, the cortisol responses of police dogs and border guard dogs were assessed after playing with their handlers. The cortisol concentrations of the police dogs increased, whereas the border guard dogs' hormone levels decreased. The researchers noted that during the play sessions, police officers were disciplining their dogs, whereas the border guards were truly playing with them, i.e. this included bonding and affectionate behaviors. They commented that several studies have shown that behaviors associated with control, authority or aggression increase cortisol, whereas play and affiliation behavior decrease cortisol levels.

=== Empathy ===
In 2012, a study found that dogs oriented toward their owner or a stranger more often when the person was pretending to cry than when they were talking or humming. When the stranger pretended to cry, rather than approaching their usual source of comfort, their owner, dogs sniffed, nuzzled and licked the stranger instead. The dogs' pattern of response was behaviorally consistent with an expression of empathic concern.

A study found a third of dogs suffered from anxiety when separated from others.

=== Personalities ===
The term personality has been applied to human research, whereas the term temperament has been mostly used for animal research. However, both terms have been used interchangeably in the literature, or purely to distinguish humans from animals and avoid anthropomorphism. Personality can be defined as "a set of behaviors that are consistent over context and time". Studies of dogs' personalities have tried to identify the presence of broad personality traits that are stable and consistent over time.

There are different approaches to assess dog personality:

- Ratings of individual dogs: either a caretaker or a dog expert who is familiar with the dog is asked to answer a questionnaire, for instance the Canine Behavioral Assessment and Research Questionnaire , concerning how often the dog shows certain types of behavior.
- Tests: the dog is submitted to a set of tests and its reactions are evaluated on a behavioral scale. For instance, the dog is presented to a familiar and then an unfamiliar person in order to measure sociability or aggression.
- Observational test: The dog's behavior is evaluated in a selected but not controlled environment. An observer focuses on the dog's reactions to naturally occurring stimuli. For example, a walk through the supermarket can allow the observer to see the dog in various types of conditions (crowded, noisy…)

Several potential personality traits have been identified in dogs, for instance "Playfulness", "Curiosity/Fearlessness, "Chase-proneness", "Sociability and Aggressiveness" and "Shyness–Boldness". A meta-analysis of 51 published peer-reviewed articles identified seven dimensions of canine personality:

1. Reactivity (approach or avoidance of new objects, increased activity in novel situations)
2. Fearfulness (shaking, avoiding novel situations)
3. Activity
4. Sociability (initiating friendly interactions with people and other dogs)
5. Responsiveness to training (working with people, learning quickly)
6. Submissiveness
7. Aggression

With regard to the nature versus nurture debate, according to a study in April 2022 carried out by Kathleen Morrill and others who work in a laboratory that was based on genetic and survey data of nearly 2000 dogs, with the majority of them having their entire genomes sequenced, as well as survey results from 16,000 owners of dogs. The dogs included mixes and purebreds, with 128 breeds represented. The study found that the physical traits of a dog can be attributed to 80% on DNA and that retrieving and friendliness around humans were predominantly genetic. But, breed alone is only responsible for about 9% of individual personality differences, with about 25% of personality traits determined by (mainly individual) genetics in total, and the rest determined by the environment. However, a study in December 2022 challenged those findings after the researching of the genetic codes of 4,000 dogs and 46,000 dog owners and concluded that a dog's breed does genetically influence a dog's personality.

The effects of age and sex have not been clearly determined. The personality models can be used for a range of tasks, including guide and working dog selection, finding appropriate families to re-home shelter dogs, or selecting breeding stock.

=== Leadership, dominance and social groups ===
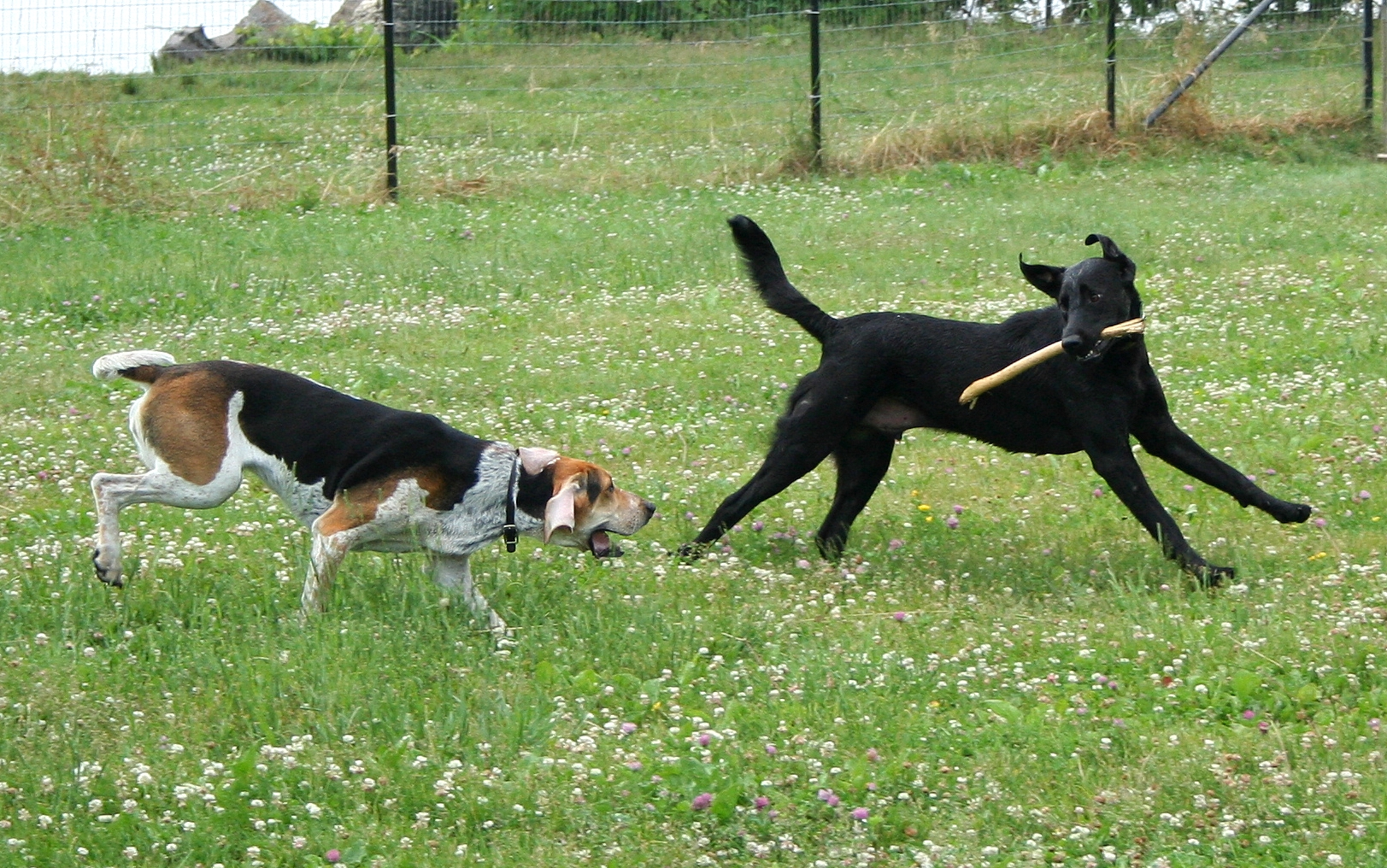
Two dogs playing follow the leader

Dominance is a descriptive term for the relationship between pairs of individuals. Among ethologists, dominance has been defined as "an attribute of the pattern of repeated, antagonistic interactions between two individuals, characterized by a consistent outcome in favor of the same dyad member and a default yielding response of its opponent rather than escalation. The status of the consistent winner is dominant and that of the loser subordinate." Another definition is that a dominant animal has "priority of access to resources". Dominance is a relative attribute, not absolute; there is no reason to assume that a high-ranking individual in one group would also become high ranking if moved to another. Nor is there any good evidence that "dominance" is a lifelong character trait. Competitive behavior characterized by confident (e.g. growl, inhibited bite, stand over, stare at, chase, bark at) and submissive (e.g. crouch, avoid, displacement lick/yawn, run away) patterns exchanged.

One test to ascertain in which group the dominant dog was used the following criteria: When a stranger comes to the house, which dog starts to bark first or if they start to bark together, which dog barks more or longer? Which dog licks more often the other dog's mouth? If the dogs get food at the same time and at the same spot, which dog starts to eat first or eats the other dog's food? If the dogs start to fight, which dog usually wins?

Domestic dogs appear to pay little attention to relative size, despite the large weight differences between the largest and smallest individuals; for example, size was not a predictor of the outcome of encounters between dogs meeting while being exercised by their owners nor was size correlated with neutered male dogs. Therefore, many dogs do not appear to pay much attention to the actual fighting ability of their opponent, presumably allowing differences in motivation (how much the dog values the resource) and perceived motivation (what the behavior of the other dog signifies about the likelihood that it will escalate) to play a much greater role.

Two dogs that are contesting possession of a highly valued resource for the first time, if one is in a state of emotional arousal, in pain; if reactivity is influenced by recent endocrine changes, or motivational states such as hunger, then the outcome of the interaction may be different than if none of these factors were present. Equally, the threshold at which aggression is shown may be influenced by a range of medical factors, or, in some cases, precipitated entirely by pathological disorders. Hence, the contextual and physiological factors present when two dogs first encounter each other may profoundly influence the long-term nature of the relationship between those dogs. The complexity of the factors involved in this type of learning means that dogs may develop different "expectations" about the likely response of another individual for each resource in a range of different situations. Puppies learn early not to challenge an older dog and this respect stays with them into adulthood. When adult animals meet for the first time, they have no expectations of the behavior of the other: they will both, therefore, be initially anxious and vigilant in this encounter (characterized by the tense body posture and sudden movements typically seen when two dogs first meet), until they start to be able to predict the responses of the other individual. The outcome of these early adult–adult interactions will be influenced by the specific factors present at the time of the initial encounters. As well as contextual and physiological factors, the experiences of each member of the dyad of other dogs will also influence their behavior.

=== Scent ===
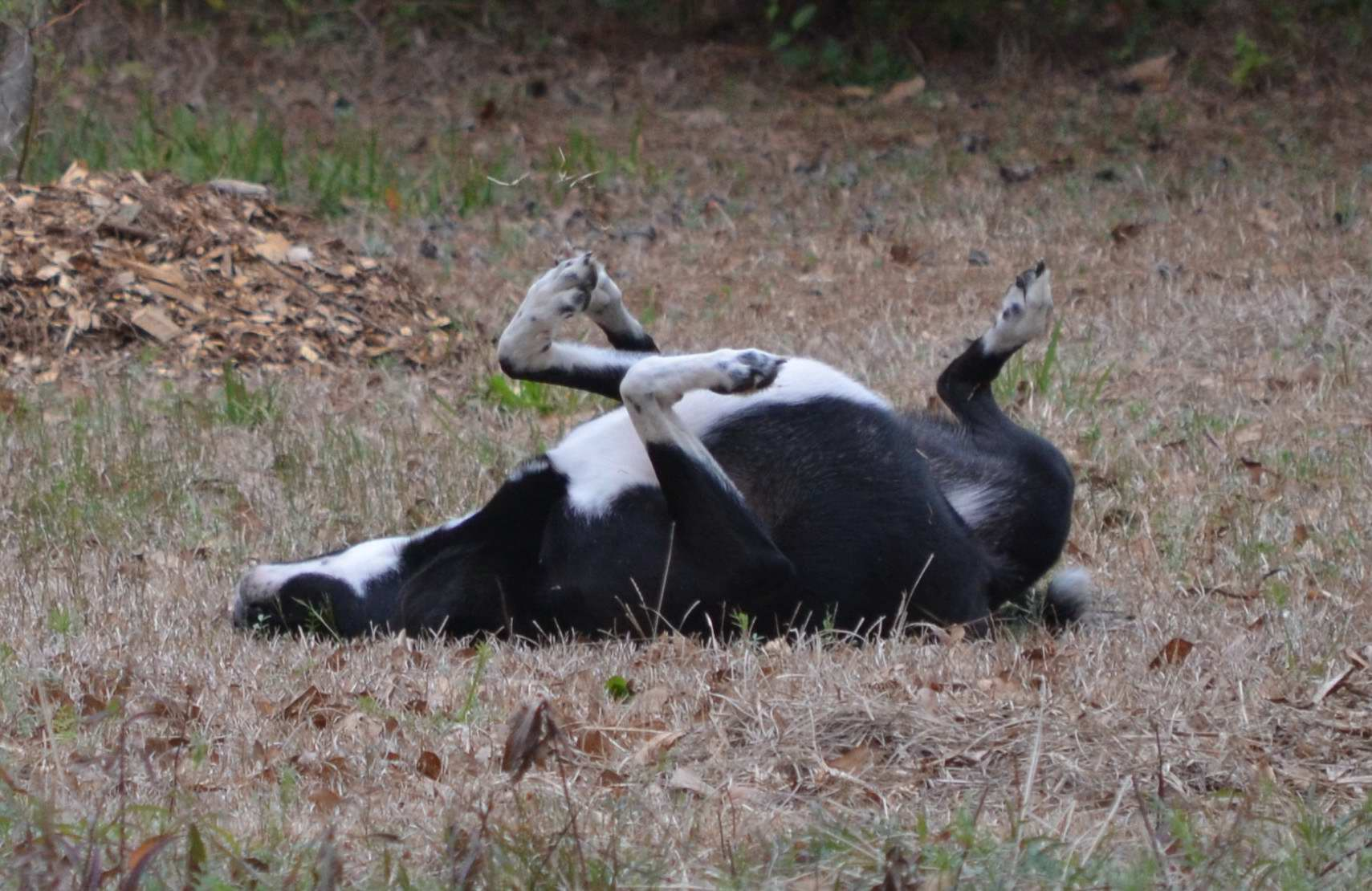
Scent-rolling

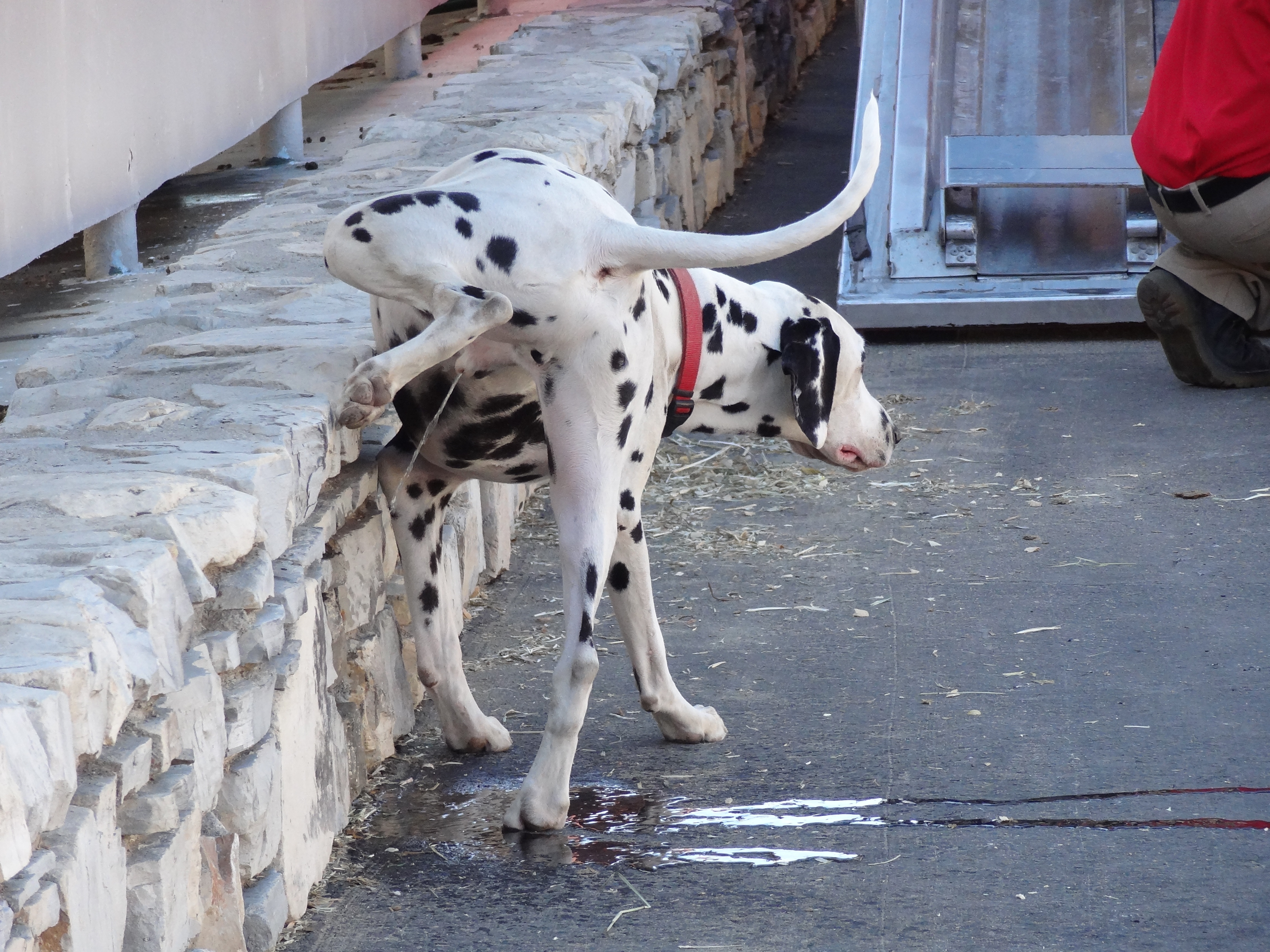
Raised-leg urination posture

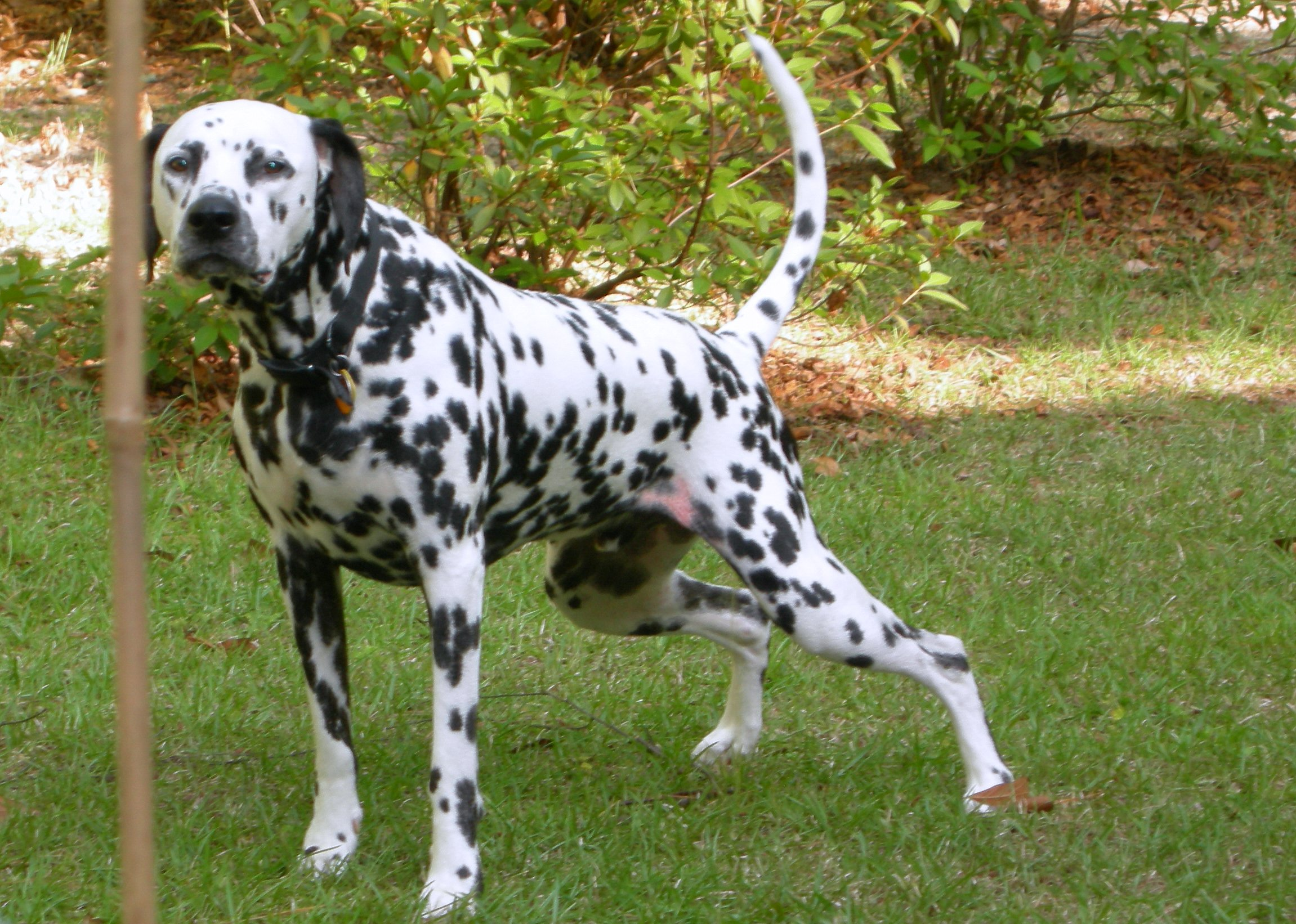
Standing urination posture

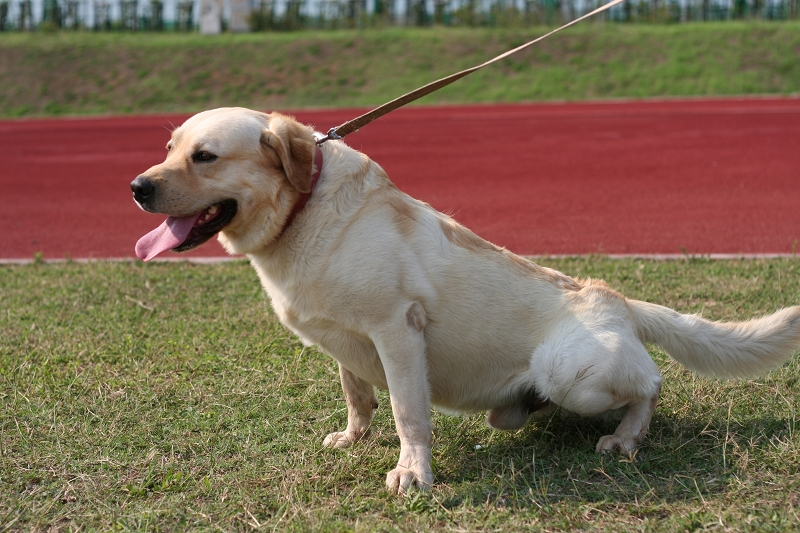
Squatting urination posture

Dogs have an olfactory sense 40 times more sensitive than a human's and they commence their lives operating almost exclusively on smell and touch. The special scents that dogs use for communication are called pheromones. Different hormones are secreted when a dog is angry, fearful or confident, and some chemical signatures identify the sex and age of the dog, and if a female is in the estrus cycle, pregnant or recently given birth. Many of the pheromone chemicals can be found dissolved in a dog's urine, and sniffing where another dog has urinated gives the dog a great deal of information about that dog. Male dogs prefer to mark vertical surfaces and having the scent higher allows the air to carry it farther. The height of the marking tells other dogs about the size of the dog, as among canines size is an important factor in dominance.

Dogs (and wolves) mark their territories with urine and their stools. The anal gland of canines give a particular signature to fecal deposits and identifies the marker as well as the place where the dung is left. Dogs are very particular about these landmarks, and engage in what is to humans a meaningless and complex ritual before defecating. Most dogs start with a careful bout of sniffing of a location, perhaps to erect an exact line or boundary between their territory and another dog's territory. This behavior may also involve a small degree of elevation, such as a rock or fallen branch, to aid scent dispersal. Scratching the ground after defecating is a visual sign pointing to the scent marking. The freshness of the scent gives visitors some idea of the current status of a piece of territory and if it is used frequently. Regions under dispute, or used by different animals at different times, may lead to marking battles with every scent marked-over by a new competitor.

=== Feral dogs ===
Feral dogs are those dogs living in a wild state with no food and shelter intentionally provided by humans, and showing a continuous and strong avoidance of direct human contacts. In the developing world pet dogs are uncommon, but feral, village or community dogs are plentiful around humans. The distinction between feral, stray, and free-ranging dogs is sometimes a matter of degree, and a dog may shift its status throughout its life. In some unlikely but observed cases, a feral dog that was not born wild but living with a feral group can become behavior-modified to a domestic dog with an owner. A dog can become a stray when it escapes human control, by abandonment or being born to a stray mother. A stray dog can become feral when forced out of the human environment or when co-opted or socially accepted by a nearby feral group. Feralization occurs through the development of the human avoidance response.

Feral dogs are not reproductively self-sustaining, suffer from high rates of juvenile mortality, and depend indirectly on humans for their food, their space, and the supply of co-optable individuals.

See further: behavior compared to other canids.

=== Other behavior ===
Dogs have a general behavioral trait of strongly preferring novelty ("neophillia") compared to familiarity. The average sleep time of a dog in captivity in a 24-hour period is 10.1 hours.

== Reproduction behavior ==
=== Estrous cycle and mating ===
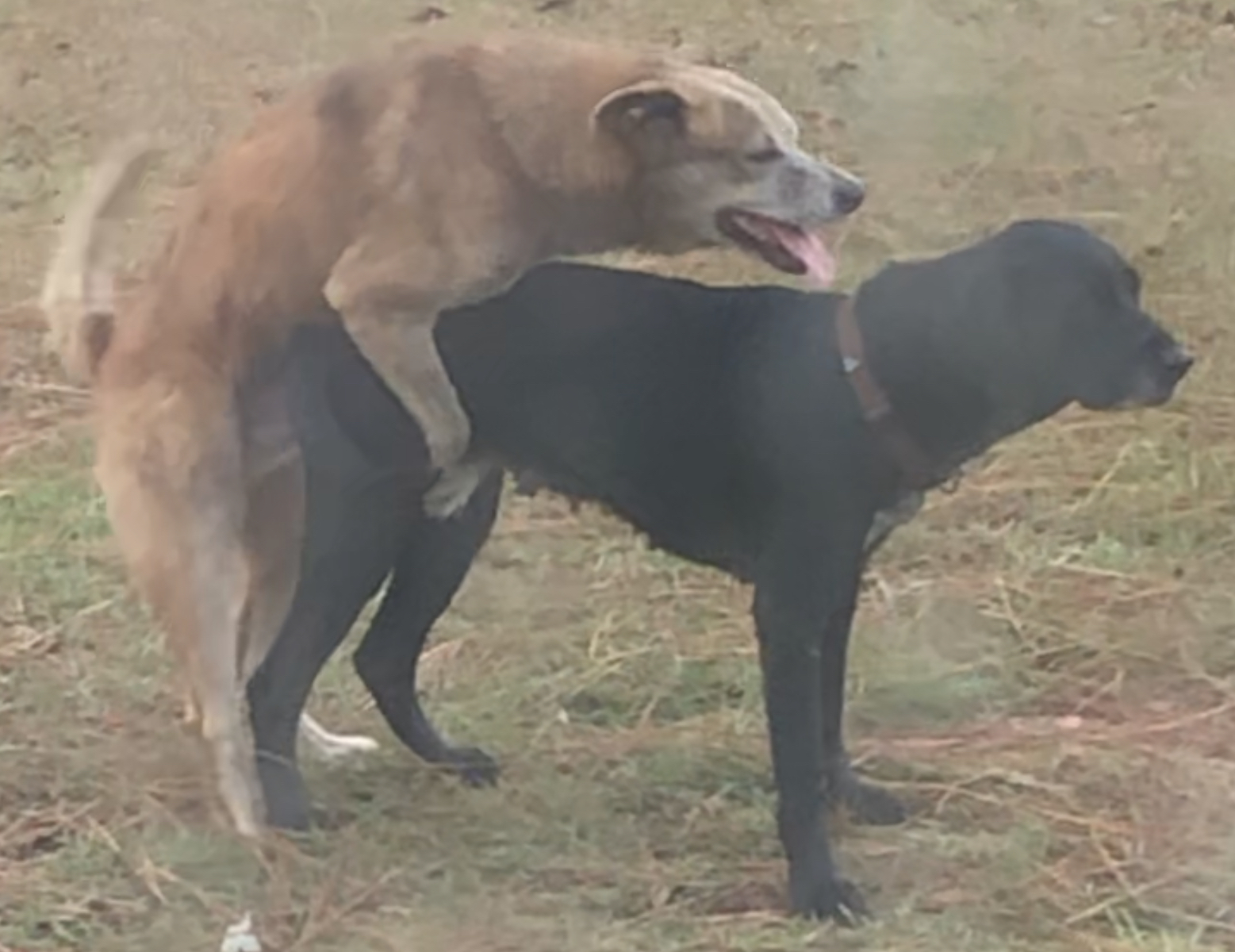
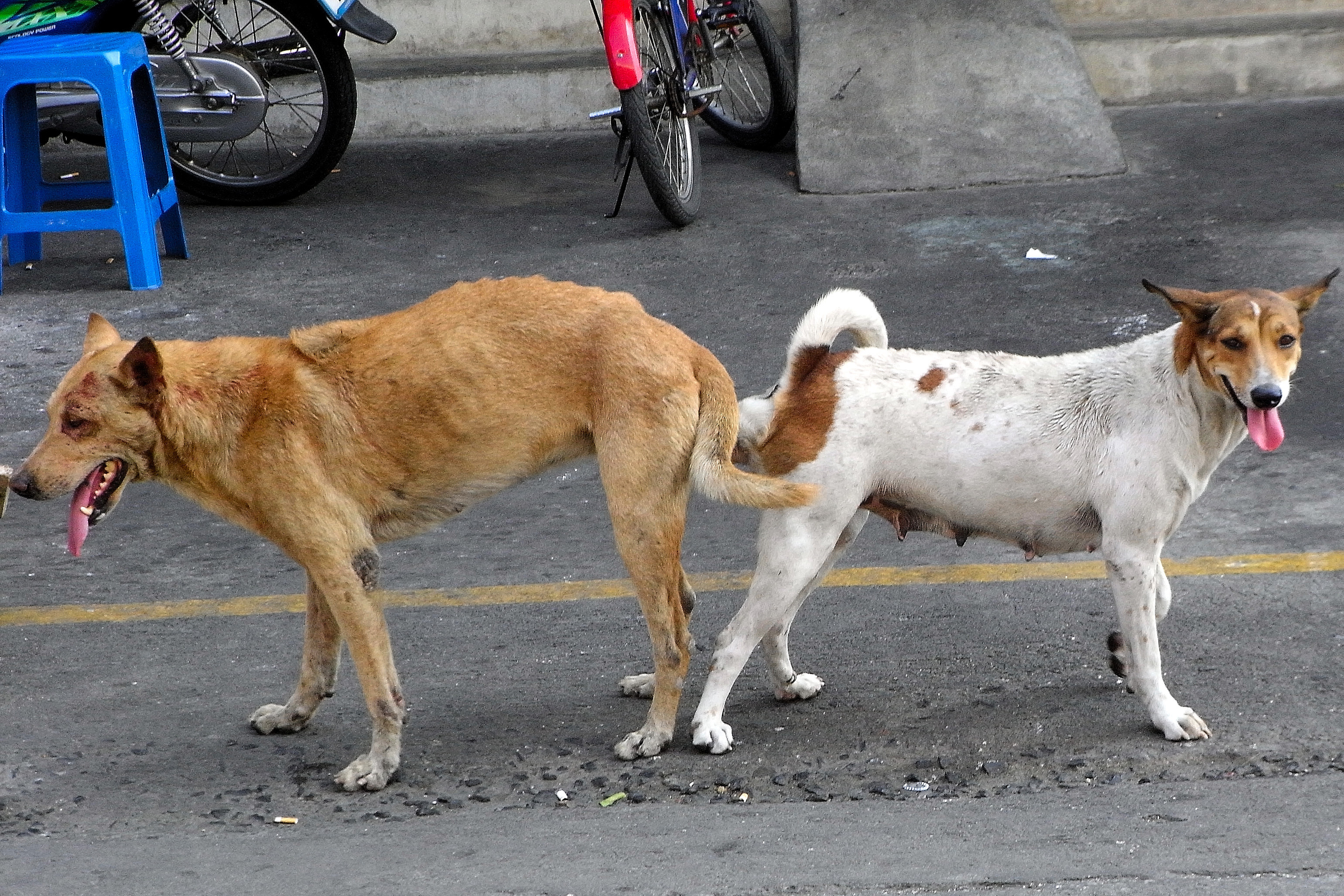
Copulating dogs

Although puppies do not have the urge to procreate, males sometimes engage in sexual play in the form of mounting. In some puppies, this behavior occurs as early as 3 or 4 weeks-of-age.

Dogs reach sexual maturity and can reproduce during their first year, in contrast to wolves at two years-of-age. Female dogs have their first estrus ("heat") at 6 to 12 months-of-age; smaller dogs tend to come into heat earlier whereas larger dogs take longer to mature.

Female dogs have an estrous cycle that is nonseasonal and monestrus, i.e. there is only one estrus per estrous cycle. The interval between one estrus and another is, on average, seven months, however, this may range between 4 and 12 months. This interestrous period is not influenced by the photoperiod or pregnancy. The average duration of estrus is 9 days with spontaneous ovulation usually about 3 days after the onset of estrus.

For several days before estrus, a phase called proestrus, the female dog may show greater interest in male dogs and "flirt" with them (proceptive behavior). There is progressive vulval swelling and some bleeding. If males try to mount a female dog during proestrus, she may avoid mating by sitting down or turning round and growling or snapping.

Estrous behavior in the female dog is usually indicated by her standing still with the tail held up, or to the side of the perineum, when the male sniffs the vulva and attempts to mount. This tail position is sometimes called "flagging". The female dog may also turn, presenting the vulva to the male.

The male dog mounts the female and is able to achieve intromission with a non-erect penis, which contains a bone called the os penis. The dog's penis enlarges inside the vagina, thereby preventing its withdrawal; this is sometimes known as the "tie" or "copulatory lock". The male dog rapidly thrust into the female for 1–2 minutes then dismounts with the erect penis still inside the vagina, and turns to stand rear-end to rear-end with the female dog for up to 30 to 40 minutes; the penis is twisted 180 degrees in a lateral plane. During this time, prostatic fluid is ejaculated.

The female dog can bear another litter within 8 months of the previous one. Dogs are polygamous in contrast to wolves that are generally monogamous. Therefore, dogs have no pair bonding and the protection of a single mate, but rather have multiple mates in a year. The consequence is that wolves put a lot of energy into producing a few pups in contrast to dogs that maximize the production of pups. This higher pup production rate enables dogs to maintain or even increase their population with a lower pup survival rate than wolves, and allows dogs a greater capacity than wolves to grow their population after a population crash or when entering a new habitat. It is proposed that these differences are an alternative breeding strategy, one adapted to a life of scavenging instead of hunting.

=== Parenting and early life ===
All of the wild members of the genus Canis display complex coordinated parental behaviors. Wolf pups are cared for primarily by their mother for the first 3 months of their life when she remains in the den with them while they rely on her milk for sustenance and her presence for protection. The father brings her food. Once they leave the den and can chew, the parents and pups from previous years regurgitate food for them. Wolf pups become independent by 5 to 8 months, although they often stay with their parents for years. In contrast, dog pups are cared for by the mother and rely on her for milk and protection but she gets no help from the father nor other dogs. Once pups are weaned around 10 weeks they are independent and receive no further maternal care.

== Behavior problems ==
There are many different types of behavioural issues that a dog can exhibit, including growling, snapping, barking, and invading a human's personal space. A survey of 203 dog owners in Melbourne, Australia, found that the main behaviour problems reported by owners were overexcitement (63%) and jumping up on people (56%). Some problems are related to attachment while others are neurological, as seen below.

=== Separation anxiety ===
When dogs are separated from humans, usually the owner, they often display behaviors which can be broken into the following four categories: exploratory behaviour, object play, destructive behaviour, and vocalization, and they are related to the canine's level of arousal. These behaviours may manifest as destructiveness, fecal or urinary elimination, hypersalivation or vocalization among other things. Dogs from single-owner homes are approximately 2.5 times more likely to have separation anxiety compared to dogs from multiple-owner homes. Furthermore, sexually intact dogs are only one third as likely to have separation anxiety as neutered dogs. The sex of dogs and whether there is another pet in the home do not have an effect on separation anxiety. It has been estimated that at least 14% of dogs examined at typical veterinary practices in the United States have shown signs of separation anxiety. Dogs that have been diagnosed with profound separation anxiety can be left alone for no more than a few minutes before they begin to panic and exhibit the behaviors associated with separation anxiety. Separation problems have been found to be linked to the dog's dependency on its owner, not because of disobedience. In the absence of treatment, affected dogs are often relinquished to a humane society or shelter, abandoned, or euthanized.

Environmental management, such as providing chew toys, background sound, or short pre-departure training sessions, can reduce anxiety in mild cases. Calming auditory environments, including specially composed music and soundscapes, have been used effectively to support dogs experiencing separation-related stress.

=== Resource guarding ===
Resource guarding is exhibited by many canines, and is one of the most commonly reported behaviour issues to canine professionals. It is seen when a dog uses specific behaviour patterns so that they can control access to an item, and the patterns are flexible when people are around. If a canine places value on some resource (i.e. food, toys, etc.) they may attempt to guard it from other animals as well as people, which leads to behavioural problems if not treated. The guarding can show in many different ways from rapid ingestion of food to using the body to shield items. It manifests as aggressive behaviour including, but not limited to, growling, barking, or snapping. Some dogs will also resource guard their owners and can become aggressive if the behaviour is allowed to continue. Owners must learn to interpret their dog's body language in order to try to judge the dog's reaction, as visual signals are used (i.e. changes in body posture, facial expression, etc.) to communicate feeling and response. These behaviours are commonly seen in shelter animals, most likely due to insecurities caused by a poor environment. Resource guarding is a concern since it can lead to aggression, but research has found that aggression over guarding can be contained by teaching the dog to drop the item they are guarding.

=== Jealousy ===
Canines are one of a number of non-human animals that can express jealousy towards other animals or animal-like objects. This emotion may feed into other behavioural problems, manifest as attention-seeking behaviour, withdrawing from social activity, or aggression towards their owner or another animal or person.

=== Noise anxiety ===
Canines often fear, and exhibit stress responses to, loud noises. Noise-related anxieties in dogs may be triggered by fireworks, thunderstorms, gunshots, and even loud or sharp bird noises. Associated stimuli may also come to trigger the symptoms of the phobia or anxiety, such as a change in barometric pressure being associated with a thunderstorm, thus causing an anticipatory anxiety.

=== Tail chasing ===
Tail chasing can be classified as a stereotypy. It falls under obsessive compulsive disorder, which is a neuropsychiatric disorder that can present in dogs as canine compulsive disorder. In one clinical study on this potential behavioral problem, 18 tail-chasing terriers were given clomipramine orally at a dosage of 1 to 2 mg/kg (0.5 to 0.9 mg/lb) of body weight, every 12 hours. Three of the dogs required treatment at a slightly higher dosage range to control tail chasing, however, after 1 to 12 weeks of treatment, 9 of 12 dogs were reported to have a 75% or greater reduction in tail chasing. Personality can also play a factor in tail chasing. Dogs who chase their tails have been found to be more shy than those who do not, and some dogs also show a lower level of response during tail chasing bouts.

== Behavior compared to other canids ==
Comparisons made within the wolf-like canids allow the identification of those behaviors that may have been inherited from common ancestry and those that may have been the result of domestication or other relatively recent environmental changes. Studies of free-ranging African Basenjis and New Guinea Singing Dogs indicate that their behavioral and ecological traits were the result of environmental selection pressures or selective breeding choices and not the result of artificial selection imposed by humans.

=== Early aggression ===
Dog pups show unrestrained fighting with their siblings from 2 weeks of age, with injury avoided only due to their undeveloped jaw muscles. This fighting gives way to play-chasing with the development of running skills at 4–5 weeks. Wolf pups possess more-developed jaw muscles from 2 weeks of age, when they first show signs of play-fighting with their siblings. Serious fighting occurs during 4–6 weeks of age. Compared to wolf and dog pups, golden jackal pups develop aggression at the age of 4–6 weeks when play-fighting frequently escalates into uninhibited biting intended to harm. This aggression ceases by 10–12 weeks when a hierarchy has formed.

=== Tameness ===
Unlike other domestic species which were primarily selected for production-related traits, dogs were initially selected for their behaviors. In 2016, a study found that there were only 11 fixed genes that showed variation between wolves and dogs. These gene variations were unlikely to have been the result of natural evolution, and indicate selection on both morphology and behavior during dog domestication. These genes have been shown to affect the catecholamine synthesis pathway, with the majority of the genes affecting the fight-or-flight response (i.e. selection for tameness), and emotional processing. Dogs generally show reduced fear and aggression compared to wolves. Some of these genes have been associated with aggression in some dog breeds, indicating their importance in both the initial domestication and then later in breed formation.

=== Social structure ===
Among canids, packs are the social units that hunt, rear young and protect a communal territory as a stable group and their members are usually related. Members of the feral dog group are usually not related. Feral dog groups are composed of a stable 2–6 members compared to the 2–15 member wolf pack whose size fluctuates with the availability of prey and reaches a maximum in winter time. The feral dog group consists of monogamous breeding pairs compared to the one breeding pair of the wolf pack. Agonistic behavior does not extend to the individual level and does not support a higher social structure compared to the ritualized agonistic behavior of the wolf pack that upholds its social structure. Feral pups have a very high mortality rate that adds little to the group size, with studies showing that adults are usually killed through accidents with humans, therefore other dogs need to be co-opted from villages to maintain stable group size.

=== Socialization ===
The critical period for socialization begins with walking and exploring the environment. Dog and wolf pups both develop the ability to see, hear and smell at 4 weeks of age. Dogs begin to explore the world around them at 4 weeks of age with these senses available to them, while wolves begin to explore at 2 weeks of age when they have the sense of smell but are functionally blind and deaf. The consequences of this is that more things are novel and frightening to wolf pups. The critical period for socialization closes with the avoidance of novelty, when the animal runs away from – rather than approaching and exploring – novel objects. For dogs this develops between 4 and 8 weeks of age. Wolves reach the end of the critical period after 6 weeks, after which it is not possible to socialize a wolf.

Dog puppies require as little as 90 minutes of contact with humans during their critical period of socialization to form a social attachment. This will not create a highly social pet but a dog that will solicit human attention. Wolves require 24 hours contact a day starting before 3 weeks of age. To create a socialized wolf the pups are removed from the den at 10 days of age, kept in constant human contact until they are 4 weeks old when they begin to bite their sleeping human companions, then spend only their waking hours in the presence of humans. This socialization process continues until age 4 months, when the pups can join other captive wolves but will require daily human contact to remain socialized. Despite this intensive socialization process, a well-socialized wolf will behave differently to a well-socialized dog and will display species-typical hunting and reproductive behaviors, only closer to humans than a wild wolf. These wolves do not generalize their socialization to all humans in the same manner as a socialized dog and they remain more fearful of novelty compared to socialized dogs.

In 1982, a study to observe the differences between dogs and wolves raised in similar conditions took place. The dog puppies preferred larger amounts of sleep at the beginning of their lives, while the wolf puppies were much more active. The dog puppies also preferred the company of humans, rather than their canine foster mother, though the wolf puppies were the exact opposite, spending more time with their foster mother. The dogs also showed a greater interest in the food given to them and paid little attention to their surroundings, while the wolf puppies found their surroundings to be much more intriguing than their food or food bowl. The wolf puppies were observed taking part in antagonistic play at a younger age, while the dog puppies did not display dominant/submissive roles until they were much older. The wolf puppies were rarely seen as being aggressive to each other or towards the other canines. On the other hand, the dog puppies were much more aggressive to each other and other canines, often seen full-on attacking their foster mother or one another.

A 2005 study comparing dog and wolf pups concluded that extensively socialised dogs as well as unsocialised dog pups showed greater attachment to a human owner than wolf pups did, even if the wolf was socialised. The study concluded that dogs may have evolved a capacity for attachment to humans functionally analogous to that human infants display.

=== Cognition ===
Despite claims that dogs show more human-like social cognition than wolves, several recent studies have demonstrated that if wolves are properly socialized to humans and have the opportunity to interact with humans regularly, then they too can succeed on some human-guided cognitive tasks, in some cases out-performing dogs at an individual level. Similar to dogs, wolves can also follow more complex point types made with body parts other than the human arm and hand (e.g. elbow, knee, foot). Both dogs and wolves have the cognitive capacity for prosocial behavior toward humans; however it is not guaranteed. For canids to perform well on traditional human-guided tasks (e.g. following the human point) both relevant lifetime experiences with humans – including socialization to humans during the critical period for social development – and opportunities to associate human body parts with certain outcomes (such as food being provided by human hands, a human throwing or kicking a ball, etc.) are required.

After undergoing training to solve a simple manipulation task, dogs that are faced with an insoluble version of the same problem look at the human, while socialized wolves do not.

=== Reproduction ===
Dogs reach sexual maturity and can reproduce during their first year in contrast to a wolf at two years. The female dog can bear another litter within 8 months of the last one. The canid genus is influenced by the photoperiod and generally reproduces in the springtime. Domestic dogs are not reliant on seasonality for reproduction in contrast to the wolf, coyote, Australian dingo and African basenji that may have only one, seasonal, estrus each year. Feral dogs are influenced by the photoperiod with around half of the breeding females mating in the springtime, which is thought to indicate an ancestral reproductive trait not overcome by domestication, as can be inferred from wolves and Cape hunting dogs.

Domestic dogs are polygamous in contrast to wolves that are generally monogamous. Therefore, domestic dogs have no pair bonding and the protection of a single mate, but rather have multiple mates in a year. There is no paternal care in dogs as opposed to wolves where all pack members assist the mother with the pups. The consequence is that wolves put a lot of energy into producing a few pups in contrast to dogs that maximize the production of pups. This higher pup production rate enables dogs to maintain or even increase their population with a lower pup survival rate than wolves, and allows dogs a greater capacity than wolves to grow their population after a population crash or when entering a new habitat. It is proposed that these differences are an alternative breeding strategy adapted to a life of scavenging instead of hunting. In contrast to domestic dogs, feral dogs are monogamous. Domestic dogs tend to have a litter size of 10, wolves 3, and feral dogs 5–8. Feral pups have a very high mortality rate with only 5% surviving at the age of one year, and sometimes the pups are left unattended making them vulnerable to predators. Domestic dogs stand alone among all canids for a total lack of paternal care.

Dogs differ from wolves and most other large canid species as they generally do not regurgitate food for their young, nor the young of other dogs in the same territory. However, this difference was not observed in all domestic dogs. Regurgitating of food by the females for the young, as well as care for the young by the males, has been observed in domestic dogs, dingos and in feral or semi-feral dogs. In one study of a group of free-ranging dogs, for the first 2 weeks immediately after parturition the lactating females were observed to be more aggressive to protect the pups. The male parents were in contact with the litters as 'guard' dogs for the first 6–8 weeks of the litters' life. In absence of the mothers, they were observed to prevent the approach of strangers by vocalizations or even by physical attacks. Moreover, one male fed the litter by regurgitation showing the existence of paternal care in some free-roaming dogs.

=== Space ===
Space used by feral dogs is not dissimilar from most other canids in that they use defined traditional areas (home ranges) that tend to be defended against intruders, and have core areas where most of their activities are undertaken. Urban domestic dogs have a home range of 2-61 hectares, in contrast to a feral dog's home range of 58 square kilometers. Wolf home ranges vary from 78 square kilometers where prey is deer, to 2.5 square kilometers at higher latitudes where prey is moose and caribou. Wolves will defend their territory based on prey abundance and pack density, but feral dogs will defend their home ranges all year. Where wolf ranges and feral dog ranges overlap, the feral dogs will site their core areas closer to human settlement.

=== Predation and scavenging ===
Despite claims in the popular press, studies could not find evidence of a single predation on cattle by feral dogs. However, domestic dogs were responsible for the death of 3 calves over one 5-year study. Other studies in Europe and North America indicate moderate limited success in the consumption of wild boar, deer and other ungulates, however it could not be determined if this was predation or scavenging on carcasses. A new study has shown though that these were most likely due to predation.

Feral dogs, like their ancestors do participate in pup rearing. Several studies show that feral dogs are not primarily scavengers, despite claims in the popular press. Studies in the modern era show that their diet is very opportunistic, ranging from garbage, carrion to live prey. The primary feature that distinguishes feral from domestic dogs is the degree of reliance or dependence on humans, and in some respect, their behavior toward people. Feral dogs survive and reproduce independently of human intervention or assistance. While it is true that some feral dogs use human garbage for food, others acquire their primary subsistence by hunting and scavenging like other wild canids. Dogs may resort to hunting more than garbage consuming when their garbage food source is scarce. Even well-fed domestic dogs are prone to scavenge; gastro-intestinal veterinary visits increase during warmer weather as dogs are prone to eat decaying material. Some dogs consume feces, which may contain nutrition. On occasion well-fed dogs have been known to scavenge their owners' corpses.

== Dogs in human society ==
Studies using an operant framework have indicated that humans can influence the behavior of dogs through food, petting and voice. Food and 20–30 seconds of petting maintained operant responding in dogs. Some dogs will show a preference for petting once food is readily available, and dogs will remain in proximity to a person providing petting and show no satiation to that stimulus. Petting alone was sufficient to maintain the operant response of military dogs to voice commands, and responses to basic obedience commands in all dogs increased when only vocal praise was provided for correct responses.

A study using dogs that were trained to remain motionless while unsedated and unrestrained in an MRI scanner exhibited caudate activation to a hand signal associated with reward. Further work found that the magnitude of the canine caudate response is similar to that of humans, while the between-subject variability in dogs may be less than humans. In a further study, 5 scents were presented (self, familiar human, strange human, familiar dog, strange dog). While the olfactory bulb/peduncle was activated to a similar degree by all the scents, the caudate was activated maximally to the familiar human. Importantly, the scent of the familiar human was not the handler, meaning that the caudate response differentiated the scent in the absence of the person being present. The caudate activation suggested that not only did the dogs discriminate that scent from the others, they had a positive association with it. Although these signals came from two different people, the humans lived in the same household as the dog and therefore represented the dog's primary social circle. And while dogs should be highly tuned to the smell of items that are not comparable, it seems that the "reward response" is reserved for their humans.

Research has shown that there are individual differences in the interactions between dogs and their human that have significant effects on dog behavior. In 1997, a study showed that the type of relationship between dog and master, characterized as either companionship or working relationship, significantly affected the dog's performance on a cognitive problem-solving task. They speculate that companion dogs have a more dependent relationship with their owners, and look to them to solve problems. In contrast, working dogs are more independent.

=== Dogs in the family ===
In 2013, a study produced the first evidence under controlled experimental observation for a correlation between the owner's personality and their dog's behaviour.

=== Dogs at work ===
Service dogs are those that are trained to help people with disabilities such as blindness, epilepsy, diabetes and autism. Detection dogs are trained to using their sense of smell to detect substances such as explosives, illegal drugs, wildlife scat, or blood. In science, dogs have helped humans understand about the conditioned reflex. Attack dogs, dogs that have been trained to attack on command, are employed in security, police, and military roles. Service dog programs have been established to help individuals suffering from Post Traumatic Stress Disorder (PTSD) and have shown to have positive results.

== Attacks ==
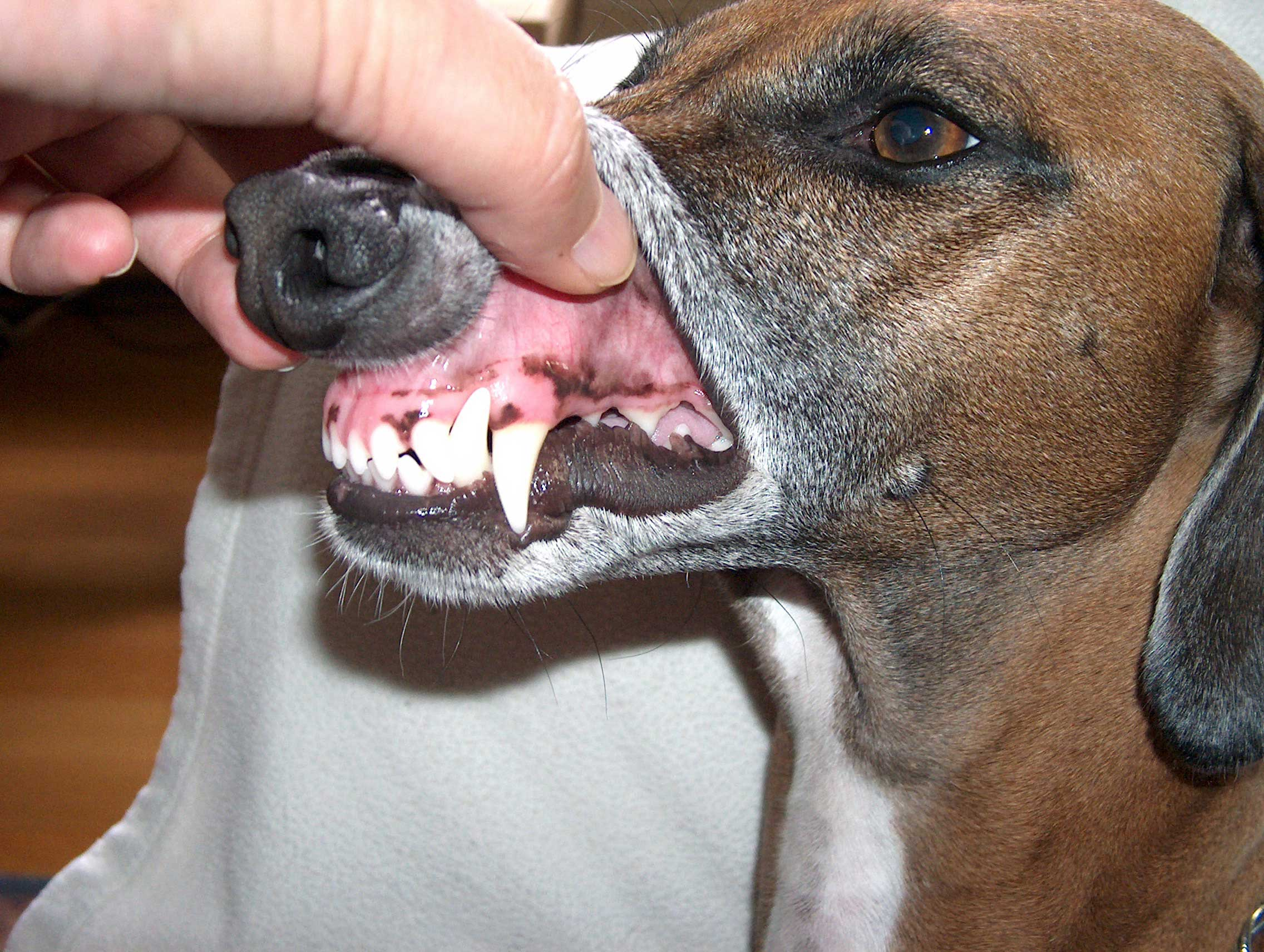
A dog's teeth can inflict serious injuries.

The human-dog relationship is based on unconditional trust; however, if this trust is lost it will be difficult to reinstate.

In the UK between 2005 and 2013, there were 17 fatal dog attacks. In 2007–08, there were 4,611 hospital admissions due to dog attacks, which increased to 5,221 in 2008–09. It was estimated in 2013 that more than 200,000 people a year are bitten by dogs in England, with the annual cost to the National Health Service of treating injuries about £3 million. A report published in 2014 stated there were 6,743 hospital admissions specifically caused by dog bites, a 5.8% increase from the 6,372 admissions in the previous 12 months.

In the US between 1979 and 1996, there were more than 300 human dog bite-related fatalities. In the US in 2013, there were 31 dog-bite related deaths. Each year, more than 4.5 million people in the US are bitten by dogs and almost 1 in 5 require medical attention. A dog's thick fur protects it from the bite of another dog, but humans are furless and are not so protected.

Attack training is condemned by some as promoting ferocity in dogs; a 1975 American study showed that 10% of dogs that have bitten a person received attack dog training at some point.

== Genetic basis of dog behavior ==
It is well established that simple genetic architecture underlies the morphological differences in dog breeds, but the underlying genetic impact of domestic canine behavior is more commonly disputed.

Advances in genetic research have found associations between certain behavioral traits and gene regions in domestic dogs, this shines a light on breed specific tendencies or behaviors.

Early studies in the genetics of breed specific behaviors in the in herding dogs in the 1940s concluded that 'showing eye' and 'bark' behaviors do not follow simple Mendelian inheritance. Decades later the same conclusion has been reached for all studied behaviors, but the complex modes of inheritance have not been completely deciphered. Like human behavior, canine behavior is a result of the interactions between the protein products coded for by genes, and the environment in which the organism lives.

The first study to identify a specific locus associated with a behavioral phenotype in dogs (with genome wide significance) was in 2010, when they found that allelic variation in the cdh2 gene were linked to compulsive behavioral phenotypes. A 2019 genome wide association study concluded that a large proportion of behavioral variance across breeds is attributable to genetic factors. Within breeds, the most heritable traits include characteristics selected for in breeding such as trainability, stranger directed aggression, chasing, and attachment/attention seeking. Another study that compared breed data from C-BARQ, to daily behavioral patterns concluded that separation anxiety and owner directed aggression were the only two out of nine traits not found to have significant heritability. Meanwhile, agitation, attention seeking, barking, excitability, fetching, human/object fear, noise fear, non-owner aggression, and trainability were found to have a genetic basis.

Genes containing SNPs associated with dog behavior are likely to be expressed in the brain, contributing to pathways related to the development and expression of behavior and cognition (i.e. they influence behavioral processes through expression in the brain). Examples of chromosome loci for putative SNPs and their associated traits include:

Attach & Attention Seeking	chr34_19778169
Chasing	chr32_4513202
Dog Aggression	chr20_29700107
Dog Fear	chr1_96469867
Dog Rivalry	chr10_43493767
Energy	chr38_1286873
Excitability	chr9_52449334
Nonsocial Fear	chr8_40424847
Owner Aggression	chr18_26274094
Separation Problems	chr3_9599516
Stranger Aggression	chr1_81065940
Stranger Fear	chr1_81065940
Touch Sensitivity	chr5_28225323
Trainability	chr31_2974937

Geneticists continue to explore candidate genes that are responsible for the regulation of neurotransmitters, specifically dopamine and serotonin, as major differences in their concentration, receptivity, and binding ability are linked to behavioral disorders. For example, attachment and attention seeking behaviors were linked to genes associated with dopamine transport and metabolism. Like some physical diseases, it is conceivable that similar presentation of behavioral traits across breeds could be caused by several different kinds of mutations, and conversely, mutations of the same genes could result in diverse phenotypes. For example, studies have found that certain loci associated breed differences in stranger-directed aggression were associated with SNPs in GRM8, a gene that codes for glutamate receptor, one of the major excitatory neurotransmitters in the central nervous system. Allelic variation in another glutamate receptor gene, slc1a2 has been associated with increased stranger directed aggression in Shiba inus, and in higher activity levels in Labrador retrievers. SNPs in PDE7B, a gene that functions in dopaminergic pathways, was also associated with breed differences in aggression.

Additionally, it has been discovered that there are common genetic mechanisms for individual differences in social behavior between dogs and humans. For example, the structural variation in the GTF2I and GTF2IRD1 genes at the locus responsible for Williams-Beuren Syndrome in humans is also associated with hypersociability in dogs. Genes associated with temperament and startle response in humans such as OTORD and CACNA1C, were linked to breed differences in fear/fear response. Genes associated with aggression in dogs have been linked to aggressive behavior in humans including CPNE4 and OPCML. Frequency of energetic, boisterous and playful behavior include genes previously linked to resting heart rate, daytime rest, and sleep duration in humans such as TMEM132D, AGMO, SNX29, and CACNA2D3.Trainability has been previously associated with intelligence and information processing speed genes ERG, SNX29, CSMD2, and ATRNL1. CAMKMT, a gene relating to stranger fear in dogs is also associated with anxiety in humans.

At present, there are still limitations to understanding the genetic basis for canine behavior including inconsistent phenotyping methods strong environmental/developmental influence on behavior, and a lack of international collaboration.

== See also ==
- Alpha roll
- Dog communication
- Dog intelligence
- Calming signals
- Pack (canine)
- Pack hunter
- Separation anxiety disorder (humans)
- Temperament test
