= Boxerstock =

Coordinates: 33°53′48″N 84°35′25″W

- Dates: Annually, Late October (10/23/16)
- Location: Marietta, GA
- Years active: 2008-2016
- Website: http://www.boxerstock.org

Boxerstock was an all-day music festival, benefiting Atlanta Boxer Rescue. Boxerstock was founded in 2008 and was held every fall in Marietta, Georgia. It featured an entire day of live music from local and nationally known performers. It was a family event and although the event supports the rescue and rehabilitation of Boxers, dogs of all breeds were welcome.

== History of Boxerstock ==
Boxerstock 2008 was held at ParkGrounds, a local coffee shop with a dog park attached. This unique venue provided a good setting for the festival to get its start. Atlanta's own Caroline Aiken and Trances Arc were the headliners. The festival was ten hours long and featured twelve regional musical artists and bands.

Boxerstock 2009 was held at Dogma Dog Care. The benefit concert drew hundreds from Atlanta and surrounding areas. Local favorites such as Thomas Tillman, RubberJean, and Tori Bigelow performed.

Boxerstock 2010: In 2010, Boxerstock moved to its current location at the North Georgia State Fairgrounds at Jim Miller Park in Marietta, Georgia. Headliners included State of Man; Atlanta's guitar legend, Barry Richman; Rock Star INXS contestant, Heather Luttrell; American Idol finalist Anna Kaelin, and other local talent. Over 1200 people attended the event.

Boxerstock 2011 featured seven bands: Course of Virtue, Sean Waterman, The Greg Burroughs Band, Kick The Robot, JK and the Lost Boys, Jeff Robinson with the Barry Richman Band and The Michelle Malone Banned. Victoria Stilwell from Animal Planet's "It's Me or the Dog presented, as well as local veterinarians from Paces Ferry Veterinary Clinic and trainers from K-9 Coach. The festival drew over 1500 people in 2011.

Boxerstock 2012 featured six bands: Davin McCoy, Erik Smallwood, The Deadfields, JP Blues Band, 10 Miles of Blue, and Kick the Robot. Speakers included local veterinarians from Paces Ferry Veterinary Clinic and trainers from K-9 Coach.

Boxerstock 2013 featured seven bands on the main stage and many more on the side stage. Featured bands were Caryn Womack, Shameless Dave & The Miracle Whips, The Daniels Brothers Band, Tom Dixon, Lisa Torres, Them Morris Boys, and Man Made Band. Shelly Ryan was the Emcee on the main stage and Kathy Reed on the side stage. Speakers included veterinarians from Paces Ferry Veterinary Clinic and trainers from K-9 Coach. Notable events from 2013 included obedience and nose work demonstrations, a frisbee demo, kids and dogs halloween costume contests, and agility demonstrations. This years event also featured the addition of food trucks.

Boxerstock 2014 was held at Jim Miller Park in Marietta, Georgia on Sunday October 19, 2014 from 12-6pm. Featured bands on the main stage included American Idol Top 4 Finalist Jessica Meuse, plus Chris Nathan, JP Blues, Tiger Creek Band, Stolen Hearts, Larry Griffith and Megan Fowler. The side stage featured many up and coming young artists from the greater Atlanta area. Presenters included local veterinarians from Paces Ferry Veterinary Clinic and Amber Burckhalter, Certified Master Trainer and animal behavior consultant and renowned expert in canine obedience and behavior modification. Presenting sponsors for 2014 were Paces Ferry Veterinary Clinic and Unleashed by Petco.

Boxerstock 2015 was held at Jim Miller Park in Marietta, Georgia on Sunday October 11, 2015 from 12-6pm. Featured bands on the main stage included Laughlin, Justin Dukes, Cody Matlock, Falling Through April, TheSAGAS and Cumberland Blue. The side stage will feature many up and coming young artists from the greater Atlanta area. Speakers included local veterinarians from Paces Ferry Veterinary Clinic and Amber Burckhalter, Certified Master Trainer and Animal Behavior Consultant and renowned expert in canine obedience and behavior modification. Presenting sponsors for 2015 were Paces Ferry Veterinary Clinic and Unleashed by Petco.

Boxerstock 2016 was again held at Jim Miller Park in Marietta, Georgia on Sunday October 23, 2015 from 12-6pm. Featured bands on the main stage include Apostles of Soul, Kurt Thomas, Cody Matlock, Yacht Rock Schooner and Chequered Blue. The side stage featured fifteen up and coming young artists from the greater Atlanta area, including Liz Kate and Ella Collier. Presenters include internationally known dog trainer Victoria Stilwell from Animal Planet's "It's Me or the Dog plus local veterinarians from Paces Ferry Veterinary Clinic and Amber Burckhalter, Certified Master Trainer and Animal Behavior Consultant and renowned expert in canine obedience and behavior modification. Presenting sponsor for 2016 is Paces Ferry Veterinary Clinic and contributing sponsors include Petco, North Georgia Veterinary Referral Practice, K-9 Coach/Bed & Bark, C & C Fence Company, Courier Express and DaLee & Company, Inc..

Boxerstock was discontinued after 2016 because Jim Miller Park, where it was most recently held, was undergoing reconstruction.

== About Atlanta Boxer Rescue ==
Atlanta Boxer Rescue is a non-profit rescue organization that strives to rescue, rehabilitate, and re-home unwanted and abandoned Boxers within the greater Atlanta area as well as providing education to pet owners. Atlanta Boxer Rescue works to inform people about the realities of pet guardianship, promote spaying/neutering, and encourage responsible care of the Boxer to enhance the lives of pet owners and their companion animals. Atlanta Boxer Rescue, Inc., is 501(c)(3) non-profit organization.
