= Skateboarding dog =

Cultural phenomena

There are several skateboarding dogs whose exploits have been featured on television, websites, and other media. Skateboarding dog stories are commonly used at the end of news bulletins as human interest stories. Bulldogs are especially good at this activity as they have a low centre of gravity and wide body.

== Notable skateboarding dogs ==
Such dogs have been featured on television, such as in the MTV show Rob and Big. One skateboarding dog named Tyson appeared in this show and has since been featured on many websites as the pioneer of skateboarding dogs. Another bulldog, Tillman, has appeared in Greatest American Dog. Tillman holds the Guinness World Record for "Fastest 100 m on a skateboard by a dog."

Chowder, an English bulldog from Oregon, began skateboarding after a chance encounter with a skimboard on the beach. He has since appeared in videos shared on TikTok, with over 800,000 followers.

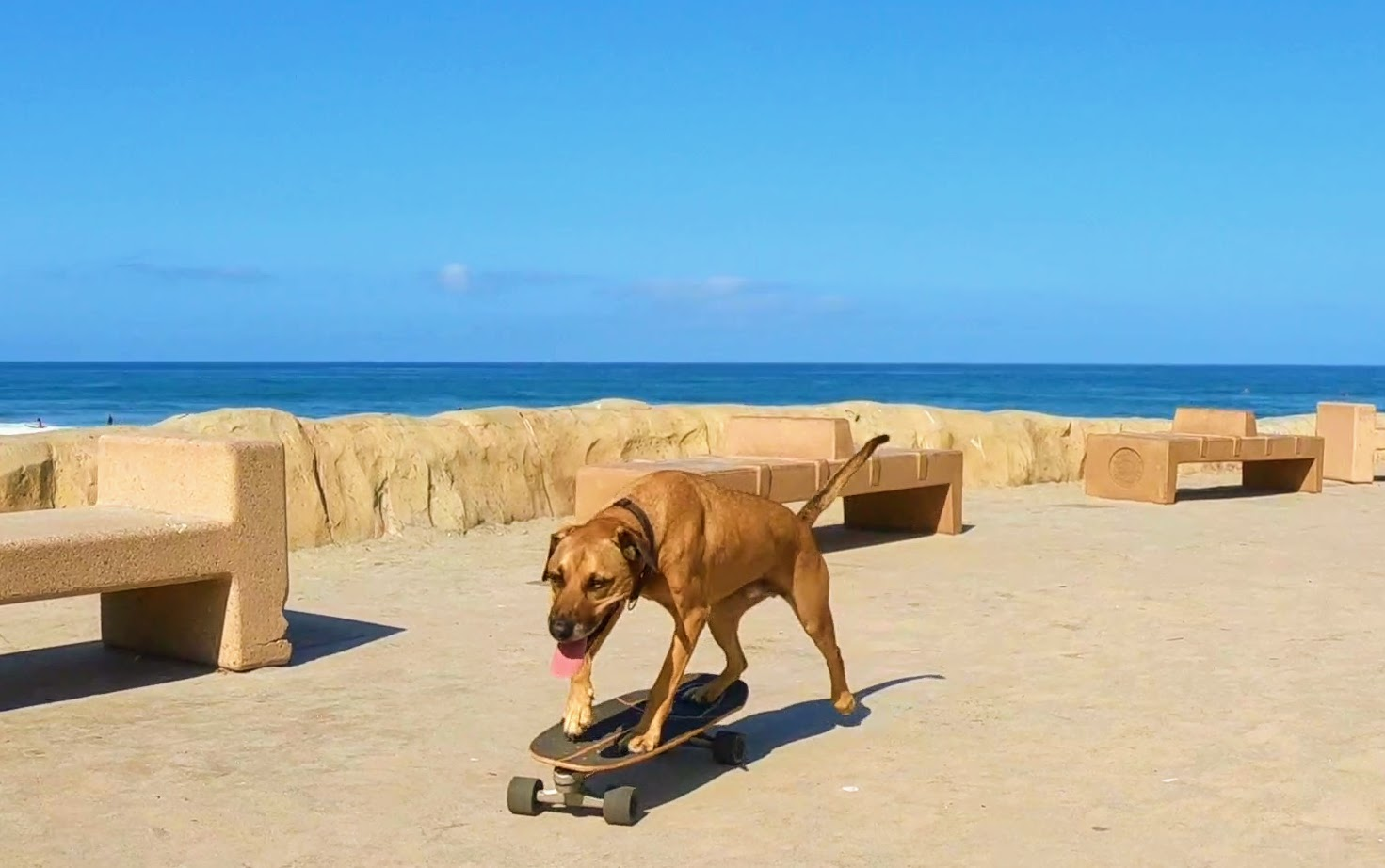
Bamboo skateboarding at Seaside in Cardiff-by-the-Sea

Bamboo (October 14, 2011 – January 5, 2026) was a mixed-breed rescue dog from San Diego County who skateboarded through the coastal communities of Solana Beach and Cardiff-by-the-Sea. Born in a litter of nine to a stray in a cave near San Bernardino, he was adopted at eight weeks old and learned to skateboard alongside his owner during morning walks. He developed the ability to propel himself using his hind legs, steer, and navigate the sidewalks along Highway 101 in Solana Beach, becoming a familiar sight around town. Videos of Bamboo skating show a dog fully in control, shifting his weight through turns, scanning ahead, and maintaining a relaxed posture. "It's pretty much the happiest dog I've ever seen," one passerby told Inside Edition in 2016. A 2015 video received over 25 million views in four days after being shared on Facebook, and he was featured by ABC7, NBC San Diego, and Inside Edition.

== See also ==
- Dog surfing
- Skateboarding duck
- Animal training
