= Victoria Stilwell =

English TV presenter and dog trainer (born 1969)

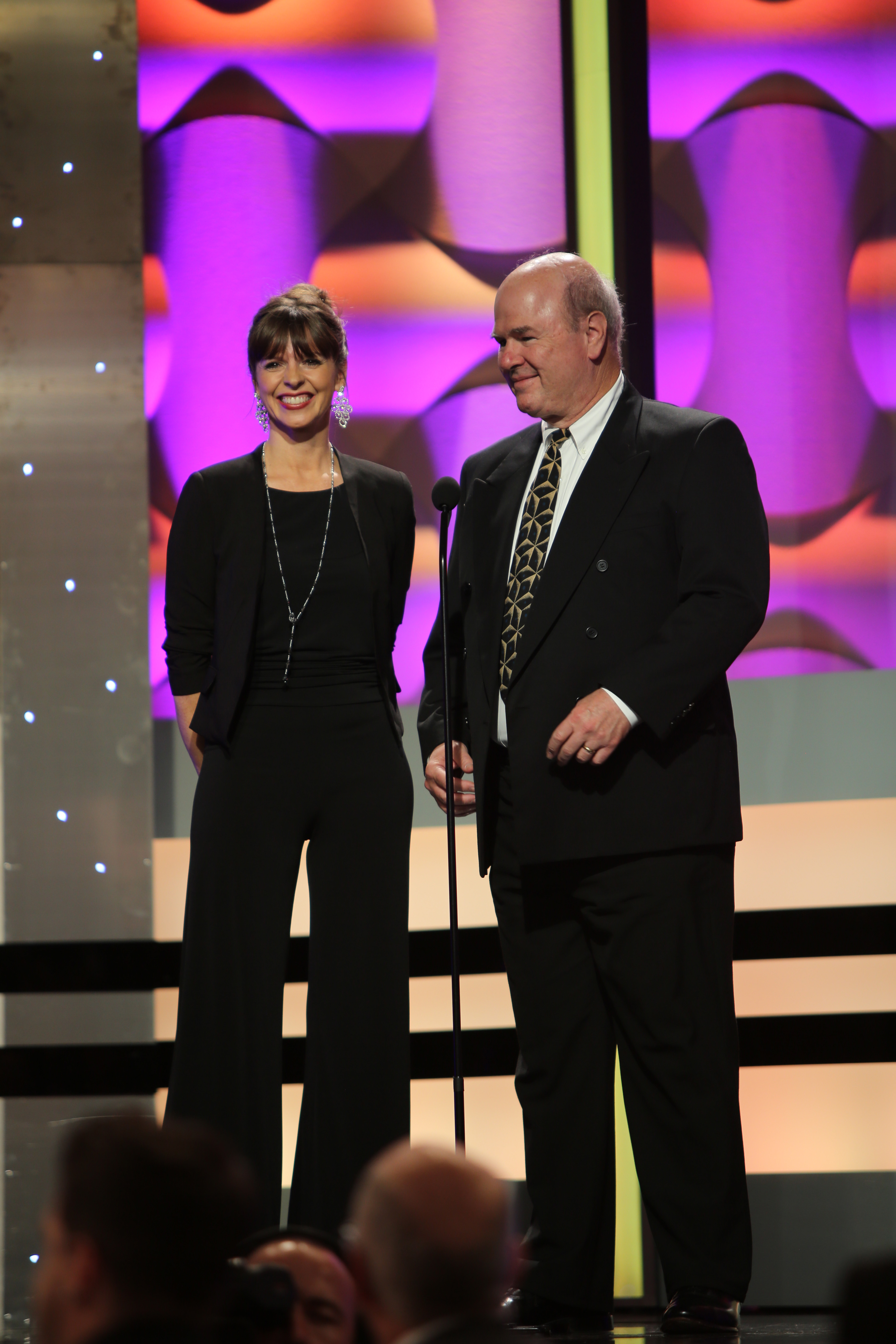
- Stilwell, alongside Larry Miller, in 2014
- Born: 20 July 1969 (age 57); Wimbledon, London, England, UK
- Occupations: Dog trainer, television presenter, author, actress
- Years active: 1995–present
- Employer(s): Animal Planet, Channel 4, CBS
- Known for: It's Me or the Dog; Greatest American Dog
- Height: 5 ft 6 in (1.68 m)
- Spouse: Van Zeiler
- Children: 1
- Website: positively.com

Victoria Stilwell (born 20 July 1969) is an English author, dog trainer and television presenter. Stilwell has appeared as a pet behavior expert and served as a producer on several international TV series including Dogs Might Fly (Sky TV), Dogs With Extraordinary Jobs (Smithsonian Channel), and Greatest American Dog (CBS), and is best known as the star and creator of the dog training TV show It's Me or the Dog.

Stilwell is a leading proponent of positive reinforcement-based dog training tools and methods to provide pet behavior advice instead of traditional methods which typically employ multiple approaches including the use of pain, fear and intimidation. She is the Editor-In-Chief of the Positively.com website, the founder and president of the Victoria Stilwell Academy for Dog Training & Behavior, the CEO of the Victoria Stilwell Positively Dog Training (VSPDT) network of dog trainers, and other dog behavior institutions.

== Career ==
Stilwell originally trained as an actress, playing roles in ITV1's The Bill in 1994, and onstage in London's West End theatre, as well as several commercials and voiceovers. She received a BA honours degree in Theatre from Middlesex University. In order to supplement her income as an actress, Stilwell's veterinary nurse sister suggested that she start a dog walking agency. She then expanded her focus to dog training and after moving to the United States with her husband in 1999, Stilwell co-founded several dog training companies up and down the East Coast.

Stilwell is currently certified by the Animal Behaviour and Training Associates, and is a longtime member of the US Association of Pet Dog Trainers (APDT).

== Charitable work ==
Stilwell created the Victoria Stilwell Foundation, whose mission is "to provide financial support and canine behaviour expertise to assistance dog organisations and small animal rescue shelters while promoting the concept of reward-based, positive reinforcement dog training philosophies in organisations and households throughout the United States."

Stilwell works with animal rescue organizations around the world, serving as a behavior adviser for shelters in Atlanta, New York, the United Kingdom and Hong Kong while giving regular seminars on the subject of dog rescue, training and rehabilitation. She has been involved in animal welfare and protection organizations on the international stage, including serving as an Advisory Board Member of RedRover and a National Ambassador for American Humane. She also worked as a volunteer adoption counselor for the ASPCA.

== Media ==
=== It's Me or the Dog ===
From 2005 to 2012 and 2021-2022 Stilwell worked with unruly dogs on her TV show, It's Me or the Dog, which has aired in over 125 countries and is also available on YouTube. The show features Stilwell as she counsels families with problem pets and uses positive reinforcement training techniques to help them learn how to correct their dogs' behaviour. Originally produced for Channel 4 in the UK, the show premiered in the US on Animal Planet in April 2007, and over 110 episodes have been aired worldwide. A typical episode involves a family struggling to cope with their misbehaving dog(s). Stilwell initially observes the problems on site, and then presents the family with her opinion regarding the causes of the issues. She then works with the family and their dogs to restore balance.

=== Dogs With Extraordinary Jobs ===
Dogs With Extraordinary Jobs is a TV series, created, co-produced and narrated by Stilwell for Blue Ant Media (syndicated worldwide including the Smithsonian Channel in the US) in 2018 and 2019. Each episode highlights the extraordinary work of dogs around the world as they assist humans.

=== Dogs Might Fly ===
Stilwell served as one of three judges and behaviour experts on the 2016 Sky TV series Dogs Might Fly. The series tracked several rescue dogs from UK animal shelters as they worked with dog trainers to determine if one of them could learn to co-pilot a small airplane.

=== Greatest American Dog ===
Stilwell was one of three judges on the CBS show Greatest American Dog, in which 12 dog-owner teams compete for the title 'Greatest American Dog' and a $250,000 prize. The series debuted on CBS 10 July 2008.

=== Positively Dog Training - the Official Victoria Stilwell Podcast ===
Stilwell created a podcast called Positively Dog Training - the Official Victoria Stilwell Podcast, available on iTunes and all other major podcast providers. With co-host Holly Firfer (CNN), Stilwell discusses the latest news and trends in the pet world, answers fans' questions about dog training and behavior, and interviews special guests about the pet industry and beyond.

=== Other media appearances ===
Stilwell has been featured in numerous magazines and journals including The New York Times, USA Today, Cosmopolitan, the Daily Mail, MSNBC.com, Oprah Magazine, Self Magazine, Psychology Today and more. She has been a regular columnist for The Bark, Dog World, American Dog and Dogs Today magazines, and she has appeared on numerous talk shows, news broadcasts and radio shows in the US, Europe and Asia as a dog training and pet behavior expert. She is the resident pet expert for CNN's HLN network and the BBC's The One Show, and she has been seen on multiple international broadcasts. She has also appeared in The Dog Academy.

== Awards ==
Stilwell was honored with the "Excellence in Journalism and Outstanding Contributions to the Pet Industry" award at the 2011 Global Pet Expo and was named 'Dog Trainer of the Year' by Dog World magazine at the 55th Annual Purina Pro Plan Show Dogs of the Year Awards. She was named among 2009's '100 Best & Brightest' in the dog world in The Bark magazine. Stilwell won a 2009 CableFax award as Best Host in the Animals & Nature category. In 2009, It's Me or the Dog was nominated for a People's Choice Award in the US, and after its first season in the UK, It's Me or the Dog was nominated in the 'Best Factual Entertainment' category in the UK's TV Quick Awards. Her first book, It's Me or the Dog: How to Have the Perfect Pet, was voted one of the 50 greatest dog books ever written by Dogs Today magazine.

== Campaigns ==
Stilwell serves on the boards of several animal-related institutions including Canine Assistants, RedRover, DogTV, Greyhound Rescue of West England, Grey Muzzle, the Soi Dog Foundation, and the W-Underdogs. She advocates animal rescue and has supported Paws Atlanta, Atlanta Pet Rescue, Stray from the Heart (NYC), Hong Kong Dog Rescue, Wisconsin Puppy Mill Project, the Waterside Action Group, Deed Not Breed (campaigning to re-write the UK's Dangerous Dogs Act to remove breed-specific legislation) as well as Vets Get Scanning, promoting mandatory pet microchipping and scanning by vets.

== Personal life ==
Stilwell met her husband, actor Van Zeiler, while starring opposite him in the West End theatre production of Buddy - The Buddy Holly Story. The couple and their daughter live in Atlanta, Georgia.

After many years without a pet dog of her own (due to the international travel schedule required for her various TV shows), Stilwell adopted a rescued chocolate Labrador named Sadie. In early 2011, Stilwell fostered a Chihuahua/Miniature Pinscher mix named Jasmine and decided to adopt her. Following Sadie's death at the age of 15 in 2018, Stilwell adopted an elderly mixed breed dog named Bella. Prior to that, she had spent her time since 2000 fostering dogs due to be euthanised by local municipal shelters. Stilwell and her husband then gave the dogs a home while rehabilitating them and eventually finding suitable homes for the animals. She has explained that until her international travel requirements were reduced, owning a dog would have been irresponsible and unfair to the dog, considering how much the whole family travels. The family has re-homed over 50 dogs and cats.

Stilwell is a critic of fox hunting and was among more than 20 high-profile people who signed a letter to Members of Parliament in 2015 to oppose Conservative prime minister David Cameron's plan to amend the Hunting Act 2004.

== Bibliography ==
- Stilwell, Victoria. (2007). It's Me or the Dog: Fat Dog Slim, How to Have a Healthy, Happy Pet. London: Collins. ISBN 978-0-00-724920-6. OCLC 71807700.
- Stilwell, Victoria. (2007). It's Me or the Dog: How to Have the Perfect Pet (1st U.S. ed.). New York: Hyperion. ISBN 978-1-4013-0855-1. OCLC 80643924.
- Stilwell, Victoria. (19 March 2013). Train Your Dog Positively: Understand Your Dog and Solve Common Behavior Problems including Separation Anxiety, Excessive Barking, Aggression, Housetraining, Leash Pulling, and More! (First ed.). New York. ISBN 978-1-60774-414-6. OCLC 798058872.
- Stilwell, Victoria. (2016). The Secret Language of Dogs: Unlocking the Canine Mind for a Happier Pet. Berkeley. ISBN 978-1-60774-952-3. OCLC 933567582.
- Stilwell, Victoria (2019). The Ultimate Guide to Raising a Puppy: How to Train and Care for Your New Dog (First ed.). California. ISBN 978-0-399-58245-5. OCLC 1081390723.
