= Red Rover (disambiguation) =

Red Rover is a children's game.

Red Rover or Red Rovers may also mean:

== Arts and entertainment ==
- The Red Rover, an 1827 novel by James Fenimore Cooper
- Red Rover (film), a 2018 Canadian science fiction romantic comedy film
- "Red Rover", a track from the album Sleeper by the alternate rock band Tribe
- "Red Rover" (song), a track from the album Say You Will by the British/American rock band Fleetwood Mac
- Red Rover Studios, an animation studio owned by House of Cool Studios
- "Red Rover", a track from the album Yuq1 by Song Yuqi

== Ships ==
- USS Red Rover (1859), a steamer captured by the Union Navy during the American Civil War and used as a hospital ship
- Red Rover (clipper), two clipper ships, one launched in 1830, the other in 1852

== Sports teams ==
- Red Rovers, a former association football team - see History of association football in Brisbane, Queensland
- Red Rovers, the sports teams of Easton Area High School in Easton, Pennsylvania

== Other uses ==
- The Red Rovers or Alabama Red Rovers, a military unit that fought in the Texas Revolution
- RedRover (organisation), USA, animal rescue organization formerly known as United Animal Nations
- Red rover, the common name of the fish Emmelichthys ruber
- Red Rover, a robotic spacecraft developed by Astrobotic Technology

== See also ==
- "Red Rover, Red Rover", an episode of The Mentalist (season 4)
- Red and Rover, a comic strip by Brian Basset
