= Entrepreneur fair =

Type of trade fair

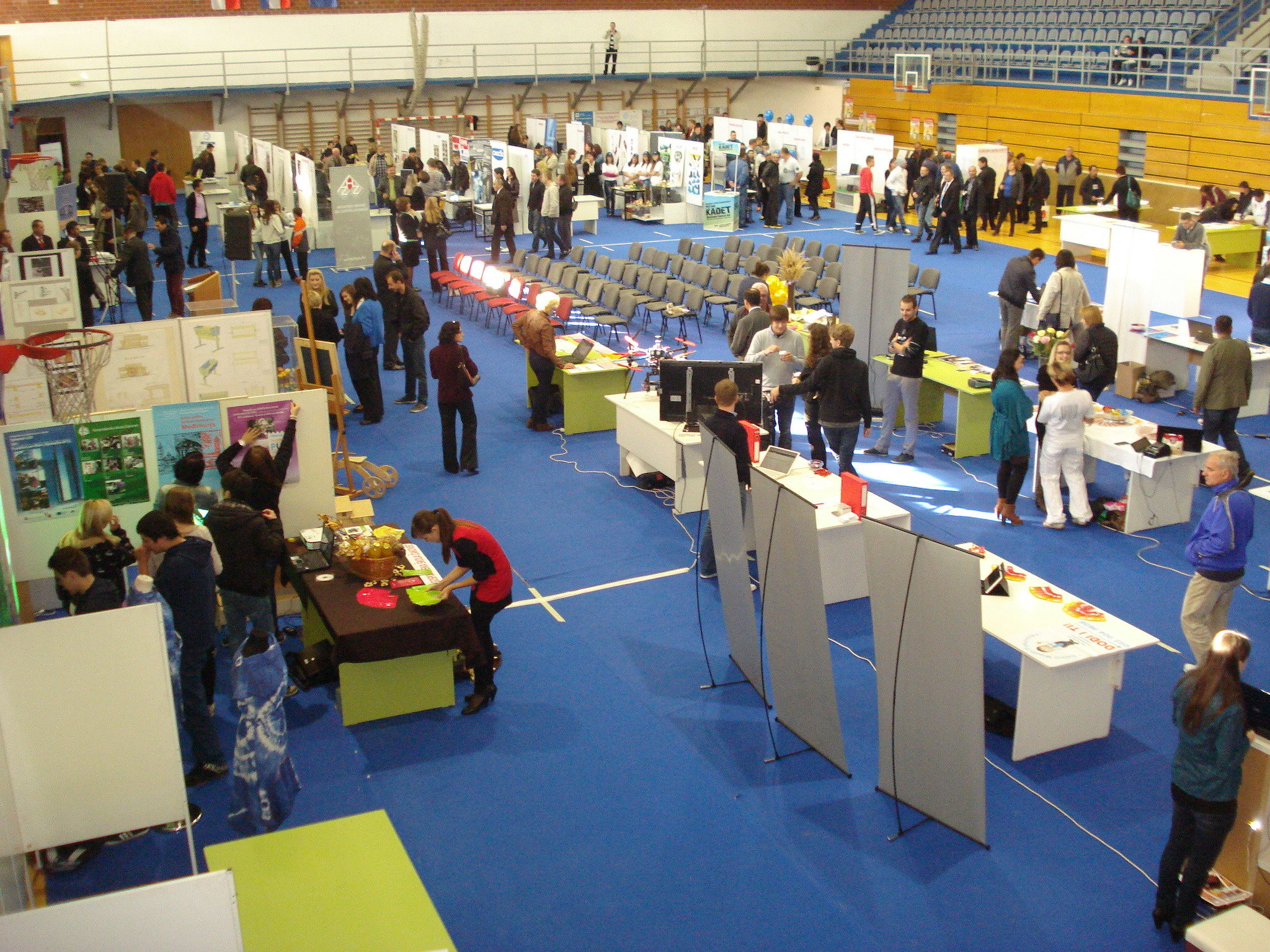
A youth entrepreneurship fair in Croatia (2013)

An entrepreneur fair or entrepreneurship fair is a trade fair that serves as an event or marketplace designed to promote businesses and innovative ideas, primarily focusing on individuals, micro-enterprises, and emerging companies, such as startups. These fairs can be categorized by their duration, temporary or permanent, and also by their location, which can be fixed or itinerant. Organizers may include public entities, such as local governments, which may integrate these events into their public policies through public-private partnerships. Additionally, private organizations, especially those that support small and medium-sized businesses (SMEs), may promote these fairs as part of their corporate social responsibility initiatives, fostering trade among individuals and enhancing local purchasing.

== Features ==
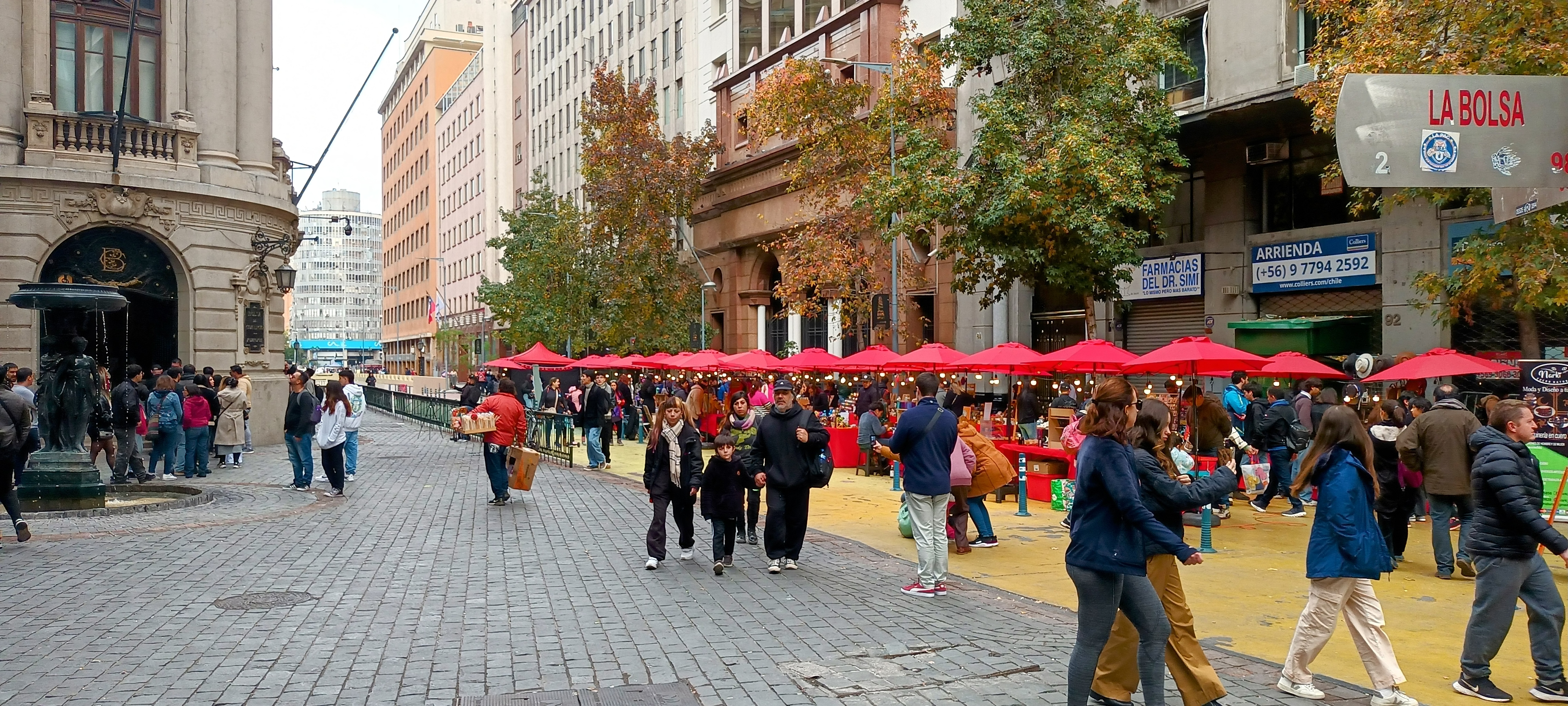
An entrepreneurs' craft fair outside the Santiago Stock Exchange, Chile

Events of this nature are characterized by their thematic organization, which facilitates the identification of a target market and promotes the creativity and additional value of the products showcased. Each event features a name that reflects its central theme. Furthermore, these fairs foster collaboration among small and medium-sized enterprises while enhancing public visibility. Examples include artisan craft fairs catering to artisans, designer-focused events, and fairs specifically supporting women entrepreneurs and female heads of households. In this line and as part of the celebrations of Women's Entrepreneurship Day, UN Women has been organizing a Women's Entrepreneurship Expo since 2022. Additionally, regional fairs are organized to showcase products from diverse areas, ethnic groups, and subcultures. Certain educational institutions host young entrepreneur fairs to foster collaboration among youth, enabling them to showcase their ideas and initiatives while sharing them with their peers.
