= Wendy Diamond =

American entrepreneur

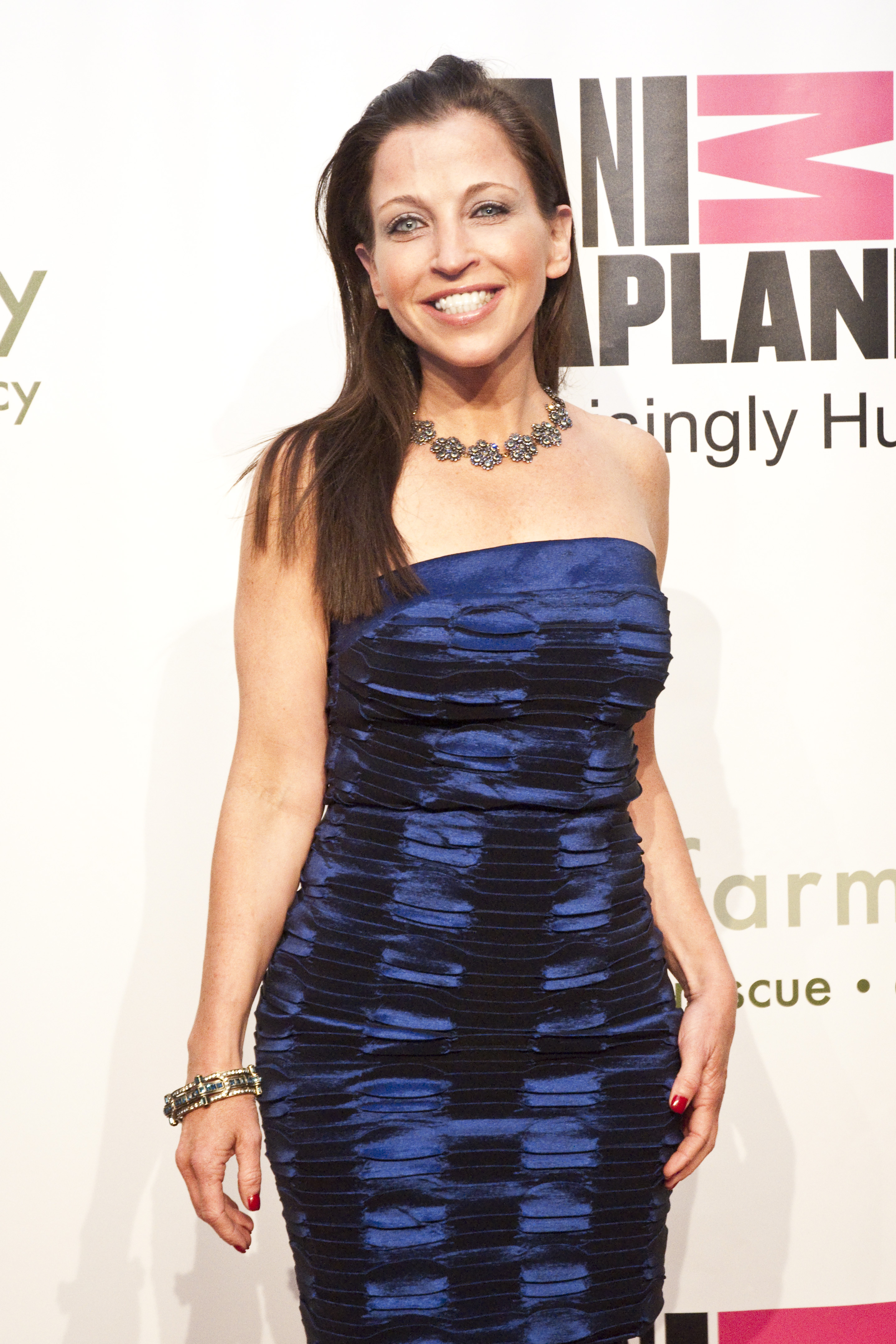
Image of Wendy Diamond

Wendy E. Diamond is an American philanthropist, entrepreneur, and television personality. She is the founder and CEO of LDP Ventures, an investment company focused on socially responsible ventures. Diamond is also the founder of the Women's Entrepreneurship Day Organization. Diamond is the creator of Animal Fair Media Inc., a media platform related to pets and pop culture.

== Early life and education ==
Diamond was born in Chagrin Falls, Ohio and in 1992, graduated from Pine Manor College in Chestnut Hill, Massachusetts with an associate's degree.

== Career ==
=== Charity cookbooks ===
Diamond self-published two cookbooks, A Musical Feast and An All-Star Feast. These cookbooks raised about $200,000 for various homeless charities, including the National Coalition for the Homeless, New York; Empty the Shelters; and the Coalition on Homelessness-San Francisco.

The recipes featured in the cookbooks are from musicians, including Madonna (a "cholesterol" cherry torte made with Dream Whip, margarine, and canned cherry-pie filling), Seal (penne with a broccoli and tomato sauce), Mick Jagger (shrimp curry), and Dolly Parton (a French custard and meringue dessert). The cookbook featured work from artists and photographers, and Nabisco agreed to underwrite the production costs. A Musical Feast was featured in People Magazine, and Diamond made appearances on Oprah and Howard Stern to promote the book as well as raise awareness for the issue of homelessness in America.

Diamond’s next book, The All Star Feast Cookbook, featured athletes and their favorite recipes, including Michael Jordan, Shaquille O'Neal, Pat Riley, Keyshawn Johnson, Caitlyn Jenner, Joe Frazier, Rebecca Lobo, Emmitt Smith, Troy Aikman, William Perry, David Cohen, Charlie Ward, Wayne Gretzky, Martin Brodeur, Mickey Mantle, Brook Robinson, Andre Agassi, Joe Montana, Martina Navratilova, Oscar De La Hoya, Nancy Lopez, Arnold Palmer, Mario and Michael Andretti, Adam Graves, Brian Boitana, Scott Hamilton, Carl Lewis, Michael Johnson, Alexi Lalas, Frank Gifford, John Harkes, and Joe Theismann. The All Star Feast Cookbook served as a fundraising tool for various charitable organizations, including the Special Olympics, Women's Sports Foundation, and the Buoniconti Fund to Cure Paralysis.

Her chance meeting with Marvin Girouard, the chairman of Pier 1 Imports, led to her cookbooks being sold in stores.

=== Animal Fair magazine ===
Diamond is the founder and CEO of Animal Fair Media, Inc., a pet lifestyle media platform that combines celebrity culture with animal rescue and welfare. Diamond established the company after adopting her dog, Lucky Diamond, a purebred rescue Maltese, and her cat, Pasha, a Russian Blue. She was moved to action after learning that 12 million animals were euthanized annually and aimed to promote animal adoption and rescue through popular culture.

Bloomberg has described Diamond as the "first to cross-breed two American passions: celebrity and pets." She is the founder and editor of Animal Fair Magazine, which highlights non-profit animal organizations, provides pet parenting and health tips, and showcases celebrities and their pets. It has featured celebrities including Beyoncé Knowles, Halle Berry, Paris Hilton, Jessica Biel, and Serena Williams,

Diamond and Animal Fair gained recognition for promoting rescue dog adoptions through media appearances. They have made appearances on major television networks such as NBC's Today Show, CBS, Good Morning America, and Fox News, as well as media outlets worldwide. During these appearances, they showcase dogs up for adoption and feature lifestyle pet segments to raise awareness about animal welfare issues and promote responsible pet parenting.

=== Television career ===
Diamond has appeared on television series including Single in the City on the WE: Women's Entertainment network, Lucky Travels on Animal Planet and Relationship Rehab on the Style Network. She frequently contributes to Today, Fox News Channel, CNN, Good Morning America and has appeared on The View, The Oprah Winfrey Show, Extra (TV series), MTV, VH1, and E!. She was dubbed by The New Yorker as the "Martha Stewart of the Milk and Bone dish",

In Summer 2008, Diamond was featured as one of the judges of the summer CBS series Greatest American Dog alongside Victoria Stilwell and American Kennel Club board member, Allan Reznick. Diamond served as a judge alongside Whoopi Goldberg and Betty White for the American Humane Association's Hero Dog Awards on The Hallmark Channel.

=== K9s For Warriors ===
Diamond supports K9s for Warriors, an organization that rescues sheltered dogs and trains them as service dogs for veterans with PTSD.

She donated the proceeds from her Bark Breakfast Benefit Tour and How To Train Your Boss To Rollover to the charity and enlisted supporters E's Alicia Quarles and Glee's Jane Lynch.

=== Other ventures ===
Diamond's production company Lucky Diamond Productions are Executive Producers and Creator of the pilot for NBC Mutt Makeover, Executive Producer and Host of Paws for Style Special on Fox. Lucky Diamond Production's latest project is In Search Of Puppy Love, a docucomedy that premiered at the Boston Film Festival and also played at the Cancun International Film Festival. The film is based on Wendy's Yappy Hour Rescue Tour that raised over $200,000 for animal rescue and featured celebrity appearances and interviews

Diamond was appointed to the World Entrepreneurs Day Advisory Board in March 2010 as Chief Pet Officer She later spoke at the World Entrepreneur's Day kickoff on April 14 at the UN. She later founded the Women's Entrepreneurship Day, held annually on November 19 since 2014.

Diamond and her dog, Lucky, served as the celebrity Grand Marshals for the 2010 Krewe of Barkus Mardi Gras parade on February 7, 2010 in New Orleans, Louisiana. Diamond also co-chaired and hosted the unveiling of the Katrina Pet Memorial for animals affected by Hurricane Katrina

On June 12, 2010 Diamond spoke at the H+ Summit (an event considering issues within transhumanism) hosted by the student organization Harvard College Future Society in conjunction with Humanity+. Her talk examined her projections for the future of pets and the pet industry. That year she also held the Yappy Hour Rescue Tour, which visited 15 different US cities to raise money for local animal rescue groups.

In November 2011, Lucky Diamond earned the Guinness World Record for most photographed dog with celebrities. At that date, Lucky had taken a total of 363 photos with celebrities. In 2012, Diamond's pet Baby Hope Diamond served as bride a charity event that set the Guinness World Record for most expensive pet wedding. The total cost was $270,000, donated from donors raising awareness for the Humane Society of New York. The donated amount was about $250,000 higher than the previous record holder. An additional $50,000 was raised for the society on top of the in-kind donations to the ceremony. Triumph, the Insult Comic Dog served as the ceremony's officiant, and the other dog in the ceremony was the winner of an online vote.

== Awards and honors ==
- GC4W Honored Wendy Diamond as a Global Champion For Women at the Library of Congress in Washington DC on International Women's Day in 2015.
- In 2016, Ellis Island Honors Society awarded Diamond the Ellis Island Medal of Honor in recognition of her humanitarian efforts.
- In 2019, she received the Women's Entrepreneurship Day Pioneer Award at the United Nations in recognition of her achievements in social entrepreneurship and global humanitarian work.
- Diamond, Wendy (1995). A Musical Feast. Diane Pub Co. ISBN 978-0-7881-6014-1.
- Diamond, Wendy (1997). An All-Star Feast. Global Liaisons Inc. ISBN 978-0-9647316-1-5.
- Diamond, Wendy; Perilli, Marilena (2006). How to Understand Men Through Their Dogs. Sterling Publishing Co., Inc. ISBN 978-1-4027-3096-2.
- Diamond, Wendy; Perilli, Marilena (2006). How to Understand Women Through Their Cats. Sterling Publishing Co., Inc. ISBN 978-1-4027-3095-5.
- Canfield, Jack; Hansen, Mark Victor; Newmark, Amy (2009). Chicken Soup for the Soul: What I Learned from the Cat. Chicken Soup for the Soul. ISBN 978-1-935096-37-5. (Foreword by Wendy Diamond)
- Canfield, Jack; Hansen, Mark Victor; Newmark, Amy (2009). Chicken Soup for the Soul: What I Learned from the Dog. ISBN 978-1-935096-38-2. (Foreword by Wendy Diamond)
- Diamond, Wendy (2010). It's a Dog's World. Random House. ISBN 978-0-345-51692-3.
