= Tillman (dog) =

Guinness World Record holder for fastest skateboarding dog

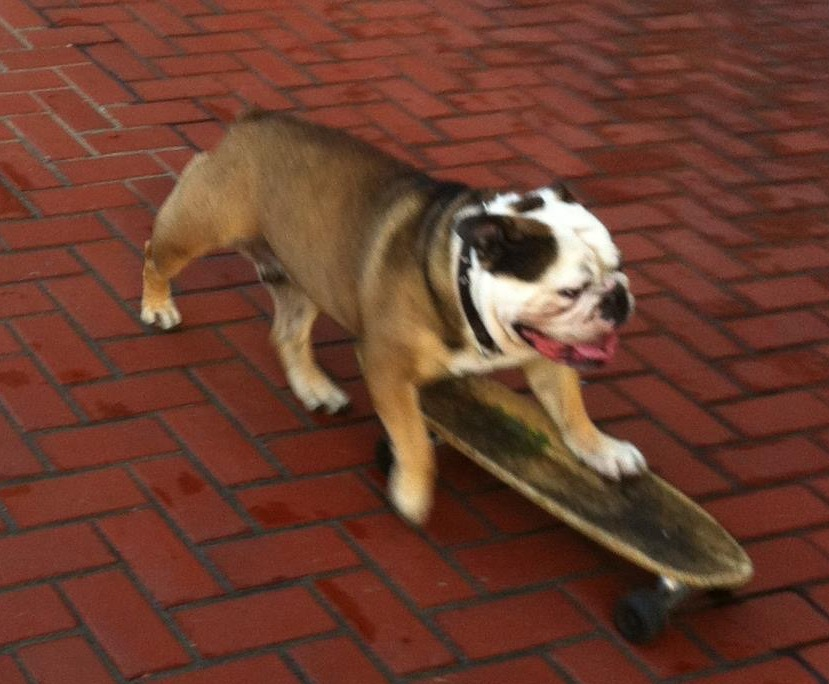
- Tillman riding a skateboard in San Francisco
- Other name: Pot Roast
- Species: Canis lupus familiaris
- Breed: English Bulldog
- Sex: Male
- Born: June 2, 2005
- Died: October 27, 2015
- Known for: Former fastest 100 m on a skateboard by a dog
- Title: Former fastest 100 m on a skateboard by a dog
- Term: 30 July 2009 – October 28, 2015
- Owner: Ron Davis
- Residence: Oxnard, California

Tillman was an English bulldog who held the Guinness World Record for "Fastest 100 m on a skateboard by a dog." He appeared upon Greatest American Dog and was nicknamed "Pot Roast".

Tillman rode on the Natural Balance Rose Parade float since 2009. He is one of the stars of Who Let the Dogs Out presented by Petco on the Hallmark Channel. He died on October 27, 2015.

== See also ==
- Tyson (dog) – another skateboarding bulldog

Records
Preceded by	Fastest 100 m on a skateboard by a dog 30 July 2009 – 16 September 2013	Succeeded by Jumpy
