= Dogs Today =

British magazine about dogs

Dogs Today magazine was launched in 1990 by Burlington Publishing Company Ltd, part of Associated Newspapers. It was the brainchild of Daily Mail newspaper proprietor the late Viscount Rothermere.

== History ==
Beverley Cuddy was appointed the launch editor. She had previously worked on many other dog titles and had been the Kennel Club's Information Officer, but this was her first editorship. She was also the publisher of the magazine.

Few at the Daily Mail shared Rothermere's vision and the launch was erratically supported internally. After some very expensive TV advertising the decision was taken to close the title and make all the staff redundant.

Cuddy believed in the title's potential and organised a management buyout. Lord Rothermere was amused and quite touched by this as Cuddy had no publishing experience. He sold the title to her for £1 and came in as a minor investor. He later confided that he thought she was highly unlikely to succeed where the might of Associated Newspaper's had failed. A year later, however, at the PPA awards, Dogs Today's new publisher Pet Subjects Limited took the Small Publisher of the Year Award. Rothermere was delighted and sent over his chauffeur with champagne to celebrate.

== Recognition ==
Dogs Today was short-listed for many other editing and publishing awards including the prestigious 'best dog magazine in the world award". The magazine was always a campaigning publication and it was key in the reform of the Dangerous Dogs Act and also the banning of tail docking - the magazine was cited by the Government committee that reviewed the subject.

The magazine is also active in campaigning for the improvement of the health of pedigree dogs and has compiled a comprehensive listing of all the hereditary health tests that should be performed for each breed before a litter is bred.

In 2020 Dogs Today was acquired by Brandshare Ltd.
