= Tyson (dog) =

Dog famous for skateboarding

Tyson (born October 2001) is a bulldog that is famous for his ability to skateboard. He has appeared on numerous TV shows, including The Oprah Winfrey Show and Rob & Big, and video sharing websites like YouTube.

Tyson's owner Jim Blauvelt says that the dog was self-taught, starting in Huntington Beach, California in 2001. He appeared in the two movies: Lords of Dogtown and Undiscovered in which his performance was considered to be "outstandingly gifted". Tyson earned more than $1000 a day for performing.

== See also ==
- Tillman (dog) – another skateboarding bulldog
