= Women's Entrepreneurship Day =

Observance in November

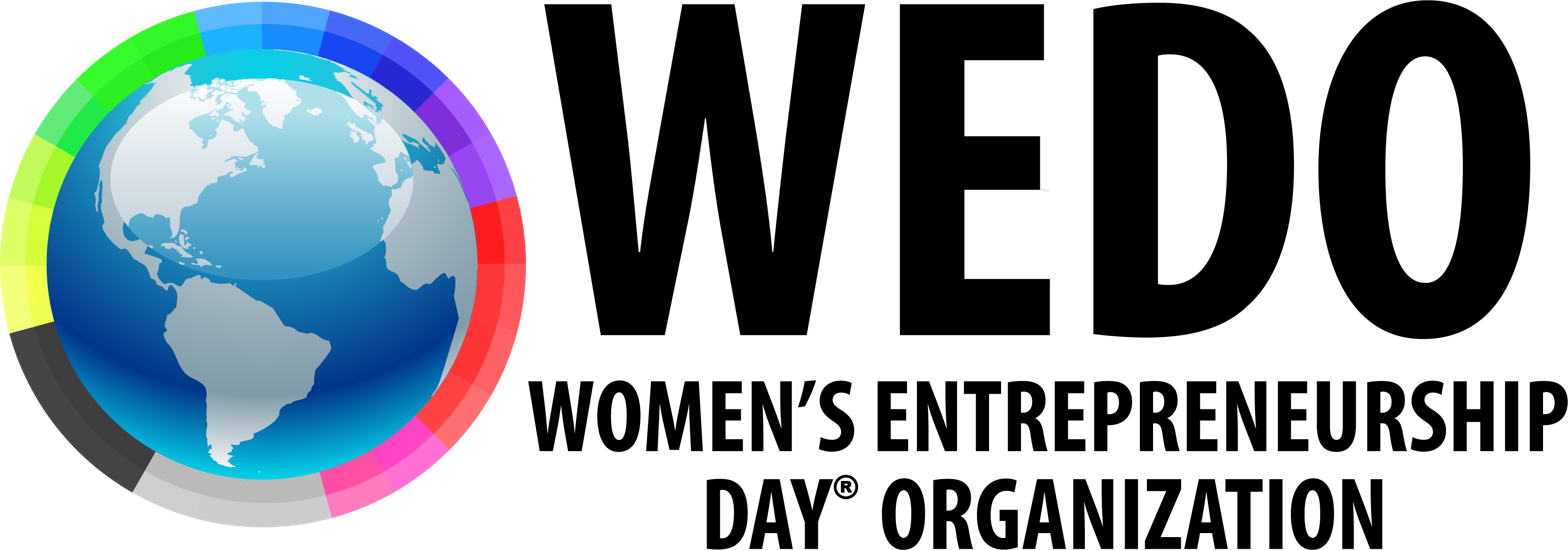
- Abbreviation: WEDO
- Founder: Wendy Diamond
- Type: Non-profit
- Location: International
- Website: Official website

Women's Entrepreneurship Day (WED) celebrated annually on November 15 is a day on which the work of women entrepreneurs is observed and discussed, held each year. The inaugural event was held in New York City at the United Nations, with additional events being held simultaneously in several other countries. 144 nations overall recognized the first WED in 2014, which included the presentation of the Women's Entrepreneurship Day Pioneer Awards.

== History ==
Women's Entrepreneurship Day was founded by Wendy Diamond, after volunteering with the Adelante Foundation who provides microcredit to low income women while in Honduras. Upon her return to the US she decided she wanted to develop something to help this and similar philanthropic causes. The first day was held on November 19, 2014, and was observed in 144 countries that year. It was described by Fortune as "a global movement to celebrate and support female founders and shed light on some of their challenges."

The date was moved to November 15 2024 to avoid clashing with International Men’s Day which is celebrated annually on November 19 since 1999. The day was celebrated at the UN headquarters on November 13 2026.
