= Greatest American Dog =

- Genre: Reality competition
- Presented by: Jarod Miller
- Judges: Victoria Stilwell; Allan Reznik; Wendy Diamond
- Country of origin: United States
- No. of seasons: 1
- No. of episodes: 10

Production
- Executive producer: R. J. Cutler

Original release
- Network: CBS
- Release: July 10 – September 10, 2008

Greatest American Dog is an American reality television series on CBS. It debuted on July 10, 2008 and was hosted by Jarod Miller with judges Victoria Stilwell, Allan Reznik, and Wendy Diamond. The winner was given the title of "Greatest American Dog" and a prize of $250,000.

== Episode format ==
Each episode had a theme, such as "teamwork" or "loyalty," that was tested through two different challenges.

The winner of the first challenge, the "Dog Bone Challenge," receives deluxe accommodations within the Canine Academy (similar to the "Head of Household" suite on CBS' Big Brother). In addition, for the first four weeks, the winner of the challenge got to send one of the other teams to the "Dog House," a much smaller building with few amenities. For the remaining weeks, the winner received a "leg up," some form of assistance that would help the contestant in the second challenge.

In that second challenge, the "Best in Show Challenge," the teams are evaluated by the judges. The judges then choose one or more winners (except for Week 1), and place three teams in the "bottom three." Of those three, the judges then choose the team they feel had the worst performance; that team is then "expelled" from Canine Academy.

== Episode progress ==
Owner & Dog	1	2	3	4	5	6	7	8	9	10
Dog Bone Challenge; Winner	JD & Galaxy	Travis & Presley	Travis & Presley, Brandy & Beacon	JD & Galaxy	Bill & Star^{1}	Teresa & Leroy^{1}	Bill & Star, Travis & Presley	Laurie & Andrew	Teresa & Leroy	No Challenge
Travis Brorsen & Presley	IN	IN	WIN	IN	LOW	IN	LOW	LOW	LOW	WINNER
Laurie Williams & Andrew	IN	IN	LOW	IN	WIN	LOW	IN	LOW	WIN	RUNNER-UP
JD Platt & Galaxy	IN	IN	WIN	WIN	IN	LOW	IN	WIN	LOW	EX^{2}
Teresa Hanula & Leroy	IN	IN	IN	LOW	IN	WIN	WIN	IN	EX	
Bill McFarlin & Star	IN	WIN	WIN	IN	IN	IN	LOW	EX		
Beth Joy Knutsen & Bella Starlet	LOW	LOW	WIN	IN	IN	IN	EX			
Laura Nativo & Preston	IN	IN	WIN	IN	LOW	EX				
Brandy Yant & Beacon	LOW	IN	IN	LOW	EX					
Ron Davis & Tillman	IN	IN	LOW	EX						
David Best & Elvis	IN	LOW	EX							
Elan Hagens & Kenji	IN	EX								
Michael Piper-Younie & Ezzie (a.k.a. Esmerelda)	EX									

1 - In episode 5, Teresa & Leroy won the Dog Bone Challenge, but gave it to Bill & Star. In episode 6, Bill & Star won, but returned the favor, giving it to Teresa & Leroy.
2 - In episode 10, JD & Galaxy were eliminated after a preliminary interview, and did not take part in the final obstacle course/interview.

(WINNER) The owner/dog won the series and was crowned Greatest American Dog.
(WIN) The owner/dog won that episode's Best In Show Challenge.
(LOW) The owner/dog was selected as one of the bottom entries in the Elimination Challenge, but was not expelled.
(EX) The owner/dog lost that week's Elimination Challenge and was expelled from the competition.
(IN) The owner/dog neither won nor lost that week's Elimination Challenge. They also were not nominated for expulsion.

== Ratings ==
#	Air Date	Rating	Share	18-49	Viewers	Viewers + SD	Weekly Rank
1	July 10, 2008	6.2	12	2.1/8 (#1)	8.22 (#1)	9.46 (#1)	#5
2	July 17, 2008	4.6	8	1.6/		7.00 (#2)	
3	July 24, 2008	4.6	9	1.5	5.1	6.9	

All ratings based on Nielsen unless specified

== Episode guide ==
The contestants of Greatest American Dog: (top, left to right) David Best and Elvis, Laurie Williams and Andrew, Brandy Yant and Beacon, Michael Piper-Younie and Ezzie, Beth Joy Knutsen and Bella Starlet, Laura Nativo and Preston; (bottom) Ron Davis and Tillman, J.D. Platt and Galaxy, Elan Hagens and Kenji, Travis Brorsen and Presley, Bill McFarlin and Star, and Teresa Hanula and Leroy.

=== Here's To Man and Woman's Best Friend! ===
Original Air Date: July 10, 2008

The twelve competing dogs and their owners arrive at Canine Academy and meet each other for the first time. The theme for this episode was 'The Basics'.

Dog Bone Challenge: Doggy Musical Chairs

Similar to the human version of musical chairs, the dogs and their owners had to walk around a line of pedestals (the "chairs") while music was playing. There was a white line circling the chairs that the owners were not allowed to cross. The dogs were permitted to walk wherever they chose. When the music stopped, the owner had to direct their dog to get up onto a chair and sit. There were fewer chairs than contestants, so the last dog standing was out of the challenge. JD & Galaxy won this challenge, and placed David & Elvis in the Dog House.

Best in Show Challenge: The Talent Show

A chance to demonstrate the dogs' basic skills, the contestants and their dogs had to perform a themed skit in groups of four. The judges evaluated individual performances and how well the owner interacted with their dog.

Team Aloha	Bark 'n Wag High	Disco Dogs
Teresa & Leroy	Beth Joy & Bella Starlet	Michael & Ezzie
JD & Galaxy	Brandy & Beacon	Elan & Kenji
Bill & Star	David & Elvis	Laurie & Andrew
Laura & Preston	Travis & Presley	Ron & Tillman

The bottom three were Brandy & Beacon, Beth Joy & Bella Starlet, and Michael & Ezzie. Beth Joy was told her performance was disappointing when she lost control over Bella Starlet. Brandy was chastised for physically manipulating Beacon when Beacon wouldn't listen to Brandy's commands. Michael was told that his own performance overshadowed and overwhelmed Ezzie, who was having difficulty focusing.

- Dog Bone Winners: JD & Galaxy
- Bottom three: Brandy & Beacon, Beth Joy & Bella Starlet, Michael & Ezzie
- Expelled: Michael & Ezzie

=== He's a Farter, Not a Fighter ===
Original Air Date: July 17, 2008

Things grow a little tense at Canine Academy when Elvis has a small fight with Tillman and bites his eye. Elvis' owner, David, seems very passive about his dog's actions. Star suffers an injury to her neck and ear, and she has to be brought into an emergency vet to be stitched up. The cause of the injury seems to be unknown, though the vet suggests it may have been a feral cat. Star recovers with a bit of rest and relaxation. The theme for this week's competitions was 'Obedience'.

Dog Bone Challenge: Doggy Boot Camp

The dogs and their owners formed a "drill line", and Jarod gave a command to be performed in a certain time limit. The owners and dogs that didn't successfully complete the command within the allotted amount of time were out. The commands required were 'come', 'sit', 'stay' as they walked a circle around the dog, 'shake' with the dog's right paw, 'back up', 'circle right', and finally, 'circle left' followed by 'circle right. Travis & Presley won this challenge, and put JD & Galaxy in the Dog House.

Best in Show Challenge: "Pet"-iquette

This challenge was set at a makeshift restaurant called 'Bone Appétit' inside the Best In Show Arena. The judging criteria for the challenge were how well the dog executes the commands, dog manners, and grooming and appearance. The competitors were divided into two groups for the challenge. The owners first had to walk their dogs past the judges in the 'heel' position to allow the judges to assess the dog's grooming. They would then take a seat at the table with the rest of their group. The wait staff then brought in trays of food to tempt the dogs, while their owners asked them to 'leave it'. The final task required the dogs to 'sit' and 'stay' as their owners circled around the table. This week also introduced one pair being announced as 'Best in Show' by performing exceptionally well. Bill & Star won Best in Show in the "Pet"-iquette challenge.

The bottom three were Elan & Kenji, Beth Joy & Bella Starlet, and David & Elvis. David was told that his particular use of hand signals was confusing and distracting. Elan was told that her communication with Kenji was confusing and stressful to Kenji. She was also told that she was bordering on being harsh with her dog. Beth Joy had put Bella Starlet in a dress that covered most of her body, which resulted in the judges being unable to evaluate her grooming.

- Dog Bone Winners: Travis & Presley
- Best in Show: Bill & Star
- Bottom three: Beth Joy & Bella Starlet, David & Elvis, Elan & Kenji
- Expelled: Elan & Kenji

=== The Fast and the Furriest ===
Original Air Date: July 24, 2008

Elvis proves that he can 'play nice' with both Andrew and Tillman. The theme for this episode's competitions was 'Teamwork'.

Dog Bone Challenge: Tangled Leash

The contestants and their dogs had to work in pairs that were randomly selected. They were faced with an obstacle course with five sections that had leashes tangled identically throughout them. The dogs were hooked up to the leashes at each section, and, with the help of the other owner, had to guide their two dogs through the course verbally. Touching the dogs was prohibited. The first team to finish would win the competition and the Dog Bone Suite. Travis & Presley and Brandy & Beacon won this challenge, and put Laurie & Andrew in the Dog House.

Best in Show Challenge: The Fast and the Furriest

The competitors were split into two teams of five and had to complete six tasks in a relay race. The tasks, in order, were a frisbee throw, a set of five hoops, pushing a cart, a multi-level teeter-totter follow by a maze, a set of tunnels, and a sled pull where one dog rode the sled and the other four pulled it. As the Dog Bone Challenge winners, Brandy and Travis were the captains of the two teams and picked their other four members. Below is a table describing which dog completed which task. Travis' team won the Best in Show challenge.

	Frisbee	Hoops	Cart Push	Maze	Tunnels	Sled Rider
Team Travis	Galaxy	Bella Starlet	Presley	Star	Preston	Presley
Team Brandy	Leroy	Andrew	Tillman	Elvis	Beacon	Andrew

The bottom three were David & Elvis, Ron & Tillman, and Laurie & Andrew. David had run Elvis over the teeter-totters on leash (all of the other dogs were off leash), and the judges agreed that Elvis may have performed better off-leash as well. The judges told Ron that they didn't see any teamwork between him and Tillman that week. Laurie was chastised for tearing a larger hole in the paper on the last hoop to give Andrew an easier time, as it was an unfair advantage.

- Dog Bone Winners: Travis & Presley, Brandy & Beacon
- Best in Show: Team Travis
- Bottom three: Ron & Tillman, Laurie & Andrew, David & Elvis
- Expelled: David & Elvis

=== Top Dog Model ===
Original Air Date: July 30, 2008

The friendship between Laura and Travis continues to blossom, and Brandy seems jealous of it. Many of the contestants begin to stress over the Best in Show challenge. The theme this week is 'Personality'.

Dog Bone Challenge: Take It or Leave It

The dogs and their owners competed at the same time in nine separate lanes. They were shown an item, and the owner had to predict whether their dog would take that item or leave it. If their dog didn't do what they had predicted, the pair was out. The owners were allowed to encourage the dog to go see the item, but not allowed to command them to pick it up. The items in succession were a piece of steak, a stick, and tofu. JD & Galaxy won this challenge, and put Travis & Presley in the Dog House.

Best in Show Challenge: Photo Shoot

The dogs were given a photo shoot with a professional photographer. Each contestant had to pick an envelope from a bowl. The envelope had a word inside of it, and the dog had to portray that personality trait in their photo shoot. The judges looked at how the owners worked with their dogs in order to convey the personality trait they chose. JD & Galaxy won Best in Show for this challenge. The judges praised JD's incorporation of both breeds in Galaxy (pointer and border collie) to achieve her photo. The picture will be placed in an upcoming issue of Dog Fancy magazine courtesy of Allan Reznik.

JD & Galaxy	Sneaky
Bill & Star	Stubborn
Beth Joy & Bella Starlet	Mischievous
Teresa & Leroy	Angry
Laurie & Andrew	Curious
Travis & Presley	Joyous
Brandy & Beacon	Loving
Laura & Preston	Regal
Ron & Tillman	Lazy

The bottom three were Ron & Tillman, Teresa & Leroy, and Brandy & Beacon. Victoria Stilwell felt that Teresa's use of "snarl bands" (an elastic band meant to keep the dog's lips raised) on Leroy to achieve the angry look was inhumane and potentially harmful. Brandy was told that she'd made a poor choice by having a white dog on a white background. Wendy Diamond told Ron that he "single-handedly [had] the worst photo of a bulldog [she had] ever seen". The judges agreed that the photo lacked any imagination.

- Dog Bone Winners: JD & Galaxy
- Best in Show: JD & Galaxy
- Bottom three: Ron & Tillman, Teresa & Leroy, Brandy & Beacon
- Expelled: Ron & Tillman

=== Dancing with the Dogs ===
Original Air Date: August 6, 2008

Brandy becomes stressed when Beacon seems to be ignoring her. Bill & Star continue to feel homesick, and Teresa picks up on it. This week's theme is 'Coordination'.

Dog Bone Challenge: Mud Dog

There were two balance beams, one for the larger dogs, and one for the smaller dogs. The beams stretched across a shallow pool of mud. The owners had to place their dogs at one end of the beam, and call them to the other side. The dog had to cross the beam without falling or jumping off. The dog that successfully crossed in the fastest time would be awarded the Dog Bone Suite. Starting this week, there would be no more sending a person to the Dog House; instead, the winner would receive a 'Leg Up' in the Best in Show competition. Leroy and Star were the only two dogs to cross the beam successfully. Teresa & Leroy won the Dog Bone Challenge, but Teresa opted to give her prizes to Bill, who was really missing his wife. (The Dog Bone Suite includes pictures of loved ones, and occasionally, letters from them.)

Best in Show Challenge: Dancing with the Dogs

The challenge required the owners to train their dogs to do a short dance routine with them, incorporating tricks (much like competitive musical canine freestyle or heelwork to music). There were different genres of music and dance to choose from, including hip hop, ragtime, rockabilly, country, Latin, ballet, Broadway, and disco. Bill & Star's "Leg Up" was the ability to work with Kashaya, a professional choreographer. Laurie & Andrew were awarded Best in Show.

Laurie & Andrew	Ragtime
JD & Galaxy	Hip Hop
Beth Joy & Bella Starlet	Broadway
Teresa & Leroy	Disco
Bill & Star	Rockabilly
Travis & Presley	Country
Brandy & Beacon	Ballet
Laura & Preston	Latin

The bottom three were Laura & Preston, Brandy & Beacon, and Travis & Presley. Travis was told that Presley could have been more enthusiastic about the routine. Brandy was told that putting socks on Beacon and poor training caused Beacon to shut down. Laura was told that Preston wasn't focused and that she had lost control of him.

- Dog Bone Winners: Bill & Star
- Best in Show: Laurie & Andrew
- Bottom three: Laura & Preston, Brandy & Beacon, Travis & Presley
- Expelled: Brandy & Beacon

=== Salvador Doggy ===
Original Air Date: August 13, 2008

Laura and Travis continue to bond. Laura and Beth Joy argue during a deliberation for the Best in Show competition when Laura mentions to the judges that she'd thought Beth Joy had pushed Bella Starlet too far with certain paint-applying techniques. Travis helps to defend Beth Joy when the judges ask her about it. The theme for this episode's competitions was 'Intelligence'.

Dog Bone Challenge: Doggy I.Q.

The task challenged the dogs' abilities to focus and problem solve. Tempting food was placed behind a three-walled structure, with a small slat in the middle so the dog could see what was behind it. The dog then had to figure out the fastest way to the food. There was a five-minute time limit, and the owners were only allowed to say "go find it" and "go get it". Bill & Star won this challenge, but Bill gave the Golden Bone to Teresa to repay her favor from the week before.

Best in Show Challenge: Salvador Doggy

The competitors were told to each create a painting that represents the bond between themselves and their dogs. The twist on the challenge was that all of the paint could only be applied to the canvas by the dog. (The paints were non-toxic and safe for their use.) The judges looked at the creativity of the painting, as well as technique and use of tools. Teresa & Leroy's 'Leg Up' was the ability to work with Kirstin McMillan, a dog art instructor. Teresa & Leroy won the Best in Show challenge.

The bottom three were Laura & Preston, JD & Galaxy, and Laurie & Andrew. The judges felt that the painting created by Laura & Preston looked very rushed and had little thought put into it. They felt that Laurie hadn't put enough effort into her work either. JD was chastised for seemingly trying to make mistakes in Galaxy's painting appear to be intentional.

- Dog Bone Winners: Teresa & Leroy
- Best in Show: Teresa & Leroy
- Bottom three: Laura & Preston, JD & Galaxy, Laurie & Andrew
- Expelled: Laura & Preston

=== The Big Dig ===
Original Air Date: August 20, 2008

Beth Joy is upset when Bella Starlet begins to act aggressive. JD and Laurie have a discussion about the difference between their training methods, foreshadowing a heated argument between judges Victoria Stilwell and Wendy Diamond on the same topic after the Best in Show challenge. There was no specific theme in this episode.

Dog Bone Challenge: The Big Dig

The competitors worked in three randomly selected teams of two. One owner was placed inside of a box, and the other owner would be directing the dogs to rescue the person inside. The first dog had to run up and ring a bell. Above the box was a section full of wood chips that the second dog would have to dig in to reach a rope and pull it, freeing the person inside the box. There was a time limit of five minutes. The team with the fastest time would win. Bill & Star and Travis & Presley won this challenge, and were each able to call a loved one.

Best in Show Challenge: The Maze

The dogs were placed at the beginning of a hedge maze and had to maneuver their way through it and join their owner on the other side of it. The twist to the challenge was that the dogs had to lead out three Golden Retriever puppies through the maze with them. Bill and Travis, due to their Leg Up, were able to find out about the twist the day before the challenge and acclimate their dogs to six of the puppies. The other competitors had five minutes prior to the challenge to acclimate their dogs to the puppies. Importance was placed on how the owner encouraged their dog to interact with the puppies and get them out of the maze. There was a time limit of five minutes. The Best in Show winners were Teresa & Leroy, who got all three puppies out of the maze on their first run through it.

The bottom three were Bill & Star, Beth Joy & Bella Starlet, and Travis & Presley. Travis was told that his "hyperenergy" made it hard for Presley to respond to him and the challenge. Beth Joy was chastised for reducing her commands to "desperate bribes" as she got more anxious with Bella Starlet's performance. Bill was told that he had pushed Star far too close to her limit.

- Dog Bone Winners: Bill & Star, Travis & Presley
- Best in Show: Teresa & Leroy
- Bottom three: Bill & Star, Beth Joy & Bella Starlet, Travis & Presley
- Expelled: Beth Joy & Bella Starlet

=== My Dog Can Fly! ===
Original Air Date: August 27, 2008

Things start to get serious with only the top five remaining. JD notices Galaxy is limping after one of the challenges. This week's theme was 'Courage'.

Dog Bone Challenge: Elephant Charge

The dogs had to stand their ground as a nine thousand pound African elephant walked toward them at a steady pace. The dogs were not allowed to leave the inside of a circle drawn on the pavement. At twenty feet away, the elephant would stop and shake her head in an attempt to distract the dog. If the dog hadn't moved yet, the elephant would be brought closer, and would pick up a banana on the ground in front of the dog. The dog that allows the elephant to get the closest to them would win the challenge. Presley and Andrew both didn't leave the circle, and did a tie-breaker that involved both dogs inside the circle and the elephant "charging" at them instead of walking. Laurie & Andrew won the challenge.

Best in Show Challenge: Stunt Dog

Both the dogs and their owners were required to do a series of stunts including an incline ramp, a balance beam, and a zip-line. There were easier options for both the ramp and the balance beam. The competitors were able to practice on smaller versions of the equipment. Laurie & Andrew's 'Leg Up' was the ability to work with Tom Roche, a film and TV stunt dog trainer, and to work privately. The others had to take turns at the different practice stations. The judges looked at execution of the stunt, degree of difficulty, and fearlessness. JD & Galaxy won the Best in Show challenge.

The bottom three are Laurie & Andrew, Bill & Star, and Travis & Presley. Travis is told he was a little bit out of control while praising Presley on the very high apparatus the competition took place on. Both Bill and Laurie chose to take their dogs up the easier ramp and neither Star nor Andrew would jump down via the zipline when encouraged to do so. The judges chose to expel Bill & Star because they felt Star could have done the more difficult ramp.

- Dog Bone Winners: Laurie & Andrew
- Best in Show: JD & Galaxy
- Bottom three: Laurie & Andrew, Bill & Star, Travis & Presley
- Expelled: Bill & Star

=== Dog Swap ===
Original Air Date: September 3, 2008

JD has Galaxy checked out by a vet to ensure she is still able to compete. The vet tells JD that there is no reason to remove her from activity. This week's theme was 'Loyalty'.

Dog Bone Challenge: Tree Stump Stay

Each owner would stand on a tree stump, fifteen feet away from their dog, sitting on another tree stump. They had to remain either sitting or standing on the stump. The team that held their position the longest would win the challenge. Travis & Presley and Teresa & Leroy lasted about eighteen minutes before Travis decided Presley looked too uncomfortable and called him off. Teresa & Leroy won this challenge, and got to have a video chat with her boyfriend.

Best in Show Challenge: Me or Them

The competitors were given an hour each with each other's dogs to bond with them, and were not told the specifics of the challenge. Teresa & Leroy's 'Leg Up' was to know the details of the challenge beforehand. The owner and their dog were stationed in the middle of a semicircle. Each of the other owners were given the chance to try to lure that person's dog out of the semicircle with treats, toys and vocal commands. The winners of Best in Show were Laurie & Andrew.

The bottom three were Teresa & Leroy, JD & Galaxy, and Travis & Presley. Victoria Stilwell felt that both Teresa and JD were threatening in their stances when asking their dogs to stay. Presley was the only dog to break his stay, but Travis was able to regain Presley's attention. The decision from the judges seemed difficult to make, but ended up expelling Teresa, feeling that she'd lost sight of the meaning behind the loyalty challenge.

- Dog Bone Winners: Teresa & Leroy
- Best in Show: Laurie & Andrew
- Bottom three: JD & Galaxy, Teresa & Leroy, Travis & Presley
- Expelled: Teresa & Leroy

=== The Greatest American Dog Is... ===
Original Air Date: September 10, 2008

The top three face off in the final episode of Greatest American Dog. There was no Dog Bone challenge this week. There were instead two Best in Show challenges where someone was eliminated.

Best in Show Challenge: Final Exam

Each of the judges asked questions to the contestants individually (ie, "What makes your dog the Greatest American Dog?", "What have you learned at Canine Academy?"). Afterwards, one of the judges would examine the dog close up. Wendy Diamond approached Andrew and wanted to test how well he socialized with another dog (her own Maltese, Lucky Diamond). She had Laurie leave the room. Andrew played a little bit with Lucky, but seemed more interested in finding out where Laurie was. Wendy Diamond also approached Galaxy and asked JD how often he bathed Galaxy. Presley was tested by Victoria Stilwell on his 'leave it' command, and though not always completely focused, performed well. The judges expelled JD & Galaxy as they felt their relationship was based more on control than co-operation.

- Expelled: JD & Galaxy

Best in Show Challenge: Obstacle Course/Interview

This was a two part challenge, the first part brought back elements from earlier challenges. The obstacle course consisted of a stair maze followed by two see-saws, a balance beam that wobbled back and forth, pedestals to jump across (the length of the jump was twice the dog's length), and then they had to retrieve their favorite toy from underneath the elephant from a previous episode. The interview was each owner's last words about why their dog should be the Greatest American Dog. Their audience included the judges and host, Jarod Miller, as well as their former housemates.

- Greatest American Dog: Presley, a boxer
