= It's Me or the Dog =

English television program

- Genre: Factual; Reality
- Directed by: Dan Peirson
- Starring: Victoria Stilwell
- Narrated by: Sean Chapman; Ralf Little
- Country of origin: United Kingdom
- Original language: English
- No. of series: 6 (UK); 4 (U.S.)
- No. of episodes: 68 (including 4 specials) (UK); 77 (U.S.)

Production
- Executive producer: Jo Ball
- Producers: Abi Clarke; Dan Peirson
- Running time: 30 mins (UK); 60 mins (U.S.)
- Production company: Ricochet Television

Original release
- Network: Channel 4
- Release: 31 August 2005 – 10 May 2008
- Network: Animal Planet (U.S.)
- Release: 11 October 2008 – 4 August 2012
- Network: Really
- Release: 10 November 2021 – present

Related
- Supernanny; My Cat from Hell; Dogs Behaving (Very) Badly

It's Me or the Dog is an English television program featuring dog trainer Victoria Stilwell who addresses canine behavioral problems (which are often shown putting a strain on interpersonal relationships), teaches responsible dog ownership and promotes dog training techniques based on positive reinforcement. There was also an American television version of the show which ran for four seasons. The show currently airs in about 50 countries worldwide.

== Beginnings ==
British-born Victoria Stilwell was an actor who had built her sideline interest in dog training into a full-time business when she saw the first episode of Supernanny and realised that what she was doing with dogs was similar to what Jo Frost was doing with children. She contacted the producers of Super Nanny, British reality show producers Ricochet Television, who responded immediately, and production began on It's Me or the Dog. Stilwell said her motivation was to "highlight positive training because there are so many dominance trainers out there messing it all up". Stilwell acknowledges that training a dog on television is not the same as training without the cameras and crew.

== Format ==
A similar concept to Supernanny (albeit dealing with dogs instead of children), most episodes begin with a brief interview with the dog owners on when they first met their dog(s) and how their ordeals began. Victoria observes the dog(s) and owners in their home and in a range of situations, including seeing firsthand how it disrupts relationships with other people. Once there is sufficient evidence of the bad behavior, she then spends two or more days teaching the owners how to create a better atmosphere for both dog and owner, and how to train specific behaviors. On occasion owners are taken to shelters or training centers to provide them with additional information. Victoria then leaves them to implement her training regimen on their own. After some time (usually several weeks), Victoria returns to evaluate how the dog and owner are progressing and, when necessary, dispenses more training advice. This format mirrors the format of Super Nanny.

US Season 3, filmed in New York, took a looser documentary format. Stilwell sometimes implements a technique as soon as she sees a behavior rather than waiting until after the confrontation.

== Series and success ==
There have been three US seasons and four UK series of It's Me or the Dog so far, the first running for six episodes from 31 August 2005, and earning record ratings for Channel 4. The second series aired from January – March 2006, running for twelve episodes. The third series transmitted from October to November 2006, and was eight episodes long, which included two-hour long specials wrapped at each end; It's Me or the Dog – The Event and It's Me or the Fat Dog. In 2007, a special one-hour show at the Crufts Competition was shown on 13 March, and a fourth series of six episodes aired in July and August.

In June 2021, it was announced on Victoria Stilwell's Facebook page and on the It's Me or the Dog YouTube channel, that a fifth series of It's Me or the Dog (UK) had been commissioned and they were looking for applicants. Victoria stated that they would be following all UK COVID-19 guidelines. The series premiered on the UK channel Really on 10 November 2021 at 9 pm and 9:30pm GMT. The series was also released for streaming on Discovery+ UK.

Victoria Stilwell has also written two accompanying books, published by HarperCollins and titled It's Me or the Dog: How to Have the Perfect Pet and Fat Dog Slim: How to Have a Healthy, Happy Pet. The first book has also been published in the US by Hyperion. Stilwell and her husband, Van Zeiler, have established a website titled Positively.com to raise awareness of the benefits of using humane training tools.

=== U.S. version ===
The show premiered on Animal Planet in the United States on 16 April 2007. In this version, the first season consists of various British families and their dogs (including the It's Me or the Fat Dog special) while the second season has American dog owners. Animal Planet's second season premiered in the fall of 2008.

In 2011, the show attempted a new direction with a New York theme which became US season three. US season 4, also filmed in New York, premiered on 2 June 2012. It included 10 episodes with one released each week. The show attempted a new direction where it focused more on the owners and their personality traits than on their pets. It included such episodes as 'The Castle Goes to the Dogs' with Matt Demar, a former rapper whose clubs later came under investigation for drug sales and his then-girlfriend Melissa Ballacchino, and another where a German Shepherd's owner taught his dog to bite trees.

The USA version in the UK aired on Pick instead of on Channel 4.

== Episodes (U.K. version) ==
=== Series 1 ===
No. overall	No. in series	Title	Location	Original release date
1	1	"The Humping Brothers: Jimi and Duke"	Batley, West Yorkshire	31 August 2005
In Batley, Jimi and Duke are destructive, disobedient and disrespectful, but they are not delinquent teenagers. They're pet Labradors and they're causing mayhem in the Brown household. Weighing seven stone each and with the ability to open doors, nowhere and nothing is out of bounds for the marauding mutts.
2	2	"The Spoilt Minagerie: Fudge, Penny, Cookie, Toby, Blue and Mouse"	Birmingham, Warwickshire	7 September 2005
Birmingham, home to Karen Holder and her six dogs, Fudge, Penny, Cookie, Tobey, Blue and Mouse. These little menaces bark and howl incessantly, however, Karen is completely devoted to them, often ignoring her husband and son completely.
3	3	"The Monster Pomeranian: Teddy Pom-Pom"	Abergavenny	14 September 2005
Over in Abergavenny, Wales, two dogs are causing mayhem. Teddy Pom-Pom, a Pomeranian, and Prince Louis, a once well-behaved Pekingese, bark, fight and hump constantly, driving the neighbors crazy. Owner Mandy Whiteman just doesn't seem to care, often ignoring husband Martin and her teenage children.
4	4	"The Food Thief Dalmatian: Pongo"	Grantham, Lincolnshire	21 September 2005
Hailing from Grantham, Pongo, a Dalmatian, is causing some serious problems for Brian and Jacqui Beck and their four children. Pongo steals everything, even beer, and will do anything to keep himself as top dog, even if it means biting or attacking his owners.
5	5	"The Barking Queen Bichon Frise: Lilly"	TBA	28 September 2005
Bichon Frises are one of the most glamorous, expensive, and immaculately behaved dog breeds ever. Lilly is not one of them. The proud pooch of London resident Claudia Childs, this little madam barks and yaps 24/7, uses the house as a toilet, and shreds the mail every day. Her incorrigible behaviour is driving a wedge between Claudia, her husband Danny, and her two sons.
6	6	"The Demon Husky: Diesel"	Leeds, West Yorkshire	5 October 2005
Up in Leeds, a Siberian Husky is causing a rift between his owners. Diesel bites, jumps up at, and humps Becky every day, but not at her boyfriend Jordan. This dog's bad behaviour is tearing them apart, and their relationship is about to crumble.

=== Series 2 ===
No. overall	No. in series	Title	Original release date
7	1	"The Bully Bulldog: Pugsley"	10 January 2006
The great British bulldog is a symbol of national pride -- but not Pugsley. He's a serial humper, he's a bully, he fouls the family home, and he runs a mile at the mention of "walkies." This terror thinks he is top dog in the household and can do whatever he likes.
8	2	"The Dogs That Walk Their Owners: Toadie and Smartie"	17 January 2006
The Chubb family from Sussex, Mark, Jo and Ben, have some big canine problems on their hands. Weighing in at eight stone each, Great Dane/Labrador crossbreeds Toadie and Smartie are every bit as big as their bark. They're completely out of control and see all other dogs as the enemy, to the extent that Mark and Jo live in fear of walking them.
9	3	"The Miniature Dachshund With A Big Attitude: Rufus"	24 January 2006
When Holly Taylor chose a miniature dachshund for her 18th birthday present she got more than she bargained for. Ten months on, her cute sausage dog baby has turned into a snappy, spoilt, barking mad little monster. Rufus barks incessantly, snaps if people get too close, bullies the cat, wees and poos all over the house and goes mad at the sight of a pushchair. His antisocial antics are causing rifts between Holly, her mother Penny, and brother Ben.
10	4	"The Control Freak Yorkie: Bailey"	31 January 2006
Phil is the assistant governor of a high security Glasgow prison, but when he gets home, it's his 6-inch high, 4lb Yorkshire Terrier Bailey that lays down the law. If he’s not the centre of attention he attacks, forcing Phil and wife Jacqui to sit on separate sofas, and even sleep in separate beds, putting a severe strain on the couple's sex life. However, Jacqui and 18 year-old daughter Holly dote on him, even going so far as to feed Bailey from their own forks.
11	5	"The Dog With OCD: Max"	7 February 2006
Radio DJ "Diddy" David Hamilton's Gordon Setter Max is his pride and joy. But this dog is tearing apart David and wife Dreena with his eccentric behaviour. He'll only drink from the tap, pulls on the lead, slobbers constantly and costs a fortune in dry cleaning bills. But most alarming is his all-consuming obsession with reflections, bright lights and shiny objects.
12	6	"The World's Smallest Bodyguard: Rex"	14 February 2006
Patterdale Terrier Rex lives in the coastal town of Hythe with 14-year-old Rebecca Harris, her mum Victoria, and her mum's dog Duchess. Rex and Rebecca are best friends, but like an over-possessive boyfriend, Rex takes his role as protector too far. Victoria can't even enter Rebecca's bedroom without Rex barking and growling.
13	7	"The Dog From Hell: Tallulah"	21 February 2006
When 20-year-old ex-model and young mother Jade Towney spotted Chinese Crested Tallulah, she thought nothing of handing over £300 for the perfect pooch to pop in her handbag. However, this pedigree diva came with her own baggage. Tallulah is aggressive, attacking anyone who comes near her (especially old ladies), and defiles Jade's Bromley home with her disgusting toilet habits. Her behaviour is so bad, Jade's roommate/sister Chelsea is threatening to move out.
14	8	"The Monster German Shepherd: Ben"	28 February 2006
The Hart family from Stevenage are being split apart by the behaviour of their German Shepherd Ben. When Dad's at work, he's good as gold. But when Dad returns, he mutates into a snarling, biting aggressive monster. Ben's behaviour is so frightening, that daughters Carly and Clare can't even be in the same room as him.
15	9	"The Brawling Labradors: Red and Jasper"	7 March 2006
When Chris and Claire Foster were told they couldn't have children, they got Labradors Red and Jasper in order to keep their Staffordshire Bull Terrier mix Oscar company. But ever since a miracle happened and Claire gave birth to daughter Ellie, these lively Labs have become just too much to handle.
16	10	"Jilly Johnson's Great Dane Villain: Dylan"	14 March 2006
Great Danes Harley, Digby and Dylan are the pride and joy of former glamour model Jilly Johnson and her husband Ashley Broden, who live in the Home Counties. They have their own nanny, their own bedroom, their own 4x4, and gourmet meals cooked fresh. Things were grand with Digby and Harley, but since Dylan arrived, everything's gone downhill. Dylan barks at other dogs on the streets, pulls Jilly down on walks, and drives the other dogs astray with his ASBO antics.
17	11	"The Clumsiest Show Dog: Bailey"	21 March 2006
Jane and Brian Haywood dream of showing their Giant Schnauzer Bailey at Crufts. But despite his championship blood, this pedigree pooch is displaying anything but show dog behaviour. At home in Leamington Spa he humps, jumps up continuously and behaves like a hyperactive child. And his behaviour in the ring at the local dog shows is even more embarrassing: he barks non-stop, chews his lead, nips his owner and throws himself on the floor at the critical moment. What's even crazier is that he's the grandson of a Crufts champion!
18	12	"Teddy Pom-pom Update"	28 March 2006
Six months ago, the Whiteman family in Abergavenny were being held hostage by two tiny-but-furious fur balls. Teddy Pom-Pom the Pomeranian was the undisputed head of the household. Now Victoria is back to see if Teddy is still a reformed character.

=== Series 3 ===
No. overall	No. in series	Title	Original release date
19	1	"Jodie Marsh's Chihuahua Brat Pack"	10 October 2006
Jodie Marsh admits she would choose her dogs over a boyfriend without hesitation, but being potty about pets has landed her with a pack of unruly hounds whose horrible habits are threatening to drive the whole family crazy. Well-behaved Bulldog Paddy and his puppy sister Lyla are being bullied mercilessly by four, fouling, fighting, pint-sized Chihuahuas: Baby, Bean, Teddy, and Tommy.
20	2	"The Psycho Spaniels: Bramble and Benjy"	17 October 2006
Cocker Spaniels Bramble and Benjy are causing chaos in the Marshall home. They steal food, they fight, and, scarily, they bite. The main victims are the Marshall's four children, who get bitten nearly all the time. Note: After Victoria left, Benjy was put down after attacking daughter Rachel, making this one of the only dogs that Victoria failed to fix.
21	3	"The Dog Burglar: Lucy"	24 October 2006
In Leeds, Rowan wants to move in with boyfriend George, but George's misbehaving mongrel Lucy is scuppering his plans. Lucy steals from the fridge when they're out, drools over food, attacks the postman, and has no sense of privacy, following her owners everywhere.
22	4	"The Terrible Two: Pixie and Tyson"	31 October 2006
Tabloid journalist Antonella and her stay-at-home husband Lee have three dogs. Lee's German Shepherd Darla is as good as gold, but Antonella's dogs, Pomeranian Pixie and Maltese Tyson, certainly are not. They bully Darla and other dogs, and bark 24/7. They bark so long and so loud, they've turned their Wandsworth home into a cacophony of noise. And all Antonella does is shout back at them, which is a serious hearing hazard for baby daughter Tia.
23	5	"The Hairy Hooligans: Bumble and Dougal"	7 November 2006
Margate mother and daughter Penny and Jade Curran have two big hairy hooligans on their hands. Old English Sheepdogs Bumble and Dougal go crazy on walks, barking at other dogs, even if they're in the car, and constantly jump up at any visitors. They frighten people so much with their jumping up, they've driven away Penny's 83-year-old mother Betty, who's terrified of the dogs.
24	6	"The Four-Legged Baby: Buster"	14 November 2006
Natalie and Dave have two dogs they share together. Sheltie Morgan is no problem at all, but mongrel Buster certainly is. He steals food from everywhere, even the oven, before throwing it up later, and pees everywhere, on beds, on sofas, even on Morgan's head! Despite this, Natalie spoils him and Morgan rotten, giving them hot milk and chocolate in the evening, and even letting them in bed with her and Dave, putting a severe strain on the couple's love life.
25	7	"Jimi and Duke Update"	28 November 2006
Two years ago, Victoria met Jimi and Duke, the two Labradors who couldn't stop humping, opening doors and destroying things. Their crazy antics were driving their owners mad. Are they still reformed characters today, or have they gone back to bonking?
26	8	"Bumble & Dougal Update"	5 December 2006

=== Series 4 ===
No. overall	No. in series	Title	Original release date
27	1	"The Dogs Stolen From Their Owners: Widget and Gizmo"	12 July 2007
On 2 May 2006, Debbie and Richard Matthews' Yorkshire Terriers Widget and Gizmo got stolen. They probably wouldn't have seen them again, but Debbie had a secret weapon: her dad, legendary TV personality Bruce Forsyth. Within days, Debbie was reunited with her dogs, but at a price. Now they're back, Widget and Gizmo are no longer the placid pooches they were. They bark at everything and everyone, especially those with dogs. Nobody can even walk past the house without the dogs going crazy, causing Debbie to keep the blinds shut all the time.
28	2	"The Punk Pup: Chaos"	19 July 2007
Bull Terrier Chaos is owned by Nottingham punks Ruby and Phil, and their 6-year-old daughter Molly, but he is the only anarchist in their house. His behaviour is so bad it's sending his owners to bed at 7pm every night. Chaos humps everyone until their legs are black and blue, clumsily charges around the house constantly, scaring daughter Molly and on walks, will stop at nothing to get his leg over.
29	3	"The Savage Sisters: Roxy and Rio"	26 July 2007
Greyhound sisters Roxy and Rio's behaviour is so bad that their owners are on the verge of splitting up. These scary siblings constantly fight, bite, go crazy on walks and have turned the house into one big toilet. Between the endless cleaning and breaking up scraps, owners Zoe and Paul Atkinson are left with no time for each other, and it's taking its toll on their relationship.
30	4	"The Cat Replacement: Niles"	2 August 2007
Birmingham carer Karen Fletcher loves felines, but after 22 years as a cat owner, she decided to get a dog. So she bought Niles the Chihuahua because he was roughly the same size as a cat - treated him like a cat - and has never known a moment's peace since. Niles growls and bites, pees in the house, and won't let Karen anywhere near him. Taking him out for a walk requires military planning to minimise the bloodshed from his bites.
31	5	"The Demon Doberman: Harvey"	9 August 2007
Bill and Jane Wallace and their teen daughters, Olivia and Emily, lived a life of solitude with their Shih Tzu Lady, until Jane decided to get a bigger dog. The dog she chose was Doberman pup Harvey. Bad move. Harvey is too strong for Jane to walk alone, hates Jane and other dogs, pees in the kitchen when he's left alone, and bullies Lady, treating her like a ragdoll. Despite this, Harvey is doted on by Bill, making Jane feel left out.
32	6	"The Aggressive American Bulldog: Jed"	16 August 2007
Jed is a three-year-old, 50lb American Bulldog whose aggressive behaviour is ruining his owners' lives. Niel is in the navy and is away 40 weeks a year, so he got Jed as a companion and guard dog for Kelly, but now Jed's taken over their Portsmouth home and is so jealous of Kelly that he won't allow Niel and her to get close when he's back home. Even worse, jealous Jed gets aggressive when visitors come in the house, and, in a controlled situation, has even been known to attack.
33	7	"The Filthy Chocolate Lab: Teo"	24 August 2007
Student housemates Jodie and Carl have been friends for more than 10 years, but their friendship is being tested by Jodie's chocolate Labrador Teo. Teo steals everything, food, drink, even the ashtray! He also uses the house as a toilet, and eats his creations, a real health hazard for Jodie and Carl, who have fallen ill before.
34	8	"The Bouncing Boxer: Zulu"	29 March 2008
A year ago, Buks Teenson and wife Mel lived on a massive South African ranch but recently swapped it for a tiny terrace house in Feltham. While Maltese crosses Mac and Stumpy adjusted well, Zulu, the 7 stone Boxer, didn't like downsizing, and quickly picked up some bad habits. He bounces up the fence, scaring the neighbors, licks everything to calm down, and gets overexcited when any visitor comes around. All previous attempts to calm this bouncy, energetic, slobbering maniac have failed, and Bux and Mel have even started discussing divorce, purely because of the dog!
35	9	"The Tornado Terrier: Lottie"	19 April 2008
Sarah and Jason Keith are a young family with two small children, and when soft-hearted mum Sarah heard about an abandoned Patterdale Terrier puppy called Lottie, she seemed like the perfect addition to the family. Six months on, it's Sarah and Jason who need rescuing from their spinning, jumping, garden-wrecking, tearaway terrier in their home in Hampshire.
36	10	"The Panty Thief: Peanut"	26 April 2008
The Kenny family from Merseyside, single mum Lorraine, daughter Rhiannon and son Declan lived happily together until breast cancer survivor Lorraine got Peanut, a Jack Russell. Peanut tries to attack any visitors, shreds the post, uses the house as her toilet, tries to destroy the vacuum cleaner, and has an unusual penchant for stealing her family's underpants. Despite this, Lorraine spoils Peanut rotten, and does everything with her.
37	11	"The Man Hating Terrier: Toby"	3 May 2008
The Miles family from Selsey have six children and five dogs. Four of the dogs are fine, Lakeland/Jack Russell cross Toby isn't. He chews everything from furniture to beds to walls to plugs, poos everywhere, steals food from everyone, and leads all the other dogs astray with his disobedient, violent behaviour.
38	12	"The Wannabe Wolves: Molly and Alfie"	10 May 2008
In Peterborough, Victoria takes on her toughest case yet. The Colangelo family have two big dogs with big problems. Molly, a Belgian Shepherd mix, and Alfie, a Northern Inuit Dog terrify the neighborhood, howl the house down, and destroy anything they can get their paws on. Also in the episode, Victoria travels to rural Norfolk to meet Sally Leach, a dog expert who lives with 32 immaculately behaved Siberian Huskies.

=== Series 5 ===
No. overall	No. in series	Title	Original release date
39	1	"Shelby: The Terrorising Tearaway"	10 November 2021
40	2	"Sanza: The Deafening Dachshund"	10 November 2021
41	3	"Teddy: Struggling With Separation"	17 November 2021
42	4	"Archie: The Lecherous Lurcher"	17 November 2021
43	5	"Vinnie and Arnie: Double Trouble"	24 November 2021
44	6	"Kofi: The Little Shih Tzu!"	24 November 2021
45	7	"Max: The 12 Stone Lapdog"	1 December 2021
46	8	"Alison: The Terrified Chihuahua"	1 December 2021
47	9	"Molly: The Pampered Pooch"	8 December 2021
48	10	"Haize: The Obsessive Compulsive Canine"	8 December 2021
49	11	"Phoenix: The Lockdown Terror"	16 March 2022
50	12	"George: The Scared Spaniel"	16 March 2022
51	13	"Ziggy: Tyrannical Toy Poodle"	23 March 2022
52	14	"Kylo and Ren: Terrified Duo"	23 March 2022
53	15	"Nervous Nellie: The Rescue Pup"	30 March 2022
54	16	"Staffie & Yogi: The Colossal Canines"	30 March 2022
55	17	"Savage: The Tiny Terror"	6 April 2022
56	18	"Marley: The Bullish Bull Terrier"	6 April 2022
57	19	"Luka: The Deaf Dalmatian"	13 April 2022
58	20	"Noah: The Wayward Westie"	13 April 2022

=== Series 6 ===
No. overall	No. in series	Title	Original release date
59	1	"Pierre: The Embarrassing Pup"	30 November 2022
60	2	"Tyson: The Boisterous Boxer"	30 November 2022
61	3	"Wilma & Joanna: Spoiled"	7 December 2022
62	4	"Duggee: The Big Friendly Giant"	7 December 2022
63	5	"Floyd: The Rowdy Ridgeback"	14 December 2022
64	6	"Otis: Barking Mad Dachshund"	14 December 2022
65	7	"Milo: The Clawing Cocker"	21 December 2022
66	8	"Tiggy: The Tiny Tearaway"	21 December 2022
67	9	"Shaq: The Needy Newborn"	28 December 2022
68	10	"Nelly: The Worried Whippet"	28 December 2022

=== Specials ===
Title	Original release date	UK viewers (millions)
"The Event"	22 March 2006	N/A
In this special episode of It's Me or The Dog, Victoria takes her dog training skills on the road and trains 500 dogs from across Britain in one massive training session! Can she teach them the four dog training essentials all at once and achieve the world's largest simultaneous sit? She'll also look at their ancestors, wolves, to understand where our family pets came from far in the past.
"It's Me or The Fat Dog"	21 November 2006	2.3
In this special episode, Victoria meets three incredibly overweight dogs, in a bid to help them lose weight. Hattie, the bulging Beagle, is a compulsive food thief, whose keen sense of smell and lack of exercise has brought her up to 27kg, when a normal female Beagle should weight around 12kg. Gismo the chunky Chihuahua's loving owner Carol loves to feed him chocolate and leftover Indian takeaway, bringing his weight up to 5kg when a normal Chihuahua should weigh around 1-3kg. Finally, there's Jess, the dumpy Dachshund whose doting owner Jennifer is killing her with kindness, feeding her all the time, bringing her weight to 19kg, when the average Dachshund weighs around 9-10kg, more than double the weight she should be.
"Crufts Special"	13 March 2007	N/A
"Fat Dogs Update"	12 April 2008	N/A

== Transmissions ==
It's Me or the Dog (U.K.) series overview
Series	Episodes	Originally released	
Series	Episodes	First released	Last released
1	6	31 August 2005	5 October 2005
2	12	10 January 2006	28 March 2006
3	8	10 October 2006	5 December 2006
4	12	16 August 2007	10 May 2008
5	20	10 November 2021	13 April 2022
6	10	30 November 2022	28 December 2022
Specials	4	22 March 2006	12 April 2008

=== U.S. version ===
It's Me or the Dog (U.S.) series overview
Series	Episodes	Originally released	
Series	Episodes	First released	Last released
1	20	11 October 2008	5 October 2009
2	26	1 August 2009	20 June 2010
3	21	8 January 2011	21 May 2011
4	10	2 June 2012	4 August 2012

== International broadcasts ==
It's Me or the Dog has aired on several networks around the world, including:

Country / Region	Network
Algeria	Discovery Channel
Andorra	Sogecable
Australia	Network Ten (UK version); BBC Prime; Seven Network (US version)
Belgium	Vitaya
Benin	Discovery
Brazil	Globosat
Burkina Faso	Discovery
Burundi	Discovery
Cameroon	Discovery
Central African Republic	Discovery
Chad	Discovery
Congo	Discovery
Czech Republic	Spektrum
Denmark	TV2 Denmark

Country / Region	Network
Djibouti	Discovery
Dubai	BBC Prime
Estonia	Kanal 2
Faroe Islands	TV2
Finland	Liv
France	Discovery Channel
Gabon	Discovery
Germany	sixx
Greece	Skai TV
Greenland	TV2
Guinea	Discovery
Hong Kong	unknown
Hungary	Spektrum TV
Ireland	Sky TV

Country / Region	Network
Italy	Discovery Channel
Ivory Coast	Discovery
Japan	Discovery Channel; Nippon TV
Lithuania	TV1
Madagascar	Discovery
Mali	Discovery
Mauritania	Discovery
Mauritius	Discovery
Morocco	Discovery
Namibia	unknown
Netherlands	RTL4, Discovery
New Zealand	Prime
Nigeria	Discovery
Norway	TV Norge

Country / Region	Network
Poland	TVN Style
Romania	Digi Life
Rwanda	Discovery
Senegal	Discovery
Singapore	unknown
Slovakia	Markíza Doma
South Africa	BBC Prime
South Korea	sky Petpark
Spain	Cuatro
Sweden	TV4 Sweden
Togo	Discovery
Tunisia	Discovery
Turkey	NMI GbR
Ukraine	unknown
Zaire	Discovery
Zimbabwe	BBC Prime
