= Animal behavior consultant =

Occupation to help understanding animal behaviour

An animal behavior consultant is a practitioner of applied behavior analysis or clinical animal behaviour, who helps resolve behavior problems in animals, usually companion animals. Animal behavior consultants are usually employed to identify the cause of a behavior problem, to develop an intervention plan to change the problem behavior, and to help the owners learn how to execute that plan. Animal behavior consultants are distinct from animal trainers, in that their primary goal is not to train an animal to have basic manners or to perform a task, such as agility competition for dogs, but to mitigate behaviors that are problems for the animal's owner. Animal behavior consultants may also be known as clinical animal behaviourists, pet behavior counsellors or pet psychologists.

== Overview ==
The issues that an animal behavior consultant will typically be called upon to address depend on the species of animal and its living situation. There are, however, some problems that are common to all species of companion animal. These include aggression towards other animals or humans, self-injury and stereotypies, phobias, isolation and separation-related stress behaviors, destructiveness, making excessive noise, and resource guarding. The kinds of behaviors that consultants are called in to address may not be ethologically abnormal for the animal; they may be inappropriate given the individual animal's living situation and either undesirable from the client's point of view, a cause of diminished welfare for the animal, or both.

Animal behavior consultants may hold group classes for some behavior problems, and may work on-site at laboratories, zoos, sanctuaries or animal shelters; many work in clients' homes.

A typical in-home animal behavior consultation usually includes the following stages:

1. Intake questionnaire or interview. After the initial contact, the animal behavior consultant collects a history of the animal's life so far, a description of the current living situation, a description of the problem behavior and the circumstances in which the behavior happens, and a history of what the clients have done to address the issue so far.
2. Initial consultation and observation. The consultant will visit the client and animal in its current environment, and observe the animal. If practically and ethically possible, the consultant will observe the animal engaging in the problem behavior and identify the antecedents and consequences of that behavior.
3. Intervention design. Certain certifying bodies require animal behavior consultants will design interventions that conform to the Least Invasive, Minimally Aversive (LIMA) model of behavior modification. However this approach is not empirically tested. Interventions that focus on identifying the functional reinforcer that is maintaining the behavior and developing an individualized intervention that maximizes benefits and minimizes harms is recommended.
4. Implementation. In most cases, the consultant will teach the client some basic animal training skills, such as how to use a marker, such as a clicker, and how to deliver appropriate reinforcement or punishment. They will also teach the client to recognize the environmental antecedents to the problem behavior—what occasions the behavior to happen—and basic observation of the animal's body language and recognition of stress signals. The client will then follow the consultant's plan, with follow-up sessions as necessary.

Most animal behavior consultants work face to face with the animal and human client; however, in some cases, the consultant will work remotely over video and email. Remote consultation is a particularly common modality in separation related problems cases.

== Relationship to veterinary medicine ==
Behavior consultants do not practice veterinary medicine, unless they are also veterinarians. Veterinarians may choose to refer animals with behavioral issues to behavior consultants, and some veterinarians maintain working relationships with specific behavior consultants for this purpose. Some general practice veterinarians also choose to see behavior cases themselves. While few veterinary schools have extensive behavioral programs, some general practice veterinarians may choose to further their own education in this area. Additionally, a veterinary behavior specialty exists. Veterinary behaviorists are veterinary specialists with extensive education and experience in working with behavior problems. Behavior consultants may refer cases to veterinary behaviorists, especially animals who may benefit from behavioral medication, as only veterinarians are legally able to prescribe medications for animals.

== Education ==
Animal behavior consultants need education in a variety of different areas to be successful. They need to know about the normal behaviors of their chosen species, to understand the etiology of abnormal behaviors and have the skills to develop effective interventions to change abnormal behaviors and instruct their clients in implementing these interventions.

This knowledge can come from a variety of sources: undergraduate and graduate studies in animal behavior or a related discipline such as psychology from accredited colleges; online courses through professional and technical schools; or in-person classes through humane societies and other animal education organizations. There is no single course of study that will fully equip an aspiring animal behavior consultant for the job.

As animal behavior consulting requires the practitioner to be highly skilled in the mechanics of training animals—for example, in the timing of markers and delivery of reinforcers—aspiring consultants often undertake practical training. This can be in the form of a mentorship under a more experienced animal trainer or behavior consultant, classes as part of advanced training for volunteers at animal shelters and humane societies, and/or workshops that form part of certificates and diplomas.

Animal behavior consultants also need to develop strong observational and interpersonal skills. Developing these skills to a high level requires that an animal behavior consultant has some in-person observation and assessment of how they work. Often, an aspiring animal behavior consultant will shadow a more experienced colleague, accompanying them to visits and working with them in developing behavioral intervention plans and providing written guidelines for clients.

== Certification ==
The term "certified animal behavior consultant" or "Certificated Clinical Animal Behaviourist" can be used to describe an individual who either has been awarded a certificate, or who holds a current professional certification in animal behavior consulting. The major difference between a certificate and certification is that certifications are awarded retrospectively, based on an independent assessment of an applicant's knowledge and skills, whereas certificates are awarded on completion of a program of study, and assess the student's knowledge of that program.

There are certifying organizations for animal behavior consultants in the United States, United Kingdom, and internationally. Certification is awarded by professional organizations to individuals who have completed their application process and paid their dues. Organizations have different standards, admission requirements, and assessment procedures. The majority of certifying organizations are species-specific; however, a small number, such as the International Association of Animal Behavior Consultants or the Association for the Study of Animal Behaviour, offer separate certifications for different species.

Most organizations require recertification annually or every 3-5 years. To recertify, an animal behavior consultant must provide evidence of continuing education, usually in the form of continuing education units (CEUs) and in some cases evidence that of an ongoing caseload.

== Certifying organizations ==
Organization	Locations covered	Species	Designation	Full title
American College of Veterinary Behaviorists (dacvb.org)	USA & Canada	Not species-specific	DACVB	Diplomate American College of Veterinary Behaviorists
Animal Behavior Society	United States	Not species-specific	(A)CAAB	(Associate) Certified Applied Animal Behaviorist
Association for the Study of Animal Behaviour	United Kingdom	species-specific	CCAB	Certified Clinical Animal Behaviourist
Certification Council of Professional Dog Trainers	International	Dog	CBCC-KA	Certified Behavior Consultant Canine-Knowledge Assessed
International Association of Animal Behavior Consultants	International	Dog	(A)CDBC	(Associate) Certified Dog Behavior Consultant
"	"	Cat	(A)CCBC	(Associate) Certified Cat Behavior Consultant
"	"	Horse	(A)CHBC	(Associate) Certified Horse Behavior Consultant
"	"	Parrot	(A)CPBC	(Associate) Certified Parrot Behavior Consultant
International Avian Trainers Certification Board	International	Bird	CPBT-KA	Certified Professional Bird Trainer-Knowledge Assessed
Pet Professional Accreditation Board	United States	Dog	PCBC-A	Professional Canine Behavior Consultant-Accredited
Association of Animal Behavior Professionals	International	Dog	CDBT	Certified Dog Behavior Technologist

There is no legal requirement for an animal behavior consultant to become certified, licensed, or otherwise recognized by any professional organizations in order to practice. In most of the world, no specific regulations apply to the profession of animal training or behavior consulting.

Certifications exist for dog, cat, parrot, and horse behavior consultants, but clients can hire behavior consultants to work with any species. It is generally recommended that potential clients hire a consultant with experience in their animal's species. Experience is necessary because applied behavior analysis requires knowledge of typical behaviors in the species, how to observe and interpret body language, and the best way to reinforce desired behaviors.
