= RedRover (organization) =

Non-profit organization in the USA

RedRover is an animal welfare nonprofit that focuses on bringing animals from crisis to care and strengthening the human-animal bond. It was founded (as 'United Animal Nations') in Sacramento, California in 1987. It is not affiliated with United Animal Nations (International) based in Switzerland.

== History ==
Through its volunteer-driven RedRover Responders program (formerly Emergency Animal Rescue Service (EARS)), RedRover temporarily shelters animals displaced during disasters across the United States and Canada. In 2005, 435 EARS volunteers cared for more than 2,100 animal victims of Hurricane Katrina and later, Hurricane Rita at six locations in three states. In June 2008, RedRover deployed to Cedar Rapids, Iowa, to care for nearly 900 animals displaced by historic flooding there. In 2015, RedRover Responders were involved in sheltering and nursing back to health of 166 dogs and cats in Adams County, Ohio. Volunteers from RedRover together with others from Rescue Rebuild converted rooms in an emergency support housing shelter in Longview, Washington, to make them “pet-friendly” to better meet the needs of survivors with pets, in 2016. In 2019, Red Rover volunteers deployed to El Dorado County for a 7-day rescue effort which saw 300 animals rescued.

RedRover's Relief Program helps pet owners and Good Samaritans obtain urgent veterinary care for animals in life-threatening situations.

== Programs ==
The RedRover Responders Program temporarily shelters and cares for animals displaced by natural disasters and other crises, such as criminal seizures and hoarding cases, in the United States and Canada.

The RedRover Relief Program (formerly LifeLine Grant Program) provides funding to pet owners and Good Samaritans to help them care for animals in life-threatening situations.

RedRover's Readers Program fosters compassion and empathy for animals and empowers people to make choices that improve animal lives.
