= Cat behaviorist =

Occupation to help understanding cat behaviour

Cat behaviorists are individuals who specialize in working in close environments with not only the cats, but their owners, and dealing with managing the behavior of the cat. A cat behaviorist can be certified or certificated after years of academic study and practical case experience. However, it is also possible for a behaviorist to work locally without completing extensive training.

== Education ==
In the US, an ‘Associate Certified Applied Animal Behaviorist’ holds a degree from a college or university. Animal behavior study is essential, with focus on biological or behavioral science. The degree includes a thesis conducted with intense research. The coursework requires several credits in ethology, animal behavior, comparative psychology, animal learning, conditioning and animal psychology (experimental psychology). Associate behaviorist requirements also need experience along with the education. The Animal Behavior Society requires two or more years of experience with applied animal behavior and interaction with particular species. At least three letters of recommendation are necessary to prove experience and education.

Whereas a ‘Certified Applied Animal Behaviorist’ holds a doctoral degree with focus on animal behavior, and possesses five years of experience, or holds a doctorate in veterinary medicine that requires two years of residency in animal behavior and three years of experience in applied animal behavior. The coursework and endorsements are identical to the Associate Certified Applied Animal Behaviorist. However, a Certified Animal Behaviorist will have to obtain the skills necessary for working closely with a species as a researcher, be an intern or research assistant, and show original creations or interpretations of animal behavior.

== Duties ==
It is a common goal for the cat behaviorist to sort out problem behaviors and to create a strong communication between owner and pet. A cat behaviorist will work with both the cat and owner to achieve understanding between the relationships. They also concentrate on the unique changes in behavior in the pet and normal behavior so they can identify any irregular activities. They can even work along with veterinarians to distinguish the right medications for the animal.

As part of their duties, it is common for a behaviorist to work in a close environment with the cat, inspecting every detail necessary. A cat behaviorist must use their training of animal behavior to study responses and issues to lessen anxiety or fears rooted in the environment or elsewhere. They may question the owner's habits, house structure and living spaces of the pet to pinpoint certain concerns. It may be possible that in order to stop any unwanted behaviors, the owner of the pet will have to change their behavior first.

Understanding each other is one of many steps to peace in a warring household, and a cat behaviorist exists to provide just that: a link of communication between cat and owner. They aid in preventing or stopping psychological, health, and physical problems in the cat, such as scratching, biting, fighting, obesity, urine marking and more. A behaviorist will also inform or educate the owners about development stages in the cat in order to create an understanding. Once the owner understands the physical and social needs of a cat, behavior issues and other problems will decline.

A cat behaviorist will encourage socialization between the guardian and the cat to aid the process and gain a beneficial relationship. Social learning is extremely important for a cat and a cat behaviorist recognizes this and will incorporate these factors into the daily life. They promote healthy learning and stimulation with play and interaction. A cat behaviorist will also describe what is normal behavior and what is not, so that the owner can continue making that distinction and continue to help the cat.

== Certification ==
An applied animal behaviorist or clinical animal behaviourist can specialize not just with cats, but with dogs, horses, and even parrots. Often a certified behaviorist will have undergone graduate training in courses such as zoology, biology and animal behavior in certain universities.

In the US, Certified Applied Animal Behaviorists (CAABs) are behaviorists with a doctoral degree and Associate Certified Applied Behaviorists (ACAABs) are those who studied with a master's degree. There are various different organizations and associations that provide certification. The American College of Veterinary Behaviorists (ACVB) has a list of requirements before an individual can become board-certified, including an internship, examinations, creating a scientific journal and more.

The Animal Behaviour & Training Council (ABTC), located in the United Kingdom, aims to regulate courses and organisations in which to become accredited as feline behaviourists.

== Employment ==
Once qualified, a cat behaviorist can find a place of work in different fields. The need for animal specialty care and service is expected to increase, so jobs are in high demand.

Specifically, many cat behaviorists have started their own line of work as independent cat trainers and behavior modifiers, including Jackson Galaxy and Sophia Yin. Jackson Galaxy has partnered up with Animal Planet and provides a show called My Cat from Hell, which identifies behavioral issues in cats. Sophia Yin created her own website to help individuals with problem cats. Mieshelle Nagelschneider is another example, author of the book, The Cat Whisperer (Random House Publishing).

Other cat behaviorists have developed interest in veterinary jobs, animal control, animal shelters, kennels, and other animal-related work. In the UK, feline behaviourists are also known as clinical animal behaviourists, and work in a variety of sectors.

== Salary ==
Since the employment opportunities for cat behaviorists differ, there is no set working salary. Those working for non-profit companies or researchers, such as zoos, typically earn less than those working for private companies. It also depends on the role of the job and where the behaviorist works. According to Michael Hutchins from the American Zoological Association, "Most animal behaviorists earn from $35,000 to $90,000 and more".

== See also ==
- Cat behavior
- Dog behaviourist
