= Airplane ear =

Airplane ear is a term used in the following contexts:

- Barotrauma § Aviation and spaceflight: Ear tissue trauma caused during airplane journeys
- Cat behavior § Ears: Cat ear posture
