= Mieshelle Nagelschneider =

American cat Behaviorist

Mieshelle Nagelschneider "The Cat Whisperer"
- Occupations: Animal behaviorist, author, pet product spokesperson
- Website: www.thecatbehaviorclinic.com www.catwhispererbook.com

Mieshelle Nagelschneider is an American cat behaviorist, author of the eponymously titled book The Cat Whisperer and founder of The Cat Behavior Clinic in Portland, Oregon.

Nagelschneider, dubbed "The Cat Whisperer", has catered to clients nationally and internationally, including actress Charlize Theron, 90's pin-ups the Barbi Twins and best-selling novelist Gwen Cooper.

== Education and training ==
Nagelschneider was raised in Redmond, Oregon, and was a matriculated student in a comparative animal cognition program at Harvard University. She also studied animal psychology through Oxford University and animal behavior and animal welfare through the University of Edinburgh. She also worked in the veterinary health field prior to becoming a cat behavior consultant. Nagelschneider is a member of the Animal Behavior Society, The International Association of Animal Behavior Consultants, and the Association of Animal Behavior Professionals.

Nagelschneider accompanied Dr. Jordan Schaul to Central America to participate in census studies on wild cats. Their field work was featured in Modern Cat.

== Publications ==
With co-author Cameron Powell, Nagelschneider published the scholarly-cited cat behavior book The Cat Whisperer with a foreword by New York Times bestselling author, Gwen Cooper. Cooper was also a client of Nagelschneider's consulting firm, the Cat Behavior Clinic. Advanced praise for The Cat Whisperer (Penguin Random House), includes endorsements by John Fulton the host Animal Planet's Must Love Cats, Jordan Schaul (contributing editor to National Geographic Society) and Bob Tart (author of Kitty Cornered).

Nagelschneider's cat behavior modification plan ("C.A.T.") is described in detail and her primary tool for addressing common domestic feline behavior problems.

Nagelschneider contributes regularly to "Cat Whispering 101" and Pet360 where she also serves on their Feline Advisory Board. She is also a contributor to several national and international publications.

== Press ==
=== Radio and television features ===
Nagelschneider has appeared on numerous radio and TV programs, including the Today Show, Australia's The Circle, Nat Geo Wild, Animal Planet and Martha Stewart Living Radio.

=== Print and digital press coverage ===
As an animal behavior specialist, Nagelschneider has commented or been referenced in The New York Times, New York Post, Toronto Star, The Boston Globe, USA Today, Real Simple, Salon, Cat Fancy, The Globe and Mail, The Animal Rescue Site, The New Republic, and others.

== Spokesperson ==
Nagelschneider is the official spokesperson for Arm & Hammer cat products and also served as the International Cat Behavior Expert for Whiskas cat food products.

== Charity work ==
Nagelschneider is a strong proponent of helping cat-advocacy organizations and has recently endorsed the Paw Project, an anti-declawing program based in Los Angeles along with the LA-based Stray Cat Alliance, a rescue organization focused on the recovery and care of stray and feral cats. She is also strongly committed to raising awareness for the plight of black cats, and helping those in need find loving homes despite the persistent stigma associated with them.

Together with Jackson Galaxy, Nagelschneider raises awareness for the plight of stray and feral cats around the world.
