= My Cat from Hell =

American reality television series

- Genre: Reality
- Starring: Jackson Galaxy
- Country of origin: United States
- Original language: English
- No. of seasons: 11
- No. of episodes: 100

Production
- Executive producers: Melinda Toporoff; Pat Dempsey; JD Roth; Todd A. Nelson; Adam Kaloustian; Chandrea Miller
- Running time: 42 minutes
- Production company: Eyeworks USA

Original release
- Network: Animal Planet
- Release: May 7, 2011 – July 11, 2020

My Cat from Hell is an American reality television series that airs on Animal Planet and premiered in May 2011. It stars Jackson Galaxy, a cat behaviorist by day and a musician by night, who visits the homes of cat owners in order to resolve conflicts or behavior issues between the owners and their cats or between the cats and other pets. Behavioral issues can include attacks by the cats on their owners.

As of July 11, 2020, 100 episodes of My Cat from Hell have aired.

== Philosophy ==
Jackson Galaxy believes that he can help any "problem cat"—provided that its human guardians follow the advice he provides—and that most behavioral problems result either from triggers in the cat's environment, medical issues with the animal, or mishandling of the cat by humans.

Jackson teaches that cats are territorial, needing spaces within homes to call their own and that they send signals when they no longer desire petting, a condition he refers to as "overstimulation." Cats do not like being cornered and lash out when overstimulated. Certain cats (whom he calls "tree-dwelling cats") behave better when they have access to above-ground perches, and he often instructs owners of such cats to install an above-the-floor walkway with no dead ends, in order to provide these cats with the psychological comfort of escape routes.

Jackson does not believe in cats being surgically de-clawed, believing that the animals suffer for it. On episode 5 of season 2, "Cat Fight!", he said that cats become hyper aware of the weapons they have left, going straight for back claws (if these have not been removed) and teeth, because that's what they have to fight with. Later on in life, they suffer a lot more arthritis. Instead of de-clawing, he encourages owners to provide scratching posts and other designated surfaces that allow the cat to practice its instinctive behavior of scratching and exercising safely, or to use soft claws or vinyl claws which cover the claws rather than having the claws removed.

He teaches that there are correct and incorrect ways to pick up a cat and that when cats are picked up incorrectly, they will often injure humans in an attempt to escape. Most cats need exercise to release excess energy in a positive way; toys and play with owners are outlets Jackson encourages. When this is not done, such cats find ways to release energy on their own, which are often undesirable to their owners and/or destructive to the home.

In multi-animal situations, Jackson creates barriers in homes to divide the space into areas which the animals can claim as places of their own. He slowly introduces the cat to the other animals in positive situations (such as feeding). Occasionally, Jackson suspects that certain behavioral problems which defy conventional explanation are due to an underlying health problem (such as arthritis), in which case he instructs the owners to take their cat to a veterinarian before continuing efforts at modifying the behavior.

== Series overview ==
Season	Episodes	Originally released	
Season	Episodes	First released	Last released
1	3	May 7, 2011	May 21, 2011
2	6	January 7, 2012	February 18, 2012
3	10	June 30, 2012	September 8, 2012
4	17	April 6, 2013	July 20, 2013
5	10	April 26, 2014	July 5, 2014
6	7	October 11, 2014	November 22, 2014
7	10	April 4, 2015	June 13, 2015
8	10	April 2, 2016	June 11, 2016
9	12	April 28, 2017	July 21, 2017
10	12	September 1, 2018	October 20, 2018
11	2	July 11, 2020	July 11, 2020

== Episodes ==
=== Season 1 (2011) ===
No. overall	No. in series	Title	Original release date	US viewers (millions)
1	1	"He Hates My Boyfriend"	May 7, 2011	N/A
A cat named Bear becomes aggressive towards everyone and everything in the household except for his guardian Hannah.
2	2	"Fifi's Ruining My Love Life"	May 14, 2011	N/A
David's cat Fifi threatens to drive a wedge between him and his wife Lindsey.
3	3	"Wildcat!"	May 21, 2011	N/A
Part 1: Brian and Carre believe their feral cat Minibar has no hope of being tamed. Part 2: Jenny and Garret's cat Duff has anxiety and insecurity problems.

=== Season 2 (2012) ===
No. overall	No. in series	Title	Original release date	US viewers (millions)
4	1	"Terrorizing My Clients"	January 7, 2012	N/A
Tara and Josh's wedding has been put on hold unless the former's cat, Larry, who has never been spayed, can calm down. Heather's career as an at-home Pilates instructor is threatened by the presence of Ruby, who lashes out at her when she tries to remove the cat from her treatment room.
5	2	"Mad Max"	January 14, 2012	N/A
Shonna and Lori's Bengal/Manx mix, City the Kitty, frequently jumps on Shonna and attacks the other household cat, Missy. 'Mad' Max has frequently escaped his guardian's balcony to bully the neighborhood cats, and his guardians, who are expecting a child, worry about how he will react to the baby.
6	3	"On the War Path"	January 21, 2012	N/A
Boyfriend and girlfriend Tim and Brooklyn deal with incompatible cats, Brooklyn's cat Kleo frequently attacks Tim's cats, Snarf and Meow-Meow. Similarly, war veteran Bobby and his girlfriend In-Hae deal with Bobby's cat Marco who reacts violently towards In-Hae's small dog named Yuki.
7	4	"Pissed Off!"	January 28, 2012	N/A
Stephanie and Rob's struggle with their cat Stella who is territorial in the face of their three other cats and two dogs. Meanwhile, Jessica's cat Mr. Fluff terrorizes her boyfriend Cameron.
8	5	"Cat Fight!"	February 4, 2012	N/A
A cat named Penny Lane hates her owner's roommate. Roxy and Max are two cats that begin to attack each other after they move into a new home.
9	6	"Spitting Mad"	February 18, 2012	N/A
Two warring Sphynxes, Mathilde and Black Rose are constantly keeping their owners, Steve and Dierdre up at night. Travis and Dorothy fear that their temperamental cat Polly may and could attack toddler son Rex.

=== Season 3 (2012) ===
No. overall	No. in series	Title	Original release date	US viewers (millions)
10	1	"Cat Fight!"	June 30, 2012	N/A
Jackson heads across the U.S. to help two NYC couples with their aggressive cats: Mufasa, a silver Bengal has been constantly jumping and attacking Susanne, while boyfriend Justin takes it lightly. An uber-cramped apartment for engaged couple Mike and Emilie have become wargrounds for Olive who constantly attacks Pepper daily, forcing the couple instead of enjoying what will be their life together, to sleep in separate rooms at any sign of a fight between the two cats.
11	2	"My Cat or My Family"	July 7, 2012	N/A
Xena has been on a tear with Jen's family and house for the last several months, going into random screaming and hissing fits which have also left Jen, dad Mike and five-year-old son Chris scratched up and the latter even scared to go in his room. Gigi has taken such an aversion to new kitten Suki so much that Brit journalists Julie and Nick fear that her aggression may lead to the latter getting killed.
12	3	"Kitty Dearest"	July 14, 2012	N/A
Best friends Travis and Diane are struggling to co-parent Oscar the Sphinx peacefully together, as he lashes out at Diane whenever she picks him up, urinates everywhere but his litter box and disturbs Travis in his at-home office by constantly yowling at night. Vet Tech Esther and musician hubby Vincent are at ends with rescue tabby Riley who repeatedly lashes out whenever hands are outstretched.
13	4	"Kitty Jail"	July 21, 2012	N/A
14	5	"Roscoe the Menace"	July 28, 2012	N/A
15	6	"Cat Escape!"	August 4, 2012	N/A
Michael and Khrys have an escape artist in their home in the form of an unneutered Russian Blue named Kitty, who also marks all over the house. Addie, an 8 year old Tabby, repeatedly swats and scratches whoever comes near her, specifically in her cat tree, be it either owners Don and Joy or anyone else entering the house - behavior that Joy directly blames on more canine-centric hubby Don, who roughhouses while playing with Addie, as with a dog.
16	7	"My Cat Eats Everything!"	August 18, 2012	N/A
17	8	"My Cat is a Bully"	August 25, 2012	N/A
Mother and daughter Melissa and Mariah are at odds with the latter's pet cat Miley who constantly attacks the prior's two chihuahuas, but the problem may not be so much in Miley but the humans themselves, specifically Melissa, who continues to use the cat's "aggression" as an excuse to treat the dogs as if they were human babies. Burmese Gracie had been adopted from and returned to the shelter twice before finally coming home with Kristen, but the welcoming has not been so sweet, as Kris' boyfriend Lei, his family, friends and guests and the legions of former cat-sitters who've quit over Gracie have been subject to her attacks.
18	9	"Big Boi Ruins Our Social Life"	September 1, 2012	N/A
College roommates Nicole and Shoshana got more than what they bargained for when they took in pregnant stray Cutie, as unneutered and only surviving kitten Big Boi had turned their social lives upside down. As they also prep for the upcoming birth of their first child, Lucas and girlfriend of seven years, Candice have come at loggerheads over the fate of Lucas' 23 year old tabby Pump, who Candace sees as an interference with her work as an at-home holistic therapist.
19	10	"Bitten"	September 8, 2012	N/A
Achilles is owned by Amy, but has become aggressive to both Amy and Mike, Amy's boyfriend who, is thinking of leaving over Achilles' behavior. Kevin and Megan are the proud parents of a one-year-old little girl, Quinn as well as two four-legged "children" in cats Bitten and Chompy, but it is Bitten’s vicious attacks on the once abused and now rescued Chompy that has both Megan and Kevin taking sides in trying to protect their daughter from getting in the middle of these "fights"

=== Season 4 (2013) ===
No. overall	No. in series	Title	Original release date	US viewers (millions)
20	1	"Deaf, Blind, and Biting"	April 6, 2013	0.93
21	2	"Roommates From Hell"	April 13, 2013	0.94
22	3	"Penny Hates Puck"	April 20, 2013	1.21
23	4	"Feral Scottish Fold"	April 27, 2013	0.99
24	5	"Macho Cat"	May 4, 2013	0.94
25	6	"Graveyard of Peed on Things"	May 11, 2013	0.85
26	7	"The White Tornado"	May 18, 2013	0.81
27	8	"Chubs"	June 1, 2013	0.78
28	9	"Bea Hates CeCe"	June 8, 2013	0.85
29	10	"Cat Horror Show"	June 15, 2013	0.70
30	11	"My Cat Ruined My Wedding"	June 22, 2013	0.99
Katy and Aimee plan to move in together, but are thwarted by Katy's cat Pink, whom Aimee fears will attack her own cat Twiggles. Jon's cat Zoey viciously attacks his wife Michelle to the point that the latter has called animal control.
31	12	"Max Hates My Family"	June 29, 2013	0.95
32	13	"Buddha Bullies Hector"	July 6, 2013	0.76
33	14	"Evil Kashmir"	July 13, 2013	0.71
34	15	"Devil Cat"	July 13, 2013	0.82
35	16	"Crazy Daisy"	July 20, 2013	0.67
36	17	"Where Are They Meow?"	July 20, 2013	0.59

=== Season 5 (2014) ===
No. overall	No. in series	Title	Original release date	US viewers (millions)
37	1	"Sky Diver's Nightmare"	April 26, 2014	N/A
38	2	"Bloody Thirsty"	May 3, 2014	N/A
39	3	"Surprise Attack Cat!"	May 10, 2014	N/A
40	4	"Stalking Miss Daisy"	May 17, 2014	N/A
41	5	"Einstein Hates Izzy"	May 31, 2014	N/A
42	6	"Puma on the Rampage"	June 7, 2014	N/A
43	7	"911, My Cat's Holding Me Hostage!"	June 14, 2014	N/A
44	8	"Mama Mia!"	June 21, 2014	N/A
45	9	"Multi-Million-Dollar Nightmare"	June 28, 2014	N/A
46	10	"Demon Cat"	July 5, 2014	N/A

=== Season 6 (2014) ===
No. overall	No. in series	Title	Original release date	US viewers (millions)
47	1	"Hungry Like the Wolf"	October 11, 2014	N/A
48	2	"Scared to Laugh"	October 18, 2014	N/A
49	3	"Godzilla Attacks!"	October 25, 2014	N/A
50	4	"Reese the Ripper"	November 1, 2014	N/A
51	5	"When the Fat Lady Sings"	November 8, 2014	N/A
52	6	"Appetite for Destruction"	November 15, 2014	N/A
53	7	"Chloe the Bully"	November 22, 2014	N/A

=== Season 7 (2015) ===
No. overall	No. in series	Title	Original release date	US viewers (millions)
54	1	"My Boyfriend vs. My Cat"	April 4, 2015	N/A
55	2	"Darkness Comes Knocking"	April 11, 2015	N/A
56	3	"Real Housecat of Orange County"	April 18, 2015	N/A
57	4	"Bad Cat Karma"	April 25, 2015	N/A
58	5	"Fat Elvis"	May 2, 2015	N/A
59	6	"Psychic Disconnect"	May 9, 2015	N/A
60	7	"Happily Never After"	May 16, 2015	N/A
61	8	"Loves Bites!"	May 30, 2015	N/A
62	9	"Woody the Killer Kitty"	June 6, 2015	N/A
63	10	"Paranormal Cat-tivity"	June 13, 2015	N/A

=== Season 8 (2016) ===
No. overall	No. in series	Title	Original release date	US viewers (millions)
64	1	"Crazy Cat Opens Doors"	April 2, 2016	N/A
65	2	"Katrina Storms In"	April 9, 2016	N/A
66	3	"Four Blind Cats"	April 16, 2016	N/A
67	4	"Scary Tails"	April 23, 2016	N/A
68	5	"Breaking Bald"	April 30, 2016	N/A
69	6	"Brooklyn Cat Fight"	May 7, 2016	N/A
70	7	"Gotham Feral Cats"	May 14, 2016	N/A
71	8	"Twinkle, Twinkle, Little Scar"	May 21, 2016	N/A
72	9	"Felines and Frenemies?"	June 4, 2016	N/A
73	10	"A Brave New Cat World"	June 11, 2016	N/A

=== Season 9 (2017) ===
No. overall	No. in series	Title	Original release date	US viewers (millions)
74	1	"Scout's Honor"	April 28, 2017	N/A
75	2	"Mayday! Mayday!"	May 5, 2017	N/A
76	3	"Nightmare on Cat Street"	May 12, 2017	N/A
77	4	"Feral Shop Cat"	May 19, 2017	N/A
78	5	"Kitten Impossible: Roadtrip Rescue"	June 2, 2017	N/A
79	6	"Mojito Cat"	June 9, 2017	N/A
80	7	"Jekyll and Hyde Cat"	June 16, 2017	N/A
81	8	"A Scratch from the Past"	June 23, 2017	N/A
82	9	"Bully Cat"	June 30, 2017	N/A
Erin and her husband are at their wit's end with Martini, who has survived feline parvo and whose dislike of children, especially their niece, make her guardians question whether or not they can start a human family. Tana constantly bullies her younger feline housemate Buddha. In the My Cat from Heaven segment, we meet a firehouse cat named Flame.
83	10	"Bad Max"	July 7, 2017	N/A
84	11	"Good Kitty Bad Kitty"	July 14, 2017	N/A
85	12	"Cats in Isolation"	July 21, 2017	N/A

=== Season 10 (2018) ===
No. overall	No. in series	Title	Original release date	US viewers (millions)
86	1	"Posey the Terror"	September 1, 2018	N/A
87	2	"Pee Battle"	September 1, 2018	N/A
88	3	"Ferocious Foster"	September 8, 2018	N/A
Former indoor-outdoor cat Henery pees everywhere ever since he's been confined to his guardian's apartment. A woman who fosters a lot of cats has trouble with an aggressive, hand-shy one named Johnny. In the My Cat from Heaven segment, Jackson meets Ziggy, who saved his owner from cardiac arrest.
89	4	"Fluffy's Last Stand"	September 8, 2018	N/A
Missy, who has never been spayed, constantly attacks her feline housemate Fluffy. In the My Cat from Heaven segment, a Sphynx named Raisin serves as a therapy cat at a vet clinic
90	5	"Lucifer the Cat"	September 15, 2018	N/A
A cat named Pickles, also known as Bad Kitty, frequently attacks the women in his household. Lucifer and his feline housemate Daniel eat-or try to eat- anything and are not scared of open flames.
91	6	"Meow Mate"	September 15, 2018	N/A
Miles has a problem with frequent peeing that separates him from his feline housemates. This episode has two My Cat from Heaven segments. in one, Vicki and her cat Tabasco have created a fostering space at her marketing firm, while in the other, a prison in South Carolina has worked together with a local shelter to create a program in which convicts take care of cats and dogs
92	7	"My Therapy Cat Needs Therapy"	September 22, 2018	N/A
Desert Storm and Iraq War veteran David has a therapy cat named Salem who constantly attacks the household's other four cats and is a compulsive overgroomer. In the "My Cat from Heaven" segment, an earless cat named Otitis helped his guardian through a depression and shows children its okay to be different via classroom visits and a children's book.
93	8	"Baby the Bully"	September 22, 2018	N/A
Baby has a strange habit of bullying and 'assaulting' the younger female cats in his household. Daisy bullies her littermate Cooper, who was diagnosed with kidney failure, and steals his food. In the My Cat from Heaven Segment, a sphynx named Artemis has contributed immensely to the vocalising and socialising of five year old Sarah.
94	9	"Guilt Stricken Guardian"	September 29, 2018	N/A
Mahzad overfeeds her diabetic cat Balaa out of guilt.
95	10	"My Pup from Hell"	October 7, 2018	N/A
Zac and Meredith's cat Sidney pees everywhere and has a hard time adjusting to the death of his dog friend Diamond, especially when the latter's replacement, Teddy, humps Sidney every chance he can. Stella's guardians are afraid their cat will fatally attack their daughter. In the My Cat from Heaven segment, a cat named Grace alerted her guardians to a carbon monoxide leak
96	11	"Sister Smackdown"	October 13, 2018	N/A
Frankie constantly attacks her shyer sister Charlee. Married couple Devon and Jacqueline have eight cats, one of whom, Baby Angel, is particularly problematic: she pees outside her litter box and has a hard time trusting anyone but Jacqueline.
97	12	"Philly's Forgotten Cats"	October 20, 2018	N/A
Learning about the uncontrollable rising of feral cats in the city of Philadelphia, Jackson with Hannah Shaw recruit volunteers to stop the rising population of feral cats by capture them to spay and neuters the cats, then later release them.

=== Season 11 (2020) ===
No. overall	No. in series	Title	Original release date	US viewers (millions)
98	1	"Cat S... Crazy!"	July 11, 2020	N/A
99	2	"Homes Divided"	July 11, 2020	N/A

== Reception ==
Neil Genzlinger of the New York Times wrote, "Mr. Galaxy—yes, it feels ridiculous writing that—looks like a Hells Angel, but his love and respect for cats seems genuine, and his advice appears actually to help the clients, most of whom are couples whose crazed pets are affecting their relationships." Brad Wete of Entertainment Weekly commented, "Galaxy offers useful tips, even if your animal's not nuts."

== See also ==
- Dogs Behaving (Very) Badly
- Housecat Housecall
- It's Me or the Dog
- Supernanny
