= Cat behavior =

Behavior of cats

Cat behavior encompasses the actions and reactions displayed by a cat in response to various stimuli and events. Cat behavior includes body language, elimination habits, aggression, play, communication, hunting, grooming, urine marking, and face rubbing. It varies among individuals, colonies, and breeds.

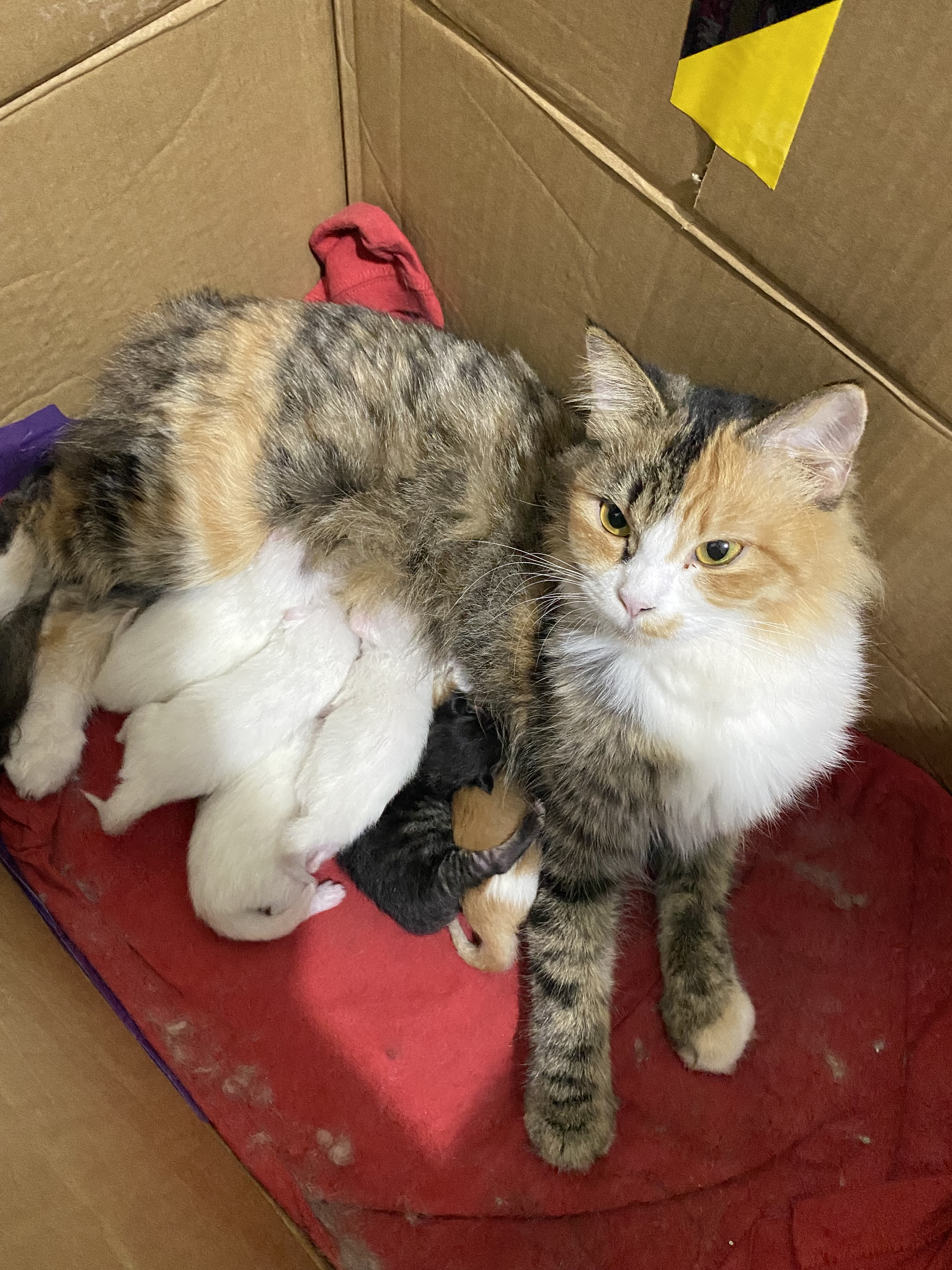
A mother cat who is breastfeeding her six kittens inside of a cardboard box

Communication and sociability can vary greatly among individual cats. In a family with many cats, the interactions can change depending on which individuals are present and how restricted the territory and resources are. One or more individuals may become aggressive: fighting may occur with the attack, resulting in scratches and deep bite wounds.

== Communication ==
Kittens vocalize early in development. Some examples of different vocalizations are described below.

- Purring – Commonly associated with relaxation and contentment in cats. Cats purr during activities such as: eating and resting, as well as when they are experiencing stress, pain, or illness.
- Meowing – It serves various communicative purposes in cats. It can function as a greeting, a request, a form of protest, or a general expression of attention-seeking behavior. Some cats have been observed vocalizing while moving through their environment, seemingly meowing to themselves.
- Hissing or spitting – This indicates an angry or defensive cat.
- Yowling or Howling – It is a prolonged loud meow sound that a cat would make to indicate that they are in distress. The distress could be multiple indications, such as being trapped, in pain, or simply looking for their owners.
- Chattering – This occurs when hunting or tracking potential prey. This consists of quick chirps made while the mouth vibrates. The gaze is fixed and staring. This behavior may be in response to a surge of adrenaline or may be caused by the anticipation of a pending hunt.

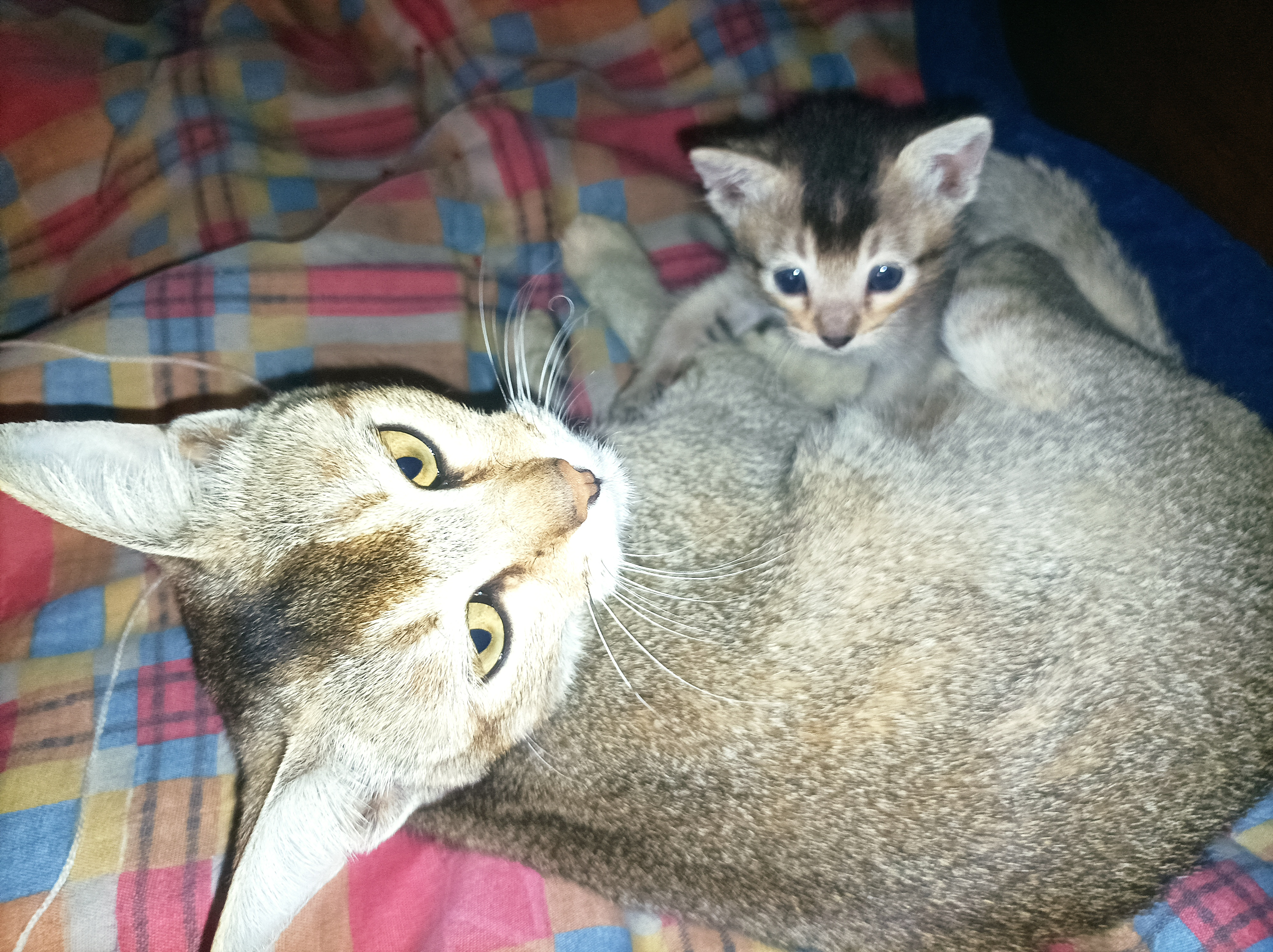
A mother of the Meitei domestic cat breed and her newly born kitten

=== Body language ===
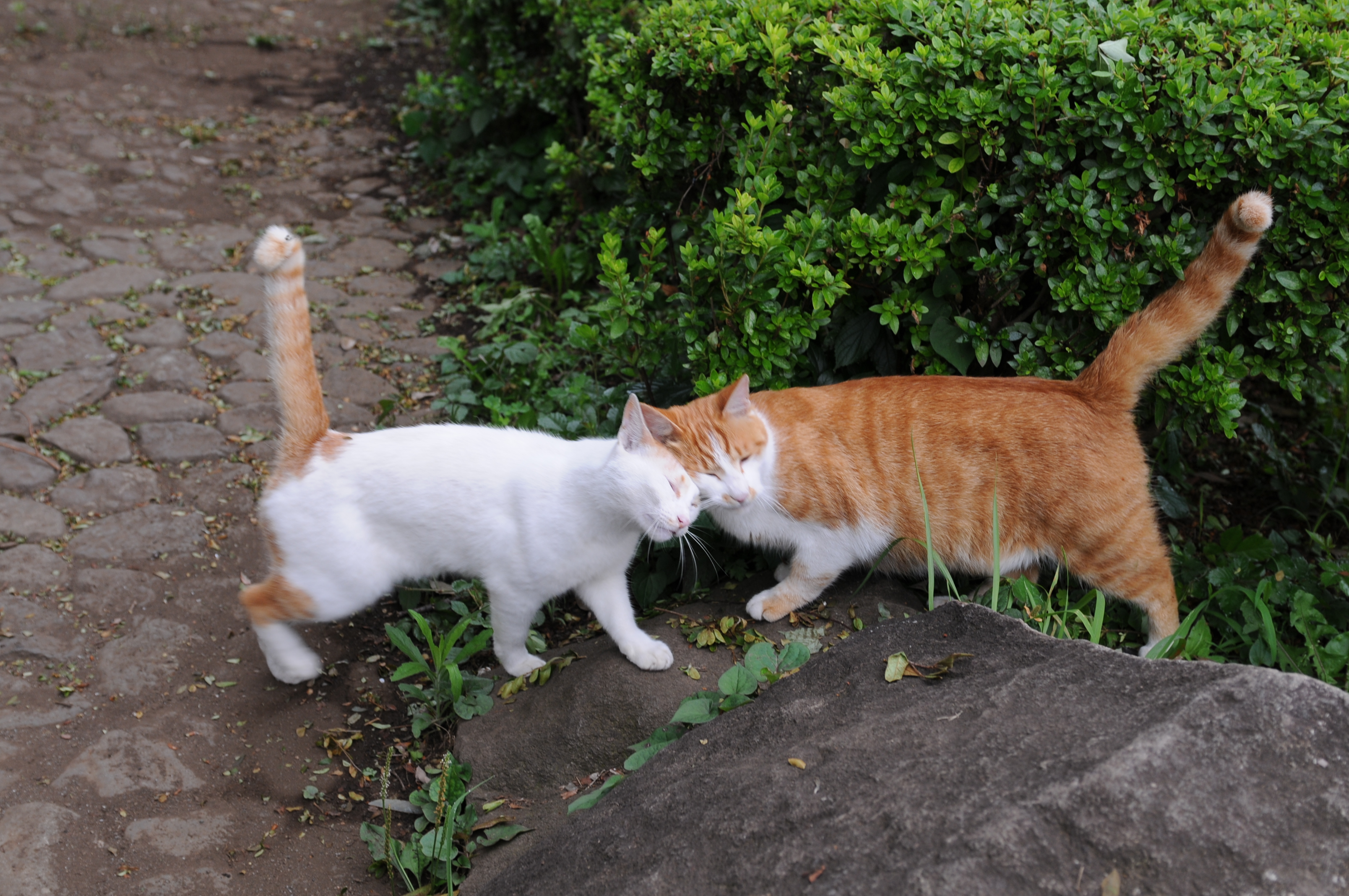
Cats greeting by rubbing against each other; the upright "question mark shape" tails indicate happiness or friendship

Cats rely strongly on body language to communicate. A cat may rub against an object or lick a person. Much of a cat's body language is through its tail, ears, head position, and back posture.

==== Tail ====
Observing how a cat holds its tail can give a good sense of the cat's current temperament.

- Held high, may have a slight curl forward – a sign of friendliness. The cat is happy, content, and comfortable. The tail may quiver or vibrate if the cat is excited.
- Held low and tucked under – a sign of fear or unease. The cat is attempting to make itself a smaller target to potential threats.
- Flicking, twitching – a sign of agitation. The cat is on high alert or is upset, and is not receptive to interaction. Cats may also flick their tails in an oscillating, snake-like motion, or abruptly from side to side, often just before pouncing on an object or animal.
- "Fluffed" or "Halloween-cat tail" – When a cat fluffs up their tail, they are not happy. Here, they are attempting to make themselves appear larger, warning whomever they feel unsafe with, to back off.

==== Eyes ====
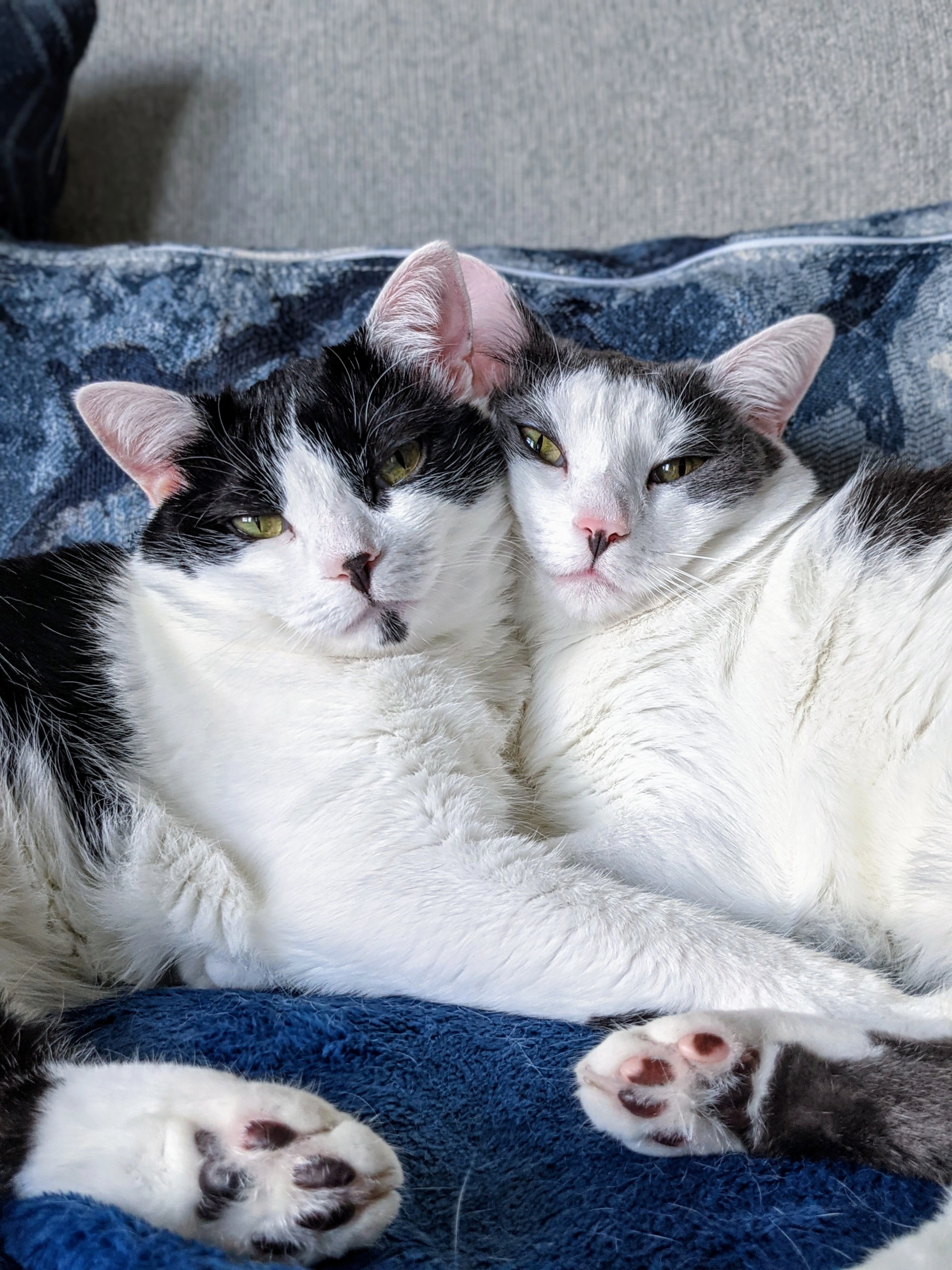
A bonded pair of sisters cuddling. Half-closed eyes show relaxation, trust, and affection

When cats greet another cat in their vicinity, they can do a slow, languid, long blink to communicate affection if they trust the person or animal they are in contact with. One way to communicate love and trust to a cat is to say its name, get its attention, look it in the eyes and then slowly blink at it to emulate trust and love. They may return the gesture.

In a study of 18 cats, the cat behavior of several half-blinks followed by a prolonged eye narrowing or eye closure was found to be a positive emotional response. They show a specific set of feline behaviors: several half-blinks followed by prolonged eye narrowing or eye closure. When a familiar human slow-blinks towards a cat, the cat tends to approach the human more frequently than if the human has a neutral expression that avoids eye contact. This behavior may share features with the "genuine" human smile that involves the corners of the eyes narrowing.

==== Ears ====
A cat's ears can tell an observer what they are feeling, such as pain, fear, or when they sense danger. At times, one may notice cats to display an ear posture commonly referred to as "airplane ears." This is when their ears are rotated to the sides or angled backward. Cats have acute hearing, so when something scares them, their ears tend to pin to the side or back, and the further they are, the more terrified the cat is. It can be difficult to understand what emotion the cat is portraying with their ears, especially since their ears undergo the same pattern when the cat feels they are in danger/feeling defensive, where their ears pin flat to their heads or turn back. "Airplane" ears do not last that long, only until the moment of danger or fear is over. When cats are in pain or feeling sick, they will hold their ears low, rotated to the side. Cats also show feelings of playfulness and happiness when their ears are pointing forward, straight up. This means the cat is alert and content.

==== Back posture ====
Cats make themselves "smaller" when nervous or afraid, but arch their backs when they wish to appear more intimidating when they sense danger and feel defensive. When they arch their backs, they also tend to "fluff" their tails, hence the "Halloween" cat look, known as piloerection. More information on posture is listed below.

=== Scent rubbing and spraying ===
These behaviors are thought to be a way of marking territory. Facial marking behavior is used to mark their territory as "safe". The cat rubs its cheeks on prominent objects in the preferred territory, depositing a chemical pheromone, known as a contentment pheromone. Synthetic versions of the feline facial pheromone are available commercially.

Cats have anal sacs or scent glands. Scent is deposited on the feces as it is eliminated. Unlike intact male cats, female and neutered male cats usually do not spray urine. Spraying is accomplished by backing up against a vertical surface and spraying a jet of urine on that surface. Unlike a dog's penis, a cat's penis points backward. Males neutered in adulthood may still spray after neutering. Urinating on horizontal surfaces in the home outside the litter box may indicate dissatisfaction with the box, due to a variety of factors such as substrate texture, cleanliness and privacy. It can also be a sign of urinary tract problems. Male cats on poor diets are susceptible to crystal formation in the urine, which can block the urethra and create a medical emergency.

=== Body postures ===
A cat's posture communicates its emotions. It is best to observe cats' natural behavior when they are by themselves, with humans, and with other animals. Their postures can be friendly or aggressive, depending on the situation. Some of the most basic and familiar cat postures include:

- Relaxed posture – The cat is seen lying on the side or sitting. Its breathing is slow to normal, with legs bent, or hind legs laid out or extended. The tail is loosely wrapped, extended, or held up. It also hangs down loosely when the cat is standing.
- Stretching posture – another posture indicating the cat is relaxed
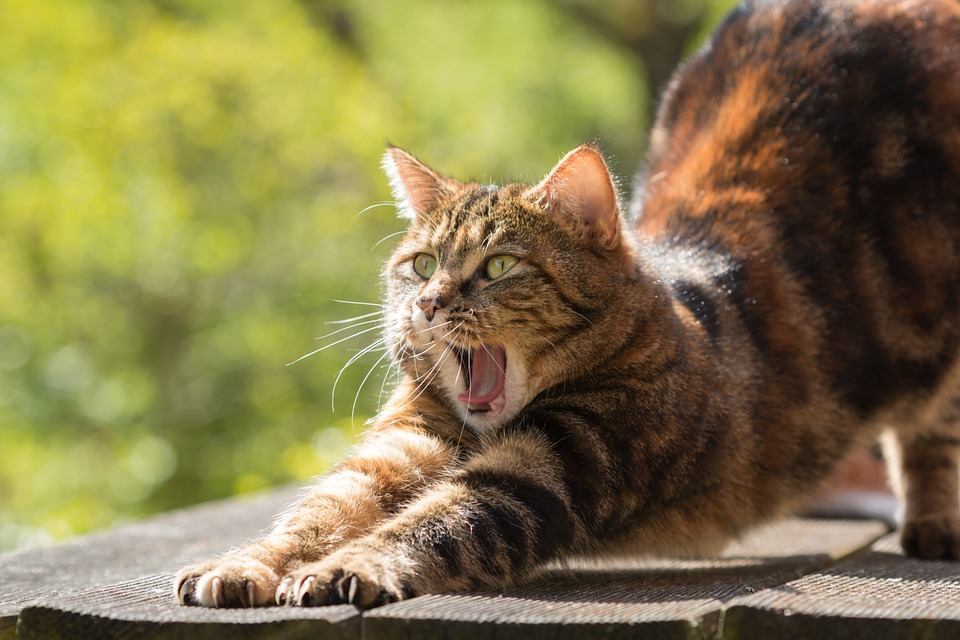
- Cat yawning posture
  Yawning posture – either by itself or in conjunction with a stretch: another posture of a relaxed cat.
- Alert posture – The cat is lying on its belly, or it may be sitting. Its back is almost horizontal when standing and moving. Its breathing is normal, with its legs bent or extended (when standing). Its tail is curved back or straight upward, and there may be twitching while the tail is positioned downward.
- Tense posture – The cat is lying on its belly, with the back of its body lower than its upper body (slinking) when standing or moving back. Its legs, including the hind legs, are bent, and its front legs are extended when standing. Its tail is close to the body, tensed or curled downward. There can be twitching when the cat is standing up.
- Anxious/ovulating posture – The cat is lying on its belly. The back of the body is visibly lower than the front part when the cat is standing or moving. Its breathing may be fast, and its legs are tucked under its body. The tail is close to the body and may be curled forward (or close to the body when standing), with the tip of the tail moving up and down or side to side.
- Fearful posture – The cat is lying on its belly or crouching directly on top of its paws. Its entire body may be shaking and very near the ground when standing up. Breathing is fast, with the cat's legs bent near the surface, and its tail is curled and very close to its body when standing on all fours.
- Confident posture – The cat may walk around in a more comfortable manner with its tail up to the sky, indicating its importance. Cats often walk through houses with their tail standing up high above them, making them look grander and more elegant.
- Terrified posture – The cat is crouched directly on top of its paws, with visible shaking seen in some parts of the body. Its tail is close to the body, and can be standing up, together with its hair on the back. The legs are very stiff or even bent to increase their size. Typically, cats avoid contact when they feel threatened, although they can resort to varying degrees of aggression when they feel cornered, or when escape is impossible.
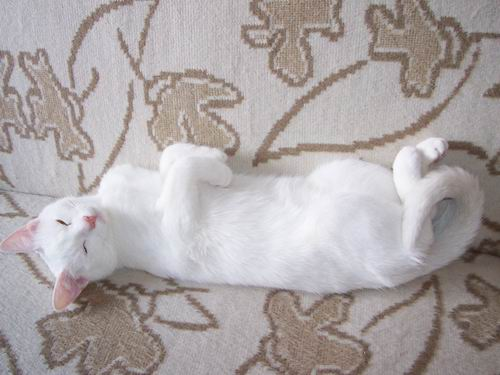
Relaxing cat

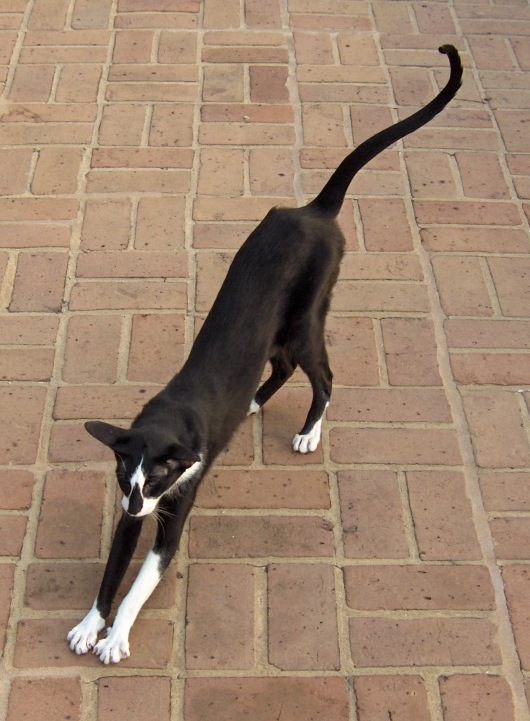
Stretching cat

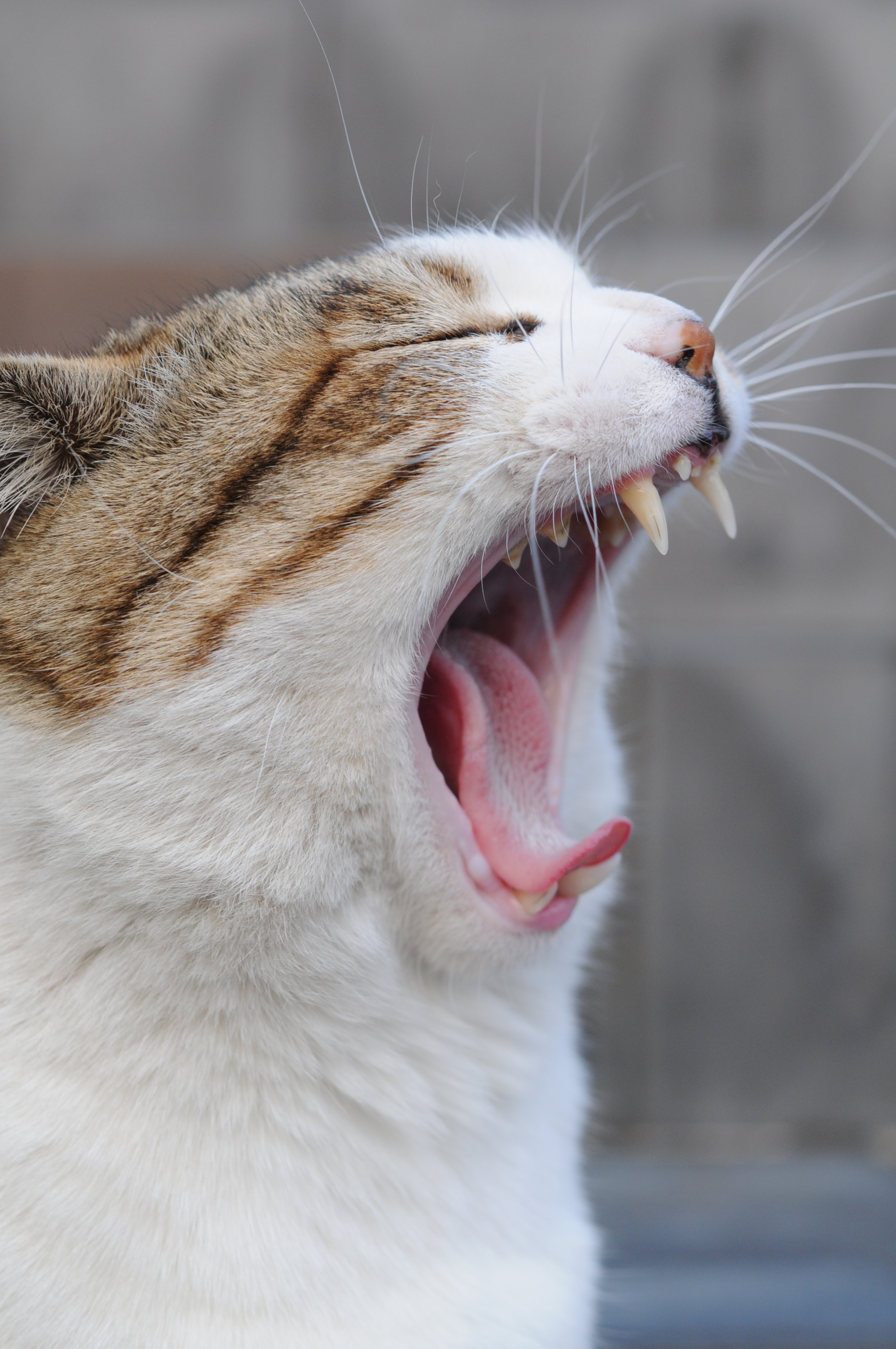
Yawning cat

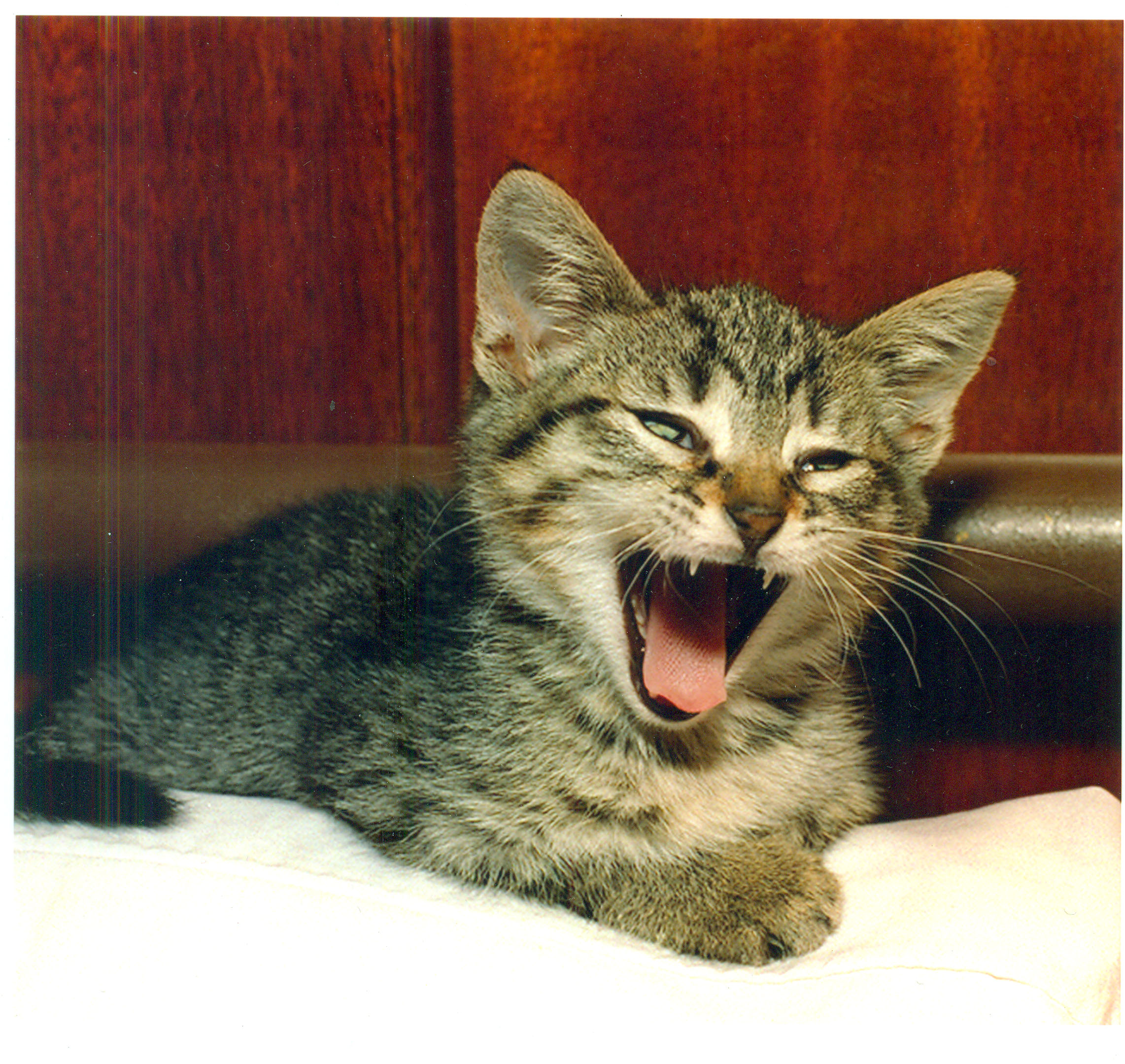
Yawning kitten

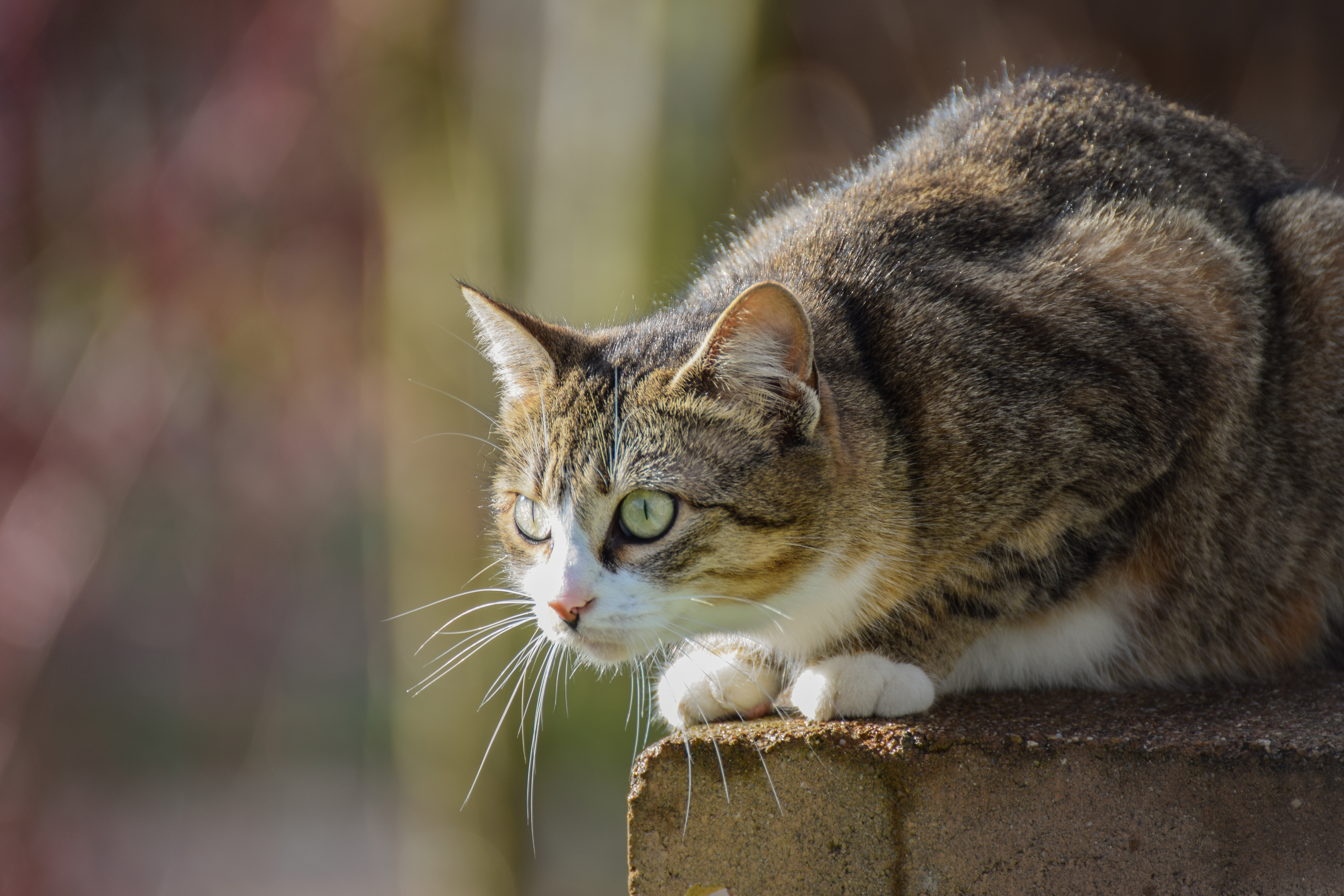
Alert cat

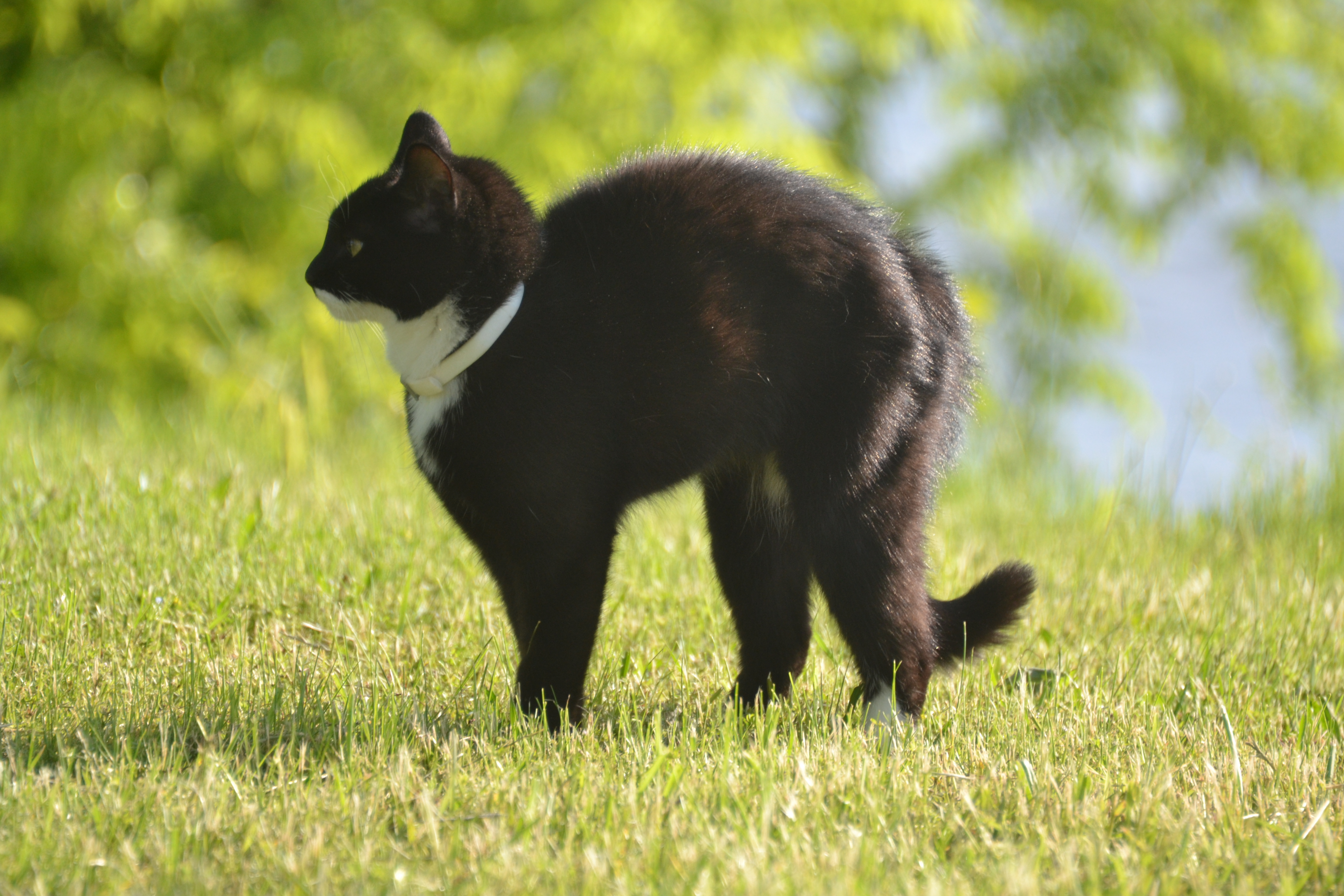
Tense cat

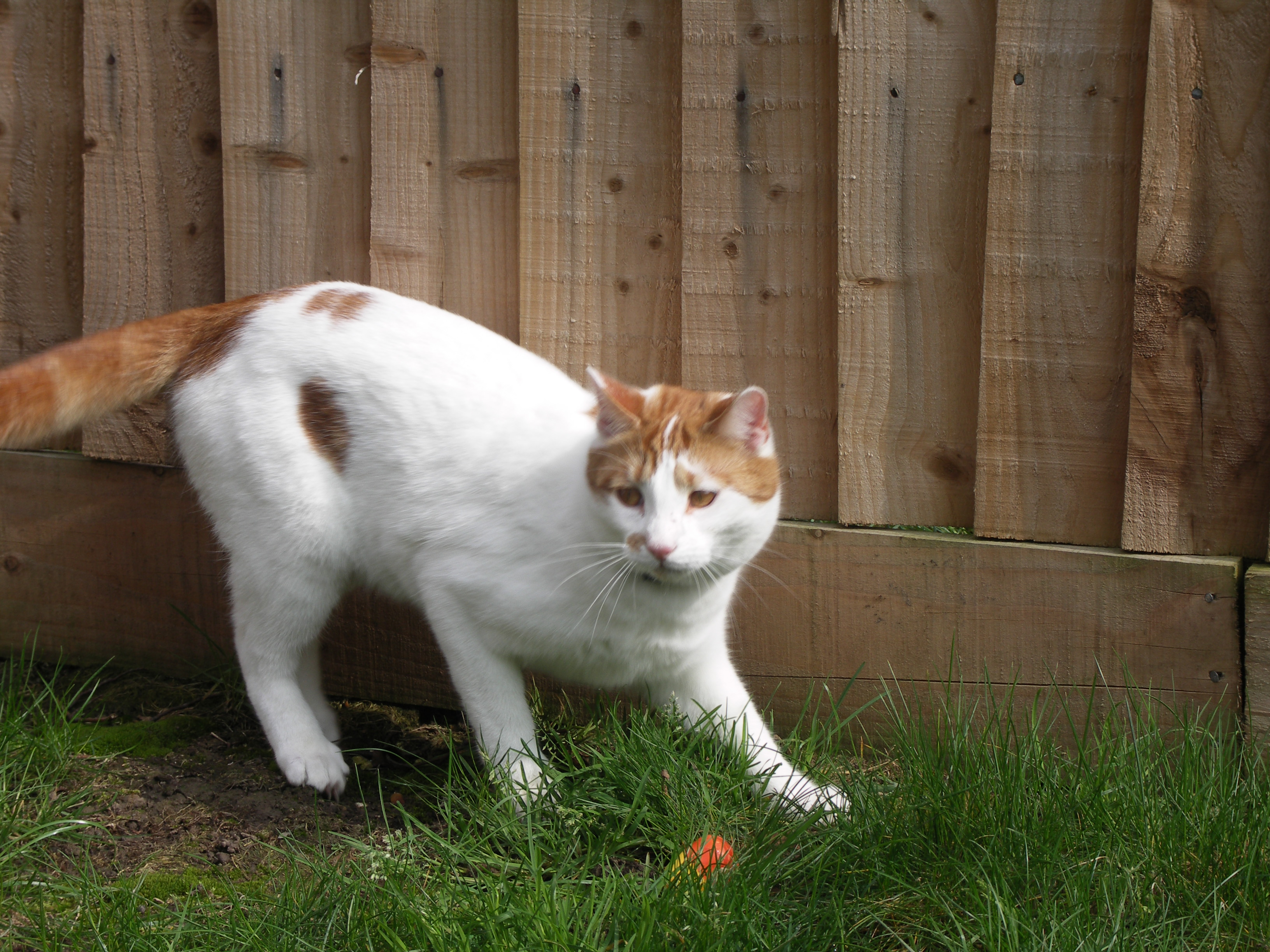
Fearful cat

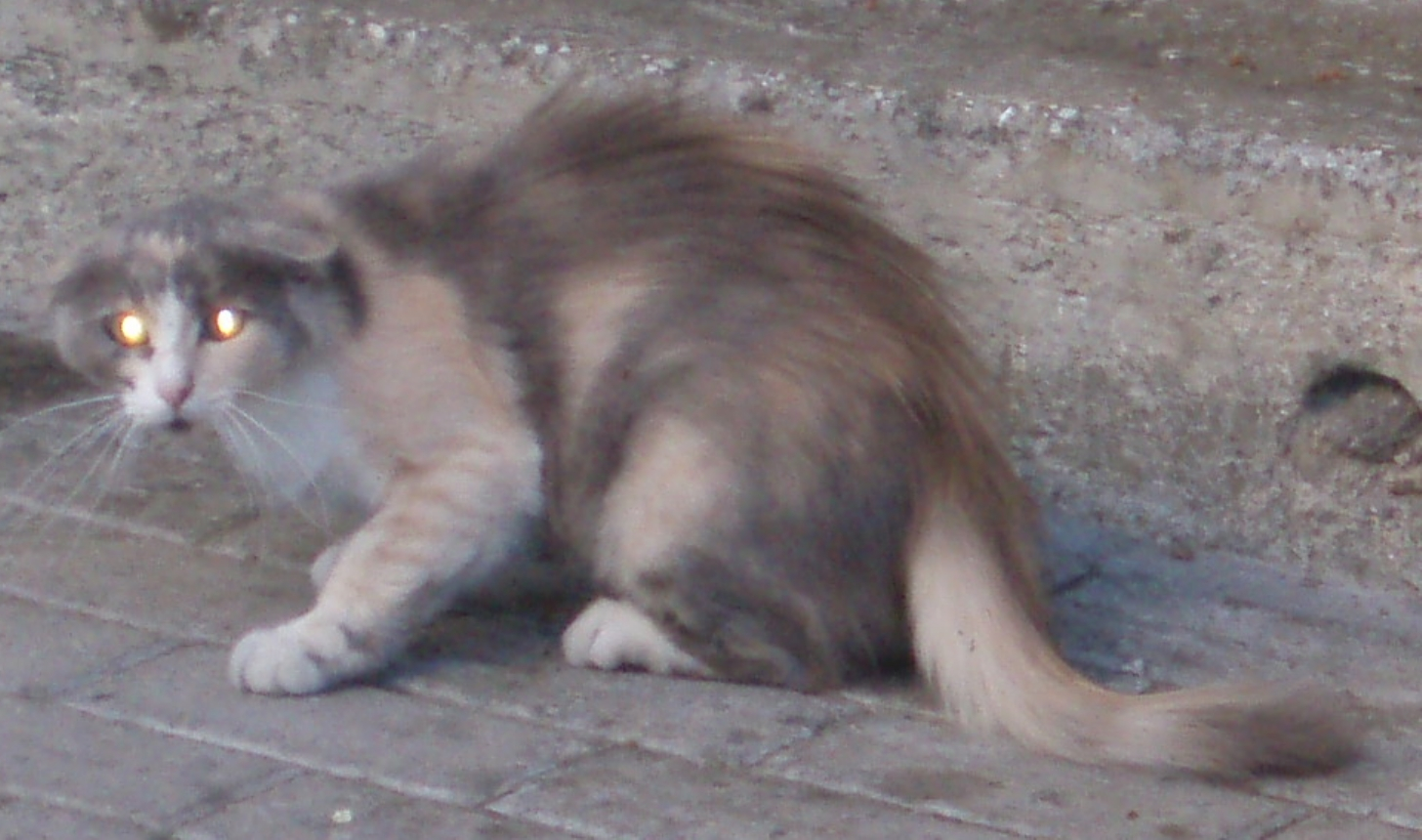
Terrified cat

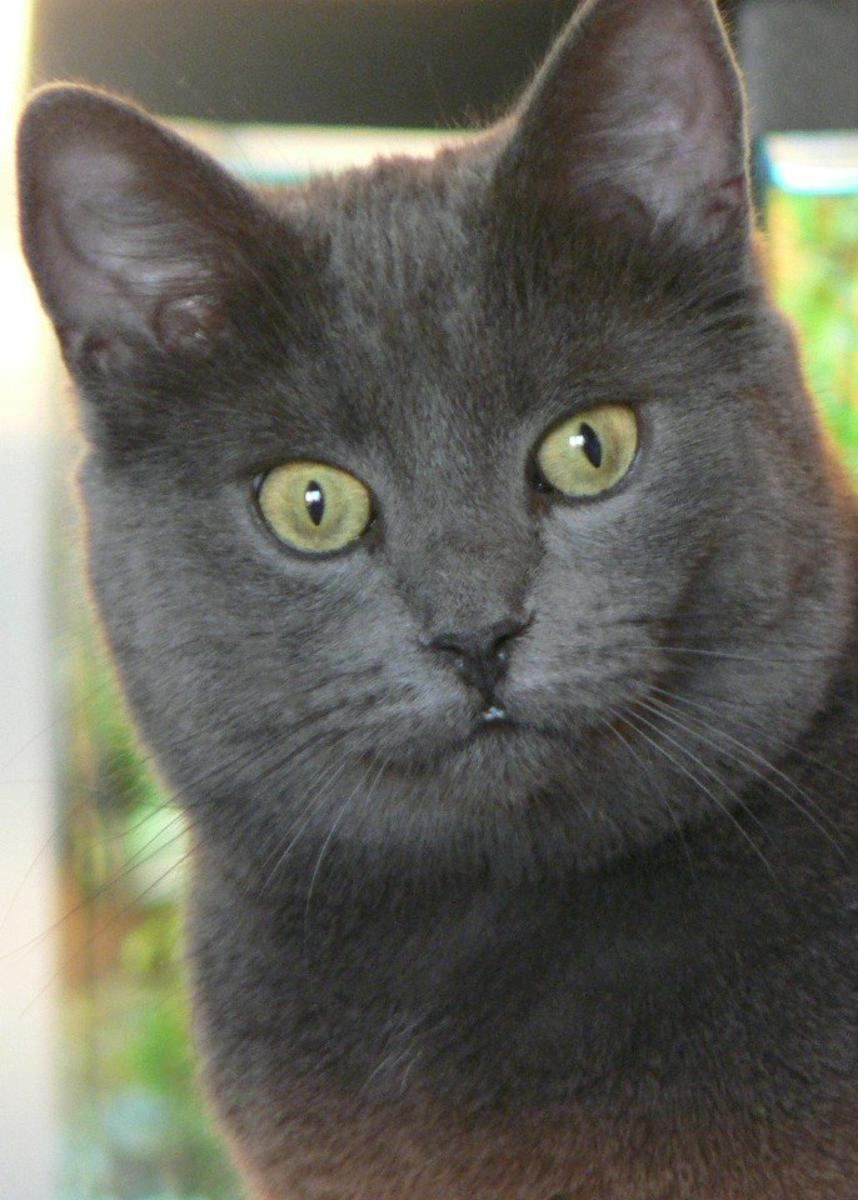
Confused cat

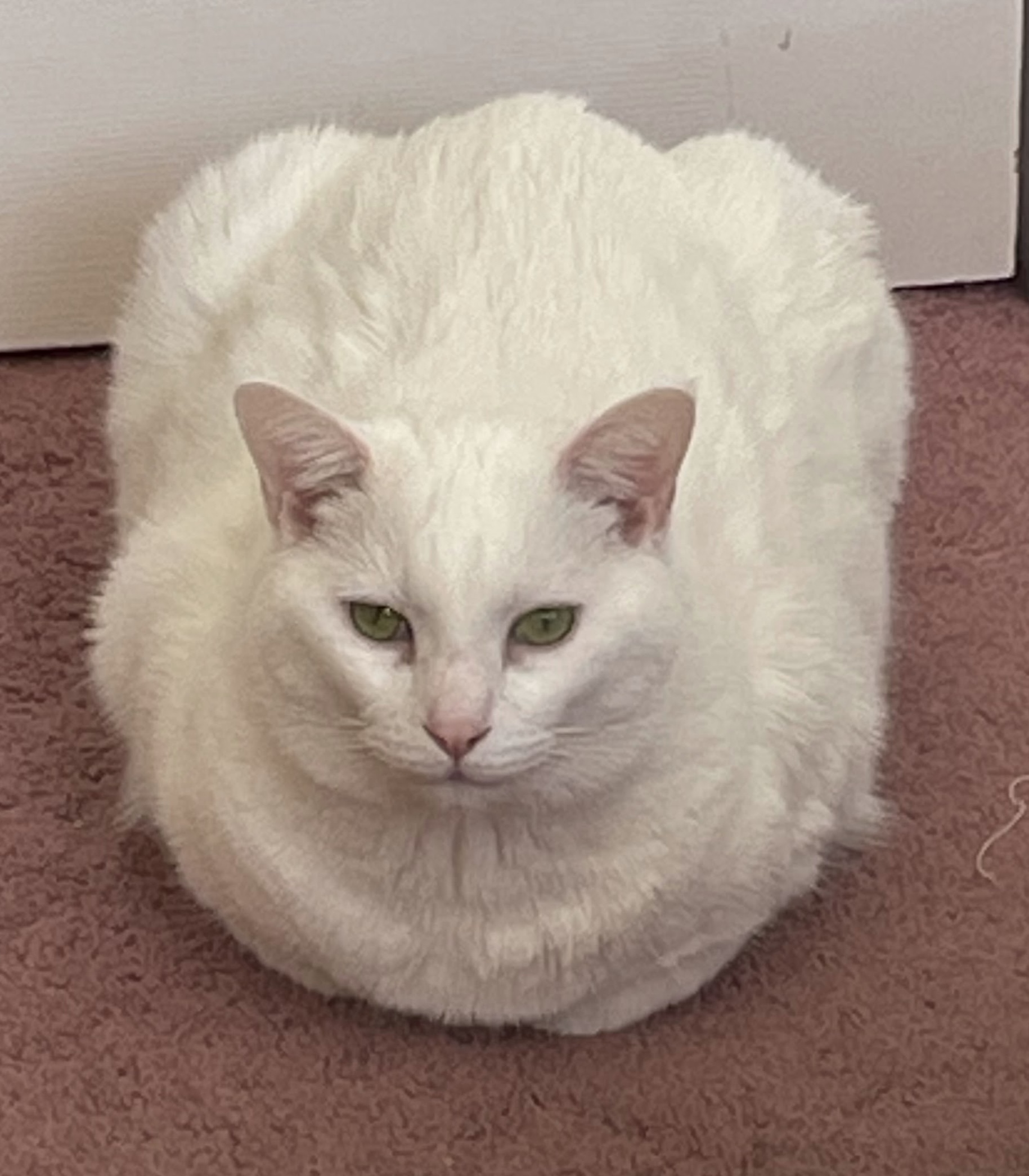
Cat in the 'loaf' position, with its feet tucked under its belly

== Grooming ==
Cat self-grooms and washes its face

Oral grooming for domestic and feral cats is a common behavior; studies on domestic cats show that they spend about 8% of resting time grooming themselves. Grooming is extremely important not only to clean themselves but also to ensure ectoparasite control. Fleas tend to be the most common ectoparasite of cats, and some studies allude to indirect evidence that grooming in cats is effective in removing fleas. Cats do not only use their tongue for grooming to control ectoparasites; scratching may also aid in dislodging fleas from the head and neck.

== Kneading ==
Classic kneading of a cat

Kittens "knead" the breast while suckling, using the forelimbs one at a time in an alternating pattern to push against the mammary glands to stimulate lactation in the mother.

Cats carry these infantile behaviors beyond nursing and into adulthood. Some cats "nurse," i.e. suck, on clothing or bedding during kneading. The cat exerts firm downward pressure with its paw, opening its toes to expose its claws, then closes its claws as it lifts its paw. The process takes place with alternate paws at intervals of one to two seconds. The cat may knead while sitting on its owner's lap, which may prove painful if the cat has sharp claws.

Because most of the preferred "domestic traits" are neotenous, or juvenile traits that persist in the adult, kneading may be a relic juvenile behavior retained in adult domestic cats. It may also stimulate the cat and make it feel good, in the same manner as a human stretching. Kneading is often a precursor to sleeping. Many cats purr while kneading. They also purr mostly when newborn, when feeding, or when trying to feed on their mother's teat. The common association between the two behaviors may corroborate the evidence in favor of the origin of kneading as a remnant instinct.

== Panting ==
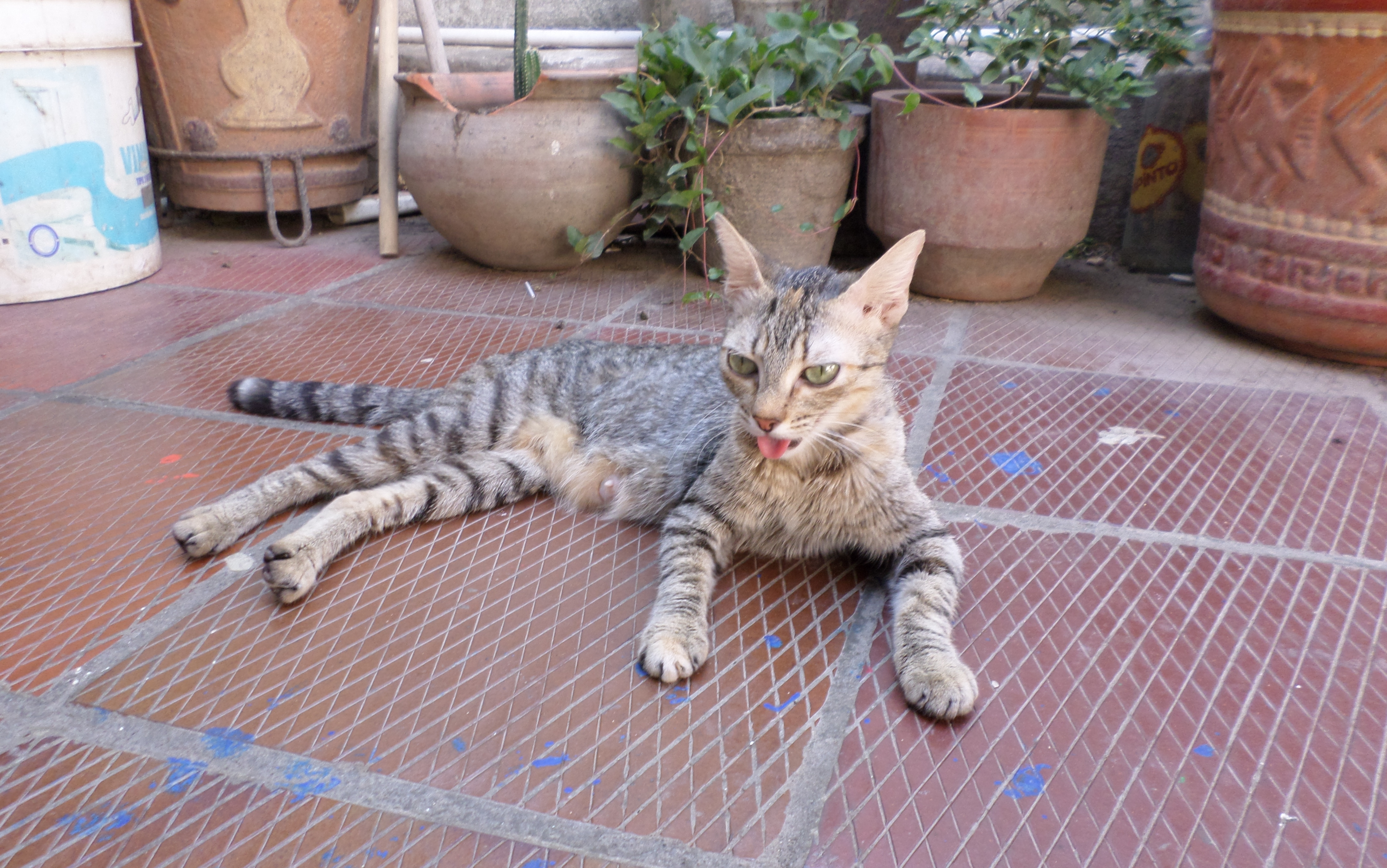
A cat panting

Unlike dogs, panting is a rare occurrence in cats, except in warm weather environments. Cats may pant in response to anxiety, fear or excitement. Panting can also be caused by play, exercise, or stress from things like car rides. However, if panting is excessive or the cat appears in distress, it may be a symptom of a more serious condition, such as a nasal blockage, heartworm disease, head trauma, or drug poisoning. In many cases, feline panting, especially if accompanied by other symptoms, such as coughing or shallow breathing (dyspnea), is considered to be abnormal, and should be treated as a medical emergency.

== Reflexes ==
=== Righting reflex ===
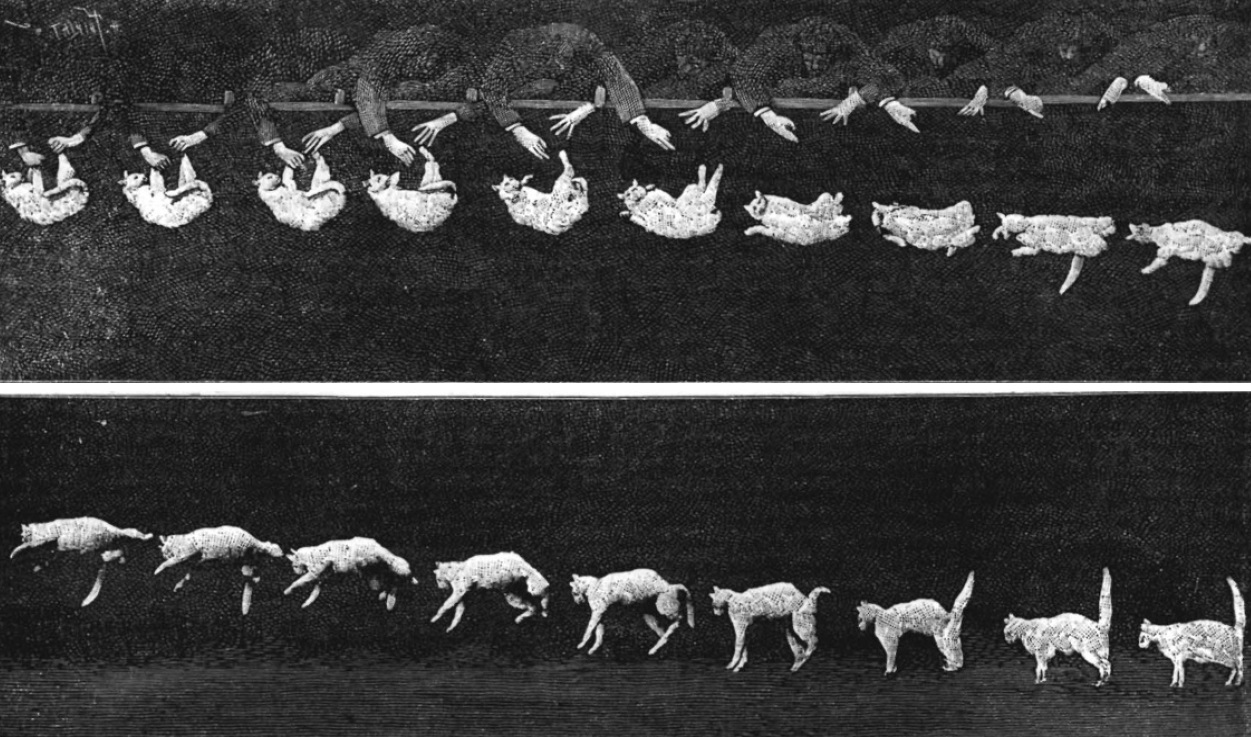
Chronophotography of a falling cat by Étienne-Jules Marey, 1894

The righting reflex is the attempt of cats to land on their feet at the completion of a jump or a fall. They can do this more easily than other animals due to their flexible spine, floating collarbone, and loose skin. Cats also use vision and their vestibular apparatus to help tell which way to turn. They can then stretch themselves out and relax their muscles. The righting reflex does not always result in the cat landing on its feet.

=== Freeze reflex ===
Adult cats are able to make use of pinch-induced behavioural inhibition to induce a "freeze reflex" in their young, which enables them to be transported by the neck without resisting. This reflex, also known as clipnosis, can also be exhibited by adults.

== Eating patterns ==
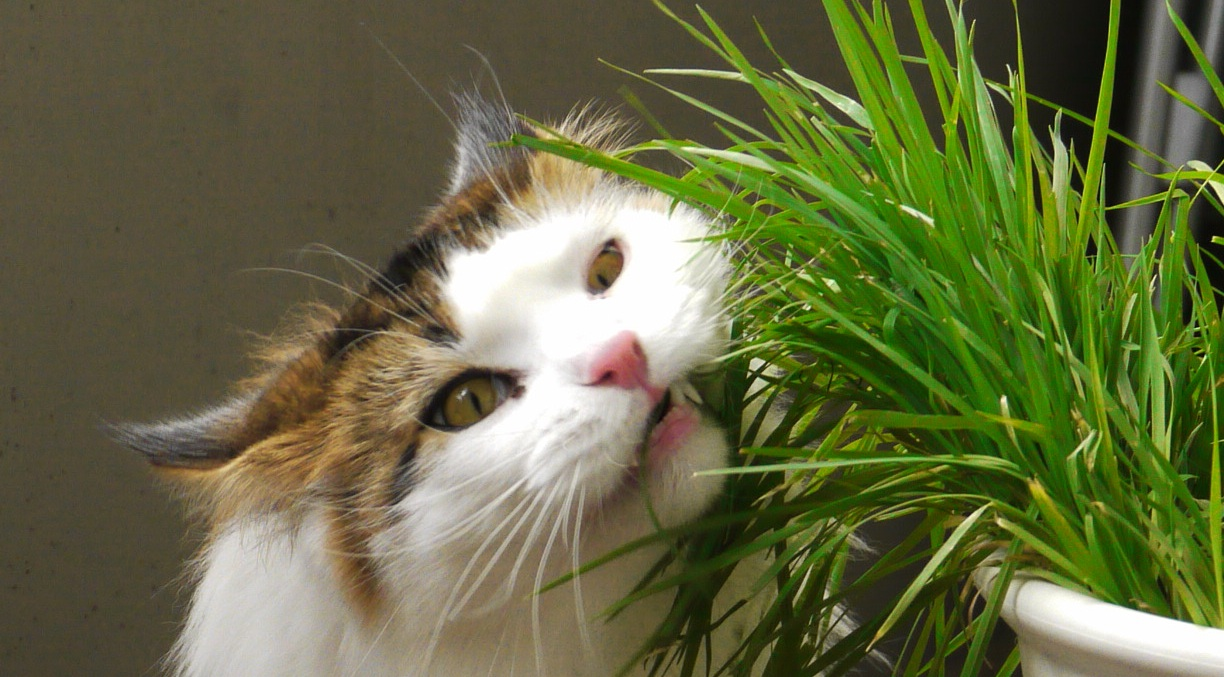
Cat eating "cat grass"

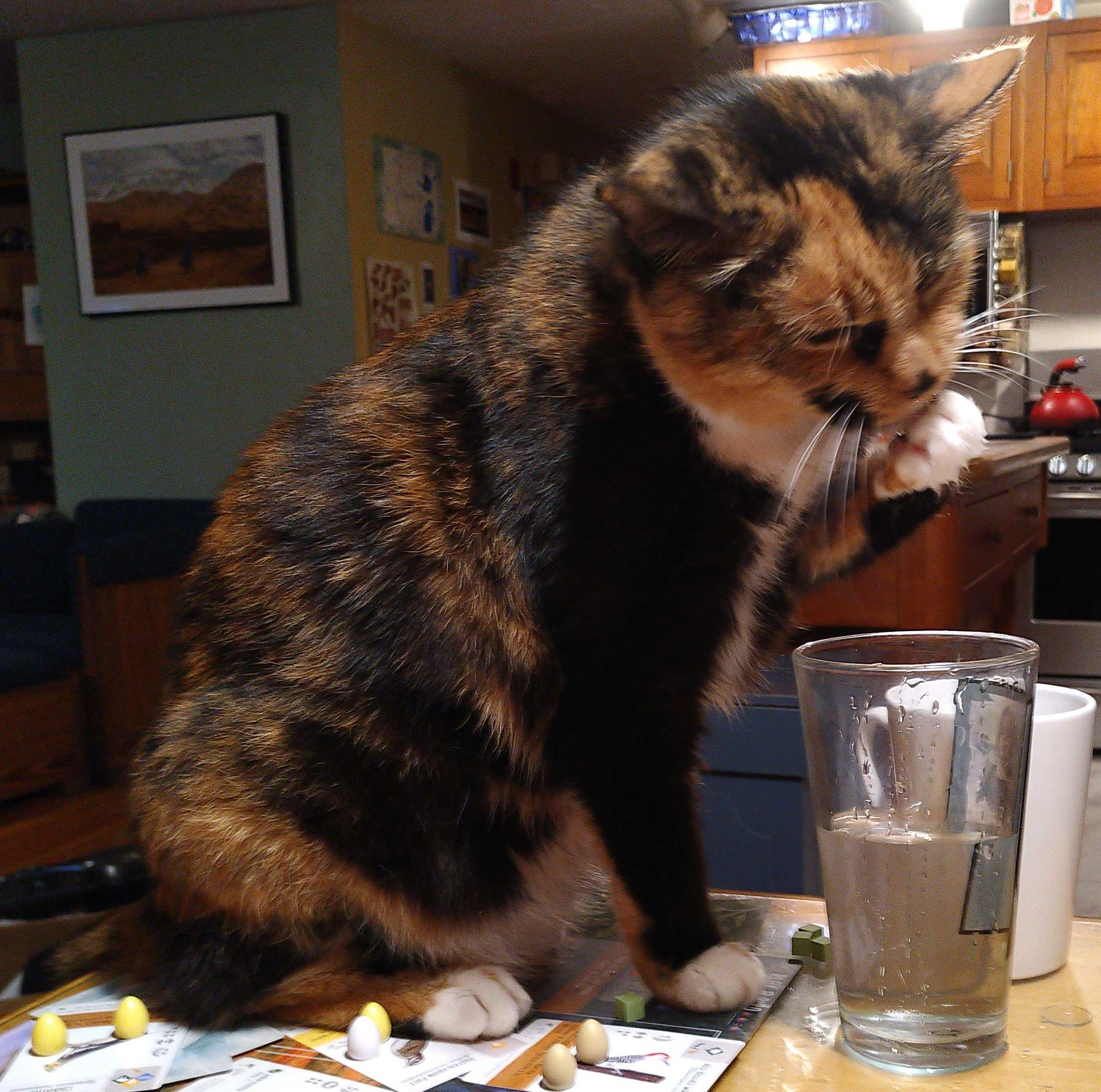
Calico cat drinking water from a glass.

Cats are obligate carnivores and do not do well on herbivore diets. In the wild they usually hunt smaller mammals to keep themselves nourished. Many cats find and chew small quantities of long grass, but this is not for its nutritional value per se. The eating of grass seems to stem from feline ancestry and has nothing to do with dietary requirements. It is believed that feline ancestors instead ate grass to purge intestinal parasites.

Cats have no sweet taste receptors on their tongue and thus cannot taste sweet things at all. Cats mainly smell for their food, and what they taste for is amino acids instead. This may be a cause of cats being diagnosed with diabetes. The food that domestic cats get has a lot of carbohydrates in it, and a high sugar content cannot be efficiently processed by the digestive system of cats.

Cats drink water by lapping the surface with their tongue. A fraction of a teaspoon of water is taken up with each lap. Although some desert cats are able to obtain much of their water needs through the flesh of their prey, most cats come to bodies of water to drink.

Eating patterns are another indicator to understand behavior changes in domestic cats. Changes in typical eating patterns can be an early signal for possible physical or psychological health problems.

A cat's eating pattern in a domestic setting is essential for the cat and owner bond to form. This happens because cats form attachments to households that regularly feed them. Some cats ask for food dozens of times a day, including at night, with rubbing, pacing, meowing, or sometimes loud purring.

== Sleeping patterns ==
Cats are crepuscular, which means they are most active at dawn and dusk. More than half of cats sleep between 12 and 18 hours a day, sometimes even more. Most cats sleep more as they age.

Domestic cats seem to be comparatively flexible with regard to the times of day and night they are active or asleep.

== Excretion ==
Cats tend to bury their feces after defecating and can be attracted to a litter box if it has attractant in it. Cats will also generally defecate more in those litter boxes.

== Socialization ==
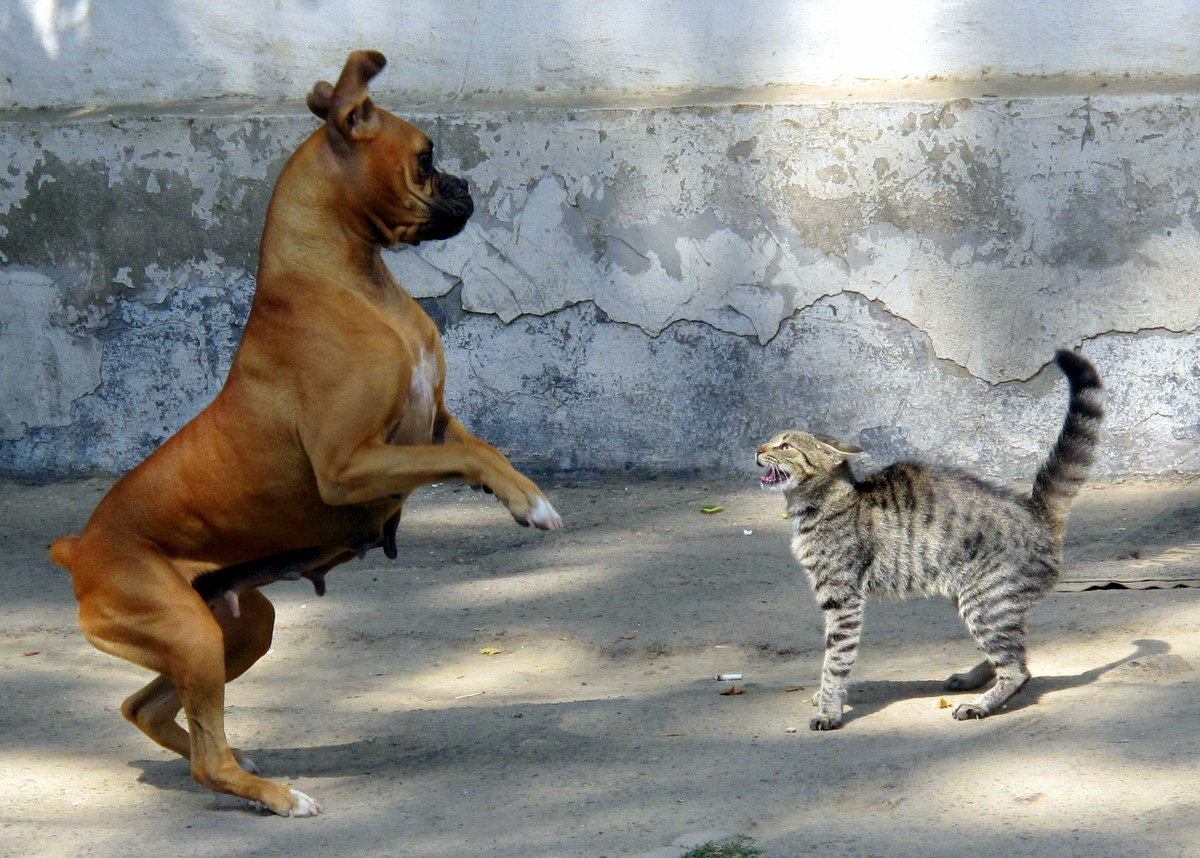
A cat and a dog encountering each other, simultaneously exhibiting a flight response

Socialization is defined as a member of a specific group learning to be part of that group. It is said to be a continuous learning process that allows an individual to learn the necessary skills and behaviors required for a particular social position.

Cats, domestic or wild, do participate in social behaviors, even though it is thought that most cat species (besides lions) are solitary, anti-social animals. Under certain circumstances, such as food availability, shelter, or protection, cats can be seen in groups.

The social behaviors that cats participate in are colony organization, social learning, socialization between cats, and socialization with humans.

=== Colony organization ===
Free-living domestic cats tend to form colonies. Small colonies consist of one female, known as a queen, and her kittens. Large colonies consist of several queens and their kittens. Male cats are present in both types of colonies and serve the purpose of reproduction and defending territory. Reciprocal altruism occurs within these colonies. This means that if an expecting queen helps another queen that just gave birth, then the helping queen will get help in return when she gives birth.

Although free living cats are found in colonies, stable social order, like that of the lion, does not exist. Free living cats usually are found in colonies for protection against predators, and for food availability. Although there are many advantages of group living, such as easy access to mates, and defensive measures to protect food, there are also disadvantages, such as sexual competition for mates. If the group gets too big, fights may break out over food.

=== Social learning ===
Cats are observational learners. This type of learning emerges early in a cat's life, and has been shown in many laboratory studies. Young kittens learn to hunt from their mothers by observing their techniques when catching prey. The mother ensures that her kittens learn hunting techniques by first bringing dead prey to the litter, then live prey. She demonstrates the techniques required for successful capture to her kittens by bringing live prey to the litter for the kittens to catch themselves. Prey-catching behavior of kittens improves over time when mothers are present.

Observational learning for cats can be described in terms of the drive to complete the behavior, the cue that initiates the behavior, the response to the cue, and the reward for completing the behavior. This is shown when cats learn predatory behavior from their mothers. The drive is hunger, the cue is the prey, the response is to catch the prey, and the reward is to relieve the hunger sensation.

Kittens also show observational learning when they are socializing with humans. They are more likely to initiate socialization with humans when their mothers are exhibiting non-aggressive and non-defensive behaviors. Even though mothers spend most time with their kittens, male cats play an important role by breaking up fights among litter mates.

Observational learning is not limited to kittens. It can also be observed during adulthood. Studies have been done with adult cats performing a task, such as pressing a lever after a visual cue. Adult cats that see others performing a task learn to perform the same task faster than those who did not witness another cat performing it.

=== Socialization between cats ===
When strange cats meet, they ideally cautiously allow each other to smell their hindquarters, but this does not happen very often. Usually when strange cats meet, one cat makes a sudden movement that puts the other cat into a defensive mode. The subordinate cat will then draw in on itself and prepare to attack if needed. If an attack happens, the subordinate cat will usually run away, but this does not happen all the time and it could lead to a tomcat duel. Dominance is also seen as an underlying factor for how conspecifics – members of the same species – interact with each other.

Dominance can be seen among cats in multi-cat households. It can be seen when other cats submit to the dominant cat. Dominance includes such behaviors as the subordinate cat walking around the dominant cat, waiting for the dominant cat to walk past, avoiding eye contact, crouching, lying on its side (defensive posture), and retreating when the dominant cat approaches. The dominant cat presents a specific body posture as well. Its ears are straight up, the base of its tail is arched, and it looks directly at the subordinate cat. Dominant cats are usually not aggressive, but if a subordinate cat blocks food they may become aggressive. When this aggressive behavior occurs, it can also lead to the dominant cat preventing subordinate cats from eating and using the litter box. This can cause the subordinate cat to defecate somewhere else and create problems with human interaction.

==== Social conflicts ====
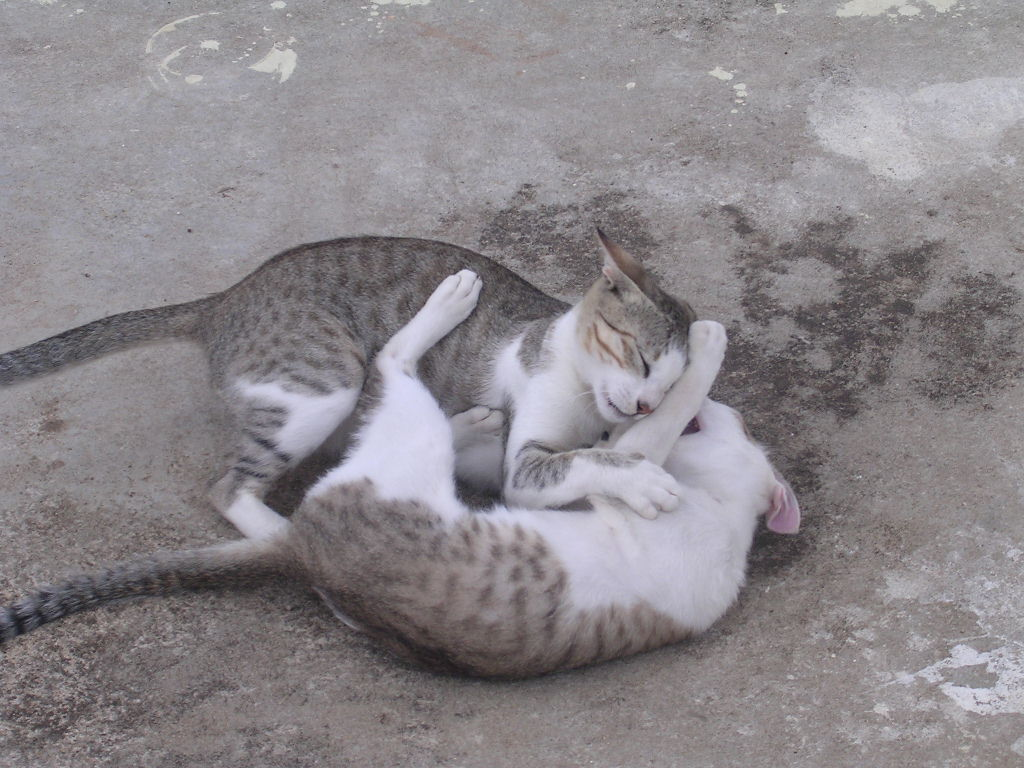
Two cats fighting

Social conflicts among cats depend solely on the behavior of the cats. Some research has shown that cats rarely pick fights, but when they do, it's usually for protecting food and/or litters, and defending territory.

The first sign of an imminent tomcat duel is when both cats draw themselves up high on their legs, all hair along the middle of their backs stands straight up, and they mew and howl loudly as they approach each other. The steps the cats make become slower and shorter the closer they get to each other. Once they are close enough to attack, they pause slightly, and then one cat leaps and tries to bite the nape of the other cat. The other cat has no choice but to retaliate, and both cats roll aggressively on the ground, with loud and intense screams by both. After some time the cats separate and stand face to face to begin the attack all over again. This can go on for some time until one cat does not get up again and remains seated. The defeated cat does not move until the victor has completed a sniff of the area and moves outside the fighting area. Once this happens, the defeated cat leaves the area, ending the duel.

Females may also fight with each other, and male-female fights can occur as well. Cats may need to be reintroduced or separated to avoid fights in a closed household.

=== Socialization with humans ===
One way cats and humans interact is through "headbutting," in which a cat rubs its head on a human in order to leave its scent to claim territory and create a bond. Cats can sometimes take cues from human pointing and from the direction of human gazes. They can sometimes discriminate between, and sometimes even correlate, human facial expressions, attentional states, and voices. Besides its own name, a cat can sometimes learn the names of humans and other cats.

Cats aged three to nine weeks are sensitive to human socialization; after this period socialization can be less effective. Studies have shown that the earlier a kitten is handled, the less fearful it will be toward humans. Other factors that can enhance socialization are having many people handle the kitten frequently, the presence of the mother, and feeding. The presence of the mother is important because cats are observational learners. If the mother is comfortable around humans, it can reduce anxiety in the kitten and promote the kitten-human relationship.

Feral kittens around two to seven weeks old can be socialized, usually within a month of capture. Some species of cats cannot be socialized toward humans because of factors such as genetic influence and in some cases specific learning experiences. The best way to get a kitten to socialize is to handle it for many hours a week. The process is made easier if there is another socialized cat present but not necessarily in the same space as the feral cat. If the handler can get a cat to urinate in the litter tray, then the others in a litter will usually follow. Initial contact with thick gloves is highly recommended until trust is established, usually within the first week. Socializing an adult is challenging. Socialized adult feral cats tend to trust only those they trusted in their socialization period, and can be very fearful around strangers.

Cats can be companion animals. Studies have shown that these cats provide many physiological and psychological benefits for the owner. Other aspects of cat behavior that are deemed advantageous for the human-cat bond are cat hygiene (cats are known for good hygiene) and they do not have to be taken outside (use of the litter box). Cats are perfect for smaller spaces, and they have no problems with being left alone for extended periods. Even though there are a number of benefits of owning a cat, there are a number of problematic behaviors that can affect the human-cat relationship. One behavior is when cats attack people by clawing and biting. This often occurs spontaneously or is triggered by sudden movements. Another problematic behavior is the "petting and biting syndrome", which involves the cat being petted and then suddenly attacking and running away. Other problems are house soiling, scratching furniture, and when a cat brings dead prey into the house.

There are 52 measured personality traits in cats, with one study saying "five reliable personality factors were found using principal axis factor analysis: neuroticism, extroversion, dominance, impulsiveness and agreeableness." This study asked cat owners to rate their pets on 52 personality traits using a survey. Descriptions of the main 5 personality traits that were found can be summarized as follows:

- Neuroticism: shy, stressed, anxious, insecure, tense. Cats falling into this category may like hiding places and quiet areas within the home.
- Extroversion: active, curious, inventive, smart, vigilant. Cats falling into this category may like extra toys and sensory items to prevent boredom and room to run.
- Dominance: bullying, aggressive, dominant. Cats in this category may need to be the only cat or pet in a household to prevent harm or injury.
- Impulsiveness: reckless, erratic, impulsive. Cats in this category may need a calmer environment with predictable routines.
- Agreeableness: affectionate, friendly, gentle. Cats that fall in this category are typically well-adjusted and happy.

== Predatory behavior ==
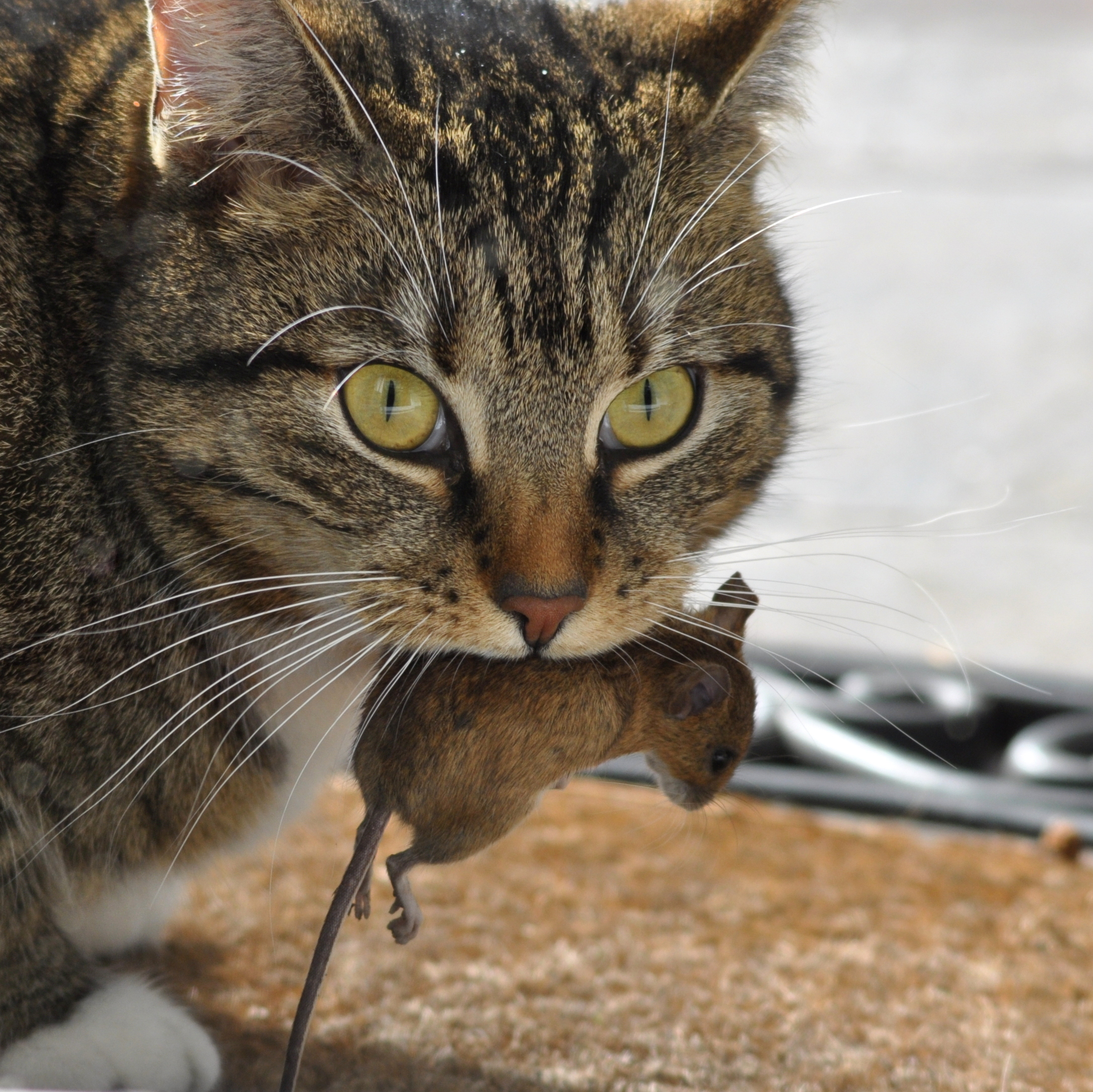
A domestic cat with its prey, a deer mouse

Cats are natural predators. When allowed to roam outdoors, many cats will engage in predation on wildlife, as they are a serious threat to wildlife species. Understanding an indoor cat's personality can go a long way toward satisfying their instincts and avoid potentially inconvenient behavior (such as sudden hissing, dashing around the house, or climbing the curtains). Environmental enrichment items include:

- A good-sized cat tree, with scratching posts
- Toys that provide a release for their predatory instincts
- A well kept litter box or toilet
- Fresh water and dry cat food
- Social interaction

Attack/Hunting Behavior

Although they are natural predators, pet cats tend to only hunt what is most available to them, around where they live. So, if moved to different areas, they can switch between prey depending on their availability.

When cats encounter prey, they try to make themselves as quiet and as small as possible, to avoid their prey running from them. Before pouncing at the prey, they push their behinds up into the air and "shake" them with their head low to the ground and paws in front of them so that they can prepare for dismount, or to pounce at their prey. The cat remains extremely tense before springing forward to strike their prey with their paws. When they have difficult access to their prey, such as in small pools of water or holes, they use their paws to "fish" out their food and reach into such areas effectively. When cats finally have control of their food, they tend to cuff or push the prey about, almost playfully. Cats also do something known as "prey shaking" which includes holding their prey in their mouths, and shaking their heads to successfully kill or disorient their prey. If their prey is not dead after this, one or two bites will do.

Post Hunting Behavior

When their prey is finally dead, they bite them for quite some time, up and down the length of the body. During this time they are picked up and held in their mouths. They chew and pull at their prey using their molars, for grinding. They start at the anterior end of the animal, near its head, enabling them to eat their smaller prey in as fast as one minute. They eat in a crouched position, holding down the victim with their paw(s). Note that while they attack, they do not bite off pieces of the prey until they are dead.

== Environment ==
Cats like to organize their environment based on their needs. Like their ancestors, domestic cats still have an inherent desire to maintain an independent territory but are generally content to live with other cats for company as they easily get bored. Living alone for a longer time may cause them to forget how to communicate with other cats.

Sometimes adding a kitten to a household can be a bad idea. If there already is an older cat present and another cat is added, it may be better to get another older cat that has been socialized with other cats. When a kitten is introduced to a mature cat, that cat may show feline asocial aggression, in which they feel threatened and act aggressive to drive off the intruder. If this happens, the kitten and the cat should be separated and slowly introduced by rubbing towels on the animals and presenting the towel to the other.

Cats use scent and pheromones to help organize their territory by marking prominent objects. If these objects or scents are removed, it upsets the cat's perception of its environment.

== See also ==
- Cat behaviorist
- Cat communication
- Cat play and toys
- Ethology
- Cat training
