= Nape =

Back of the neck

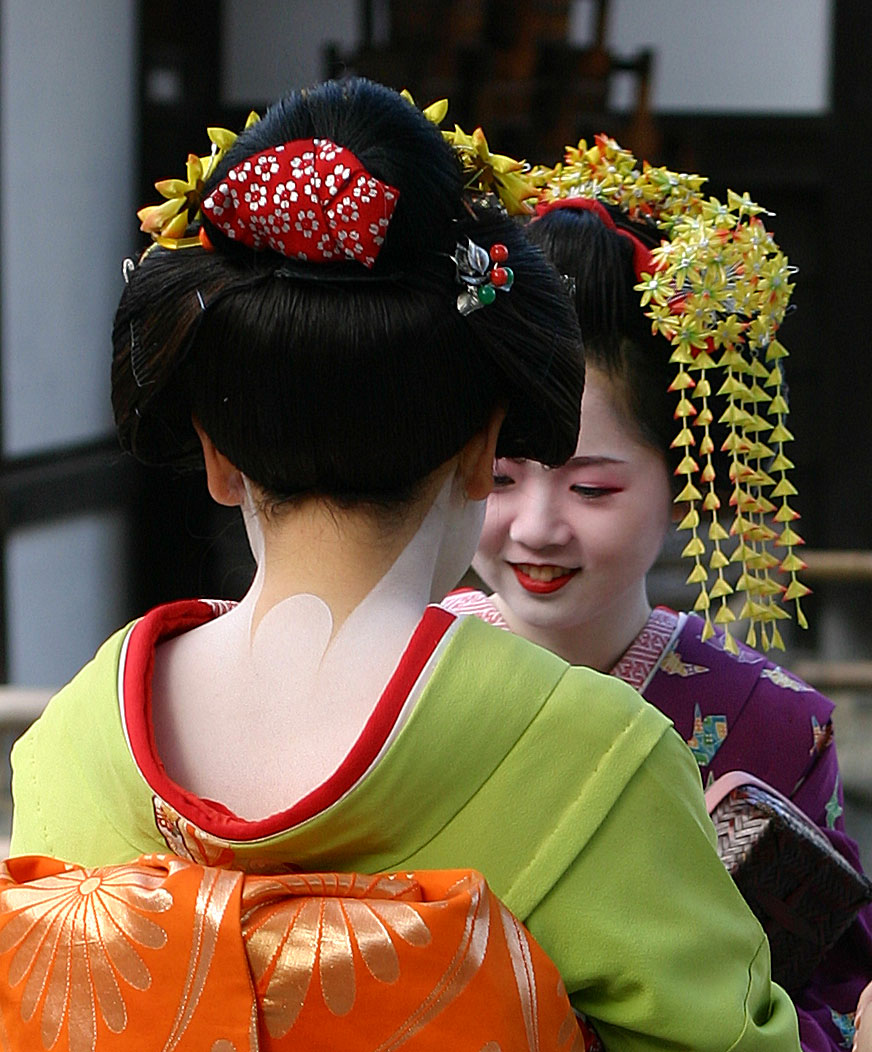
The uncovered nape of a maiko's neck

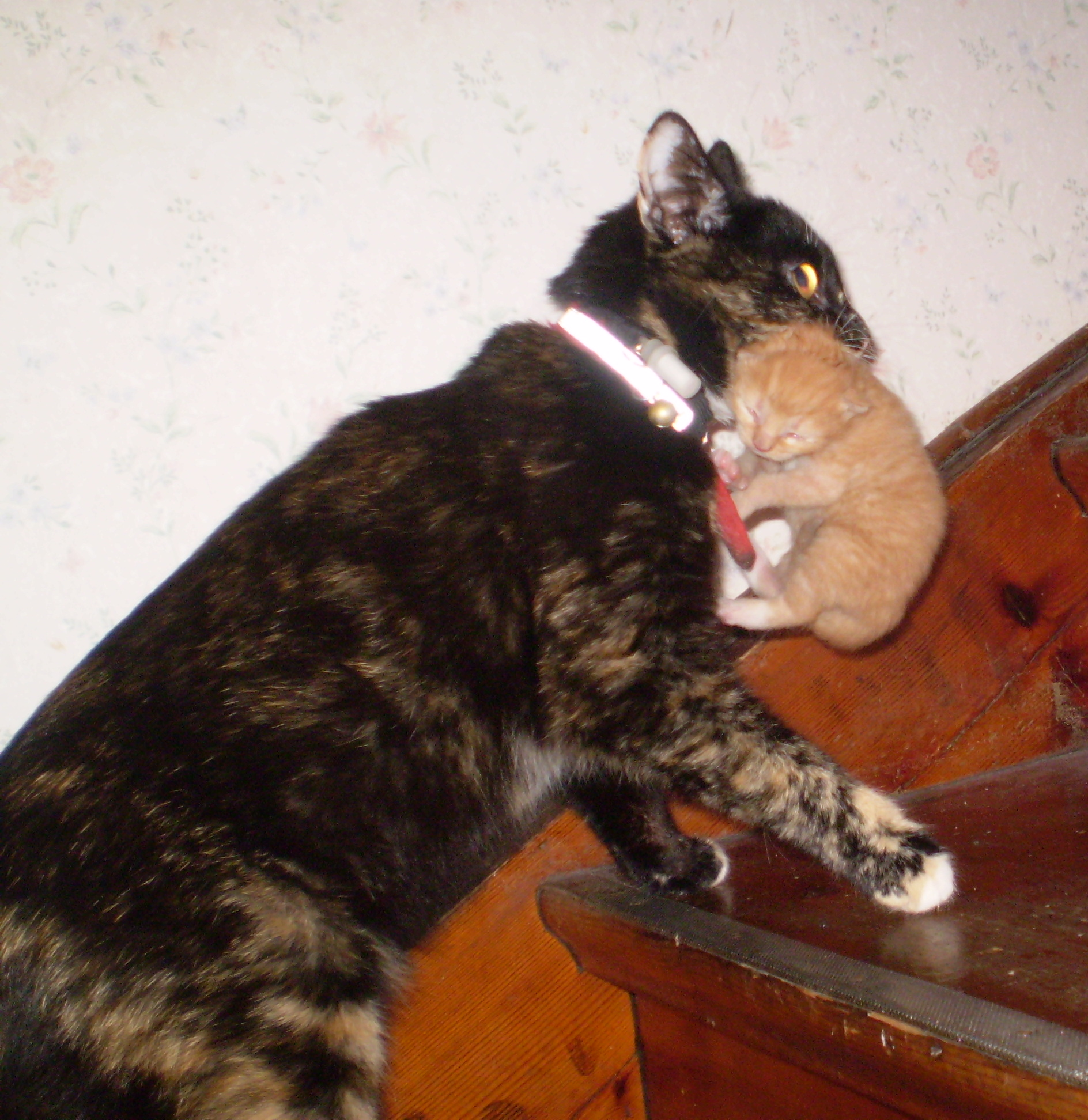
Cat carrying a kitten by its nape, known as the "scruff"

The nape is the back of the neck. In technical anatomical/medical terminology, the nape is also called the nucha (from the Medieval Latin rendering of the Arabic نُخَاع, 'spinal marrow'). The corresponding adjective is nuchal, as in the term nuchal rigidity for neck stiffness.

In many mammals, the nape bears a loose, non-sensitive area of skin, known as the scruff, by which a mother carries her young by her teeth, temporarily immobilizing it during transport. In the mating of cats, the male will grip the female's scruff with his teeth to help immobilize her during the act, a form of pinch-induced behavioral inhibition.

== Cultural connotations ==
In traditional Japanese culture, the nape (項, unaji) was one of the few areas of the body (other than face and hands) left uncovered by women's attire. The nape of a woman's neck held a strong attraction for many Japanese men (see oshiroi).

In Egyptian and Lebanese culture, slapping the nape is considered a gesture of utter humiliation.
