= Cat grass =

Grasses grown for domestic cats to eat

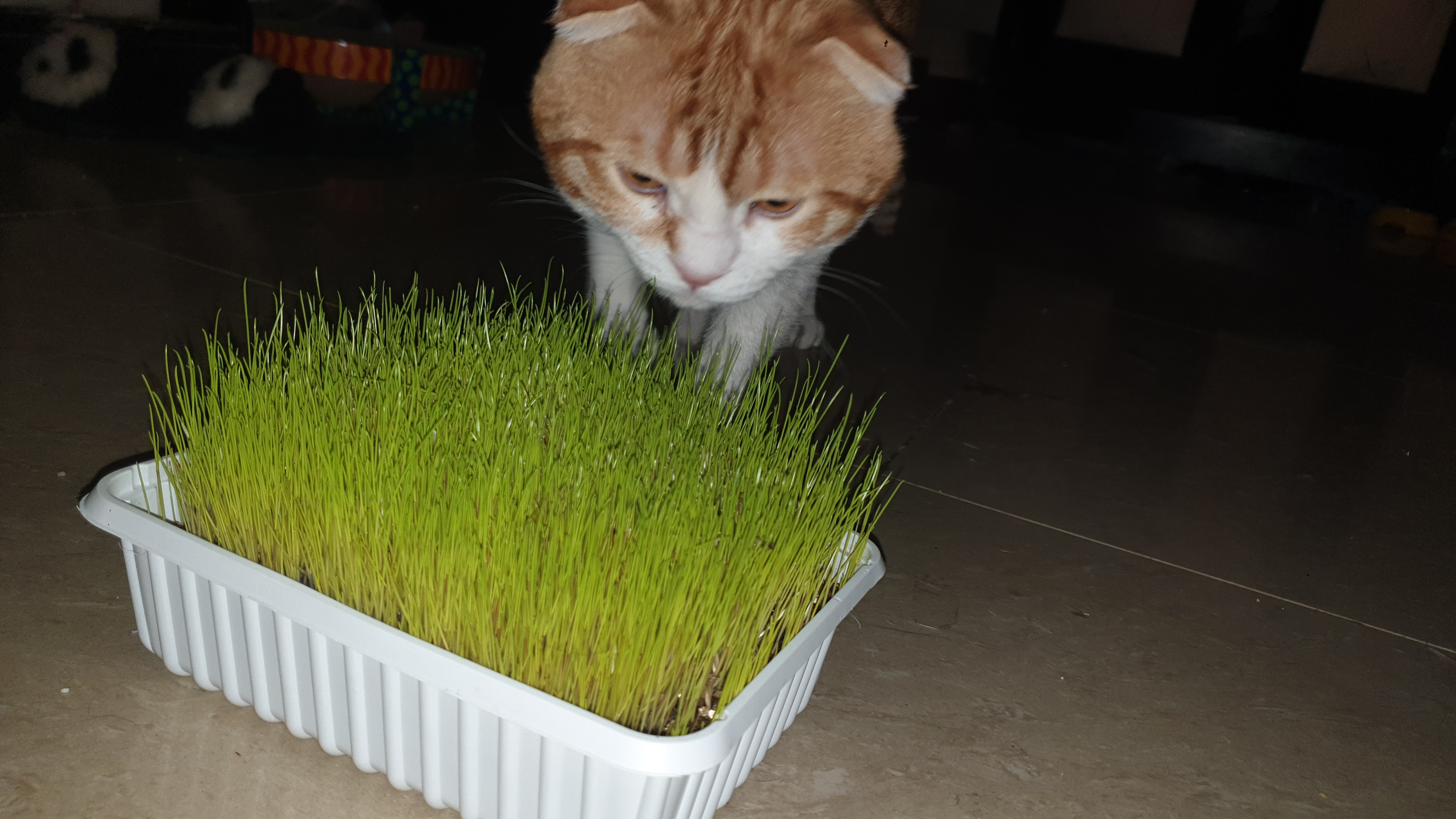
A cat and cat grass

Cat grass is the colloquial term for trays or pots of young cereal grasses, most commonly wheat (Triticum aestivum), barley (Hordeum vulgare), oat (Avena sativa), and sometimes rye (Secale cereale), that are grown indoors for cats to chew. Catnip (Nepeta cataria) and other iridoid-rich plants are usually not included in the term, as they primarily elicit rubbing and rolling behavior rather than ingestion.

The most common stated benefit of cat grass for the pet is to aid the passing of hairballs.

== Cultivation and availability ==
Commercial and home-grown cat grass typically comprises wheatgrass, barley grass, oat grass, and/or rye, sown densely and cut or presented at the sprout/microgreen stage (about 7–14 days). Cereal grasses at this stage of growth are rich in fiber (including soluble fractions), chlorophyll, and water-soluble vitamins (e.g. some B vitamins).

Cat grass is widely available in seed kits, ready-to-grow pouches, and live trays.

Cat grass can be grown indoors year-round in shallow trays using potting media or hydroponic mats. The process is similar to growing wheatgrass microgreens, and advice for the latter is commonly repurposed to guide "cat grass" cultivation. General microgreen guidance recommends dense sowing, 1–3 days of dark "germination" with high humidity, bright light after emergence, good air movement to reduce mold, and harvest/presentation within 1–2 weeks.

== Use ==
External image
- Scanning electron micrograph: leaf serrations/trichomes interlocking with hair

Cat grass use by domestic cats is common, and is viewed positively in many cultures.

Many "carnivorous" species also ingest plants, with ethological function dependent on species, context, and plant type. Domestic cats are believed to consume grasses primarily for their fiber content. In this regard, cat grass supplants nibbling on houseplants or lawn grasses.

Cats may use plant fibers to help pass hairballs. A 2025 microscopy study of regurgitated matter found leaf trichomes interlocked with hair. Nevertheless, pet cat owners in surveys have not observed behavioral changes to support this hypothesis.

Persistent vomiting warrants clinical evaluation to rule out gastrointestinal disease.

== See also ==
- Catnip
- Cat § Hunting and feeding
- Environmental enrichment (animals)
