= Pinch-induced behavioral inhibition =

Immobility resulting from squeezing the nape of the neck

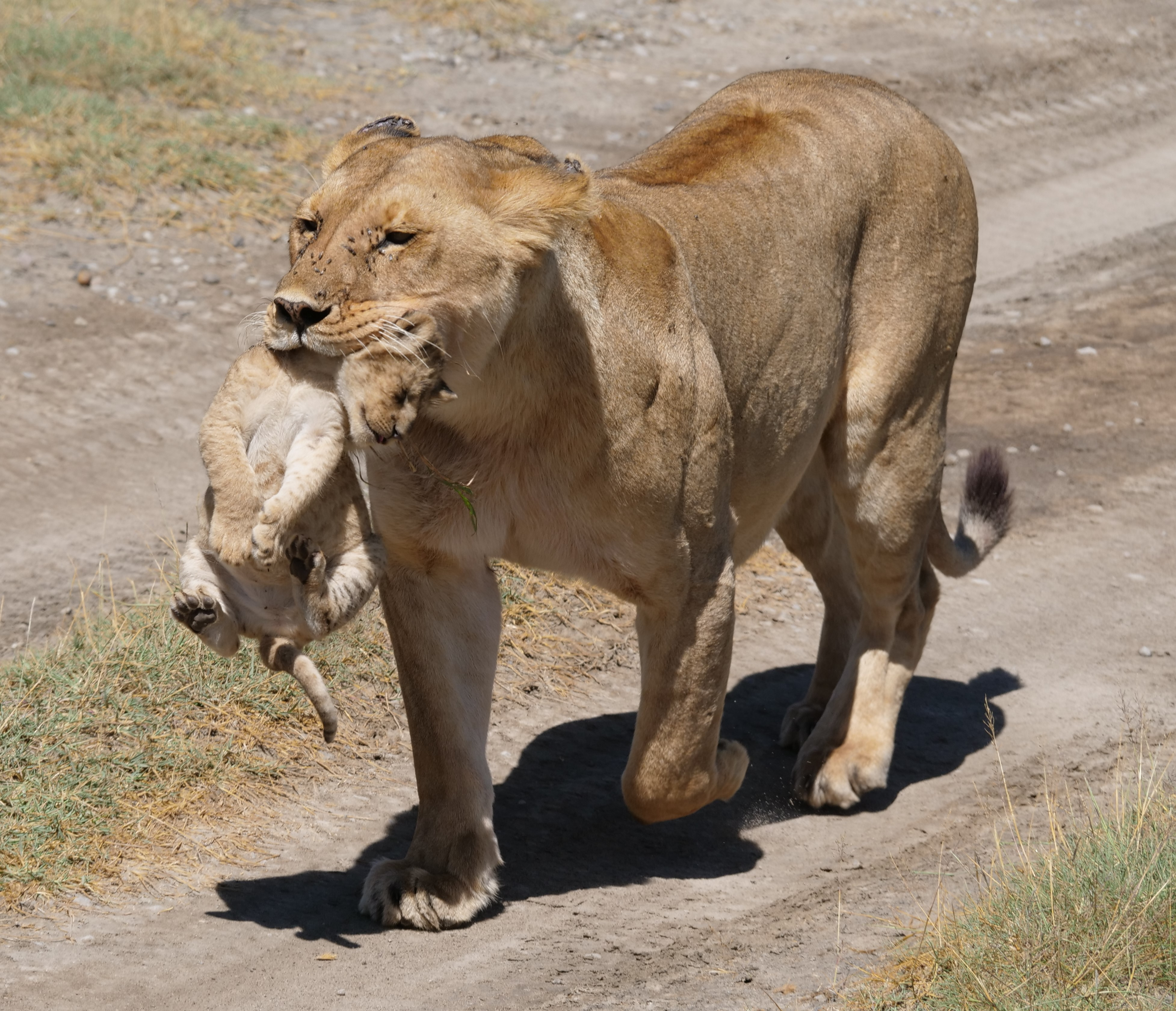
Lioness carrying a cub.

Pinch-induced behavioral inhibition (PIBI), also called dorsal immobility, transport immobility, clipnosis, or scruffing, is a partially inert state that results from a gentle squeeze of the nape, the skin at the back of the neck. It is mostly observed among cats and allows a mother cat to carry her kitten easily with her jaws. It can be used to restrain most cats effectively in a domestic or veterinary context, however it is no longer recommended as studies have shown significant fear-anxiety responses and aversion in cats who have this technique used on them. The phenomenon also occurs in other animals, such as squirrels and mice.

== See also ==
- Tonic immobility
- Vulcan Nerve Pinch
