= Jackson Galaxy =

American cat behaviorist and television personality (born 1966)

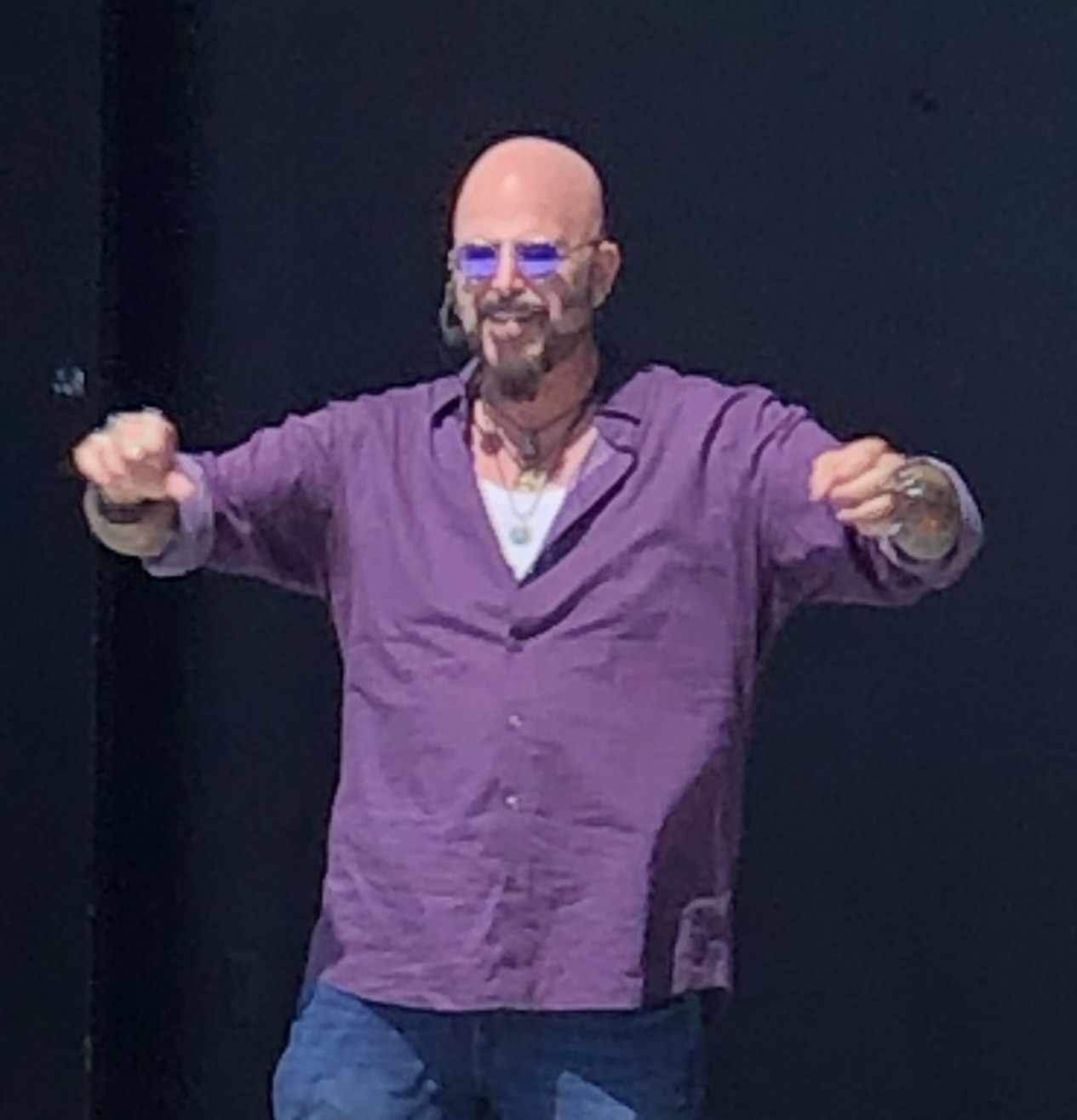
- Jackson Galaxy in 2019
- Born: Richard Kurschner; April 28, 1966 (age 60); New York City, U.S.
- Occupations: Cat behaviorist Television host
- Years active: 2002–present
- Television: My Cat from Hell
- Spouse: Minoo Rahbar (m. 2014)
- Website: jacksongalaxy.com

Jackson Galaxy (born Richard Kurschner; April 28, 1966) is an American cat behaviorist, YouTuber, and former host of the television show My Cat from Hell.

== Early life ==
Jackson Galaxy was born to a Jewish refugee father from Budapest, Hungary (Central Europe) in Manhattan, New York City, New York, and was raised on Manhattan's Upper West Side. At age ten, he began playing the guitar, aspiring to be a professional rock musician.

Galaxy graduated from the University of Iowa in 1991 with a theater degree.

== Career ==
Galaxy moved to Boulder, Colorado in 1992 and was a budding rock musician. He learned cat behavior through his work with rescue cats, originally with the Humane Society of Boulder Valley. After working there and at other animal shelters, he went into private practice as a cat consultant in 2002, co-founding Little Big Cat, Inc., with Jean Hofve, a holistic veterinarian. Together they provided consultations to cat owners, focusing on the connection between physical and behavioral health.

Beginning in May 2011 through 2020, Galaxy starred in My Cat From Hell, a reality TV series produced by Animal Planet in which he helps cat guardians—often couples—resolve conflict and behavioral issues between them and their cats. From December 2013, he has been host of the web series Cat Mojo on the Animalist Network, where he shares his thoughts on cat-related issues like declawing, use of squirt guns and behind-the-scenes stories. He now runs a YouTube Channel and sells his own line of cat toys and supplements.

Galaxy is the author of several books about cats and their behavior. He has two books on adapting your home to make it more cat friendly—a process he deems "catification". In 2012, he published the autobiographical Cat Daddy: What the World's Most Incorrigible Cat Taught Me About Life, Love, and Coming Clean. Other books include: Catification (2014), Catify to Satisfy (2015), and Total Cat Mojo (2020).

== Personal life ==
Galaxy is a recovered addict to alcohol and drugs. After his weight reached 400 lb (180 kg) and suffering several health problems, Galaxy underwent gastric bypass surgery in 2007. He maintains a vegan diet.

== Publications ==
- with Joel Derfner (2012): Cat Daddy: What the World's Most Incorrigible Cat Taught Me About Life, Love, and Coming Clean. New York: Tarcher/Penguin. ISBN 978-1585429370.
- with Kate Benjamin (2014): Catification: Designing a Happy and Stylish Home for Your Cat (and You!). New York: Tarcher/Penguin. ISBN 978-0399166013.
- with Kate Benjamin (2015): Catify to Satisfy: Simple Solutions for Creating a Cat-Friendly Home. New York: Tarcher/Penguin. ISBN 978-0399176999.
- with Mikel Delgado (2017): Total Cat Mojo: The Ultimate Guide to Life with Your Cat. New York: Tarcher/Penguin. ISBN 978-0143131618.
