= Animal training =

Teaching animals specific responses to specific conditions or stimuli

Animal trainer
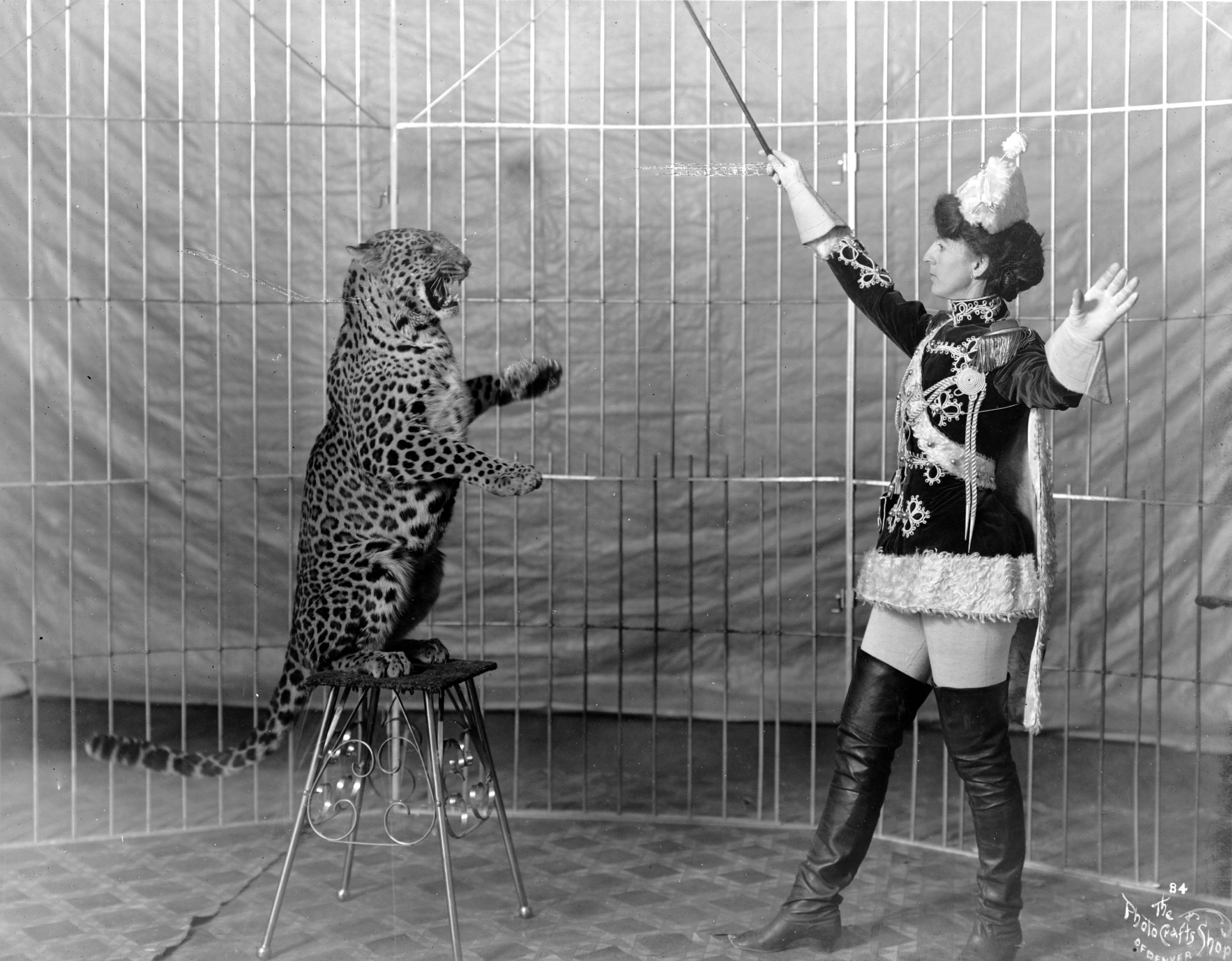
- Early 20th century animal trainer Dolores Vallecita with a leopard.

Occupation
- Names: Animal trainer
- Occupation type: Performing arts
- Activity sectors: Social science, busking, circus, show business

Description
- Competencies: Manual dexterity
- Education required: See professional requirements
- Fields of employment: Police, military, education, entertainment
- Related jobs: Lion tamer; see related occupations

Animal training is the act of teaching animals specific responses to specific conditions or stimuli. Training may be for purposes such as companionship, detection, protection, and entertainment. The type of training an animal receives will vary depending on the training method used, and the purpose for training the animal. For example, a seeing eye dog will be trained to achieve a different goal than a wild animal in a circus.

In some countries animal trainer certification bodies exist. They do not share consistent goals or requirements; they do not prevent someone from practicing as an animal trainer nor using the title. Similarly, the United States does not require animal trainers to have any specific certification. An animal trainer should consider the natural behaviors of the animal and aim to modify behaviors through a basic system of reward and punishment.

== Methods ==
=== The behavioral approach ===
==== Principles ====
During training, an animal trainer can administer one of four potential consequences for a given behavior:

Positive reinforcement
Occurs when an animal's behavior is followed by a stimulus that increases occurrences of the behavior in the future.
Negative reinforcement
Occurs when a behavior is followed by the removal of an aversive stimulus, which causes the occurrences of the behavior to increase in the future.
Positive punishment
Occurs when a behavior is followed by the addition of an aversive stimulus. This causes a decrease in occurrences of behavior in the future.
Negative punishment
Occurs when a behavior is followed by the removal of a stimulus. As a result, the occurrences of the behavior decrease in the future.

Behavior analysts emphasize the use of positive reinforcement for increasing desirable behaviors and negative punishment for decreasing undesirable behaviors. If punishment is going to be used to decrease an undesirable behavior, the animal must be able to receive positive reinforcement for an alternative behavior.

==== Establishing new behavior ====
Reinforcement should be provided according to a predetermined schedule. Such a schedule of reinforcement specifies whether all responses or only some are reinforced and includes the following:

Variable ratio
A reinforcer delivery occurs after a set number of responses, but that number varies around an average number.
Fixed ratio
A specific number of responses occur before a reinforcer is delivered.
Variable interval
The first response that is emitted after a set but variable amount of time has elapsed is reinforced.
Fixed interval
The first response that is emitted after a set time has elapsed is reinforced.

While continuous reinforcement in a fixed ratio schedule may be necessary for the initial learning stages, a variable ratio schedule is the most effective at maintaining behavior over long periods of time.

There are various methods animal trainers can use to prompt an animal to respond to a stimulus in a specific way. For example, shaping is a process by which successive approximations are rewarded until the desirable response topography is attained. An animal trainer can use conditioned reinforcers, like clickers, to bridge the interval between response and positive reinforcement. Some stimuli that is considered discriminative are signals, targets and cues. They can be used to prompt a response from an animal, and can be changed to other stimuli or faded in magnitude. In order to delay satiation, reinforcer size should be as small as possible and still be effective for reinforcement. Also, the timing of the delivery of a reinforcer is crucial. Initially the interval between response and consequence must be minimal in order for the animal to associate the consequence with the response.

Other important issues related to this method are:

- Stimulus control
- Motivating operations
- Desensitization
- Chaining
- S-deltas
- Discrimination
- Generalization

=== Other considerations ===
Sub-fields of animal training have different philosophies and styles. Dog training has different approaches, such as service dog training and show dog training. Similarly, bird training includes companion bird training and hunting bird training. Other subtypes of training include dressage horse training, Mahout elephant training, circus elephant training, zoo elephant training, zoo exotic animal training, and marine mammal training.

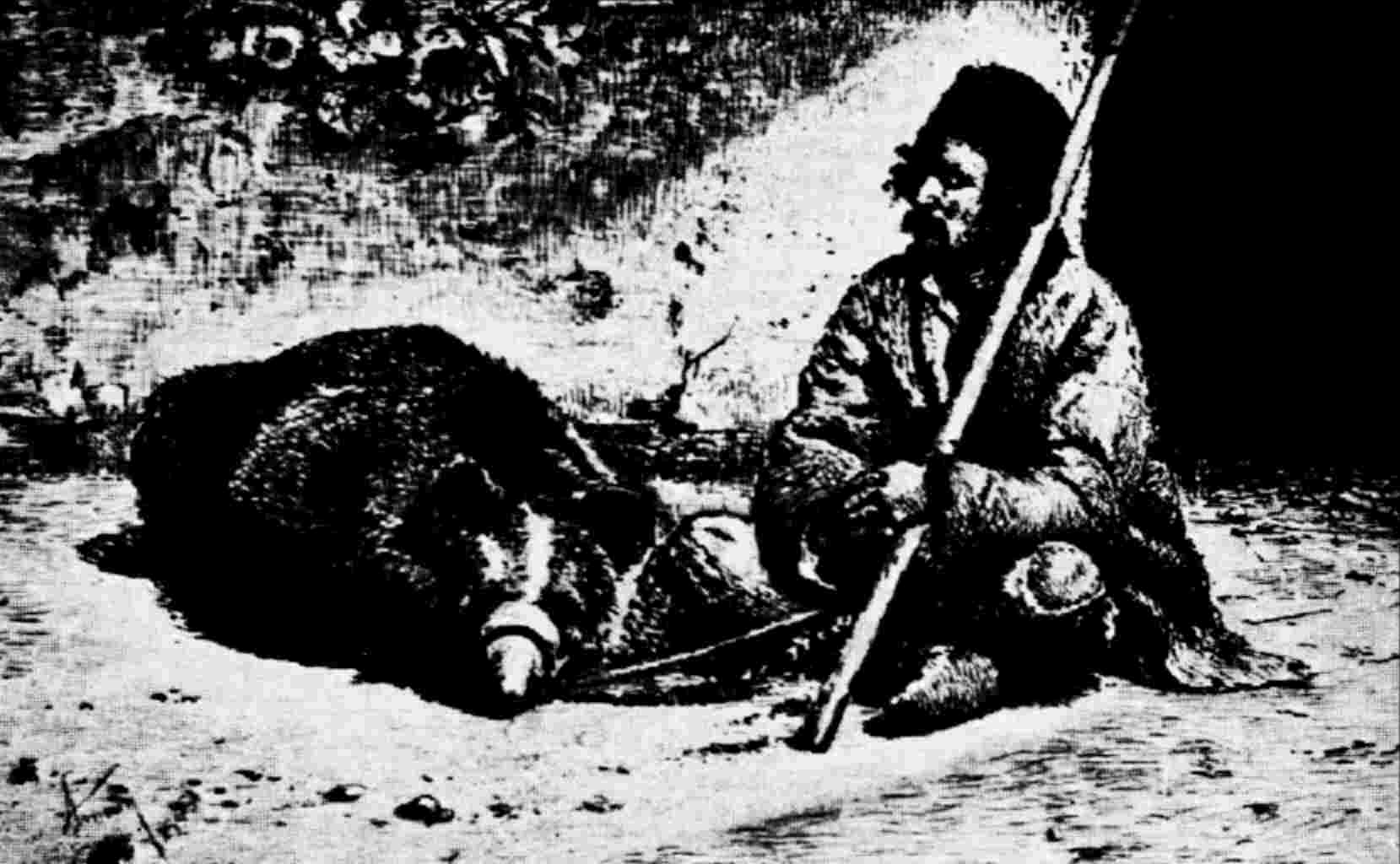
The Ursar by Theodor Aman, depicting a trainer with a muzzled bear

The degree of trainer protection from the animal and the tasks trained may also vary. They can range from entertainment, husbandry (veterinary) behaviors, physical labor or athleticism, habituation to averse stimuli, interaction (or non-interaction) with other humans, or even research (sensory, physiological, cognitive).

Training also may take into consideration the natural social tendencies of the animal species (or even breed), such as predilections for attention span, food-motivation, dominance hierarchies, aggression, or bonding to individuals (conspecifics as well as humans). Consideration must also be given to practical aspects on the human side such as the ratio of the number of trainers to each animal. In some circumstances one animal may have multiple trainers, in others, a trainer might attend simultaneously to many animals in a training session. Sometimes training is accomplished with a single trainer working individually with a single animal. In some species, the number of trainers is irrelevant, yet it can usually achieve the wanted outcome.

== Service animals ==
Service animals, such as assistance dogs, Capuchin monkeys and miniature horses, are trained to utilize their sensory and social skills to bond with a human and help that person to offset a disability in daily life. The use of service animals, especially dogs, is an ever-growing field, with a wide range of special adaptations. In the United States, selected inmates in prisons are used to train service dogs. In addition to adding to the short supply of service animals, such programs have produced benefits in improved socialization skills and behavior of inmates.

For hundreds of years elephants have been trained to work in activities such as logging and in warfare. Captive elephants can be trained to remember tone, melody, and recognise more than 20 words.

== Entertainment ==
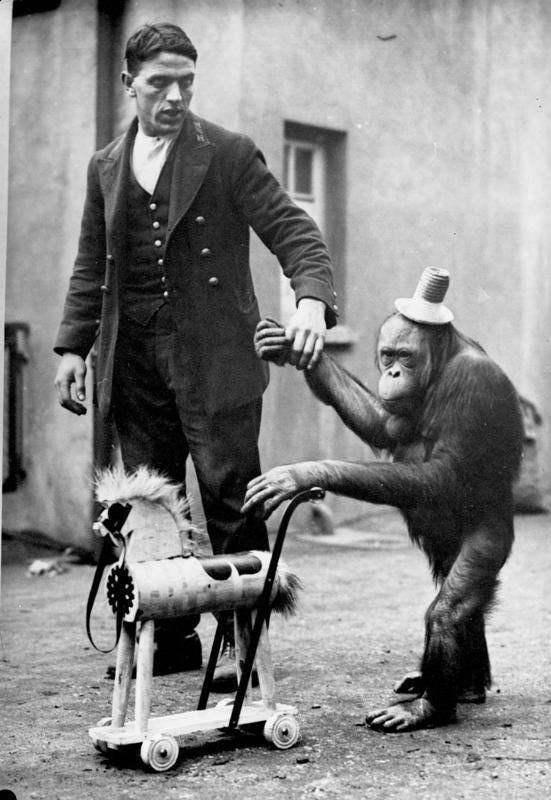
Morphy, an orangutan with his toy, a horse, on a walk with his keeper in a traveling circus.

Organizations such as the American Humane Society monitor the use of animals such as those used in the entertainment industry, but they do not monitor their training. It is best known for its end credit disclaimer "No Animals Were Harmed" that appears at the end of the credits of films and shows.

The Patsy Award (Picture Animal Top Star of the Year) was originated by the Hollywood office in 1939 after a horse was killed in an on-set accident during the filming of the Tyrone Power film Jesse James. The award now covers both film and television and is separated into four categories: canine, equine, wild and special.

One animal trainer, Frank Inn, received over 40 Patsy awards. While there is a high demand for mammals for film and television, there is also a demand for other animals. Steven R. Kutcher has filled this niche for insects.

== Companion animals ==
=== Dogs ===
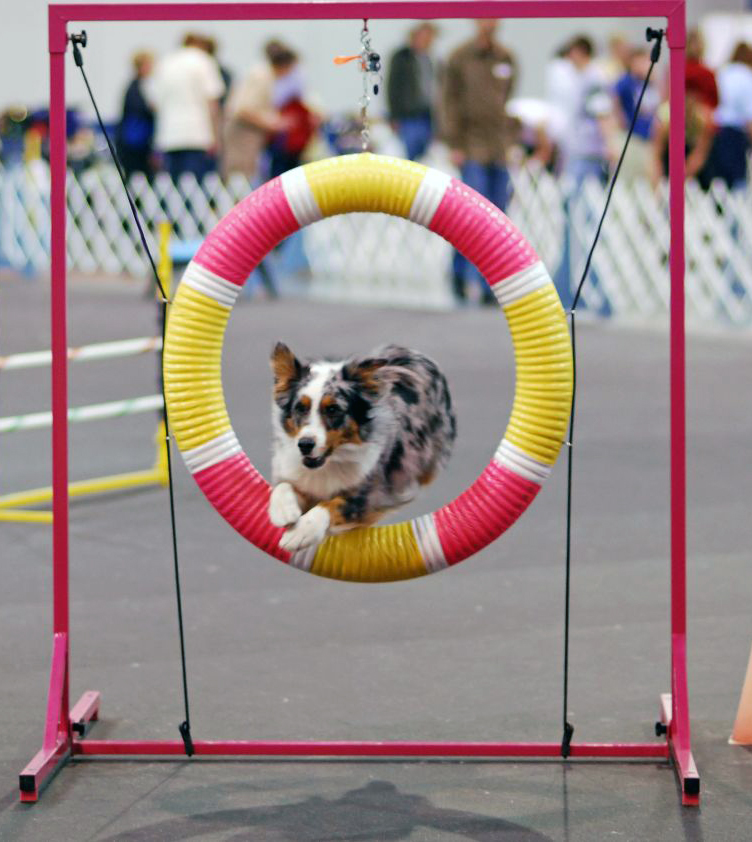
A trained dog competing in dog agility.

Basic obedience training tasks for dogs, include walking on a leash, attention, housebreaking, nonaggression, and socialization with humans or other pets. Dogs are also trained for many other activities, such as dog sports, service dogs, and working dog tasks.

Positive reinforcement for dogs can include primary reinforcers like food or social reinforcers, such as vocal ("good boy") or tactile (stroking) ones. Positive punishment, if used at all, can be physical, such as pulling on a leash or spanking. It may also be vocal, such as saying "bad dog". Bridges to positive reinforcement, include vocal cues, whistling, and dog whistles, as well as clickers used in clicker training, a method popularized by Karen Pryor. Negative reinforcement may also be used. Punishment is also a tool, including withholding of food or physical discipline.

=== Horses ===
The primary purpose of training horses is to socialize them around humans, teach them to behave in a manner that makes them safe for humans to handle, and, as adults to carry a rider under saddle or to be driven in order to pull a vehicle. As prey animals, much effort must be put into training horses to overcome its natural flight or fight instinct and accept handling that would not be natural for a wild animal, such as willingly going into a confined space, or having a predator (a human being) sit on its back. As training advances, some horses are prepared for competitive sports, up to the Olympic games, where horses are the only non-human animal athlete that is used at the Olympics. All equestrian disciplines from horse racing to draft horse showing require the horse to have specialized training.

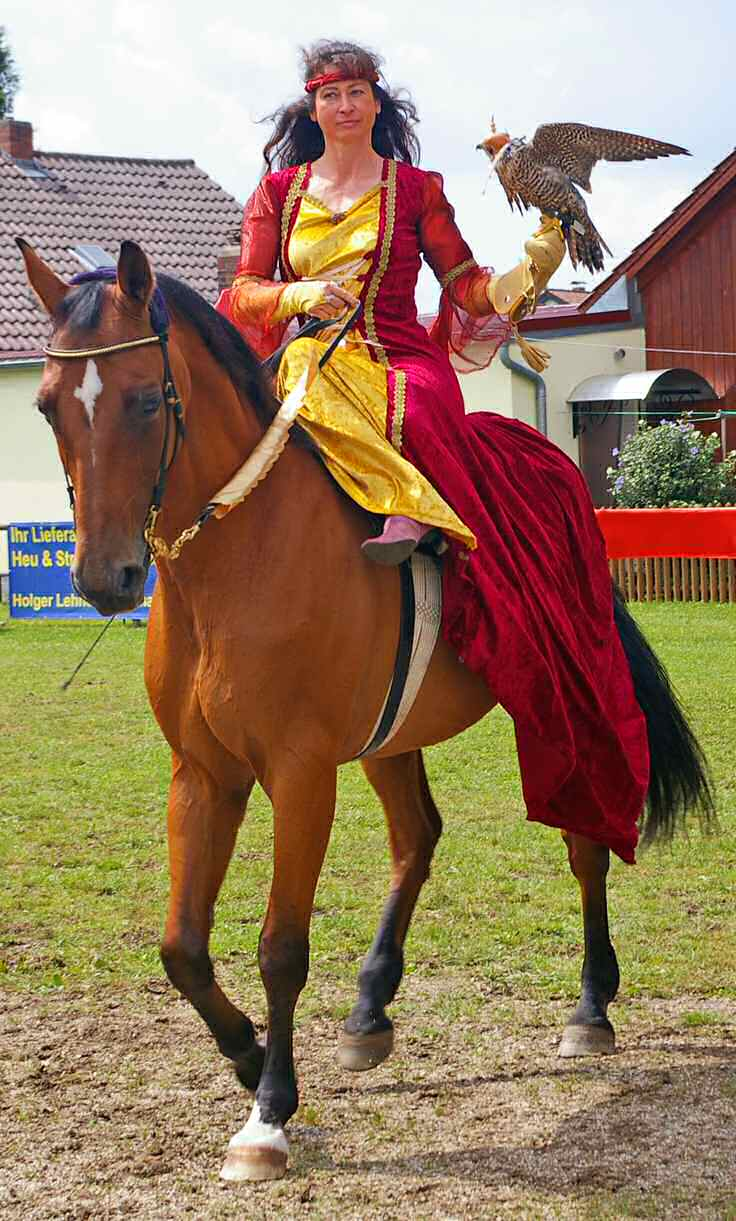
A human with a trained horse and a trained peregrine falcon

Unlike dogs, horses are not motivated as strongly by positive reinforcement rewards as they are motivated by other operant conditioning methods such as the release of pressure as a reward for the correct behavior, called negative reinforcement. Positive reinforcement techniques such as petting, kind words, rewarding of treats, and clicker training have some benefit, but not to the degree seen in dogs and other predator species. Punishment of horses is effective only to a very limited degree, usually a sharp command or brief physical punishment given within a few seconds of a disobedient act. Horses do not correlate punishment to a specific behavior unless it occurs immediately. They do, however, have a remarkably long memory, and once a task is learned, it will be retained for a very long time. For this reason, poor training or allowing bad habits to be learned can be very difficult to remedy at a later date.

=== Birds ===
Typical training tasks for companion birds include perching, non-aggression, halting feather-picking, controlling excessive vocalizations, socialization with household members and other pets, and socialization with strangers. The large parrot species frequently have lifespans that exceed that of their human owners, and they are closely bonded to their owners. Some birds of prey are trained to hunt, an ancient art known as falconry or hawking. In China the practice of training cormorants to catch fish has gone on for over 1,200 years.

==== Chickens ====
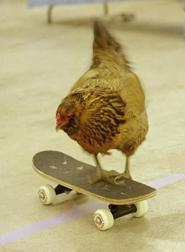
A chicken on a skateboard

Training chickens has become a way for trainers of other animals (primarily dogs) to perfect their training technique. Bob Bailey, formerly of Animal Behavior Enterprises and the IQ Zoo, teaches chicken training seminars where trainers teach poultry to discriminate between shapes, to navigate an obstacle course and to chain behaviors together. Chicken training is done using operant conditioning, using a clicker and chicken feed for reinforcement. The first chicken workshops were given by Keller and Marian Breland in 1947–1948 to a group of animal feed salesmen from General Mills, in Minneapolis, Minnesota. Trained chickens may be confined to a display (Bird Brain) where they play Tic-Tac-Toe against humans for a fee, invented by Bob Bailey and Grant Evans, of Animal Behavior Enterprises. The moves were chosen by computer and indicated to the chicken by a light invisible to the human player.

=== Fish and molluscs ===
Fish can also be trained. For example, goldfish may swim toward their owners and follow them as they walk through the room, but will not follow anyone else. The fish may swim up and down, signalling the owner to turn on its aquarium light when it is off, and it will skim the surface until its owner feeds it. Fish have also been taught to perform more complicated tasks, such as fetching rings, swimming through hoops and tubes, doing the limbo and pushing a miniature soccer ball into a net. Fish have been taught to distinguish and respond differently to slight differences in human faces displayed on a screen (archerfish) or styles of music (goldfish and koi).

Molluscs, with totally different brain designs, have been taught to distinguish and respond to geometric symbols (cuttlefish and octopus), and have been taught that food behind a clear barrier cannot be eaten (squid).

== Wild animals ==
=== Zoological parks ===
Animals in public display are sometimes trained for educational, entertainment, management, and husbandry behaviors. Educational behaviors may include species-typical behaviors under stimulus control such as vocalizations. Entertainment may include display behaviors to show the animal, or simply arbitrary behaviors. Management includes movement, such as following the trainer, entering crates, or moving from pen to pen, or tank-to-tank through gates. Husbandry behaviors facilitate veterinary care. It can include desensitization to various physical examinations or procedures, such as:

- Cleaning
- Nail clipping or stepping onto a scale voluntarily
- The collection of samples (e.g. biopsy, urine)

Such voluntary training is important for minimizing the frequency with which zoo collection animals must be anesthetized or physically restrained.

=== Marine mammal parks ===
Many marine mammals are trained for entertainment such as bottlenose dolphins, killer whales, belugas, sea lions, and others.

In a public display situation, the audience's attention is focused on the animal, rather than the trainer; therefore the discriminative stimulus is generally gestural (a hand sign) and sparse in nature. Unobtrusive dog whistles are used as bridges, and positive reinforcers are either primary (food) or tactile (rub downs), and not vocal. However, pinnipeds and mustelids (sea lions, seals, walruses, and otters) can hear in our frequency, so most of the time they will receive vocal reinforcers during shows and performances. The shows are turned into more of a play production because of this, instead of just a run through of behaviors like cetaceans generally do in their shows. Guests can often hear these vocal reinforcers when attending a SeaWorld show. During the Clyde and Seamore show, the trainers may say something like: "Good grief, Clyde!" or "Good job, Seamore". The trainers substitute the word "good" in the place of food or rubdowns when teaching a specific behavior to the animals so that the animals no longer need constant feeding as praise for achieving the appropriate behavior.

=== Field research ===
On an experimental basis, wildlife researchers have employed animal trainers in their interactions with animals in the field.

== List of notable animal trainers ==
Known for their influence on the circus:

- Sylvia Rideoutt Bishop (1920–2004), first female African American horse trainer.
- Dolores Vallecita (1877–1925), American vaudeville entertainer, and circus animal trainer.
- Hanno Coldam (1932–1992) Chief Animal Trainer with the State Circus of East Germany 1960–1990.
- Brothers Vladimir Durov (1863–1916) and Anatoly Durov (1887–1928) Russian circus animal trainers and founders of the Durov Animal Theater in Moscow.
- Carl Hagenbeck (1844–1913) a merchant of wild animals who introduced "natural" animal enclosures.
- Gunther Gebel-Williams (1934–2001) trained animals for the Ringling Bros. and Barnum & Bailey Circus.
- Martin Lacey, (born 1947), animal trainer, owner of the Great British Circus, trained most of the tigers used in the ESSO TV advertisements in the 1970s.
- Martin Lacey Jr., (born 1977), son of Martin, an animal trainer and performer with Circus Krone in Munich.

Known for scientific research:

- Ivan Pavlov (1849–1946) studied the psychology of animal training and described the phenomenon of classical conditioning.

Known for earliest commercial application of Skinner's operant conditioning:

- Keller and Marian Breland, Animal Behavior Enterprises

Known for work in television and film:

- Nell Shipman (1892–1970) a Canadian film maker in early Hollywood.
- Frank Inn (1916–2002) trained dogs used in the Benji series.
- Brothers Frank Weatherwax and Rudd Weatherwax trained the collie Pal, which portrayed the first Lassie.
- Ralph Helfer
- Richard (Ric) O'Barry trained dolphins for the original 1960s Flipper television series, now opposes dolphin captivity
- Boone Narr, one of the most celebrated Hollywood animal trainers.
- Sled Reynolds, trained for Benji the Hunted, Dances with Wolves and Rudyard Kipling's The Jungle Book

Other:

- Warren Eckstein, animal trainer, author and radio personality.
- Dr. Ian Dunbar, veterinarian, animal behaviorist, and dog trainer.
- Victoria Stilwell, dog trainer, author and television presenter.
- Steve Austin dog trainer (particularly detection dogs), and television personality.
- Brandon McMillan (animal trainer), movie animal trainer, author, executive producer and dog trainer featured in the CBS television series Lucky Dog.
- César Felipe Millán Favela, dog trainer known for his Emmy-nominated television series Dog Whisperer with Cesar Millan.
- Dave Salmoni, animal trainer, entertainer, and producer.
- Akbar the Great, third ruler of the Mughal Dynasty in India, reputedly kept thousands of hunting cheetahs during his reign and trained many himself.
- Dawn Brancheau, (1969–2010) a Shamu trainer at SeaWorld Orlando. The film Blackfish focuses on orcas in captivity and specifically Tilikum, an orca that has been involved in three deaths.

== See also ==
- Animals in sport
- Cat training
- Circus
- Falconry Raptors (birds of prey) trained to hunt or pursue game.
- Horse training
- Lion taming
- Mahout Elephant trainer
- Military animal
  - Military dolphin
- Obedience
- Show (animal)
- Animals in professional wrestling

Related to animal behavior, psychology and training:

- B. F. Skinner — Founder of Behaviorism
- Behaviorism — Psychological theory under which operant conditioning falls, the effects of external events (stimuli) on behavior.
- Cognitivism — Psychological theory antithetical to behaviorism, internal mental representations and operations affecting behavior.
- Ethology — Study of the natural behavior of animals.
- Operant conditioning — The development of discriminative stimuli (SDs)
- Reinforcement
- Shaping (psychology)
