= Marine mammal training =

Type of animal care

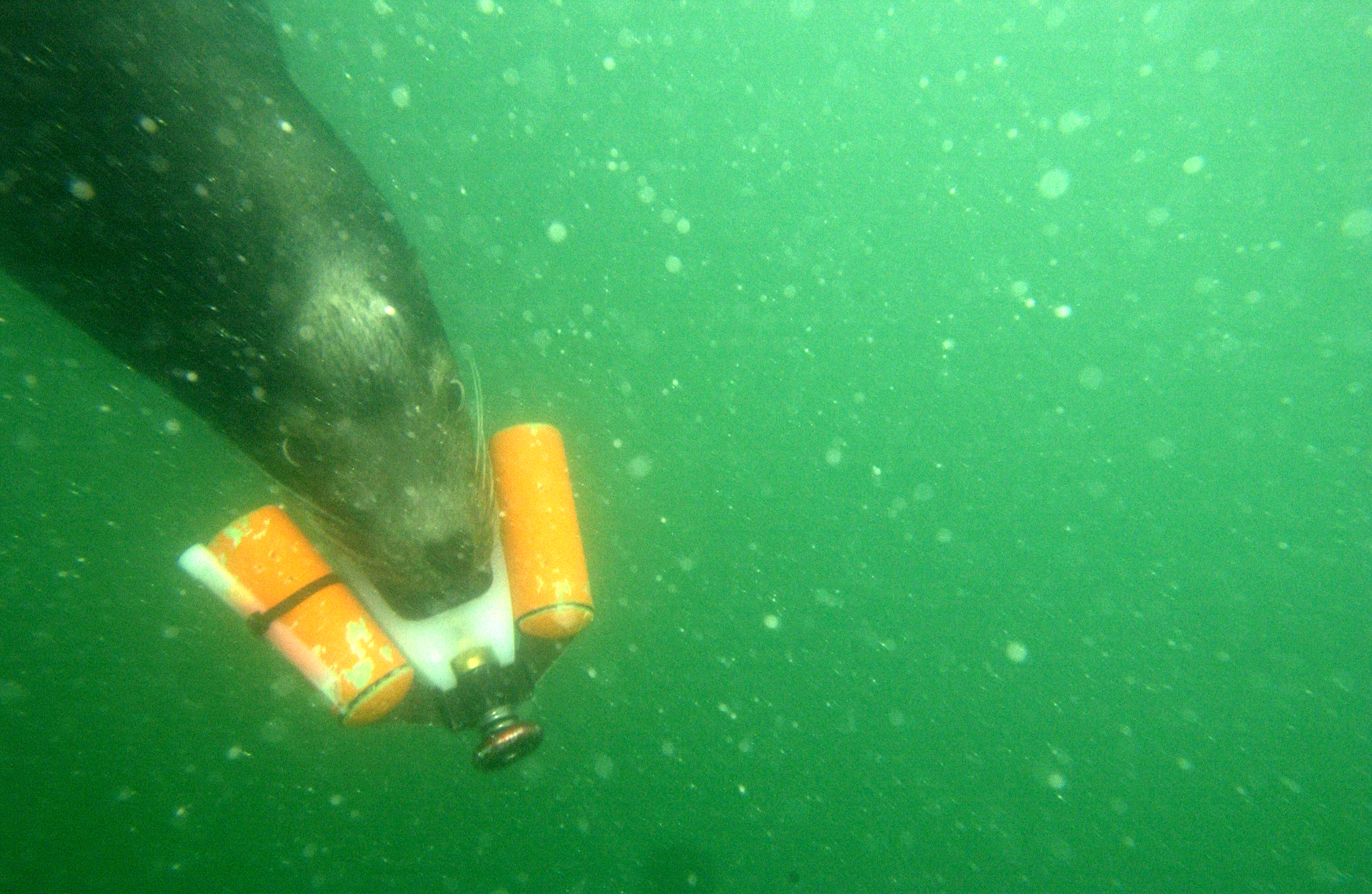
A California sea lion holds a training device during a US Navy harbor patrol swim.

Marine mammal training refers to the training and caretaking of various marine mammals, including dolphins, orcas (killer whales), sea lions, and walruses. This discipline involves teaching these animals behaviors for purposes such as performing in shows, scientific research, military operations, or health and enrichment. Caretaking elements include ensuring the animals' proper diet, habitat maintenance, and health monitoring.

== Methodology ==
Operant conditioning employs two kinds of reinforcement to instruct animals in performing behaviors: Primary reinforcement, which involves unconditioned rewards such as food, and secondary reinforcement, which includes learned rewards that teach reinforcing properties through their connection to primary reinforcers. Examples of secondary reinforcers include tactile interaction, such as petting or grooming from trainers, or engagement with enrichment tools, such as balls. The timeliness of reinforcement must be immediate for the animal to recognize the correct behavior. Trainers facilitate this through a bridging stimulus—a signal indicating the animal has performed the desired action correctly. Common forms of bridging stimuli include whistling sounds, usage of training clickers, or visual cues like hand gestures. These stimuli serve as a bridge between the behavior's execution and the receipt of a reward, enabling immediate feedback that enhances learning speed and focus, particularly when direct reinforcement is not feasible.

Shaping is a gradual method of teaching through successive steps, allowing the achievement of complex behaviors. Trainers use distinct signals to denote specific behaviors, guiding animals toward the desired response. In cases where an animal either fails to respond or exhibits an incorrect behavior, trainers employ a technique known as the Least Reinforcing Stimulus (LRS), wherein they pause for three seconds before attempting the signal again. It is similar to a "time-out". This approach emphasizes the avoidance of coercion and punishment, adhering to a philosophy of positive reinforcement and patience in animal training.

== History of Marine Mammal Training ==
Applied animal training employs many of the behavioral training techniques described by B.F. Skinner, who developed an experimental analysis of behavior through the use of rats and pigeons in operant chambers. During Skinner's pigeon project, he and a team of graduate students, including Marian and Keller Breland, trained pigeons to use screens to steer missiles to hit a target. However, this project was never operational. After this project, Skinner and the Breland couple were interested in potential applications of behavioral technology and operant principles. In 1944, the Brelands opened a business called Animal Behavior Enterprises (ABE) on a farm they purchased. They used operant conditioning techniques to train various animals for commercials, advertisements, and entertainment purposes. In 1950, the two opened a tourist attraction in Hot Springs, Arkansas known as the I.Q. Zoo. This zoo featured exhibits where trained animals would demonstrate many different behaviors, from dropping small balls into a hoop to hitting balls with bats on a miniature baseball field, and much more. In 1951, the Brelands wrote an article titled "A Field of Applied Animal Psychology", where they proposed that modern behavioral science and professional animal training be brought together through applied animal psychology. In the late 1950s into the early 1960s, they promoted and patented a dog and clicker training program called Master Mind.

Through the 1950s-1960s, the Brelands and ABE adapted operant methods to use with marine mammals and began a training program at Marine Studios. The program included training and developing new behaviors, staff training in operant methods, and prop design. When working with a dolphin named Splash, the Brelands were able to precisely shape and control behavior by using bridging stimuli. In 1955, the couple wrote the first operant training manual for dolphins, which included general principles such as stimulus, bridging, shaping, differentiation, extinction, props, and schedules of reinforcement. It also included individual act instructions such as descriptions of act goals, target behaviors, signaling instructions, specific training directions, and various potential educational or promotional uses for trained dolphins. ABE started the use of training logs to systematize and standardize training and to track the animals' progress. They scripted and created shows and taught others how to train using operant technology. Other marine parks that use operant training can be traced back to the ABE and the spread of behavioral technology, which helped the marine animal training industry to grow rapidly.

The world's first oceanarium, Marine Studios, was located in St. Augustine, Florida, and opened on June 23, 1938. This park was originally designed as an underwater movie studio, educational facility, and marine research center, but it became a popular tourist attraction. Park visitors could watch marine animals from an observation deck or through the clear walls of the saltwater pools. Atlantic bottlenose dolphins were featured in the first major dolphin attraction, named the Top Deck Show. Personnel used a form of shaping by requiring the dolphins to perform varying and increasingly higher jumps. Personnel would hold fish over the water and dolphins would leap into the air and take fish out of their hands or their mouth.

Marine Studios hired a former sea lion trainer from the Ringling Brothers and Barnum & Bailey Circus named Adolf Frohn to train the dolphins to play with inner tubes on command. Frohn had no previous experience working with dolphins. He worked with a two-year-old male dolphin named Flippy beginning in September 1949. Frohn first worked to familiarize Flippy with his presence and grow comfortable accepting handfed food. The trainer did so by rowing a small boat around the lagoon to stay near the young dolphin. Flippy learned six tricks: honking a bulb horn, ringing a bell, raising a flag, retrieving and catching a ball, pulling a surfboard ridden by a woman or dog, and jumping through a hoop. Marine Studios announced the world's first trained dolphin to the public in February 1951. Frohn kept his training methods secretive, intentionally not keeping training records, method instructions, or allowing assistants to participate in training. He used positive reinforcement and believed in the importance of a trusting, patient, and affectionate relationship between a trainer and an animal.

The rising popularity of marine mammal attractions led to the creation of additional parks such as Sea Life Park Hawaii and SeaWorld. Sea Life Park was opened in 1963 and was founded by Taylor Allderdice Pryor and her first husband. Pryor used Ronald Turner's operant training manual for dolphins and was able to train dolphins and teach training staff about operant conditioning. These methods were applied to training Spinner, Kiko, and Pacific bottlenose dolphins. Pryor's writings about her experiences played a major role in the spread of the use of operant psychology in animal training. SeaWorld was founded by George Millay, Ken Norris, and other investors. In 1964, Millay hired Kent Burgess, who was from ABE, to be SeaWorld's Director of Animal Training. Burgess used his experience from Marineland of the Pacific and Marine Studios to apply behavioral training in a structured system that included behavioral record-keeping, manuals, and courses that train in behavioral psychology. Burgess used operant psychology to train a killer whale named Shamu. After two months of training, Shamu performed in shows for the public regularly. These shows included behaviors such as opening her mouth to have her teeth brushed and examined, showing her fluke reflexes, having her heart checked, kissing her doctor on the cheek, and jumping to a target 15 feet in the air. The training program that Burgess implemented was valid, reliable, and efficient in all animal acts. The animal's behavior was the focus at Sea World through the use of operant psychology instead of the trainer's skill.

== Schooling for Marine Mammal Training ==
University of Alaska Fairbanks, University of California Santa Cruz, California State University, Cornell University, University of Delaware, Duke University, University of Hawaii at Manoa, and University of Maine are a few universities that offer schooling for marine mammal training. Most of these schools provide a schooling program with field experiences integrated with classroom and laboratory courses. While a bachelor's degree is not mandatory for this career, it is more beneficial to have at least a 4-year degree.

Most marine mammal trainers earn their degrees in marine biology, psychology, and/or animal behavior (ethology). Though formal education is very important, it is often better to learn and become familiar with marine mammal behaviors through first-hand experience, under the guidance of an experienced trainer.

== International Marine Animal Trainers' Association ==
The International Marine Animal Trainers' Association (IMATA), established in 1972, is an organization dedicated to fostering communication, professionalism, and cooperation among individuals engaged in the service of marine life. Its mission encompasses the exchange of information and expertise related to the care, training, and conservation of marine animals, with a strong emphasis on ethical practices and the enhancement of animal welfare.
