= List of people from Charles Town, West Virginia =

This is a list of people who were born in, lived in, or are closely associated with the city of Charles Town, West Virginia.

== Athletics ==
- Sylvia Rideoutt Bishop, first female African American horse trainer
- Gary Gregor, NBA player
- James Jett, NFL player

== Arts and entertainment ==
- John Peale Bishop, author
- Jack W. Germond, political reporter and commentator
- Frank R. Stockton, author, most famous for the short story "The Lady, or the Tiger?"
- David Hunter Strother, artist, author, soldier, statesman (Consul General to Mexico City)

== Education, politics and service ==
- John Brown, tried and hanged in Charles Town
- Sammi Brown, former member of the West Virginia House of Delegates
- Frank Buckles, longest-surviving American veteran of World War I
- Martin Delany, abolitionist, physician, leader in the Black Nationalism movement
- Warren B. English, politician
- Darryl Fitzwater, Anglican bishop
- Hamilton Hatter, founder of Bluefield Colored Institute
- John H. Hill, former slave, president of West Virginia State University
- Samuel Mason, Revolutionary War soldier and early American outlaw
- Frederick Mayer, German-born Jewish agent of the OSS during World War II
- William McSherry, Jesuit and president of Georgetown University
- Edward Tiffin, first governor of Ohio
- Samuel Washington, George Washington's brother, lived in Charles Town at Harewood
- William Lyne Wilson, Postmaster General of the United States
- Thomas Worthington, sixth governor of Ohio and one of the first senators from Ohio
