= Luna Park, Scranton =

Former amusement park in Scranton, Pennsylvania

Coordinates: 41.399°N 75.639°W

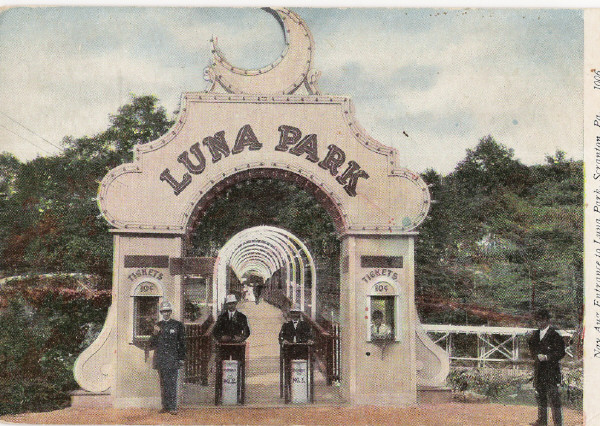
Postcard picture of the west entrance of the park

Luna Park was an amusement park in Scranton, Pennsylvania, that operated from 1906 to 1916. It was initially designed, built, and operated by two companies affiliated with Frederick Ingersoll. It occupied a 20-acre plot of land on Moosic Mountain along the eastern side of Roaring Brook gorge, opposite present-day Nay Aug Park.

A logo developed in 1906

== Inception ==
Scranton's Luna Park was named after the park of the same name located on Coney Island in New York. Frederick Ingersoll had opened several other parks of the same name prior to Scranton's Luna Park. Ingersoll sought regional investors in advertisements in trade publications such as The Billboard.

Newspaper articles from Scranton Republican and The Scranton Truth suggest the decision to build the park was based on increasing levels of public interest in amusement parks beginning as early as July 17, 1900.

Local financiers suggesting the public's increasing interest was income that could otherwise be earned locally. Reasonable estimates of anticipated income and profitability provided investors with the justification to approve Ingersoll's announcement of Luna Park, Scranton in the fall of 1905. Ingersoll Construction Company, with funding of $300,000, began the design and construction of the park on November 14, 1905. The park opened to the public on May 28, 1906.

== Design and construction ==
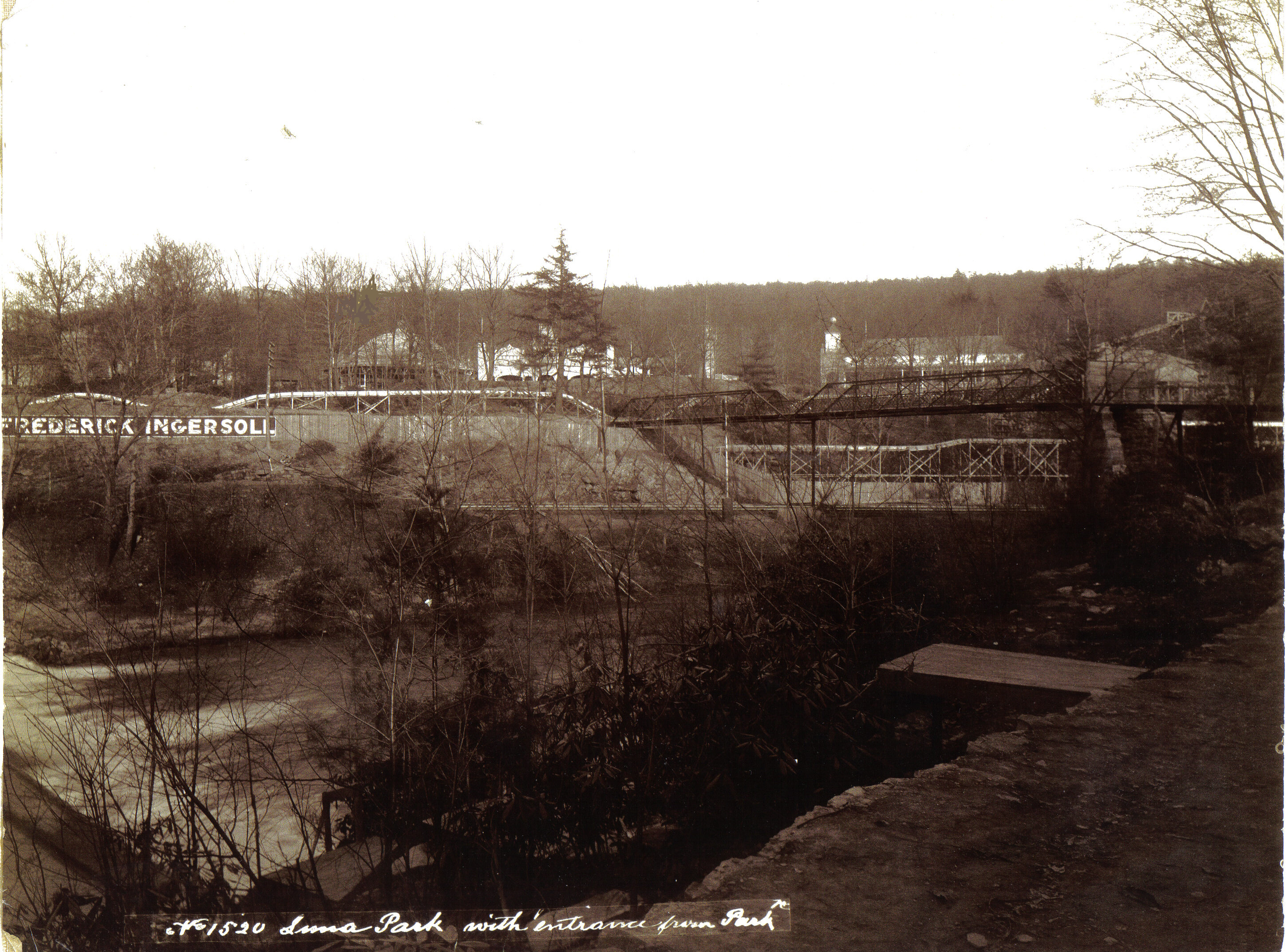
C.1906 photo by W.B. Bunnell of Luna Park, encompassing all of the second section of the park.

Ingersoll described the park as being "of three parts". The first section dammed Roaring Brook to form a small lake for boating and aquatic sports. The second section centered around amusement rides, and featured many different rides over the years. Some of these rides include Folks Shoot-the-Chutes, a pool known as "The Lagoon", the Scenic Railway roller coaster, H.G. Traver's Aerial Circle Swing, Scenic River/Old Mill, Blarney Castle, Shades and Shadows, E. Conley's Shooting Gallery, a Steele MacKaye Scenitorium, Temple of Mystery, Edisonia, Trip to Rockaway, a dance pavilion, J.D. William's Restaurant, a 3-tier Dentzel carousel, Williams Ice Cream/Soda Fountain, a band stand, and a circus platform (later called "The Hippodrome"). The third section was the picnic grounds, with a large picnic pavilion. Other significant attractions were added to the park over time, from the Hale's Tours of the World train ride, to the more simplistic Mahoney's Pony Rides. Live vaudeville acts, exhibitions, circus, and orchestra performances were scheduled as free entertainment complementing patrons' visits. Two of the most successful appearances at the park were that of the Knabenshue Toledo No. 2 airship, flown by aviator Lincoln Beachey, and a leopard act by Dolores Vallecita.

Scranton's Luna Park was serviced by rail facilities, making it a trolley park. The park had record attendance in its first years, facilitated primarily by the Lackawanna & Wyoming Valley Railroad and Scranton Railway Company trolleys. Not until several years later were two automobile parking lots added.

== Financial concerns ==
June 1908 newspaper photo showing several new exhibits on the boardwalk.

The biggest disadvantage to park planning was that two large lots upon which they were sited were leased with ballooning rental payments over time. This proved consequential as effects of the Panic of 1907 wracked the U.S. economy. Ingersoll publicly spoke of expanding the park after its first year of operation, but was forced to regroup funds. He sold his stock holdings in the park to the board of the Scranton Luna Park Company and resigned his position as the park's vice-president. As the recession took hold of the economy, outings, picnics, and excursions no longer were reserved by church groups, social organizations, and businesses as they had been before. Despite the decline in attendance, the board of directors moved forward with major expansion, adding a number of buildings and remodeling several already-existing buildings. Consequently, these actions initiated debt as ticket sales did not cover operating expenses, lease payments, and the added cost of expansion.

Rather than default on lease payments, the board of directors decided to accept new members, local capitalists that could not only pay off construction debt, but acquire land outright. The principal investor was Adolph Blau, who maintained a series of local businesses, including a private bank. Blau received a majority of stock and became president of the park company for several years. Surprisingly, despite the failing economy and debt scare, the board of directors invested in additional attractions prior to opening for the 1909 season – an arcade, the Billiken's Temple funhouse, an alligator zoo, a glass blowing exhibit, a miniature railroad, and upgrades to previously existing attractions. During this season, competition from other area parks began to draw park patrons away.

Continuous and reliable revenue remained a problem. Attendance was highly variable and unable to be forecast with certainty. Throughout the next four years, management observed large crowds on weekends, holidays, and special occasions such as company picnics, but sparse during an average weekday.

== Decline of Luna Park ==
One issue the park faced was obtaining quality vaudeville acts, despite membership in the National Amusement Park Association. To counter this, the park erected an outdoor "moving picture" screen and displayed first-run films, many of which were untitled "dailies" from movie companies out of New York. Another idea planned, drawing inspiration from P. T. Barnum, was to establish a full-scale circus staged in a vacant field within park boundaries. This was cancelled due to expenses. In an exhibition, aviator Lester Weeks accidentally crashed a biplane into the park.

There was a notable drop-off of group outings and picnics to Scranton's Luna Park at end of the 1911 season. A large labor union decided to charter its Labor Day festivities at the park, providing enough revenue to open the park the next season. Luna Park often ran promotions and held dance events in attempts to draw patrons to the park, as its higher ticket prices compared to other entertainment venues in the area affected it.

In April 1913, a film was shot in Luna Park by park manager J.E. Monroe and the Cities and Towns Film Company. Starring Maclyn Arbuckle in a variation of The Round Up, it portrays a scene in which a threatening brush fire is extinguished by the fire department. The park received minimal royalties from screenings of the film.

Commonplace accidents in the amusement industry sparked changes in laws in 1914 to enhance safety on rides. The board of directors made efforts to enhance safety "to make doubly sure it is nigh impossible for anything to go wrong at the park".

Expenses to enhance safety forced management to double-down on recruitment of private excursions, picnics, and outings, which was met with success. Management also decided to open the park on Sundays. An outraged Reverend Anderson successfully led a boycott of the park, forcing its Sunday closures to be reinstated. Many religious groups canceled their excursions at the park, and its revenue dropped significantly.

Actor Charlie Chaplin visited the park on June 7, 1915, and a "small riot" of crowds hoping to glimpse the famous actor was described by local newspapers.

Financial collapse of the park began on June 11, 1915, with the failure of the Blau Bank House. Blau's bank allegedly held significant cash deposits for the park which were then lost. He controlled 1,393 shares of park stock that would sell below value during bank bankruptcy proceedings, and more significantly, held a promissory note using Luna Park as collateral for payment on land purchased years earlier. In an effort to regain depositor assets, bankruptcy attorneys reviewed outstanding debts owed to the bank and discovered note 334 assigned to Luna Park. Nearing the end of the season with lost funding was a difficult situation for management in meeting obligations required on the note. They kept the park open as late as possible, until September 25, to generate sufficient revenue, but with consequences. Several large groups booked end-of-season outings, and an accident with injuries occurred on an overcrowded Scenic Railway coaster. In the final year of Scranton's Luna Park's operation, all expenses were cut drastically, including insurance.

== Fire and park closure ==
Section of the park destroyed by the August 1916 fire. Photo taken prior to the 1908 renovations.

Disaster struck irrecoverably when one third of the park was destroyed by fire in the early morning of August 23, 1916. A fire of unknown origin destroyed facilities critical to the production of revenue, including the dance pavilion, Scenic Railway's station, Shoot-the-Chutes, and railroad tracks of the Laurel Line Railroad. The eyewitness account of city patrolman John J. Horn, who discovered the fire, stated the fire's origin appeared to be the eastern side of the dance pavilion. This was the approximate location used for incineration of the park's waste paper and flammable material storage, and the previous location of at least one serious fire. However, there was speculation of an electrical origin, as well as one from dumped ashes of a steam locomotive. The fire was "well-involved" when discovered, and windy conditions were prevalent. The fire jumped from one structure to the next, burned overnight until dawn, and could be seen for miles. Estimated damage was $15,000.

As the park was still burning, the board of directors convened an emergency meeting nearby. A large outing was scheduled to occupy the park in days, and looming debt action was required, so a decision was made to recreate the dance floor as quickly as possible. As the embers cooled in the morning, 150 workers began to clear the area of debris and pour a new concrete foundation for the dance floor.

By the end of the week, a roofless dance floor was completed, but emergency funds provided by individual board members were exhausted, leading to the decision not to rebuild the Scenic Railway roller coaster station, the Shoot-the-Chutes ride, or substantially repair any other damage. On the day of the large outing, August 26, 1916, very heavy rains fell. Attendance was limited as no one wished to pay to dance on an open platform under such conditions. Revenue was well below expectations.

Payments were due and the board of directors was unable to raise sufficient funds by the deadline. On January 5, 1917, exercising a confession of judgement clause of the Blau Bank House promissory note, the park was sold at public auction to a bankruptcy attorney, Ralph W. Rymer, representing a then-anonymous individual interested in the land. In early May 1917, local newspapers announced all amusement buildings would be razed. After demolition, the park's new owner, Peter Stipp, Sr., sold the land to the city of Scranton, which then quieted liens due on the promissory note through the confessed judgment clause.

On February 2, 1929, an attempt was made by A.H. Strohl to resurrect an amusement park on the site. This was rejected by the Scranton city council on the basis of weak financial planning and concerns of residents over noise.

== Today ==
Few park remnants are identifiable today: a dam, the circus platform, the area which once housed the alligator pit, the Shoot-the-Chutes lagoon edge, an access tunnel from Laurel Line roadbed, and scattered concrete footings. Much of the overgrown grounds were covered by the 1960 construction of Interstate 81, which intersects the former area of the park. More former park land was covered by a widening of the Central Scranton Expressway in 1998. Urban development encroached the northern side of the grounds of the former Luna Park.

== See also ==
- Luna Park
- Nay Aug Park
- Rocky Glen Park
