= The Amazing Acro-Cats =

Performance troupe of domestic cats

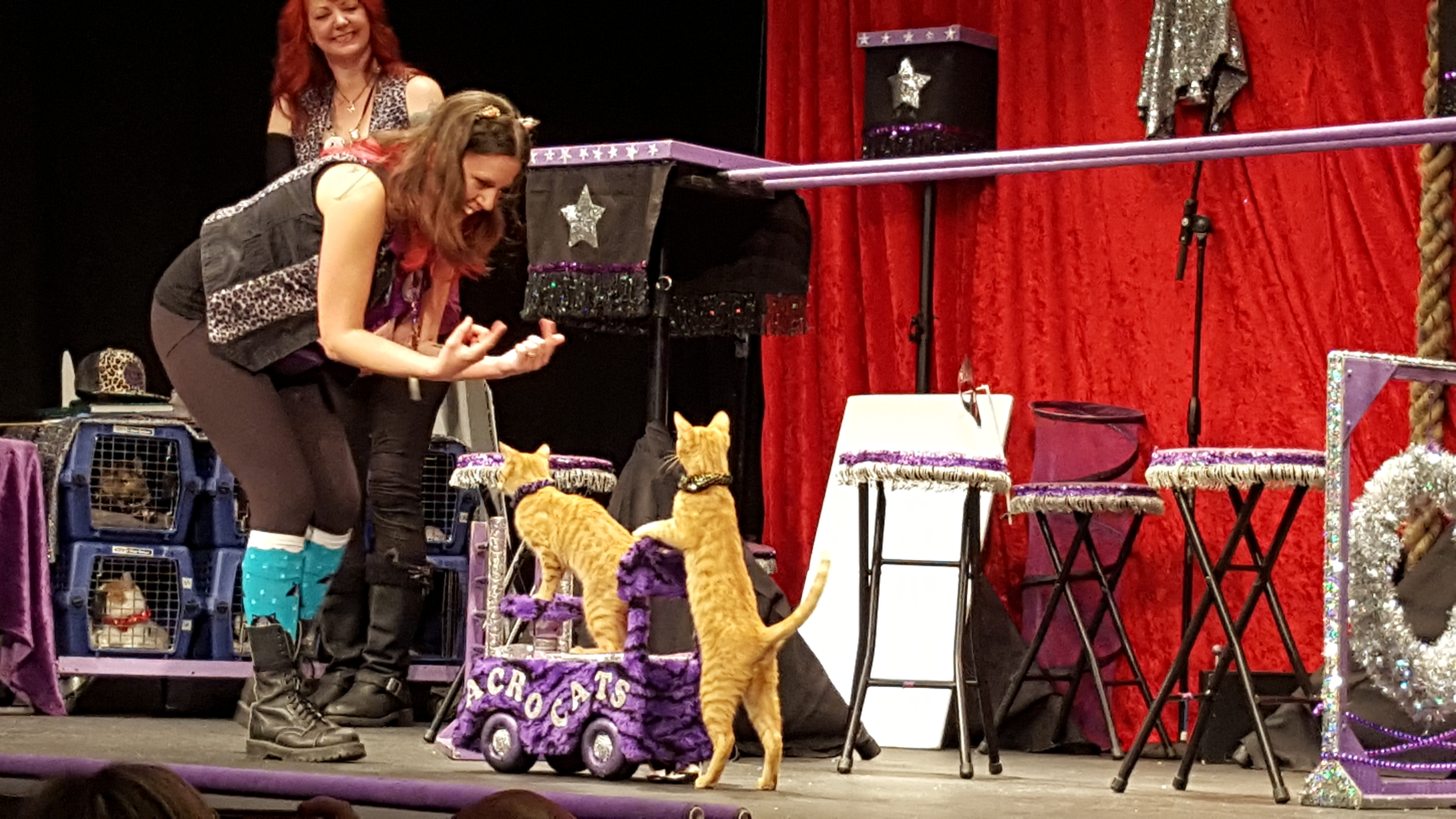
Two cats performing a cart pushing trick with the Amazing Acro-cat travelling cat circus

The Amazing Acro-cats is a circus troupe of domestic cats and a few other small animals, founded by animal trainer Samantha Martin in Chicago, Illinois. One of the featured acts is the musical band, the Rock-Cats. The troupe, based in Griffin, Georgia, tours the United States for much of the year.

== History ==
Founder Samantha Martin created the show in approximately 2005 as a way "to keep her show cats mentally sharp in between television, film, and advertising jobs." In 2009, the troupe began to tour the U.S. in an RV from its base in Chicago. In 2013, the troupe held its first show in Canada, in Toronto, Ontario.

In 2012, Martin started a Kickstarter fundraiser to replace the aging RV that had been used as the tour bus. A goal of the campaign was to upgrade the facility, providing "a lush, plush, safe, and stimulating environment for the cats; everything from built-in perches, posts, catwalks, and toys; and even a nursery for our foster kittens." Over $30,500 was raised from 567 contributors, which exceeded the campaign goal by over $2,500. A new bus was in place by February 2013. In late 2017, Martin and her troupe relocated from Chicago to their "Meowy Manor" in Griffin, Georgia. The troupe stayed home for most of 2018 while Martin was successfully treated for cancer, but was touring again by 2019.

== Use of clicker training ==
Martin uses clicker training to teach domestic cats and other animals to perform tricks. A treat is given at the sound of a click at the exact moment the cats are doing a desired behavior. "It's just more of a fine tuning way of training," Martin said. "It's noise and treats. It triggers something in their brain, and they get it very quickly."

Martin uses varieties of tuna and chicken to reward the cats. The results are not as consistent as might be achieved with more compliant animals such as dogs, but the "long-standing notion that cats are un-trainable is thrown completely out the window." During the one-hour show, the cats perform tricks such as "walking tightropes, pushing carts, skateboarding, jumping through hoops, ringing bells, balancing on balls and turning on lights." When the cats don't perform as planned, it adds an element of humour, an important part of the show.

== Promotion of cat welfare ==
Martin aims to improve the public perception of cats and to promote their welfare during her show. "We use our show as an entertaining demonstration of what cats are really capable of, as well as the healthy benefits of clicker training." Martin demonstrates the clicker training technique in the show, training a kitten or cat to learn some new tricks. She explains that training can build richer relationships between cats and their humans; can be life-saving in emergencies when cats are trained to go to their carrier at the sound of a whistle; and can prevent behavioral problems, while providing physical exercise and mental stimulation. "'We hope people are inspired to train their own cats,' Martin said. 'They enjoy the training. They want you to work with them.'" Clicker training kits are made available for purchase at shows and online.

The cats in the troupe are mainly former orphans, rescues and strays. Since about 2008, Martin has also fostered many homeless cats and kittens. She brings her fosters on tour, training them and featuring them in the show. Over the years, over 140 foster cats or kittens have been adopted to new homes as a result of these efforts. A portion of show proceeds is typically given to cat rescue organizations, and on occasion the show itself is a benefit to promote a rescue organization.

== The Rock-Cats ==
Each show closes with a performance by the Rock-Cats, billed as the "only cat band in existence". A review of a Seattle show in 2014 said "these cats are capable of anarchic musical compositions" that Martin likens to free jazz; "an unpredictable assortment of instrument clanging, and rarely does it sound like the cats are playing the same song, let alone an actual, fully realized piece of music." Nevertheless, the reviewer found that "white-haired diva" band leader Tuna "has the perfect demeanor for a rock star of any species." Another reviewer of the Seattle show said it was a "really, really fun way to spend an afternoon", and listened politely to the band while realizing that Oz was a better guitar player than she was.

A reviewer of a 2013 show in New Orleans was critical of the band's musicality, and complained that the advertised "seasonal carol selections such as 'A Cat in a Manger' and 'Catnip Roasting on an Open Fire' never materialized." A review of a Los Angeles show in 2012 stated that although the band was unlikely to win any Grammy Awards anytime soon, "what they lacked in technical skill, they certainly made up for in rock 'n' roll catitude".

=== Band members ===
As of 2014:

- Oz, a male green-eyed tabby domestic short-haired cat born in 2005, plays guitar.
- Nola, a female blue-eyed, mainly white domestic short-haired cat with grey siamese tabby markings, born in 2014, also plays guitar.
- Dakota, a female white haired Turkish Angora cat with a tiny black mohawk, born in 2005, is the main drummer.
- Fiji, a female white and grey Himalayan cat born in 2007, is a back-up drummer.
- Asti, a female golden-eyed tabby domestic short-haired cat born in 2010, is in training for drums.
- Nue, a female blue-eyed tabby domestic short-haired cat born in 2005, is on keyboards.
- Sookie, a female tortoiseshell domestic short-haired cat born in 2009, is on chimes.
- Cluck Norris, a chicken, plays cymbal and tambourine.
- Garfield, a groundhog, works a gong or cymbals.

=== Former band members ===
- Pinky, a female white domestic short-haired cat, was a "focussed, professional and very demanding" guitar player, who died of breast cancer in August 2012.
- Hendiana Jones, a chicken with a knack for peace-keeping, last appeared in 2012.
- Tuna, a female white domestic short-haired cat born in 2002, was the band leader and played a cowbell. Tuna died in January 2017 of cancer.

== Agile cats ==
The circus performances involve demonstrations of feline agility. In 2014, Alley, a calico domestic short-haired Acro-Cat, broke the Guinness World Record for the longest jump by a domestic cat at six feet or 182.88 cm.

== Actor cats ==
Martin maintains her long-standing business Samantha's Amazing Animals, where she showcases cats and other animals for hire in television, film and advertising jobs. Twenty-nine domestic cats and an African serval were listed for hire in 2014, each with their own profile.

Tuna starred as a killer cat in the award-winning 2004 short film Zeke. She also starred in a film Cat House and had a smaller role in the film Ophelia. On television, she competed in the Animal Planet program Pet Star, was featured in the Animal Planet program Animal Witness, has appeared in a Comedy Central pilot television program, and was the main cat in the television program Mama Said. Tuna had also worked in advertising since she was a six-week-old kitten.

Buggles, a female mainly black tabby domestic short-haired cat born in 2007, has appeared in the independent film South Dakota and an international film, God's Smile.

== See also ==
- Clicker training
- Cat training
