= Hanno Coldam =

- Born: Heinz Matloch; 25 October 1932; Berlin, Germany
- Died: 13 April 1992 (aged 59); Berlin, Germany
- Occupation: Animal trainer
- Spouse: Regina Marcella
- Children: Marcella

Hanno Coldam (real name Heinz Matloch: 25 October 1932 – 13 April 1992) was a circus animal trainer from East Germany. With his wife and daughter, he specialised in lions, tigers and black panthers.

Born in Berlin just three months before the dramatic regime change of 1933, after leaving school Heinz Matloch trained for work as a blacksmith, his father's trade. Instead of that, however, he went on to take a job in the props department at the Barlay Circus. Here, between 1950 and 1954, he worked taking care of animals with Gilbert Houcke. In 1954 he was appointed an animal trainer with the Aero Circus, which in 1960 merged with the Barlay Circus to form the State Circus of East Germany. Between 1960 and 1990 he was the chief animal trainer with the State Circus. His comedy act "Rasierlöwen" ("Lions shaving") became particularly well known, and was featured in 1966 by DEFA, the state-owned film company, in a film entitled Black Panthers.

Following German reunification in 1990, the State Circus was dissolved. Hanno Coldam died in 1992.

== Awards and honours ==
- National Prize of East Germany
