= Jonathan Philip Klein =

American dog training expert (1956-2016)

- Born: September 5, 1956
- Died: December 30, 2016 (aged 60)
- Citizenship: United States
- Education: Phillips Academy 1971-1973; Palisades grad. 1974
- Alma mater: U. Cal. Santa Barbara 1980 BA
- Occupation: Dog trainer
- Years active: 1988–2016
- Awards: Best Trainer by City Voter 2009-2014

Jonathan Philip Klein (1956–2016) was an American expert in dog training and behavior consultant based in Los Angeles.

Klein trained dogs for several decades. He began I Said Sit in 1988 as an in-home pet training service and later offered day-care and boarding for dogs; he expanded his service by networking to vets, groomers, pet stores and breeders. In 2016, his 5,000 square foot facility offered training, day-care for dogs, and both long and short term boarding. Klein trained more than 8,000 dogs during a period of 28 years. His I Said Sit service won numerous awards.

Klein advocated reward-based training. He did not believe in punishing the animals, but rather teaching wanted behaviors and rewarding them when they happened. Training should be based on "trust and cooperation" rather than fear or dominance or intimidation, according to Klein. He advocated that dogs and their owners should have a healthy "foundation of interaction" comparable to a supportive parent-child relationship. Dogs with separation anxiety or problems living alone can be helped by day-care, according to Klein. He advocated clicker training and hand signals as teaching methods. He liked to find out what things a dog wanted most, and then used that as a reward to encourage positive behavior; for example, in one instance, he found that a difficult Pomeranian valued her dog bed, and Klein used that as a reward. When a family has a new baby, he advocated a calm period of adjustment to get a dog and the baby used to each other, and continuing to give the pet the same attention as before.

Klein opposed surgical methods to remove or soften a dog's bark, sometimes known as debarking or devocalization. He saw debarking as a "quick fix" but which prevents a dog from communicating with humans or other animals, which can cause other long-term problems.

Klein attended Phillips Academy in Andover from 1971 to 1973, graduated from Palisades Charter High School in 1974, and earned a BA from the University of California at Santa Barbara in 1980. He was certified by the National Association of Dog Obedience Instructors, Inc, was a Certified Professional Dog Trainer - Knowledge Assessed (CPDT-KA) by the Certification Council for Professional Dog Trainers, and a Certified Dog Behavior Consultant by the International Association of Animal Behavior Consultants. He wrote a blog entitled thedogbehaviorexpert.com and served as a legal advisor and expert witness in dog behavior cases.
