= Cat training =

Modifying a cat's behavior

Cat training is the process of modifying a domestic cat's behavior for entertainment or companionship purposes. Training is commonly used to reduce unwanted or problematic behaviors in domestic cats, to enhance interactions between humans and pet cats, and to allow them to coexist comfortably. There are various methods for training cats which employ different balances between reward and punishment.

== House training ==
=== Litter box training ===
Cats may be easily trained to use a kitty litter box or tray, as this is natural behavior. Many cats and kittens will instinctively use a litter box without needing to be taught, because of their instincts to expel bodily waste in dirt or sand. Therefore, with a new kitten, owners usually need to simply show the kitten where the litter box is located, and how to get in and out. On occasion, some training is required to help a new cat adjust to a litter box, or to help an older cat that suddenly stops using the litter box.

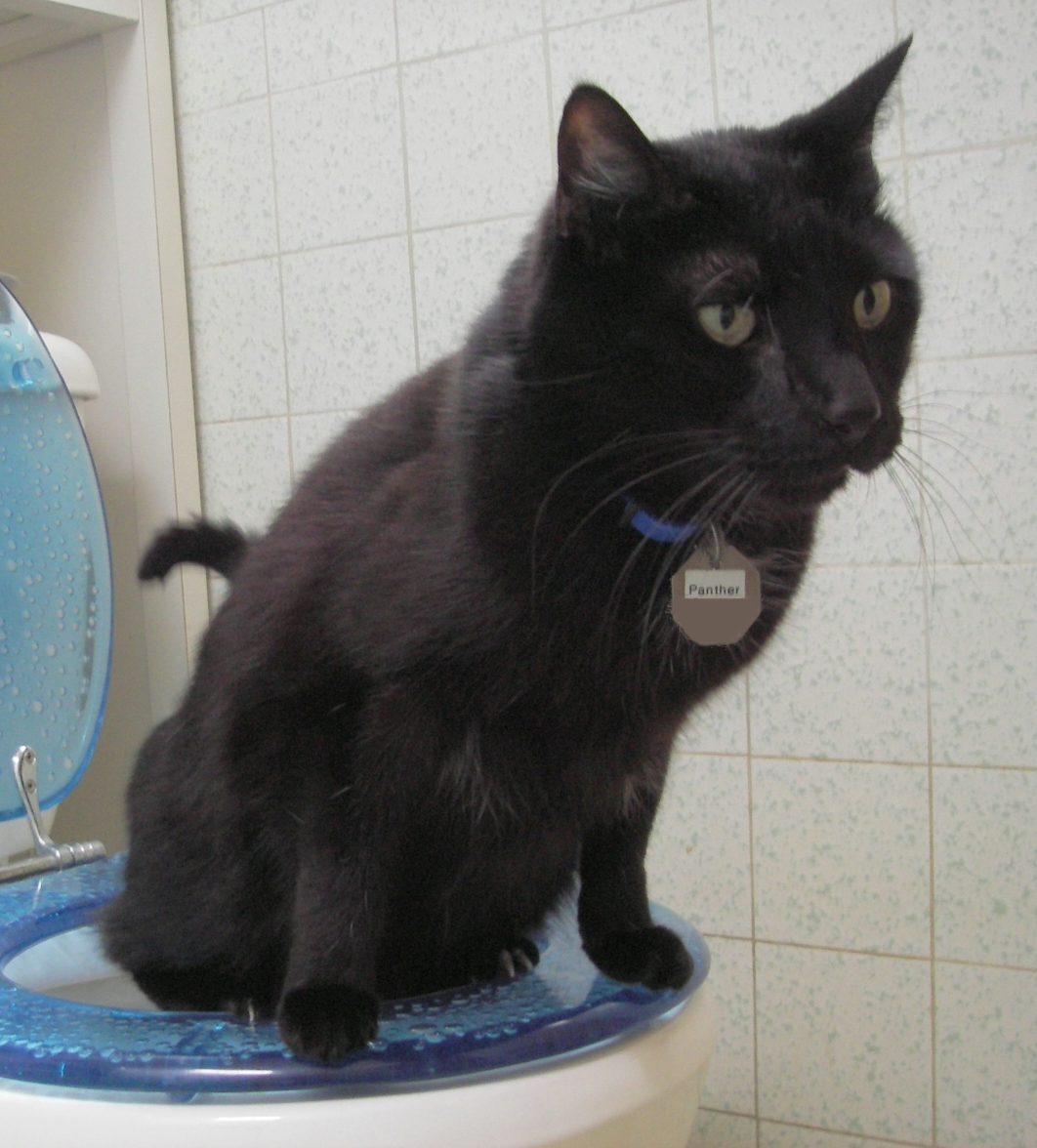
Toilet trained cat

Cats may also be trained to use a human toilet. The benefits of this method are that cat owners can eliminate the task of maintaining a clean litter box on a regular basis and avoid the smell that results when a litter box is not cleaned often enough. Some cat behaviorists advise against toilet training because it restricts the owner from monitoring changes in the cat's urine and feces (which are often related to the health of the pet). Another criticism is that toilet training can cause various stresses to the cat, partly because using the toilet goes against a cat's natural instinct to dig and cover its own feces, and because the toilet seat can be physically difficult for cats to straddle (especially those who are old or ill).

== Training methods ==
=== Positive reinforcement ===
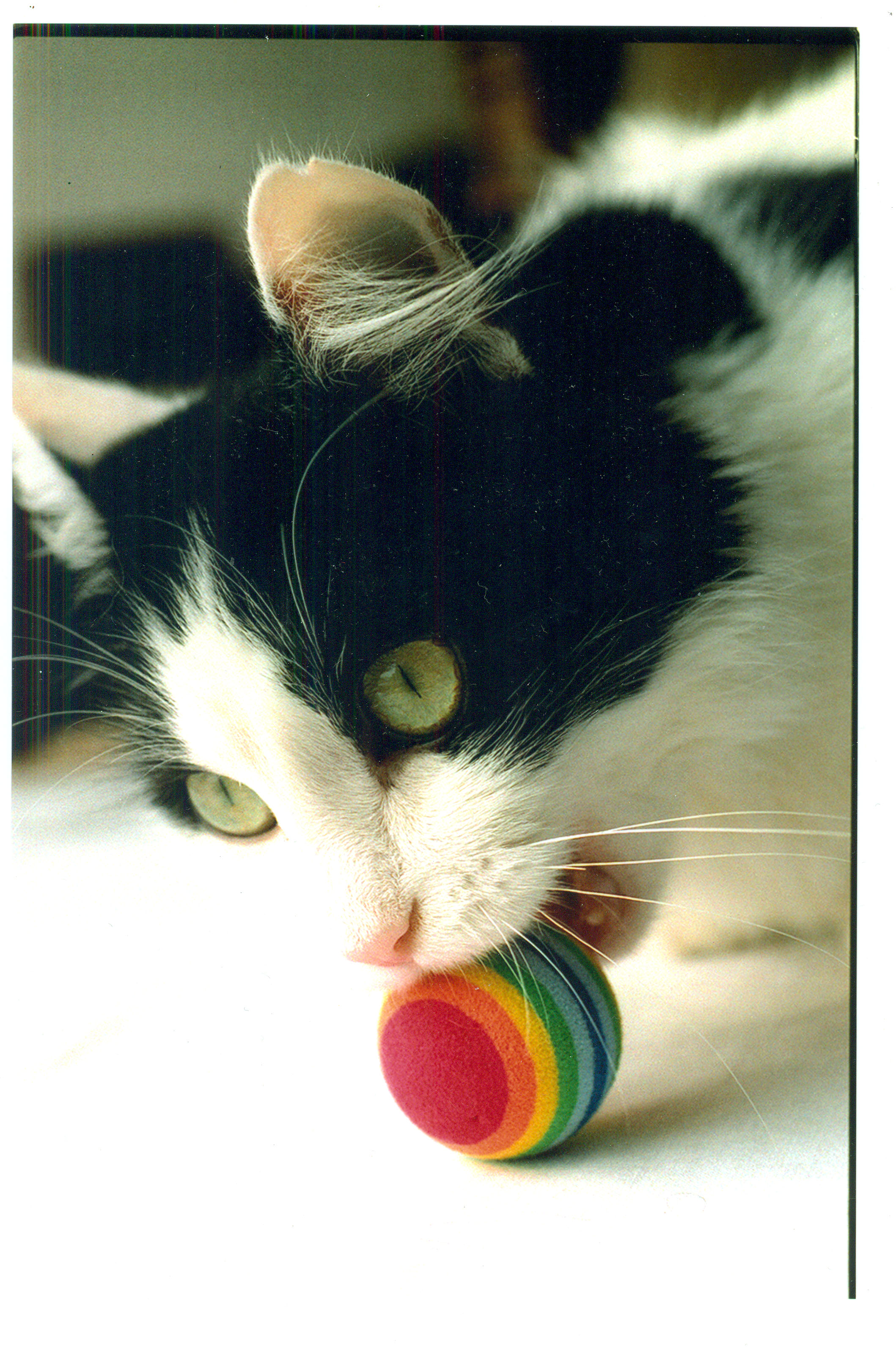
Black and white cat biting a multicolored ball

Training by punishment is not effective, as cats are likely to react with fear and stress, thus often resulting in behaviour problems. People sometimes unintentionally reinforce undesired behavior, like loud meowing or complaining for attention. Therefore, most trainers encourage cat owners to use positive reinforcement training only, rewarding the cat for desired or "good" behavior, and offering them alternative options or distractions (instead of punishment) for undesired behavior. Training a cat involves motivation, cooperation, time, and patience from the human.

=== Clicker training ===
Clicker training was developed by Keller Breland, Marian Breland Bailey, and Bob Bailey. The technique was initially used in the training of marine mammals, and later spread into the world of pet training (mainly dogs and cats, but it has been used with other animals as well). Clicker training uses a sound to signal to the animal that they have performed the correct, or desired, behavior. Trainers can utilize any item that makes a sound (e.g., a whistle, a beep, or a pen that clicks). Many people use a training tool called a clicker, a little plastic box with a metal tab that, when pressed quickly, makes the click sound. When clicker training a cat, the trainer clicks at the exact moment that the cat does the desired behavior and rewards with a treat immediately after the click. The cat will begin to associate the sound with the treat, and understand that the sound means they have done the right thing. Clicker training is popular in the cat training field because the clicker (or other sound) allows a trainer to tell the cat immediately when she has performed correctly, and makes it easier for the cat to identify exactly which action/behavior she is being rewarded for.

== Problem behaviors ==
A veterinarian can rule out possible medical causes for behavioral issues in cats. If medical causes are ruled out, cat behaviorists can help address problematic behaviors by retraining the cat and humans so that the cat's needs are met.

=== Scratching ===
Many cats scratch furniture like chairs and couches (even when scratching posts are provided for them in the home) because a cat's instinct is to scratch various objects, like trees, as a marker for other cats to see and smell. Trainers suggest guiding cats toward designated scratching objects that they will enjoy, changing the style or location of scratching posts around the house, and making scratching the furniture inconvenient. Some use positive reinforcement training, often accompanied by a clicker, to engage the cat in using the scratching post.

=== Spraying ===
Urine spraying is a problem usually found with intact male cats, but can also occur with females and neutered cats. Solutions for this issue include: keeping the litter box extremely clean, removing causes of stress from the cat's environment, providing separate food and litter boxes in a multiple cat household, and preventing outdoor cats from accessing the yard and area around the house. In cases where spraying persists, owners are recommended to seek veterinary help as this could be due to anxiety or physical health issues.

=== Meowing ===
Cats meow for various reasons, and some are naturally more vocal than others. This becomes a problem behavior when there is excessive meowing or yowling, especially at night. Positive reinforcement training, sometimes accompanied by a clicker, is commonly used in this case. This involves ignoring the cat when it is making noise, and rewarding with treats and affection when it is being quiet.

== Tricks ==
A cat may be trained to do tricks such as playing dead or ringing the doorbell. Because of the cat's flexibility and bone structure, they are able to twist and bend their bodies, and jump a fair distance from standing still. This talent can be turned into tricks involving jumping through hoops and off scratching posts. Cats are able to learn many types of commands, such as to come when called, sit, roll over, shake a paw, and jump.

== See also ==
- Cat behavior
- Cat behaviourists
- The Amazing Acro-Cats
