= Durov Animal Theater =

Circus theatre in Moscow, Russia

Coordinates: 55°46′45″N 37°37′15″E

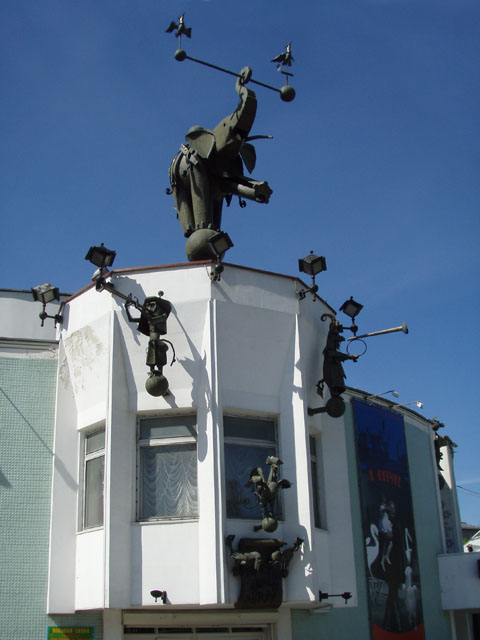
Durov's Animal Theatre building in Moscow

The Durov Animal Theater (Russian: Теа́тр звере́й имени В. Л. Дурова, romanized: Teátr zveréy imeni V. L. Durova) or Grandpa Durov's Corner (Russian: Уголок дедушки Дурова, romanized: Ugolok dedushki Durova) is a circus/theatre in Moscow, Russia. It was founded on January 8, 1912 by Vladimir Durov, who also founded the famous Durov's circus dynasty. Durov was a well-known animal trainer and zoologist who developed his own system of training, that did not involve any punishment of the animals. His theatre also included a natural history museum and a science laboratory.

The theatre building was designed in 1894 by the architect August Weber. The theatre is currently located in the same facility; the street had been renamed in Durov's honour in 1927.

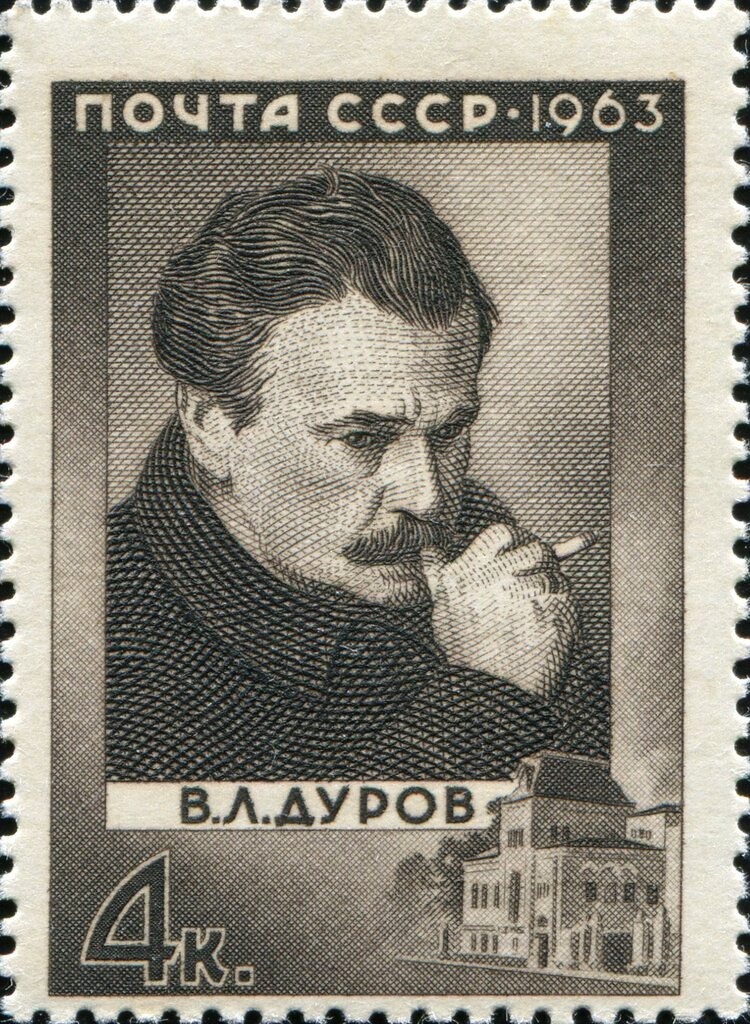
Postage stamp commemorating Vladimir Durov

== See also ==
- Anatoly Durov
