= Tap Pryor =

American marine biologist, businessman, and politician (born 1931)

Member of the Hawaii State Senate
- In office 1965–1966

Personal details
- Born: Taylor Allderdice Pryor; June 26, 1931 (age 95) New York City, U.S.
- Party: Democratic
- Spouse: Karen Wylie (m. 1954; div. 1975)
- Children: 3
- Education: Cornell University
- Occupation: Marine biologist, businessman, researcher

Taylor Allderdice "Tap" Pryor (born June 26, 1931) is an American marine biologist, researcher, businessman, and former politician in the state of Hawaii. He is the founder of Sea Life Park and Oceanic Foundation in Hawaii and was involved in various marine research ventures, including oceanography, aquanautics and aquaculture.

== Early life ==
Pryor was born in New York City on June 26, 1931, the son of Samuel F. Pryor and Mary Taylor Allderdice. His father was an aviator, and personal friend of Charles Lindbergh, who later served as vice president of Pan American World Airways, and his godfather was Al Williams, a pioneering aviator in the 1930s. He has two sisters and two brothers. Receiving the nickname "Tap" in his childhood, Pryor was from a wealthy family and grew up in Greenwich, Connecticut. He graduated from Cornell University in 1953 with a degree in creative writing and arts. Learning to fly at age fourteen, he also enlisted in the United States Marine Corps in the early 1950s, served at Parris Island, Pensacola, Florida, and Marine Corps Base Quantico as a helicopter pilot. In 1949 or 1951, he hitchhiked across Africa where he first encountered a coral reef in Zanzibar, which inspired him to "spend a lot of [his] life under water".

== Career ==
Pryor and his wife first came to Hawaii in 1955. Discharged from the Marine Corps at the rank of captain in 1957, he then decided to attend graduate school at the University of Hawaii to study biology where he worked as a research assistant under zoology professor Albert L. Tester. It was during this time which he was inspired to found a marine exhibit and research centre for the islands; he and his wife Karen founded the Sea Life Park Hawaii at Makapuʻu Point in Oahu which opened in February 1964. He also founded the adjacent Oceanic Foundation, which mainly focused on the study of oceanography. He served as Democratic member of the Hawaii State Senate from 1965 to 1966. Pryor also was appointed by President Lyndon B. Johnson to serve on the Stratton Commission on Marine Science, Engineering and Resources in 1967, which established the National Oceanic and Atmospheric Administration (NOAA).

In the 1970s, he entered the field of aquaculture by establishing the Kahuku Seafood Plantation at Oahu, where he devised farming methods to produce large quantities of oysters and prawns. It opened in 1981 at an abandoned World War II airstrip. The company went into bankruptcy in December 1982. In the 1980s, Pryor served as a principal investigator on the Defense Advanced Research Project Agency (DARPA) and worked at the Duke University Marine Laboratory and University of Hawaii Eniwetok Marine Laboratory, and as Vice President-Research of Aquanautics Corporation. He also lived in the Cook Islands where he was deputy chief of staff to the prime minister and a government planner.

Pryor later moved to Brunswick, Maine, where he continued to remain active in aquaculture, helping to establish the state's first land-based recirculating aquaculture farm in 2012.

== Personal life ==
He married Karen Wylie, whom he met at Cornell, in 1954 and they had three children. They divorced in 1975.
