= Clicker training =

Animal training method

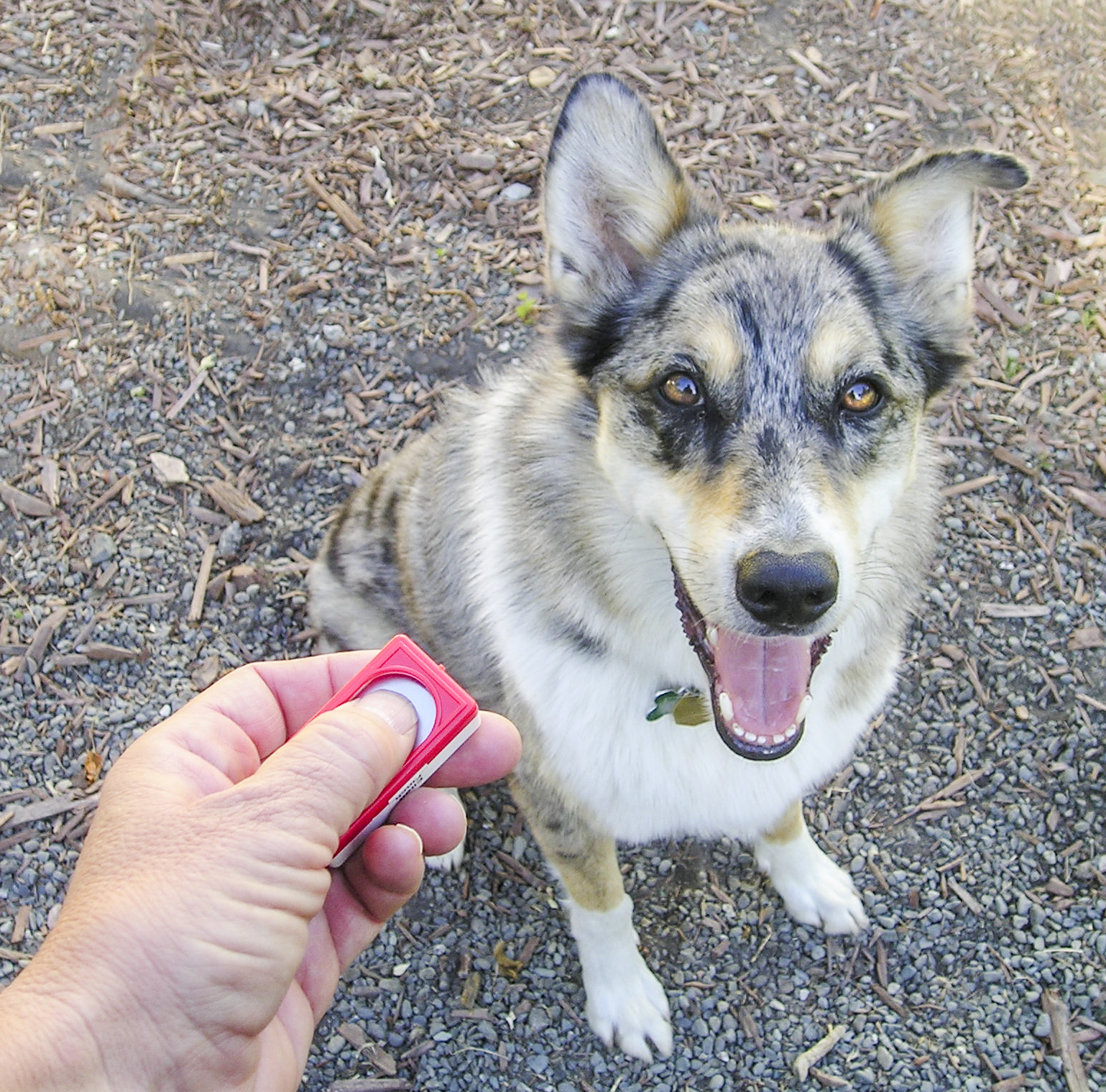
Clicker-training a dog.

Clicker training is a positive reinforcement animal training method based on a bridging stimulus (the clicker) in operant conditioning. The system uses conditioned reinforcers, which a trainer can deliver more quickly and more precisely than primary reinforcers such as food. The term "clicker" comes from a small metal cricket noisemaker adapted from a child's toy that the trainer uses to precisely mark the desired behavior. When training a new behavior, the clicker helps the animal to quickly identify the precise behavior that results in the treat. The technique is popular with dog trainers, but can be used for all kinds of domestic and wild animals.

Sometimes, instead of a click to mark the desired behavior, other distinctive sounds are made (such as a "whistle, a click of the tongue, a snap of the fingers, or even a word") or visual or other sensory cues (such as a flashlight, hand sign, or vibrating collar), especially helpful for deaf animals.

== History ==
B. F. Skinner first identified and described the principles of operant conditioning that are used in clicker training. Two students of Skinner's, Marian Kruse and Keller Breland, worked with him researching pigeon behavior and training projects during World War II, when pigeons were taught to "bowl" (push a ball with their beaks). They believed that traditional animal training was being needlessly hindered because methods of praise and reward then in use did not inform the animal of success with enough promptness and precision to create the required cognitive connections for speedy learning. They saw the potential for using the operation conditioning method in commercial animal training. The two later married and in 1947 created Animal Behavior Enterprises (ABE), "the first commercial animal training business to intentionally and systematically incorporate the principles of behavior analysis and operant conditioning into animal training."

The Brelands coined the term "bridging stimulus" in the 1940s to refer to the function of a secondary reinforcer such as a whistle or click. ABE continued operations until 1990, with the assistance of Bob Bailey after Keller Breland died in 1965. They report having trained over 15,000 animals and over 150 species during their time in operation. Their positive methods contrasted with traditional training using aversives such as choke chains, prong collars, leash snapping, ear pinching, "alpha-rolling", the shock collar, elephant goad, cattle prods, and elephant crushing.

Although the Brelands tried to promote clicker training for dogs in the 1940s and 1950s, and the method had been used successfully in zoos and marine mammal training, the method failed to catch on for dogs until the late 1980s and early 1990s. In 1992, animal trainers Karen Pryor and Gary Wilkes started giving clicker training seminars to dog owners. In 1998, Alexandra Kurland published "Clicker Training For Your Horse", which rejected horse training that uses aversives such as horsebreaking and the use of the spur, bit (horse), crop (implement), and longeing with a horsewhip. By the 1990s, many zoos used clicker training for animal husbandry because with this method, they did not have to use force or medication. They could be moved to different pens or given veterinary treatments with much less stress on the animals. In the 21st century, training books began to appear for other companion animals, such as cats, birds, and rabbits (See "Further Reading").

== Method ==
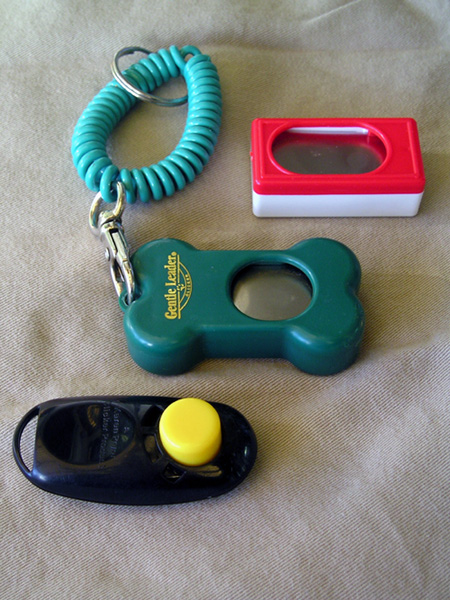
A selection of clickers

The first step in clicker training is teaching the animal to associate the clicker sound (or other chosen marker such as a whistle) with a treat. Every time the click sounds, a treat is offered immediately.

Next the click is used to signal that a desired behavior has happened. Some approaches are:

- capturing: catching the animal in the act of doing something that is desired, for example sitting or lying down. Eventually the animal learns to repeat the behavior for a treat.
- shaping: gradually building a new behavior by rewarding each small step toward it.
- luring: using the treat like a magnet to get the animal to move toward the desired position.

Once the behavior is learned, the final step is to add a cue for the behavior, such as a word or a hand signal. The animal will have learned that a treat is on the way after completing the desired behavior.

The basis of effective clicker training is precise timing to deliver the conditioned reinforcer at the same moment as the desired behaviour is offered. The clicker is used as a "bridge" between the marking of the behaviour and the rewarding with a primary reinforcer such as a treat or a toy. The behaviour can be elicited by "luring", where a hand gesture or a treat is used to coax the dog to sit, for example; or by "shaping", where increasingly closer approximations to the desired behaviour are reinforced; and by "capturing", where the dog's spontaneous offering of the behaviour is rewarded. Once a behaviour is learnt and is on cue (command), the clicker and the treats are faded out.

== Punishment or aversives ==
Clicker training teaches wanted behaviors by rewarding them when they happen, and not using punishments, according to dog trainer Jonathan Philip Klein.

Clicker training uses almost entirely positive reinforcements. Some clicker trainers use mild corrections such as a "non reward marker"; an "Uh-uh" or "Whoops" to let the dog know that the behaviour is not correct, or corrections such as a "Time out" where attention is removed from the dog. Alexander continues:

The meaning of 'purely positive' tends to vary according to who is using it. Some clicker trainers use it as a sort of marketing tool, perhaps to indicate that they eschew corrections and attempt to stick with positive reinforcement as much as possible ...

...[T]he term [purely positive] implies that clicker trainers use no aversives. Extinction [i.e. ignoring a behavior and not providing a reward] and negative punishment are both used by clicker trainers, and BOTH are aversive. Extinction is every bit as aversive as punishment, sometimes even more so. All aversives are not created equal. Some are mild and some are severe.

Some [trainers] use NRMs [Non Reward Markers]; some don't. Some say 'No' or make 'buzzer' sounds; some don't. Some use mild physical punishers like sprays of water or citronella or noise-related booby traps; some don't. Some use negative reinforcement in various fashions; some don't. Some use some of the above in real life but not in training.

Some credit trainer Gary Wilkes with introducing clicker training for dogs to the general public, but behavioral psychologist Karen Pryor was the first to spread the idea with her articles, books (including Don't Shoot the Dog) and seminars. Wilkes joined Pryor early on before going solo. Wilkes writes that "No method of training is 'all positive.' By scientific definition, the removal of a desired reward is a 'negative punishment.' So, if you ever withhold a treat or use a time-out, by definition, you are a 'negative' trainer who uses 'punishment.'" where "negative" indicates that something has been removed and "punishment" merely indicates there has been a reduction in the behavior (unlike the common use of these terms).

== See also ==
- Cat training
- Dog training
- The Amazing Acro-Cats
