= Ian Dunbar =

Veterinarian, ethologist, and dog trainer

- Born: April 15, 1947 (age 79); United Kingdom
- Education: Royal Veterinary College (Special honours: Physiology and Biochemistry); University of California at Berkeley (PhD in Ethology)
- Occupation: Director of The Center for Applied Animal Behavior
- Title: Doctor
- Spouse: Kelly Dunbar (former spouse)

Ian Dunbar (born April 15, 1947) is a veterinarian, ethologist, and the developer of Sirius Dog Training method. He founded the Association of Pet Dog Trainers, a professional organization.

== Early life and education ==
He received his veterinary degree and a Special Honours degree in Physiology & Biochemistry from the Royal Veterinary College (London University), and a doctorate in ethology from the Psychology Department at UC Berkeley, where he researched the development of social hierarchies and aggression in domestic dogs.

== Career ==
He is the founder of the Association of Pet Dog Trainers (APDT) started in 1993. Dunbar also serves as a dog ethologist expert and on the advisory board for DogTime.com.

His often-cited Dunbar Dog Bite Scale provides a description of the severity of dog bites that can be used for an objective analysis of the danger a dog poses and whether training can be expected to mitigate the problem. It is used by medical professionals and animal enforcement personnel.

Over the past 35 years, Dunbar has given over 1000 seminars and workshops around the world for dog trainers and veterinarians in an effort to popularize off-leash puppy socialization classes, temperament modification, and owner-friendly and dog-friendly dog training. Additionally, Dunbar has consulted on a variety of movies—full-length features, documentaries and animation (including Pixar's UP) and he has twice spoken at the prestigious e.g. Conference.

== Puppy training ==
In 1982, concerned that many dog "failures" are due to lack of training, Dunbar designed and taught off-leash puppy socialization and training classes titled SIRIUS Puppy Training. His approach to training puppies is based on a reward system. His approach is contrasted to the more noted approach by Cesar Millan which uses dominance over the dog for training. Dunbar states that he doesn't think a submissive dog is a happy dog.

Dunbar cites two behavioralists, John Paul Scott and John L. Fuller, as having influenced his own behavioral approach to dog training.

In 1982 Dunbar founded Sirius Dog Training, the first off-leash training program specifically for puppies. The program emphasizes the importance of teaching bite inhibition, early socialization, temperament training, and simple solutions for common and predictable behavior problems, as well as basic household manners, to dogs under six months of age.

== Methods ==
Ian's dog training method focuses on rewarding positive behavior with affirmation and treats, rather than trying to correct negative behaviors through forced submission. His study of dog behaviour has led him to conclude that dogs seek out the attention of people and will do things that will earn them favor with humans. This an evolutionary trait that allowed them to co-exist and benefit from the scraps of food humans shared with them. He does not believe in asserting dominance over your dog, or that dogs should be actively punished if they do something wrong, rather dogs should be rewarded for correct behaviour.

His dog training program typically starts by using treats and effusive praise to reward behaviour you want repeated. Once the dog is comfortable with the action, treats are slowly weened and only the use of positive affirmations are needed to keep the wanted behaviour. Since dogs need to repeat actions over and over before understanding a pattern, establishing a pattern of positive rewards for positive actions allows them to please their owners. He is also a proponent of crate training for puppies.

== Books and videos ==
- Ian Dunbar (June 1979). Dog Behavior. TFH Publications. ISBN 978-0-86622-800-8. LCCN 98039314. OCLC 62959214. OL 8328310M.
- Ian Dunbar (1996). How to teach a new dog old tricks. Berkeley, Calif: James & Kenneth Publishers. ISBN 1-888047-06-2. LCCN 2003389159. OCLC 41480119. OL 3731891M.
- Dr. Ian Dunbar (April 29, 2004). Before and After Getting Your Puppy. New World Library. ISBN 978-1-57731-455-4. LCCN 2004002055. OL 8750389M.
- Ian Dunbar (2023). Barking up the Right Tree. New World Library. ISBN 978-1-60868-771-8. OL 49587444M.
- Ian Dunbar (1989). Sirius Puppy Training (Video). Beverly Hills, CA: Pacific Arts Video.

== Articles ==
- Doty, Richard L.; Dunbar, Ian (1974). "Attraction of beagles to conspecific urine, vaginal and anal sac secretion odors". Physiology & Behavior. 12 (5): 825–833. doi:10.1016/0031-9384(74)90020-1. ISSN 0031-9384. PMID 4857912.
- Dunbar, Ian F. (1977). "Olfactory preferences in dogs: the response of male and female beagles to conspecific odors". Behavioral Biology. 20 (4): 471–481. doi:10.1016/S0091-6773(77)91079-3. ISSN 0091-6773. PMID 561600.
- Dunbar, I., & Buehler, M. (1980). A masking effect of urine from male dogs. Applied Animal Ethology, 6(3), 297-301.
- Berman, M., & Dunbar, I. (1983). The social behaviour of free-ranging suburban dogs. Applied Animal Ethology, 10(1-2), 5-17.
