= Clicker =

Small noisemaker, used in animal training

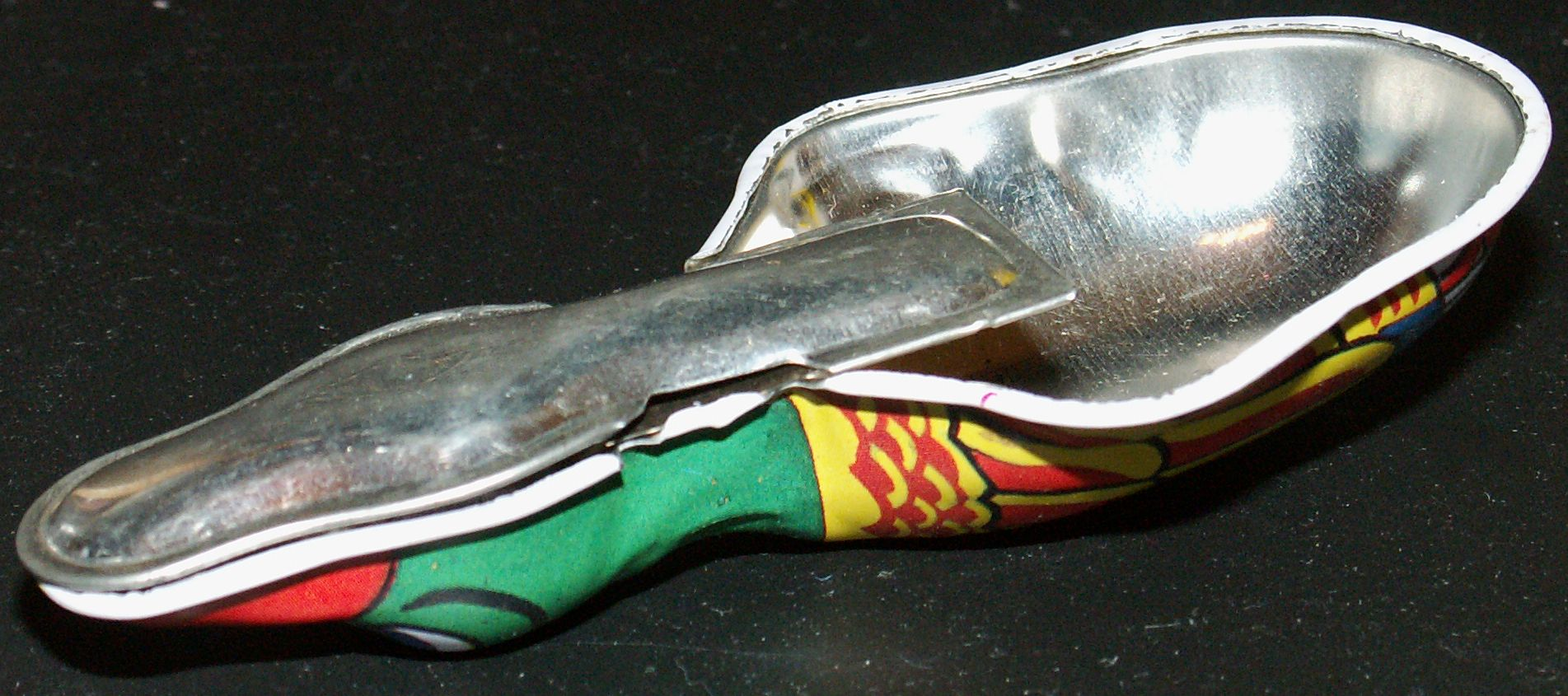
Duck clicker, underside

clicker ("buckling cap") is a spring with two stable states

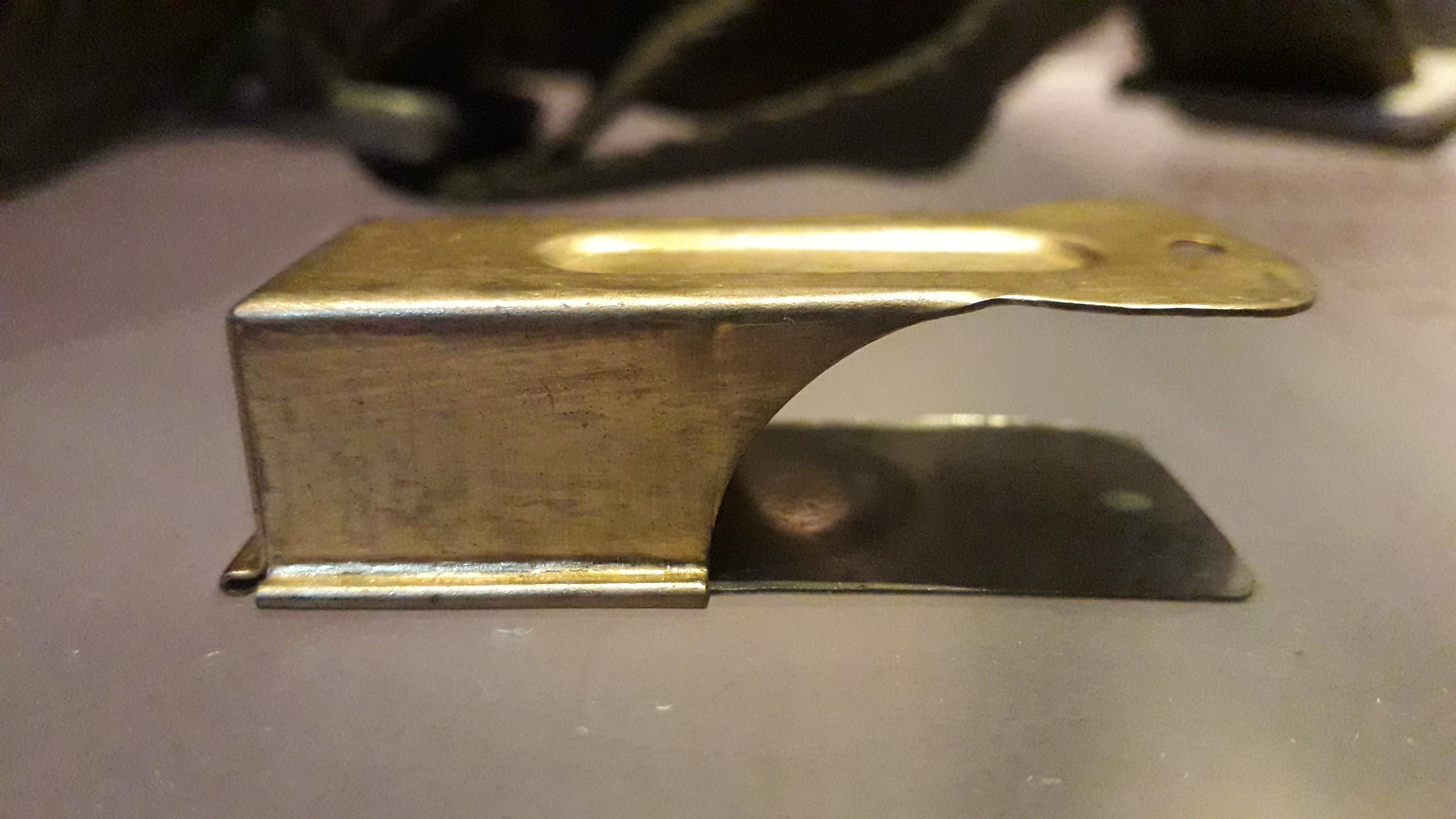
D-Day cricket issued to Allied paratroopers

D-Day cricket (sound)

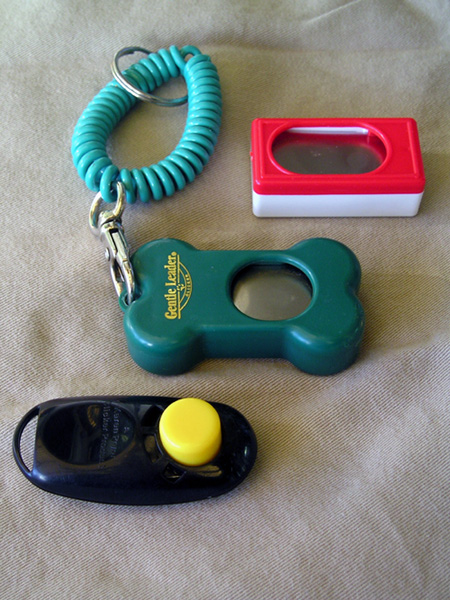
Clicker-training clickers come in various shapes and forms.

Dog clicker (sound)

A clicker, sometimes called a cricket, is any device that makes a clicking sound, usually when deliberately activated by its owner.

They usually consist of a piece of thin metal or plastic held in a casing so that the metal is slightly torqued; depressing one end of the metal causes it to pop out of alignment and releasing it causes it to pop back into alignment, each time making a sharp *click*-ing sound.

With some clickers, the user depresses the metal directly with thumb or finger; with others, a button extends above the surface of the casing so that depressing the button makes the metal click.

== Social uses ==
- In World War II clickers were used by Allied paratroopers preceding and during Operation Overlord as a way of covertly identifying friend from foe. A soldier would click once and if two clicks were received in return from an unidentifiable soldier then his identification was confirmed.
- Clickers are used to provide audible feedback for human students learning using a method called TAGteach.
- Clickers were used to organize Catholic group activity.

"The clickers were dime store crickets that made a nice, loud click, perfect for signaling a First Communion class so all the kids would stand up at the same time, and kneel at the same time, and start filing down the aisle together." — Roger Ebert

== Animal training uses ==
Clickers were first used by marine mammal trainer Karen Pryor as a way of communicating with her animals. Dolphins and whales communicate underwater through a series of clicks and whistles known as echolocation, and the clicker allowed a trainer to produce signals they were more likely to understand.

Clickers are now used to train dogs, and other animals. When associated with a treat, a click allows the owner to mark the precise moment the desired behavior is executed.

== Other uses ==
- Clickers are also used as a handheld counting device, sometimes digital but more commonly mechanical, used to keep a count of the numbers of people entering a venue. It is often used by nightclub doorstaff to make sure fire limits are not exceeded.
- A clicker is a device used on recurve bows to signal to the archer that correct draw length has been achieved, thus aiding consistency.
- Some board games designed after game shows come with clickers that are meant to emulate the buzzers common on such shows.
- Clickers are used by some kink practitioners, in particular in the context of pet play.
