= Dolores Vallecita =

American vaudeville entertainer and circus animal trainer (1877–1925)

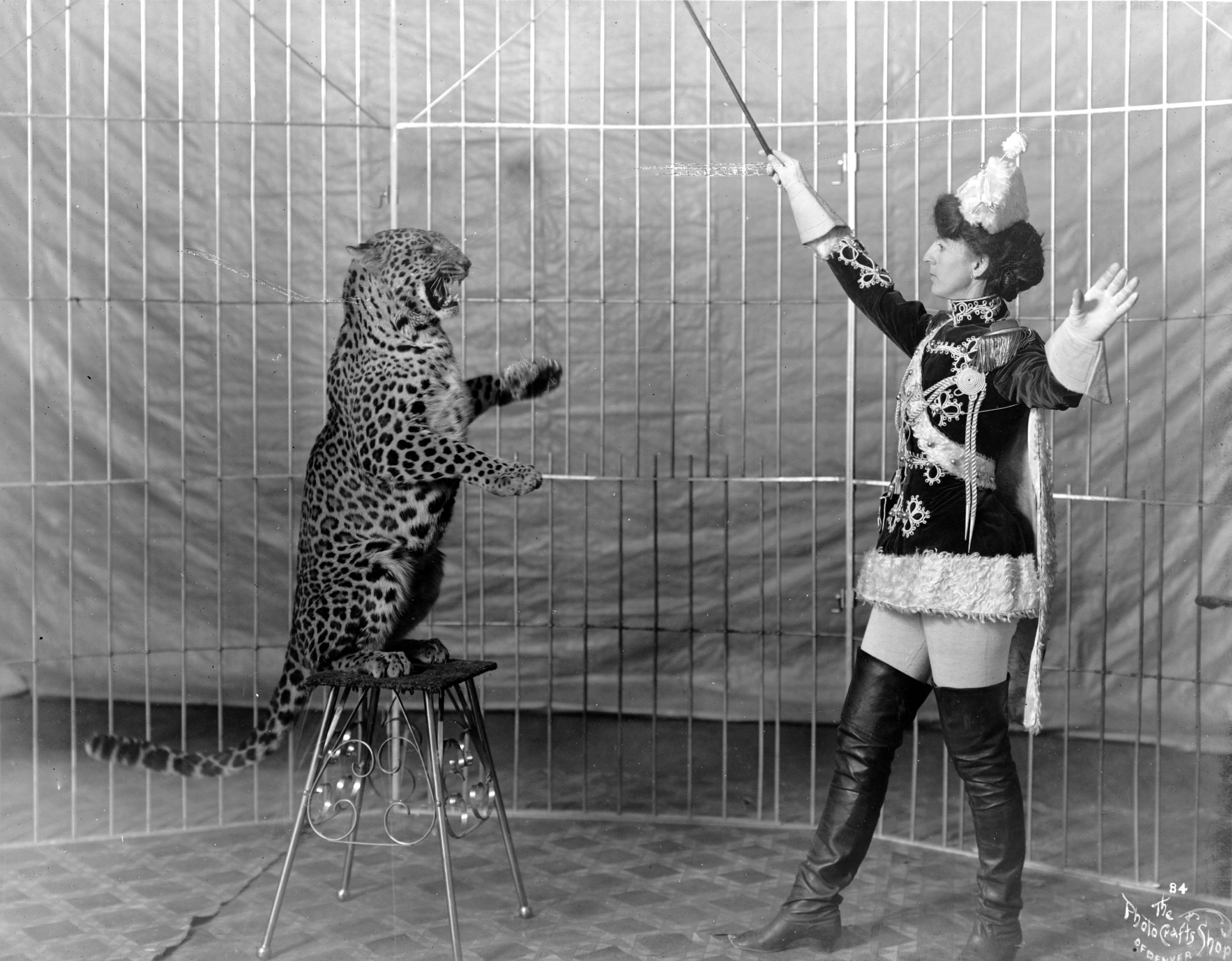
Dolores Vallecita

Dolores Vallecita (May 10, 1877 – January 13, 1925), also known as Dolly Vallecita Hill, was an American vaudeville entertainer and circus animal trainer.

== Biography ==
She was born on May 10, 1877, at Natchez, Mississippi, United States, although some sources also claim she was born in Spain. While raising Shetland ponies for business purpose, she came into contact with circus people. Vallecita worked as an animal trainer for Frank Bostock, and began training wild animals from 1900. She gradually developed interest on wild animals, and started to train them.

She made her debut at Austin & Stone's Museum, Boston, in 1905, with a pair of pumas, a leopard and a lion. She later moved to Denver, and purchased five leopards. She had a number of successful appearances at Luna Park, Scranton, Pennsylvania. These performances were not without controversy, with the Massachusetts SPCA charging her in Our Dumb Animals with the "effrontery to advertise herself as 'an active member of the [SPCA]'" despite owning (at least) two full grown Indian leopards. She trained her troupe of six Indian leopards to perform different tricks including rolling globes, see saw, electric wheel, forming a pyramid, and posing for pictures.

During 1907–1908, she toured the world, and performed in a number of major cities including London, Berlin, and Havana.

She married a New Yorker-based animal broker Arthur I. Hill.

She died in Bay City, Michigan in the building now known as Old City Hall Restaurant on January 13, 1925, following a mishap that occurred when one of her leopards swiped at her, tearing out her throat. She died shortly afterwards in Mercy Hospital.
