= Anatoly Durov =

Russian animal trainer (1887–1928)

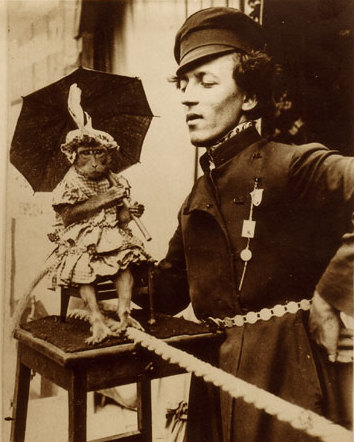
Anatoly Durov Junior

Anatoly Anatolyevich Durov (sometimes spelled Durow) (Russian: Анато́лий Анато́льевич Ду́ров) (1887–1928) was a renowned 20th century animal trainer. He was a member of the Durov family of performers who raised the quality and prestige of the Russian circus.

== Background ==
Anatoly Anatolyevich's great-grandmother, Nadezhda Durova, was the first female officer in the Russian Army, who became a decorated soldier in the Russian cavalry during the Napoleonic Wars. His mother, née Tereza Stadler, was a talented circus horse rider of German descent and owned the Bavarian Circus] Long and successful tours led her to make Russia her home. His father, Anatoly Durov, was born to an old noble family and broke with it to join a traveling troupe. Anatoly (Jr.) was a good acrobat, a magician, and a monologue reciter. Anatoly (Sr.) and Vladimir Durov were the first of the Durov clan to gain fame as circus entertainers.

== Career ==
Anatoly (Jr.) made his circus debut in 1914 in the Nikitin brothers' circus in the city of Ryazan. His real fame came in the years following the Russian Revolution of 1917. The younger Anatoly Durov performed with a large and varied group of animals. His performance commentary was always biting and topical. He toured abroad in 1921.

In Serbia he performed in the city of Subotica in the variety show Alhambra; in the city of Zagreb in the Music Hall; in the city of Sarajevo in the Winter Garden. In November 1921, he signed a contract for performances in the cities of Graz and Vienna, Austria with the international circus Orpheus for 500,000 kronor plus travel expenses.

In 1922-1923 he toured throughout the Italy, performing in Rome, Milan, Padua (Padua), Genoa (Genova), Bari, Venice, Bologna, Treviso, Adria (Atria), and other places.

At the request of Queen Elena of Italy, Anatoly (Jr.) gave a private performance at the royal villa. His performing dog Petit lived in the queen's apartment for three days. Queen Elena granted Anatoly Durov Jun. a golden cigarette-case and a letter of thanks.

After his tours across Europe and the United States, Anatoly Durov returned to Soviet Russia and founded an entertainment program that gained international recognition. In 1926 he settled in the city of Taganrog on Shevchenko street 111, where he founded The Taganrog Animal Theater of Anatoly Durov.

Anatoly Anatolyevich Durov died in 1928 in a hunting accident near Izhevsk. Anatoly Durov was interred at Taganrog Old Cemetery.

His nephews, Vladimir Grigorievich Durov (1909-1972) and Yury Vladimirovich Durov (1909-1971) continued in his footsteps. Both became People's Artists of the USSR. Currently the Durov Theater in Moscow is run by Tereza Durova (b. September 5, 1926), a niece.

== External links and references ==
- "Энциклопедия Таганрога". — Ростов-на-Дону: Ростиздат, 2003. — 512 с. — ISBN 5-7509-0662-0.
- Anatoly Durov Jun. Museum in Taganrog
