= Karen Pryor =

American author (1932–2025)

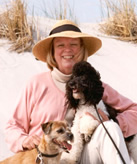
- Born: Karen Liane Wylie; May 14, 1932; New York City, U.S.
- Died: January 4, 2025 (aged 92); Santa Clarita, California, U.S.
- Occupation: Author
- Spouses: Taylor "Tap" Pryor (m. 1954; div. 1975) Jon Lindbergh (m. 1983; div. 1997)
- Children: 3
- Parent: Philip Wylie (father)
- Relatives: Charles Lindbergh (father-in-law) Anne Morrow Lindbergh (mother-in-law)

Karen Liane Pryor (née Wylie; May 14, 1932 – January 4, 2025) was an American author who specialized in behavioral psychology and marine mammal biology. She was the founder and proponent of clicker training. She was formerly a Marine Mammal Commissioner to the U.S. government.

== Life and career ==
Pryor was the daughter of author Philip Wylie and antiques dealer Sally Ondeck Wylie.

Her uncle was Max Wylie, co-creator of The Flying Nun. Her cousin, Janice Wylie, was murdered in 1963 along with her roommate Emily Hoffert in what became known as the Career Girls Murders.

She was first married to Tap Pryor from 1954 until their divorce in 1975. They had three children: Ted, Michael and Gale. Her second marriage was to Jon Lindbergh, son of aviator Charles Lindbergh and writer Anne Morrow Lindbergh; they divorced in 1997.

In 2007 she created the Karen Pryor Academy which offers certification programs for animal trainers.

Pryor died at a care facility in Santa Clarita, California on January 4, 2025, at the age of 92 from complications of dementia.

== Publications ==
Books and Articles:

- On My Mind: Reflections on Animal Behavior and Learning – 2014
- Reaching The Animal Mind: Clicker Training and What It Teaches Us About All Animals – 2009
- Click to Win: Clicker Training for the Show Ring – 2002
- Dolphin Societies: Discoveries and Puzzles –ed. with Kenneth Norris; University of California Press, 1998
- Don’t Shoot The Dog: The New Art of Teaching and Training – 1984, 1999, 2002, 2006
- A Dog & a Dolphin 2.0: An Introduction To Clicker Training – 1996
- Getting Started: Clicker Training for Cats – 1999, 2002, 2004
- Getting Started: Clicker Training for Dogs – 1999, 2002, 2005
- Lads Before the Wind – 1975, 1994, 2000 (Harper & Row 1975)
- Nursing Your Baby – 1963, 1973, 1991, 2005 (HarperCollins Publishers 1963)
- On Behavior: Essays and Research – 1994
- Crunch and Des: Classic Stories of Saltwater Fishing – 2002
- How To Teach Your Dog To Play Frisbee – 1985
- Pryor, K. (2014). A dolphin journey. Aquatic Mammals 40th Anniversary: Special Issue, 104–115.
- Pryor, K. & Chase, S. (2014). Training for variable and innovative behavior. International Journal of Comparative Psychology, 27, 218–225
- Pryor, K. & Ramirez, K. (2014) Modern Animal Training. In The Wiley-Blackwell Handbook of Operant and Classical Conditioning. McSweeney, F.K and Murphy, E. S. (Eds.).
- Pryor, K.W (2001). Cultural transmission of behavior in animals: How a modern training technology uses spontaneous social imitation in cetaceans and Behavioral and Brain Sciences, 24, 352–352
- Pryor, K. & Shallenberger, I. (1991). School structure in spotted dolphins (Stenella attenuata) in the tuna purse seine fishery in the Eastern Tropical Pacific. In Dolphin Societies: Discoveries and Puzzles. Pryor, K. & Norris, K.S. (Eds.). Berkeley: University of California Press
- Pryor, K. (1981). Why Porpoise Trainers Are Not Dolphin Lovers: Real and False Communication in the Operant Setting. Annals of the New York Academy of Sciences, 364, 1, 137
- Norris, K.S., Pryor, K. (1970). A Tagging Method for Small Cetaceans. Journal of Mammalogy, 51, 3, 609–610
- Pryor, K.W., Haang, R., & O’Reilly, J. (1969). The creative porpoise: Training for novel behavior. Journal of the Experimental Analysis of Behavior, 12, 653–661
- Lang, T.G., Pryor, K. (1966). Hydrodynamic Performance of Porpoises (Stenella attenuata). Science, 152, 3721, 531–533.
- Pryor, T., Pryor, K.,& Norris, S.K. (1965). Observations on a Pygmy Killer Whale (Feresa attenuata Gray) from Hawaii. Journal of Mammalogy, 46, 3, 450–461.
