= Sylvia Rideoutt Bishop =

American horse trainer (1920–2004)

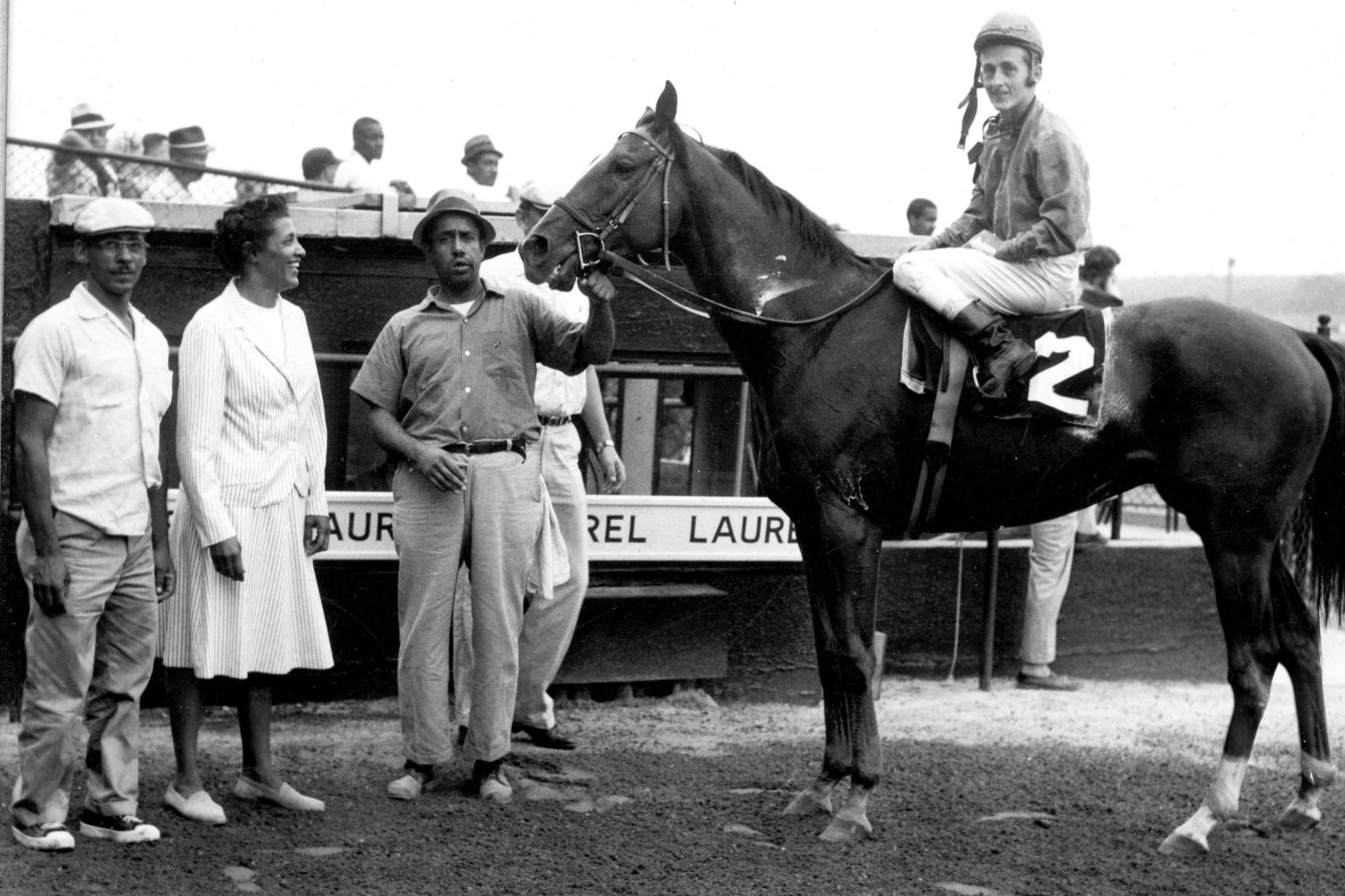
Sylvia Rideoutt Bishop, standing next to “Bright Gem” with jockey Jack Sollars

Sylvia Rideoutt Bishop (October 5, 1920 – December 27, 2004) was an American horse trainer. In 1954, Bishop became the first female African American to train Thoroughbreds in the United States when the West Virginia Legislature authorized her with the license for training racehorses. Between 1987 and 2000, Bishop's horses won 44 races, earning a total of US$166,633.

== Biography ==
Born on October 5, 1920, in Charles Town, West Virginia, United States, Sylvia Rideoutt Bishop was the daughter of James H. and his wife Barbara Snowden Rideout. Since her childhood, Bishop showed love for horses and hanged around the Charles Town horse tracks and stables. At the age of 17, she quit school and became a horse trainer in a male dominated world of horse race industry in the 1940s and 1950s.

During her 60 years long career in horse racing, she trained about 200 steeds for the track primarily for the Charles Town race track. Her clients included Nelson Bunker Hunt, a Texas oil baron; Edward L. Stephenson, a real estate investor, and Tyson Gilpin. She retired in 2000 citing worsening arthritis.

She was inducted into the Hall of Fame at the Charles Town Races.

She died on December 27, 2004, in Charles Town, West Virginia.
