= Lion taming =

Training big cats for performance

Lion tamer
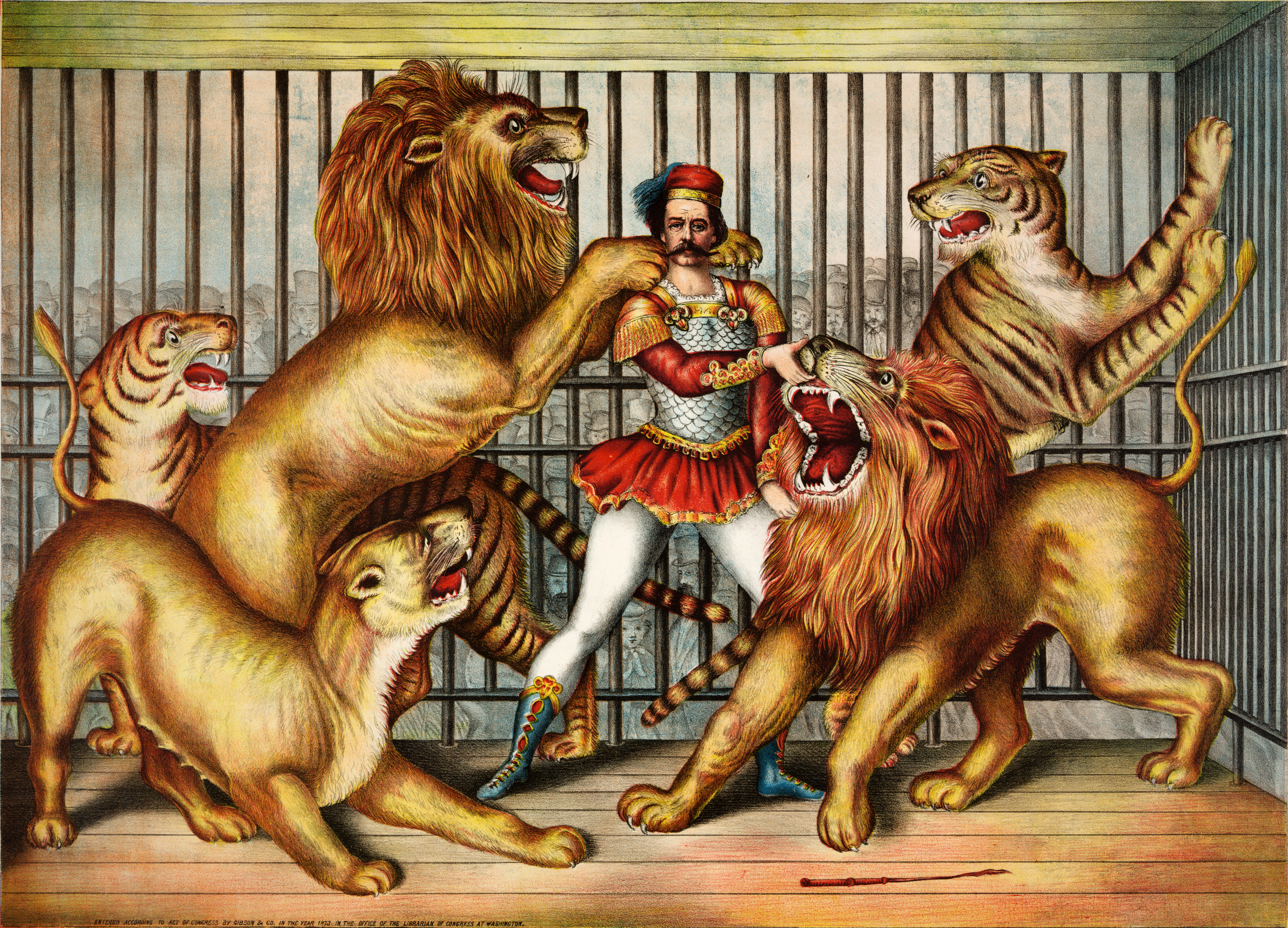
- 19th-century lithograph of a lion tamer

Occupation
- Occupation type: Performing arts
- Activity sectors: Entertainment, show business

Description
- Fields of employment: Circus
- Related jobs: Animal trainer

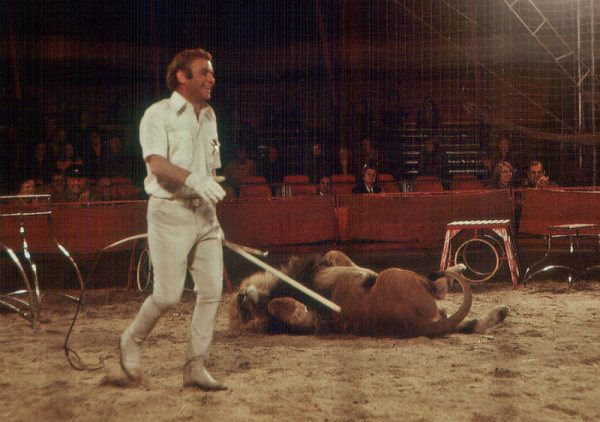
Lion tamer and circus director Gerd Siemoneit-Barum, during a show in Nordenham, Germany in 1977

Lion taming is the taming and training of lions, either for protection or for use in entertainment, such as the circus. The term often applies to the taming and display of lions and other big cats such as tigers, leopards, jaguars, cheetahs, and cougars. Lion taming is used as a popular metaphor for any dangerous activity. Lion taming occurs in zoos around the world to enable the keepers to carry out medical procedures and feedings.

The Captive Animals Protection Society maintains that animal welfare cannot be guaranteed in circuses. The use of lions in circuses have been affected by bans on circus animals in some countries.

== Notable lion tamers ==
In chronological order

- George Wombwell (1777–1850), founder of Wombwell's Traveling Menagerie, raised many animals himself, including the first lion bred in captivity in Britain.
- Isaac A. Van Amburgh (1811–1865), American animal trainer who developed the first trained wild animal act in modern times. He was known for acts of daring, such as placing his head inside the jaws of a wild cat, and became known as "The Lion King".
- Thomas Macarte (c. 1839–1872), killed during a performance in 1872
- Martini Maccomo (c. 1839–1871), a lion tamer in Victorian Britain
- Carl Hagenbeck (1844–1913), a merchant of wild animals
- Suresh Biswas (1861–1905), Indian circus performer popular in Europe in the 1880s for taming wild animals
- Hezekiah Moscow (c. 1862–c. 1901), Jamaican boxer who worked as a lion tamer in the mid-1880s.
- Claire Heliot (1866–1953), German lion tamer, born Klara Haumann (Huth)
- Tilly Bébé (1879–1932), Austrian lion and polar bear tamer
- Rose Flanders Bascom (1880–1915), first American female lion tamer
- Mabel Stark (1889–1968), one of the world's first women tiger tamers
- Clyde Beatty (1903–1965), one of the pioneers of using a chair in training big cats
- Irina Bugrimova (1911–2001), the first female lion tamer in Russia
- Gunther Gebel-Williams (1934–2001), a world-famous animal trainer for the Red Unit with Ringling Bros. and Barnum & Bailey Circus.
- Siegfried & Roy. Performer duo of Siegfried Fischbacher (1939–2021) and Roy Horn (1944–2020), while primarily known as magicians, they were famous as big cat handlers. Their Las Vegas show featured dozens of white lions and tigers.
- Ángel Cristo (1943–2010), the most famous lion and tiger tamer in Spain, known for his numerous accidents under lion and tiger attacks. In 1982 he won the Medalla de Oro del Festival Internacional del Circo ('Golden Medal of the Circus International Festival').
- Martin Lacey (born 1947), animal trainer, owner of the Great British Circus, trained most of the tigers used in the ESSO TV advertisements in the 1970s.
- Martin Lacey Jr. (born 1977), son of Martin, an animal trainer and performer with Circus Krone in Munich

== In popular culture ==
The 1941 circus film The Wagons Roll at Night tells the story of the rookie lion tamer Matt Varney. In the finale, the circus manager Nick Coster tries to have him killed in the lion cage by giving Matt an unloaded tamer's gun. A couple of lion tamers are the protagonists of the French film Roselyne and the Lions (1989).
