= Ellen Blight =

English lion tamer (1833–1850)

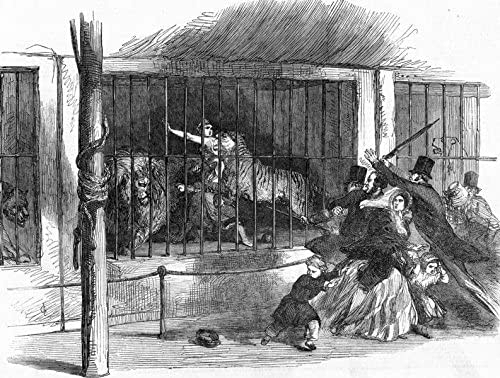
Death of Lion Queen, Wombwell's Menagerie, Illustrated London News, 1850

Ellen Eliza Blight (1833–1850), also known as Helen Bright, was an English lion tamer, known as "The Lion Queen", who was killed by a tiger while working in her uncle George Wombwell's menagerie, aged 17. Her shocking death made her a media sensation.

== Early life ==
Her father was John Blight (sometimes Bright), a bugler and bandleader in Wombwell's menagerie, and her mother was Elizabeth, sister of George Wombwell. She appeared as "The Lion Queen" in 1849, after a famous lion tamer Eleanor Chapman Sanger, who performed before Queen Victoria on 28 October 1847 at Windsor Castle, left George Wombwell's menagerie to join George Sanger’s travelling variety show.

== Death ==
On the evening of 11 January 1850 the George Wombwell's menagerie was at Chatham. A group of officers asked Bright to perform for them after the public show. She entered a cage which contained both a lion and a tiger, and touched the tiger's nose with her whip. It jumped at her and caught her dress, making her fall to the ground where it clawed her leg and then her throat. She was pulled out of the cage unconscious and attended by a doctor but died within a few minutes, in front of her parents and one of her brothers. The Daily News reported on 14 January 1850:

Richard Cooper Todd, surgeon, attached to the Royal Artillery, stationed in Brompton Barracks, said he was witnessing the exhibition at the time of the occurrence and was standing quite close to the rope in front of the den. He saw the deceased enter and going in the tiger did not appear to be very friendly with her; she struck him on going in and he laid down. She then proceeded to her performance with the lion and afterwards turned round and again struck the tiger. It appeared angry and immediately seemed to turn upon the deceased; rearing upon his hind legs and seizing her by the neck, she fell on her back and the tiger crouching over her, he[the surgeon] saw no more of her until removed from the den, when he hastened to her assistance. She was perfectly insensible and had lost a great deal of blood and her face and lips were very pale. She was still alive, the heart was beating, but she was perfectly unconscious. Witness placed his hand on the wound in the neck to stop the bleeding and administered some brandy to deceased, but she was unable to swallow it and in a very few minutes her heart ceased to beat. There were four wounds on the left side of the neck, a slight wound on the right leg and another on the chin, caused by the teeth of the tiger, the under jaw of the animal having caused a very large wound under the chin, which aided by the shock her system had sustained, produced death.The jury returned a verdict to the effect that deceased was killed by a male tiger whilst exhibiting in its den and expressed a strong opinion against the practice of allowing personsto perform in a den with animals.It will be remembered that, when, about two years since, Mr Wombwell exhibited his menagerie to the royal family at Windsor, the "Lion Queen" was especially anxious to exhibit the extraordinary command which she had acquired over the fierce animals, but her Majesty expressly forbade the performance. Since then the unfortunate deceased had been the great attraction of the exhibition in all the principal towns of the United Kingdom. It is to be hoped that this horrible termination to her career may have the effect of preventing such performances for the future.

At the inquest, held in the Golden Lion hotel in Chatham, it was reported that the tiger "[held] her furiously by the neck, inserting the teeth of the upper jaw in her chin and closing his mouth, inflicting frightful injury in the throat by his fangs."

Blight was buried in Coventry where she shares a grave with her cousin William Wombwell, who had been killed by an elephant the previous year while working at Coventry Show Fair with a different menagerie. The tiger lived and was exhibited by Wombwell as "the animal which killed The Lion Queen".

== Remembrance ==
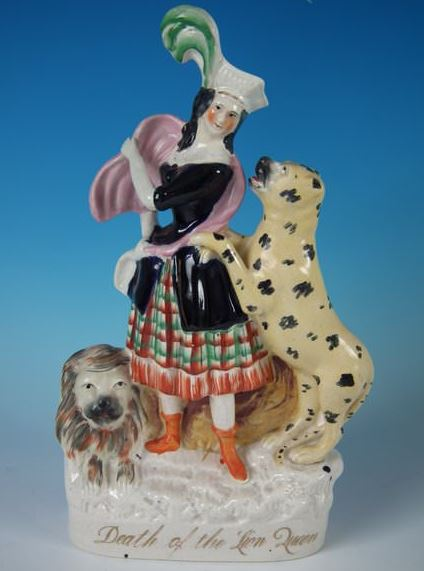
Staffordshire pottery figurine

Her death was reported in national and local newspapers including the Daily News, Derby Mercury, Bristol Mercury, Rochester, Chatham and Strood Gazette, and the Dover Chronicle, among others.

A Staffordshire pottery figurine was produced, showing the Lion Queen with the lion and the tiger, although the tiger was sometimes painted spotted, as a leopard. An example is held in the National Portrait Gallery, as part of the Art Fund Popular Portraits Collection, and another in Rochester Guildhall Museum in Kent. The piece is 14.2 inches (36 cm) high and bears the title "Death of the Lion Queen" on its base.

== See also ==
- Animal training
- Lion taming
- Claire Heliot
- Rose Flanders Bascom
- Mabel Stark
