= Blighter =

Blighter or Blighters may refer to:

- Blighter, a character class in the game Dungeons and Dragons
- Blighter, a fictional hominid species in the Age of Fire fantasy novels by E. E. Knight
- The Blighters, a fictional street gang in the video game Assassin's Creed Syndicate

== See also ==
- Blight (disambiguation)
- Blighty (disambiguation)
