= Heliot =

Heliot may refer to:

- Claire Heliot, German woman lion tamer born Klara Haumann (Huth) (1866–1953)
- Johan Heliot, pen name of French science fiction writer Stéphane Boillot-Cousin (born 1970)
- Heliot Ramos (born 1999), Puerto Rican professional baseball player
