= Helen Bright =

Helen Bright may refer to:

- Helen Bright Clark (1840–1927), British women's rights activist and suffragist
- Ellen Blight (1833–1850), English lion-tamer killed by a tiger
