= Blight (disambiguation) =

Blight is a symptom affecting plants in response to infection.

Blight may also refer to:

- Blight or urban decay; abandoned, derelict, or severely neglected buildings and lots, slums

== Fiction ==
- Blight, a character from Transformers: Energon
- Derek Powers / Blight, a supervillain in the animated series Batman Beyond
- Amity Blight, a character in the animated series The Owl House
- Dr. Blight, a villain in the animated series Captain Planet and the Planeteers
- The Blight, terraforming microbes in Outpost 2: Divided Destiny
- The Blight, a malevolent quasi-Power in the novel A Fire Upon the Deep
- Blight, a group of worlds devastated by a dangerous technology in the book Worlds of the Imperium
- Blight, a character in the Hunger Games novel Catching Fire and the associated film
- Blight, a disastrous event that occurs periodically in the Dragon Age universe

== Other uses ==
- Blight (album), 2025 album by The Antlers
- Blight (band), an American hardcore punk band
- Blight (play), a 1917 play by Oliver St. John Gogarty
- Blight (surname)
- Blighted (video game), by DrinkBox Studios

== See also ==
- Blighty (disambiguation)
