= Noah's Ark Zoo Farm =

Zoo and farm in England

- Noah's Ark Zoo Farm Logo

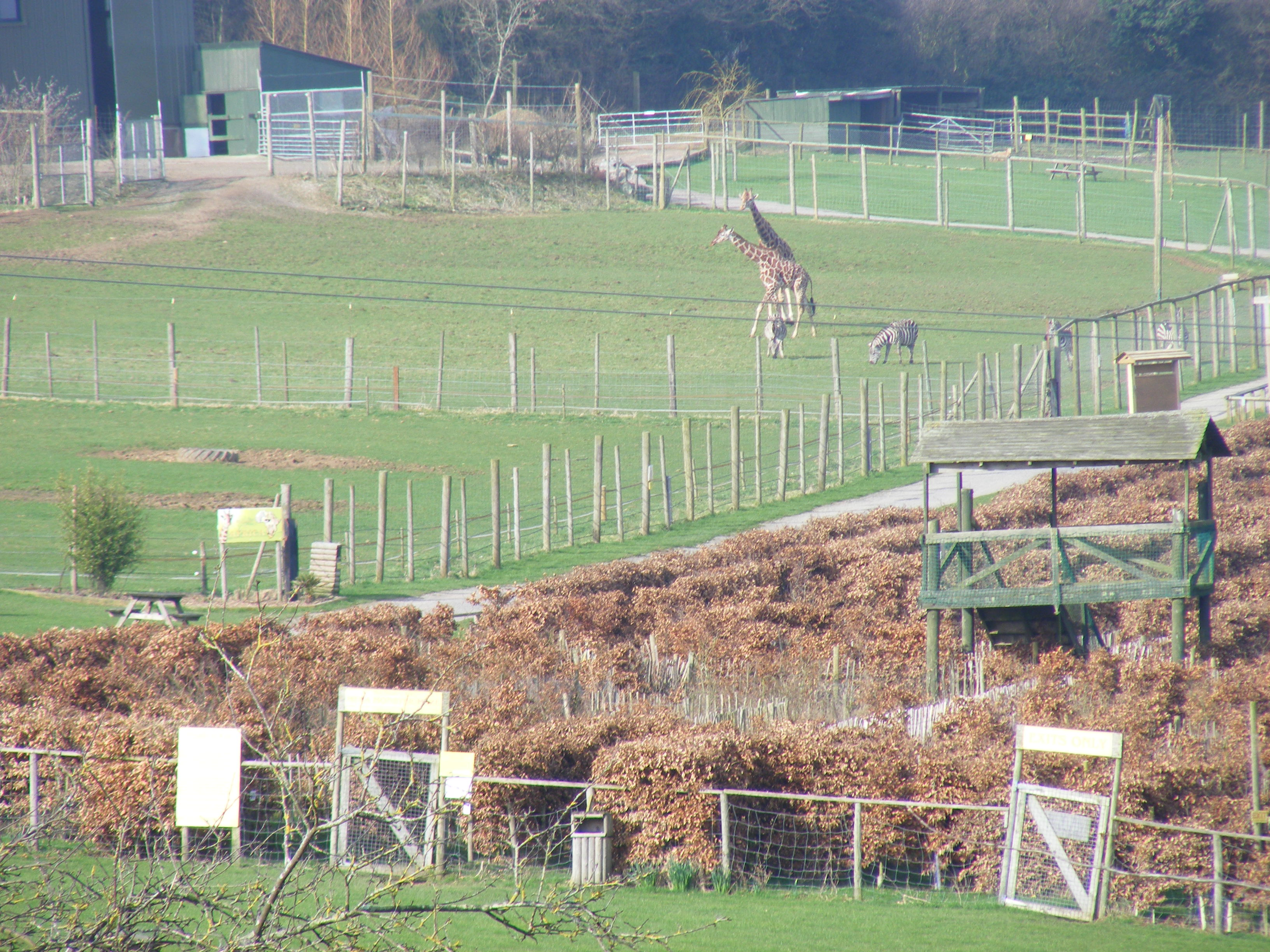
- Interactive map of Noah's Ark Zoo Farm
- 51.4541°N 2.7401°W
- Date opened: 1998–1999
- Location: Wraxall, North Somerset, United Kingdom
- Land area: 100 acres (40 ha)
- Annual visitors: 170,000
- Website: www.noahsarkzoofarm.co.uk

Noah's Ark Zoo Farm is a 100-acre (40 ha) zoo developed on a working farm in Wraxall, North Somerset, 6 miles (9.7 km) west of Bristol, England. It is home to the largest elephant facility in northern Europe.

== History ==
=== Development ===
Noah's Ark Zoo Farm was conceived by Anthony Bush (born 1938), the son of a Wiltshire farm manager. In 1960 he became a tenant of Richard Gibbs, Lord Wraxall, at Moat House Farm, near Bristol, which Bush operated as a dairy farm. In 1962 he married Christina James, an art teacher, and they had four children. In 1968 Bush was elected onto the Somerset County Executive Committee of the National Farmers Union, and in 1980, he began a Farming and Wildlife Advisory Group to encourage farmers to conserve wildlife.

In 1995 the Bushes purchased Moat House Farm from Wraxall, sold the Friesian herd, and converted the farm's 310 acres (130 ha) to arable land and sheep raising. Bush began to consider creating a Noah's Ark theme park in 1997; and in 1998, he constructed a barn, a café, a toilet block, and a children's play area. The park opened for a trial run in August 1998 and permanently in 1999. At first it exhibited farm and small domestic animals as well as some exotic species such as alpacas and llamas. The collection later expanded to include tigers, African lions, white rhinos, siamang gibbons, and ring-tailed lemurs. In April 2009, a zoo webcam showed the live birth of a male Brazilian tapir.

The zoo's hedge maze, planted in 2003, is 3.38 kilometres (2.10 mi) long. - the longest in the UK

=== Creationism and criticism ===
During Anthony Bush's tenure as managing director of the zoo, he promoted his belief in creationism. Physical anthropologist Alice Roberts, professor of Public Engagement in Science at the University of Birmingham said the zoo had "absolutely nothing to do with science education" but noted that during her visit in 2013, she saw little evidence of creationism until she entered a "large barn in the middle of the complex, which houses an auditorium and an impressive indoor children's play area," where she found many displays promoting creationism. In 2009, the zoo was criticised by the British Centre for Science Education for "contradicting vast swaths of science needed to pass public examinations" (contrary to its claim that it supported the National Curriculum) and by Ben Goldacre. In August 2009, the British Humanist Association urged tourist boards to stop promoting the zoo on grounds that it would "undermine education and the teaching of science"; a campaign continued until February 2014.

=== 2009 charges of professional misconduct ===
In October 2009 the BBC and the Captive Animals Protection Society charged that the zoo's tigers and camels belonged to the now-defunct Great British Circus owned by Martin Lacey; and the zoo said a number of animals were on loan from Linctrek Ltd, a company associated with Lacey, though none had taken part in any circus performances. In December 2009, British and Irish Association of Zoos and Aquariums (BIAZA) temporarily stripped the zoo of its membership for what it claimed was a refusal of Noah's Ark to provide BIAZA requested information and for bringing "the association into disrepute." Tighter licence conditions were imposed on the zoo, including inspection by independent veterinarians every six months.

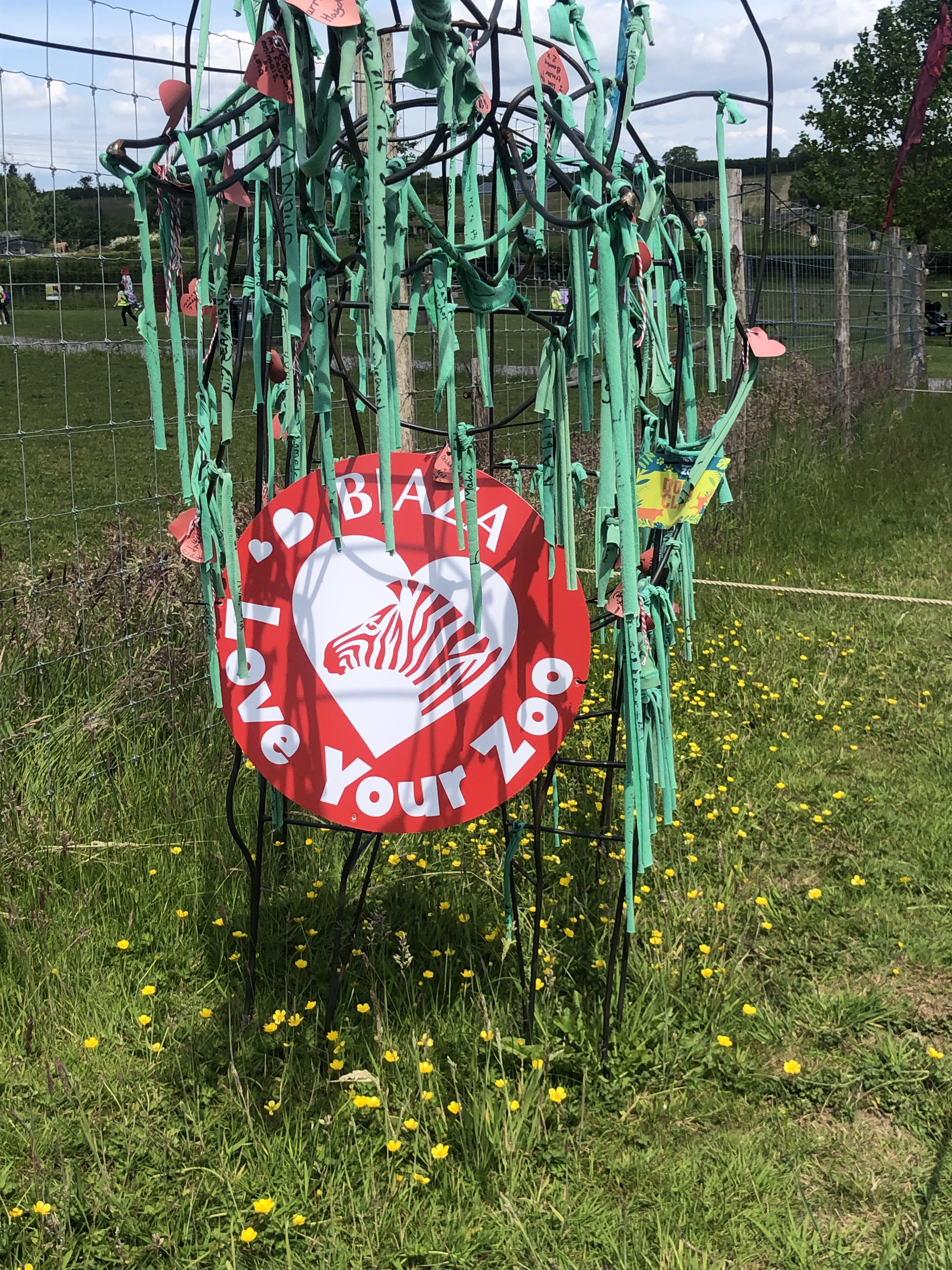
BIAZA Love Your Zoo sign at entrance walkway to Noah's Ark

In 2018, due to adherence to the aforementioned conditions, the zoo regained BIAZA membership.

After the 2009 penalties, the zoo began the lengthy procedure to achieve charity status. This change was instigated by Anthony Bush's son, Larry, who took up the position as managing director in 2019. Describing the acquisition of charitable status, Larry said "visitors can also enjoy the knowledge that their admission directly funds the vital conservation work of the charity in the UK and around the world." The zoo became a charity on 5 April 2023.

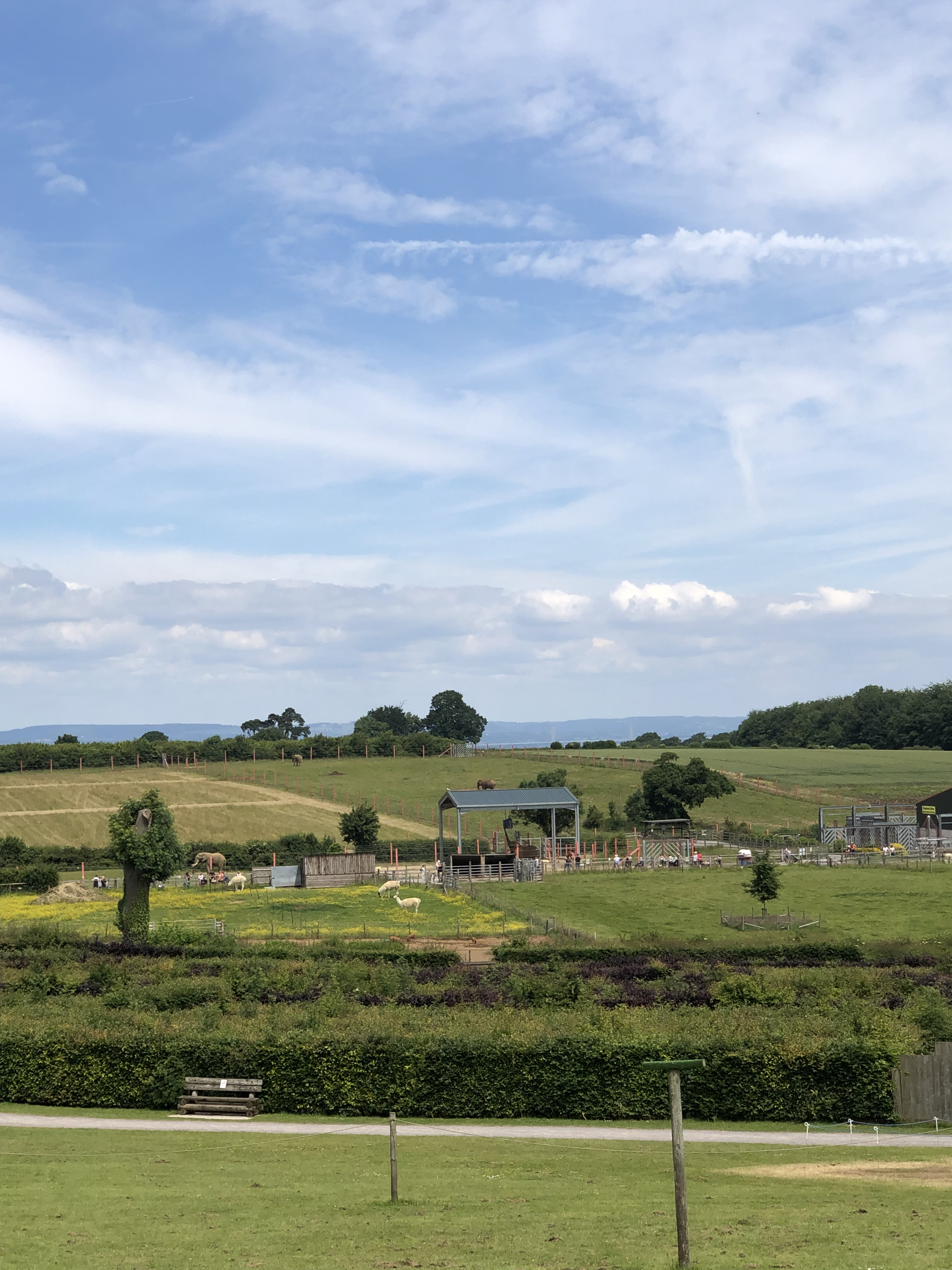
Elephant fields seen from flying fields at Noah's Ark

== Conservation programmes ==
In 2015, Noah's Ark joined the European Endangered Species Programme (EEP), which oversees management and conservation of protected species. The zoo currently participates in four EEPs: African Elephants, Spectacled Bears, Siamang Gibbons, and White-Headed Vultures. Noah's Ark is also involved in European Studbooks, for the Cotton-Top Tamarin and the Asian Box Turtle.

The EEP for African Elephants at Noah's Ark is a bachelor programme, wherein only males of the species inhabit the enclosure, to provide a home while waiting for a breeding opportunity. In September 2012, the zoo began building an elephant sanctuary of 20 acres (8.1 ha); the first elephant arrived in February 2014. Before construction of the sanctuary the Born Free Foundation, which opposes holding elephants in captivity, said the acreage was too small for the purpose. The enclosure consists of a 1,080 m^{2} (11,600 ft^{2}) area where the elephants can sleep or shelter from the rain, and a 19.5 acres (7.9 ha) outdoor area with a 9 ft (2.7 m) heated swimming pool. The £1.8m development was partly funded by the European Agricultural Fund for Rural Development and uses solar PV, biomass heating, and rainwater harvesting to provide nearly all power needed to operate the enclosure. An adjacent farm provides most of the food for the elephants.

NAZF is the second zoo in the UK to have a Rare Breeds accreditation for farm species: it has 'Approved Associate' status from BIAZA.

The zoo calls itself a "sustainable zoo", as, using wind turbines, biomass boilers, and solar panels, over half its consumed energy is renewably produced in-house. A Christmas tree recycling service provides residents across North Somerset the opportunity to give their used trees to the animals for enrichment.

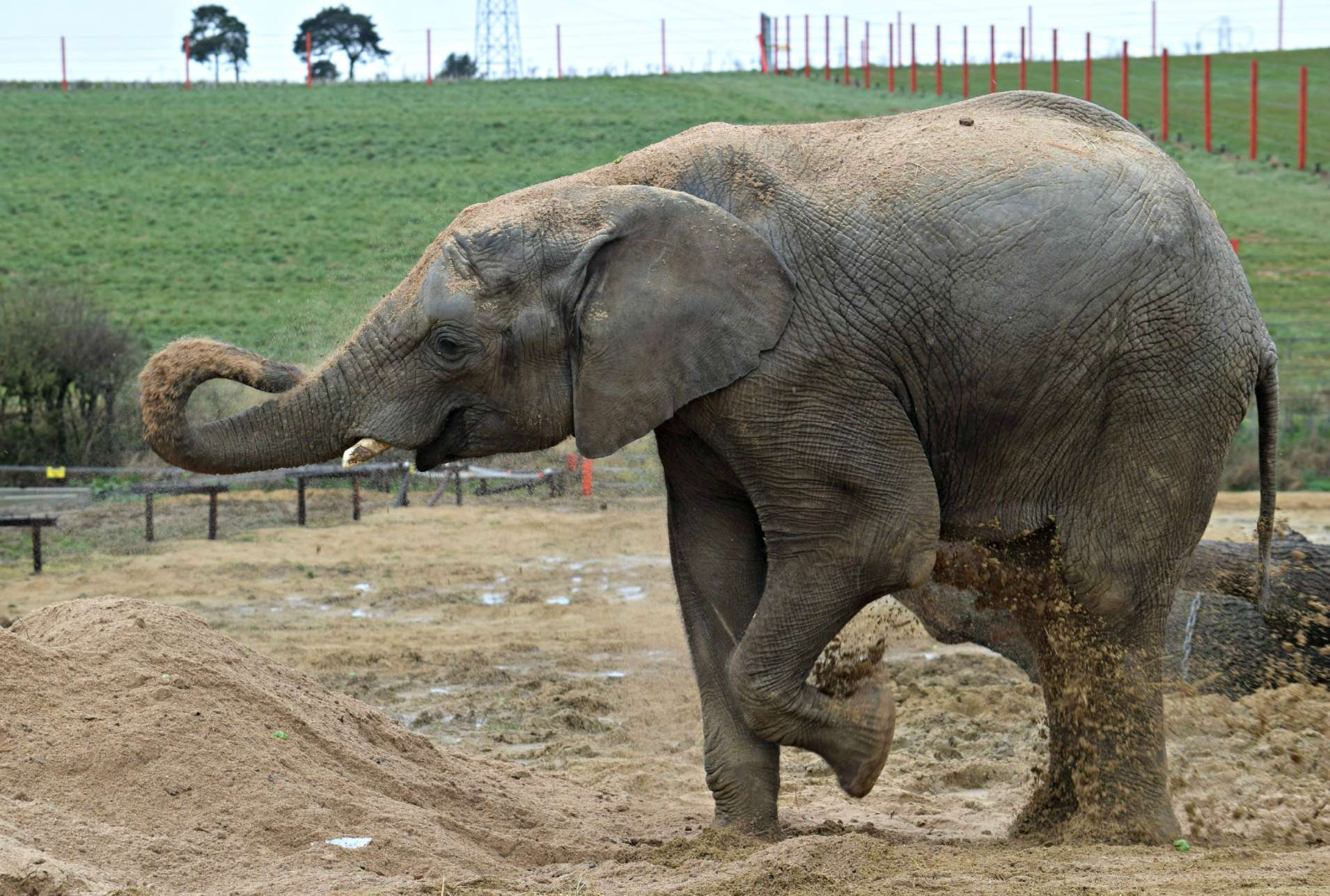
An elephant at the zoo

== Animal exhibits ==
Africa
The first animals arrived in the African section in 2005: two South African white rhinos. A Giraffe House opened in 2006, two African lions joined the Big Cat Sanctuary in 2010, and Elephant Eden introduced its first African elephant in 2014. In 2015, Noah's Ark included four giraffes (two of which were born at NAZF), four lions, two African elephants, two white rhinos, two zebras, and a family of meerkats. In 2020, Hope, an 8-month old zebra, died when she was startled by fireworks and collided with the gates of her enclosure. in June 2021, an African elephant was fatally attacked by another elephant.
Asia

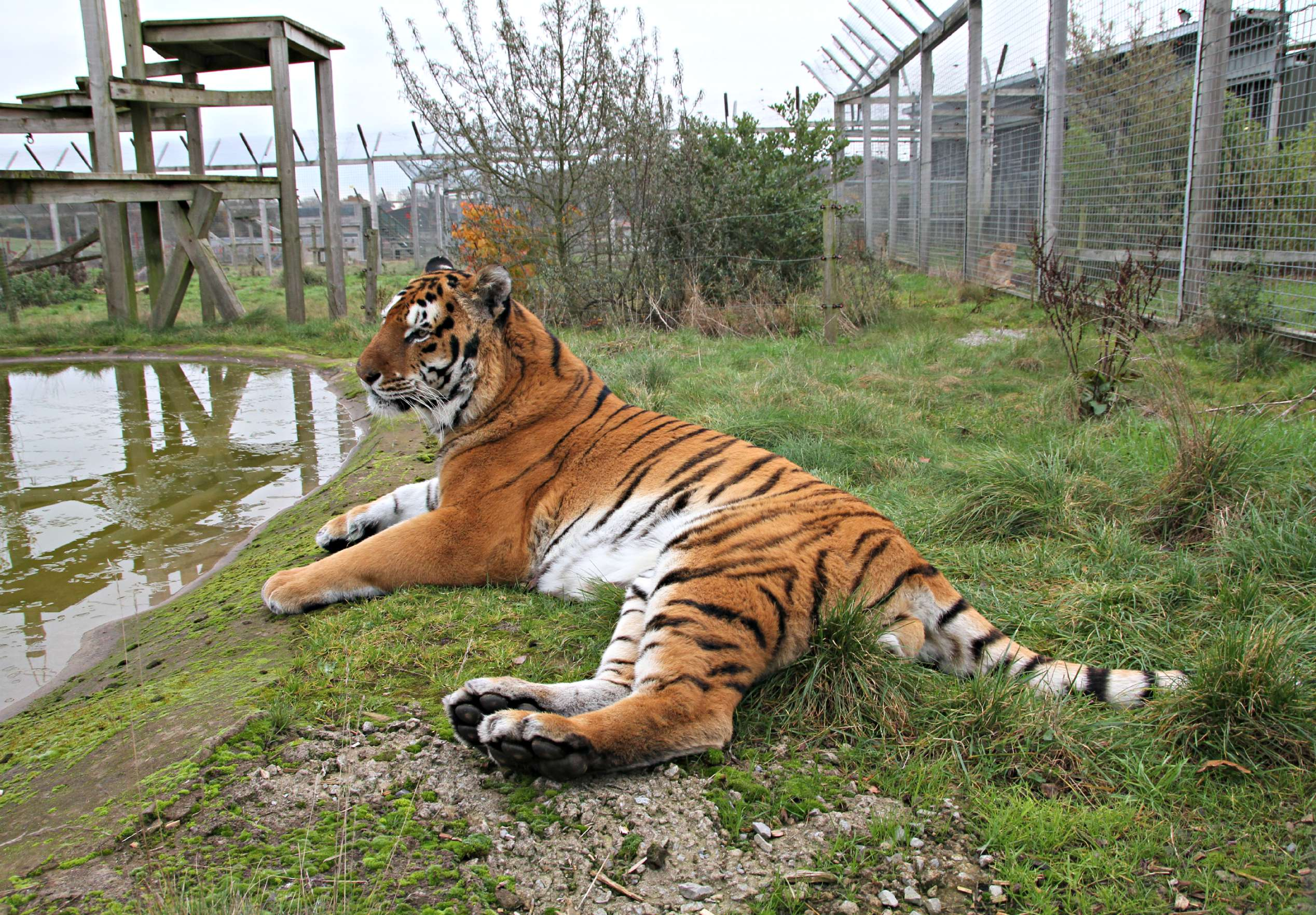
Tiger enclosure, 2

In 2009, Noah's Ark introduced two Bengal tigers to the newly built 'Tiger Territory', which later became the 'Big Cat Sanctuary'. Noah's Ark Asian section is also home to yaks, water buffalo, and two Bactrian camels.
Primates
Noah's Ark is home to five primate species: Siamang Gibbons, black & white ruffed lemurs, ring tailed lemurs, marmosets and cotton-top tamarins. Three of the five primates (ruffed lemurs, tamarins and gibbons) are listed on the IUCN red list as either endangered or critically endangered. The primate section has successfully bred animals since its opening, most recently a baby Siamang gibbon. (The gibbons were moved to Noah's Ark as part of the European Endangered Species Programme in 2007.)
Reptiles
In July 2017 the zoo introduced seven Aldabra giant tortoises to the zoo on loan from Nigel Marven. The tortoise enclosure won an award from BIAZA for enclosure design.
