= Martin Lacey Jr. =

British animal trainer

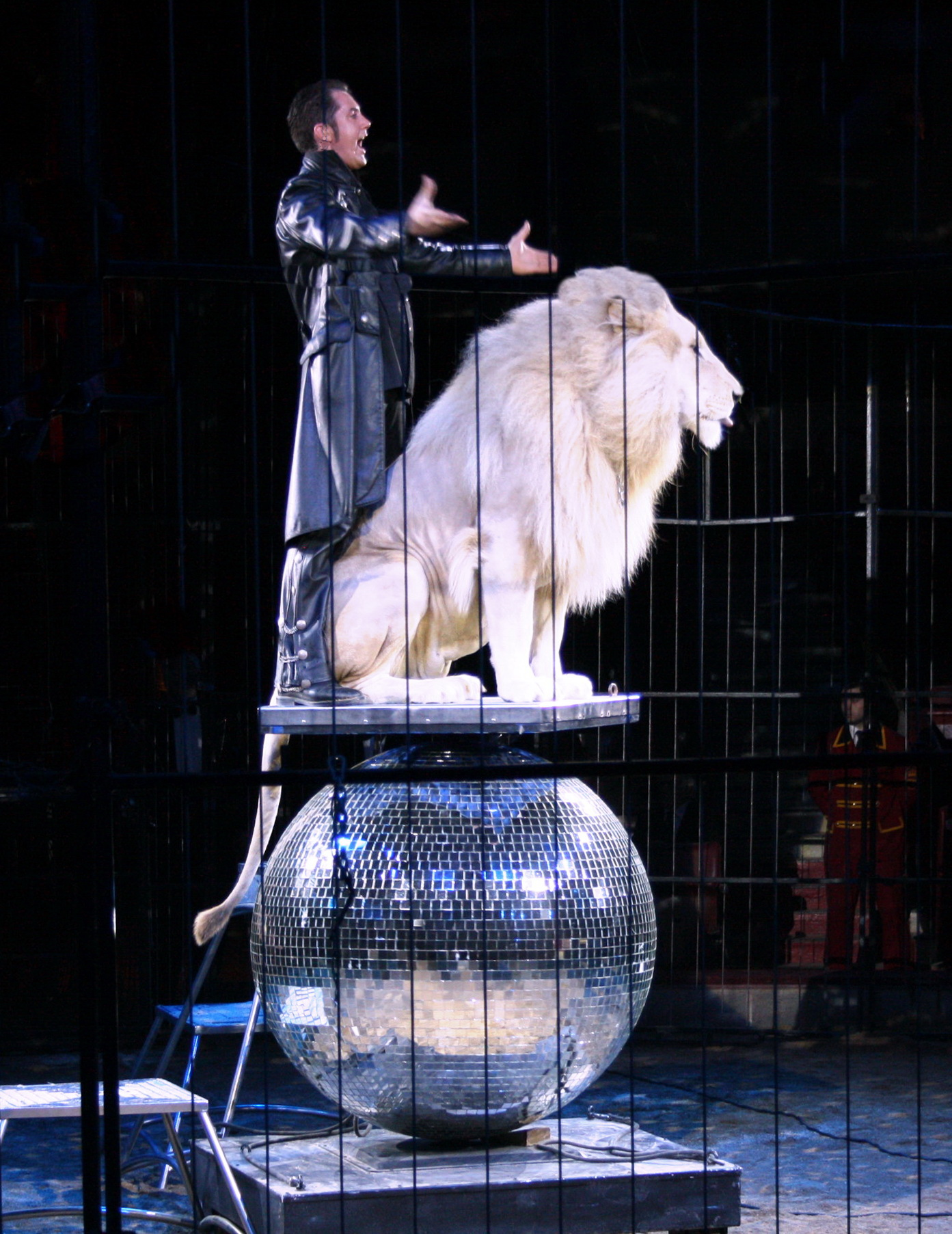
Martin Lacey jr. and his white lion King Tonga

Martin Lacey Jr. (born 8 June 1977) is an English circus performer and trainer of wild animals who has achieved fame in Germany. He is the son of Martin Lacey, the circus ringmaster and animal trainer who bred most of the tigers used in the Esso television advertisements in the 1970s.

== Professional life ==
Lacey is the director of predatory animals at Circus Krone, the largest circus organisation in Europe. As well as lions, he also works with a rhinoceros.

In 2004 he performed in the German television series Anke Late Night. He has frequently appeared on German news and entertainment television shows.

== Awards ==
Lacey's performances with wild animals have won him various circus awards:

- Golden Crystal, Animal Trainer Circus Festival, Massy (1999)
- Silver Clown award, International Circus Festival of Monte-Carlo (2000)
- Gold Star, International Circus Festival, Grenoble (2004)
- Golden Clown award, International Circus Festival of Monte-Carlo (2010 and 2019)

== Media coverage ==
In 2008, Indian newspaper The Tribune reported that Lacey was hand-rearing three lion cubs at Circus Krone, as their mother Ruth was unable to provide enough milk.

== Personal life ==
His father, Martin Lacey, is director of the Great British Circus. His mother, Susan Lacey, is a retired animal trainer who performed in the circus industry for many years. He has two brothers’: Alexander, who also works as an animal trainer and performer, and Richard. Martin Lacey Jr. is married to Jana Mandana Lacey-Krone and has a son, Alexis Henry Lacey-Krone.
