= Blight (surname) =

Blight is an English surname. Notable people with this surname include:

== People with the surname ==
- David W. Blight (born 1949), American historian
- Digby Blight (born 1931), former Director of Premier and Cabinet, Western Australia
- Ellen Blight (1833/1834–1850), English lion-tamer killed by a tiger
- John Blight (1913–1995), Australian poet of Cornish ancestry
- John Thomas Blight (1835–1911), Cornish archaeological artist
- Malcolm Blight (born 1950), former Australian rules footballer
- Rick Blight (1955–2005), Canadian hockey player
- Vicki Blight (born 1981), British radio DJ

== Fictional characters ==
- Dr. Blight, a villain in the animated series Captain Planet and the Planeteers
- Amity Blight, character in The Owl House
