= Thomas Macarte =

Circus lion-tamer killed in the ring (c. 1839–1872)

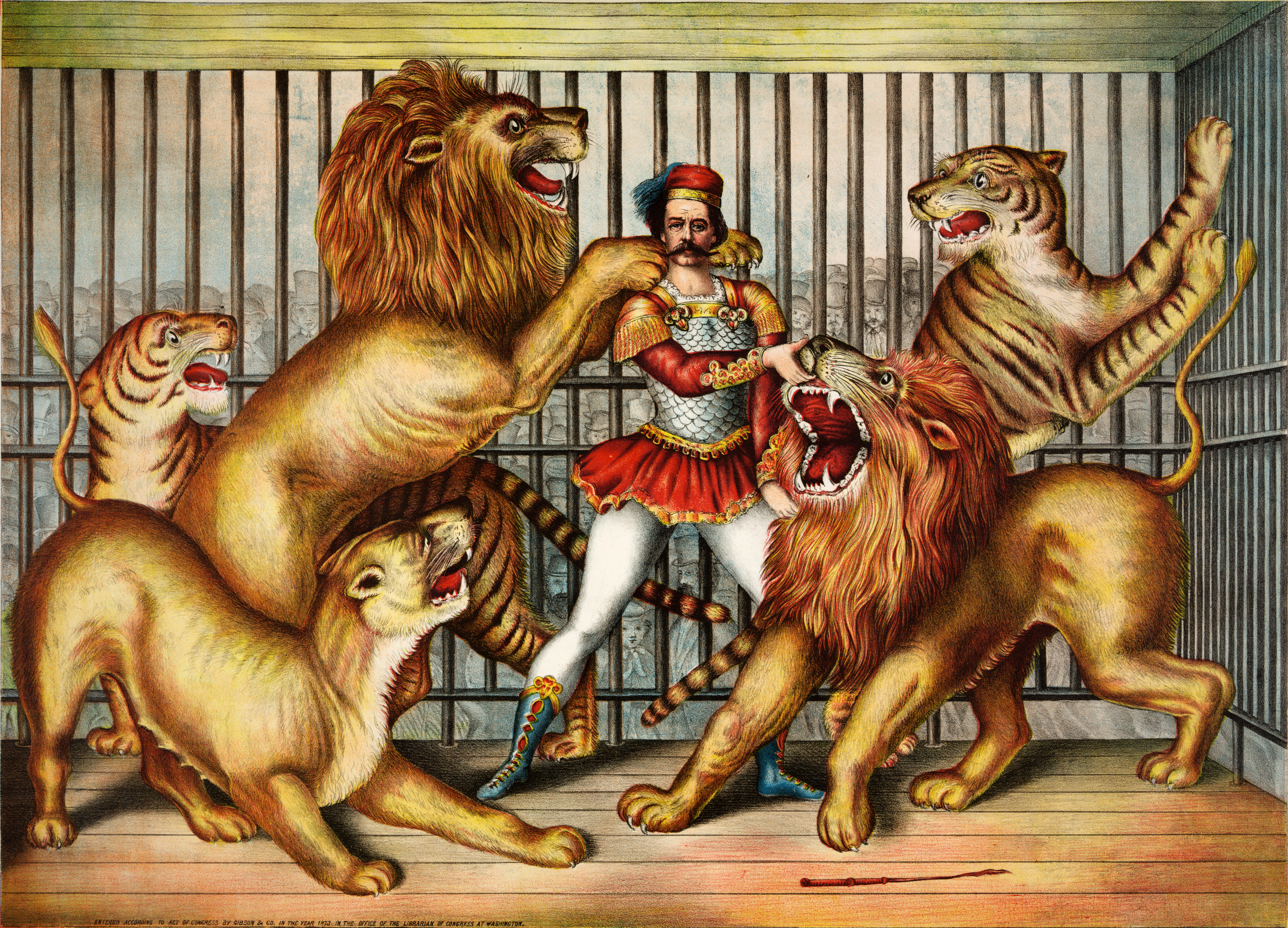
A lion-tamer (1873)

Thomas Macarte (c. 1839 – January 3, 1872) was a one-armed lion tamer who as Massarti the Lion-Tamer was attacked and killed during a circus performance in Bolton in Lancashire.

== Early career ==
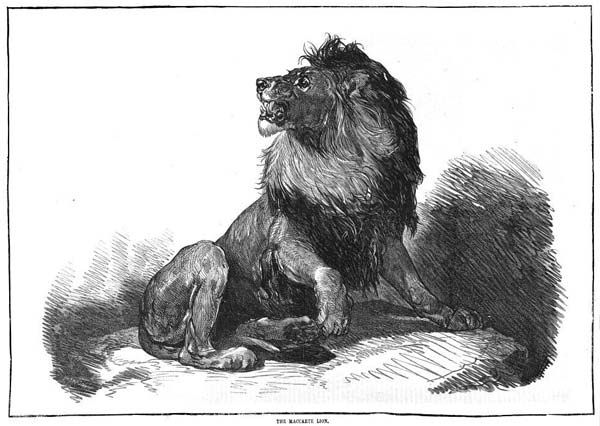
The 'Macarte Lion' in 1874 - The Illustrated London News

Thomas Macarte was born in Cork in Ireland in about 1839. He was married but had no children. There are claims that he was a member of the famous Macarte family of circus and music hall entertainers that included the equestrienne Marie Macarte and the high-wire act Macarte Sisters, but this cannot be verified. He had worked in menageries for much of his adult life including with the circus of Messrs. Bell and Myers and the American Hippodrome Circus before joining Manders’ Menagerie as Massarti the Lion-Tamer after the death of the famous lion tamer Maccomo in January 1871.

On 20 November 1862 Macarte was working with lions as an assistant to Alfred Moffat of the American Hippodrome Circus. While the circus was performing in Liverpool Macarte was walking past the lion cage when a lioness seized him by the left forearm, causing such severe damage it had to be amputated. Perhaps as a result of this attack, Macarte did not always feel comfortable working with big cats and on occasion was known to imbibe hard spirits before a performance for a little "Dutch courage".

== Mander's Menagerie ==
As Maccomo's successor at Mander's Menagerie, Macarte's act was expected to be as thrilling as his predecessor's. Being new to Mander's he was not permitted to work with the tigers but immediately commenced working with the lions. However, despite his undoubted expertise Macarte was nervous around big cats and in addition had a habit of turning his back on them in the ring, leading to his being described as a "very bold and adventurous man [who] had been frequently cautioned respecting his rashness". Despite having been warned of the dangers this practice risked he continued to do so in his act which may have contributed to his death during his final performance. His wife later testified at the inquest that on the day of his death he had left her at about 2:00 p.m. and had not come back for his tea. One of the lions in his act had bitten Macarte earlier in the week and he confided to his wife that he was afraid of the animal. After his death this lion would become known as 'Macarte's Lion'. His wife related to the coroner that at the time he had left her that afternoon he had been sober, but it was alleged by others that he may have had a few drinks before the evening's performance so that by the time he entered the ring in his Roman gladiator costume he was unsteady.

== Death in the ring ==
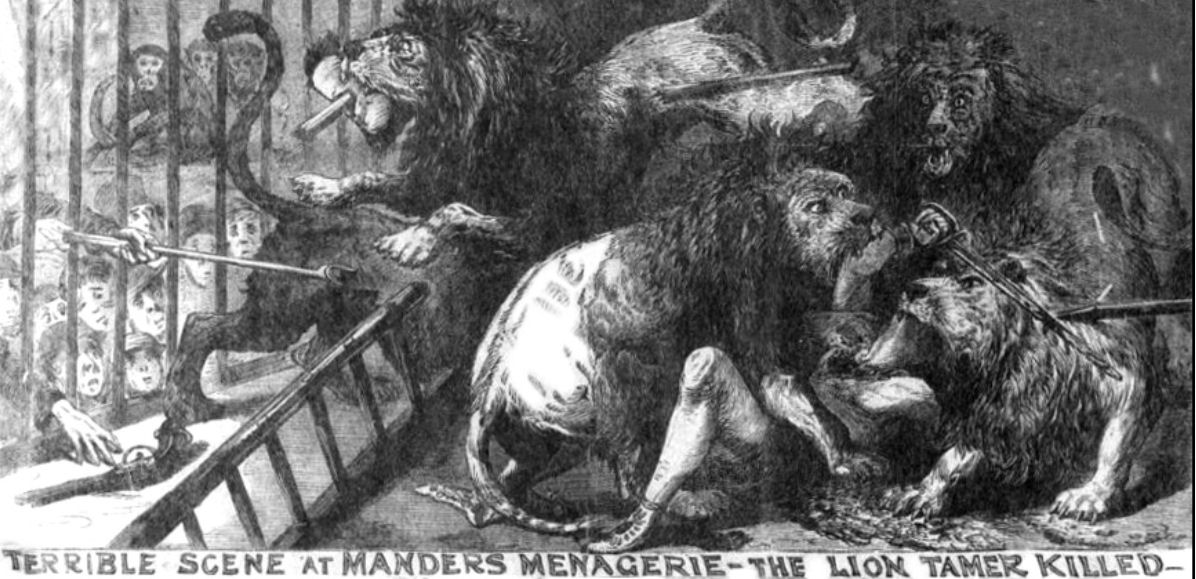
'Terrible Scene in Manders' Menagerie - A Lion Tamer Killed' - The Illustrated Police News (1872)

On the evening of 3 January 1872 Macarte was due to perform before a crowd of about 500 people for Manders’ Menagerie in the marketplace at Bolton in Lancashire. After giving his usual talk about the big cats to the audience Macarte stepped into the cage, where he was attacked by the lions, which he attempted to fight off with his sword and a pistol loaded with blanks but they overcame him. A reporter for the Manchester Evening News described the attack:

A very shocking affair took place last night in Bolton ... Part of the performance consists of a 'lion hunt,' during the course of which five large lions are put through a variety of movements by a man, dressed in a French uniform [sic], whose name is given in the bills as 'Massarti', but whose real name is Thomas Macarte... Last night, about half-past ten o’clock, the last representation in connection with the 'farewell visit' of the establishment was given, and during its progression Macarte slipped and fell to the floor while engaged in a large cage with the five full grown lions. One of the largest of the animals, a black Barbary lion, immediately sprang upon him with a terrific roar and was quickly followed by its companions. A horrible scene ensued. Within the den a frightful tragedy was enacted, the cries of the unhappy man struggling in the fangs of the savage brutes, being scarcely heard amid their roaring. Outside the cage a scene scarcely less appalling was witnessed. In the large assemblage of visitors, stalwart men shrieked, women tore their hair and fainted, and many were unable to seek their homes until a considerable time had elapsed. Macarte was rescued from the lions as quickly as possible but ere this could be done he was frightful torn by their teeth and claws, his legs, head, and hands being lacerated to such a degree that the flesh was completely torn away from the bones.

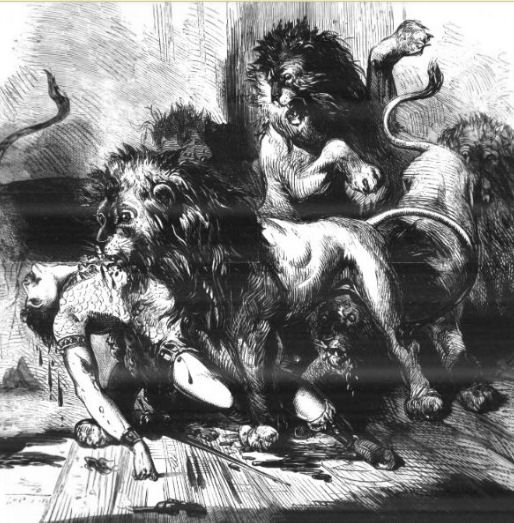
The attack on Massarti the Lion-Tamer (1872)

It was common practice to have heated irons ready to drive back the lions in case of just such an incident, but on this occasion this had been overlooked because it was an 'extra performance' not on the daily schedule and by the time they were heated it was too late. Other members of the show eventually forced the animals back into an inner cage but they dragged Macarte with them. Eventually rescued after a quarter of an hour of being mauled, he said "I am done for". He died on the way to the hospital.

Thomas Macarte was buried in the Roman Catholic section of Tonge Cemetery in Bolton on 6 January 1872. In July of that year Mrs Rosina Manders, the owner of the Manders’ Menagerie since the death of her husband in 1871, paid for a monument of a white marble cross nearly three feet high placed on a slab of white marble standing on two larger blocks of granite. The inscription reads:

In memory of the great Lion Tamer, Thomas Maccarte, aged 34, killed at Bolton, Jan. 3rd, 1872, by the lions in Manders’ Star Menagerie. Erected to the memory of an old and faithful servant by Mrs. Rosina Manders, sole proprietress of the Grand National Star Menagerie. ‘When thou hearest of a fellow mortal being suddenly plunged into eternity, think of the mercy that has spared thee.’

== Macarte's Lion ==
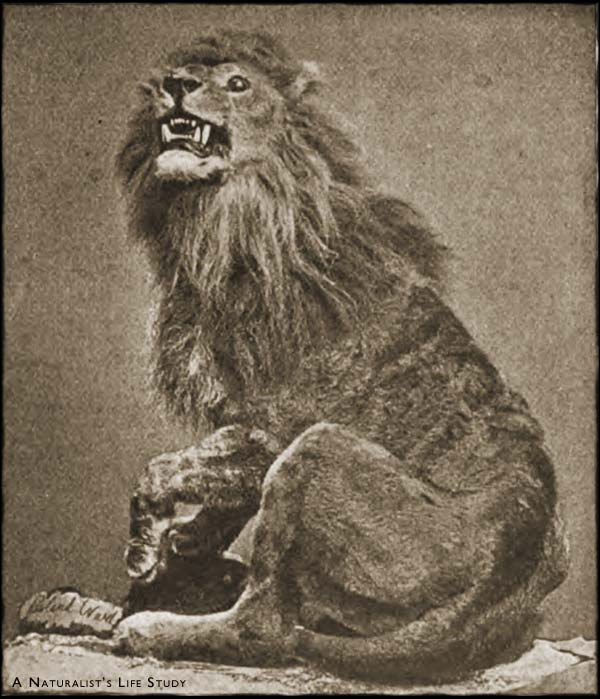
The 'Macarte Lion' as mounted by taxidermist Rowland Ward in 1874

After the fatal attack the Silver Mane or African lion, or the 'Macarte Lion', as it became known, became something of a cause célèbre. It died a natural death in January 1874 with the wounds still visible from the attack of two years earlier. It was stuffed and mounted by the noted taxidermist Rowland Ward as 'A Wounded Lion' and placed on display in the window of Ward and Co.'s in Piccadilly in London, where it attracted much interest from passersby. Illustrations of the lion were reproduced in The Illustrated London News and The Illustrated Sporting and Dramatic News in addition to a photograph in Ward's A Naturalist's Life Study in the Art of Taxidermy (1913).
