= Martin Lacey =

British circus ringmaster and animal trainer (born 1947)

Martin Lacey (born 1947) is a circus ringmaster, company director and trainer of wild animals. He trained most of the tigers that were used in the Esso television advertisements in the 1970s.

== Professional life ==
He has been breeding and training animals including lions, tigers and elephants for over forty years. He is a Government Registered Wild Animal Trainer.

In his heyday he appeared in UK television variety shows and was known as the "King Of The Cage" and "the Man Fear Forgot". He provided most of the tigers used in the Esso oil television advertisements up until the 1970s. However, changes in public attitudes to performing animals mean that he has faced criticism in recent years.

A book detailing his life was published in 2009: My Life With Lions.

== Companies ==
He is the owner of the Great British Circus company that, unusually for the UK, organises circuses with live wild animals including tigers, camels and elephants. He is also a director of Linctrek Ltd, a company which provides trained animals for films, television, commercials and zoos.

== Use of wild animals ==
His use of wild animals has attracted considerable criticism and protests. However, he defends his company's approach as follows: "The Circus takes veterinary advice from world-respected experts, not from campaign groups who too often seek to excite public sympathy in their quest for donations and support.".

== BBC investigation into links with Noah's Ark Zoo Farm ==
In October 2009 it was claimed by the BBC and the Captive Animals Protection Society that many of the animals at Noah's Ark Zoo Farm near Bristol, including tigers and camels were owned by Lacey's Great British Circus company, and the owners had been keeping the arrangement secret from visitors and from the British and Irish Association of Zoos and Aquariums (BIAZA). The zoo denied the claims, stating "We do not hold Circus Tigers here at the Zoo. Our tigers come from Linctrek Ltd., based in North West England, and do not belong to the Great British Circus, contrary to claims made".

== Personal life ==
He lives at Keal Cotes in Lincolnshire. His wife Susan, also a circus performer and animal trainer, is now retired. He has four sons, Edward Lacey, Alex Lacey and Martin Lacey, Jr. who are animal trainers except for Edward who died in 2008 at the age of 35, and Richard, who does not work in the circus industry. After retiring from the big top, Lacey was circus consultant for Billi Smiles Circus.
