= Irina Bugrimova =

Russian circus performer

- Ирина Бугримова
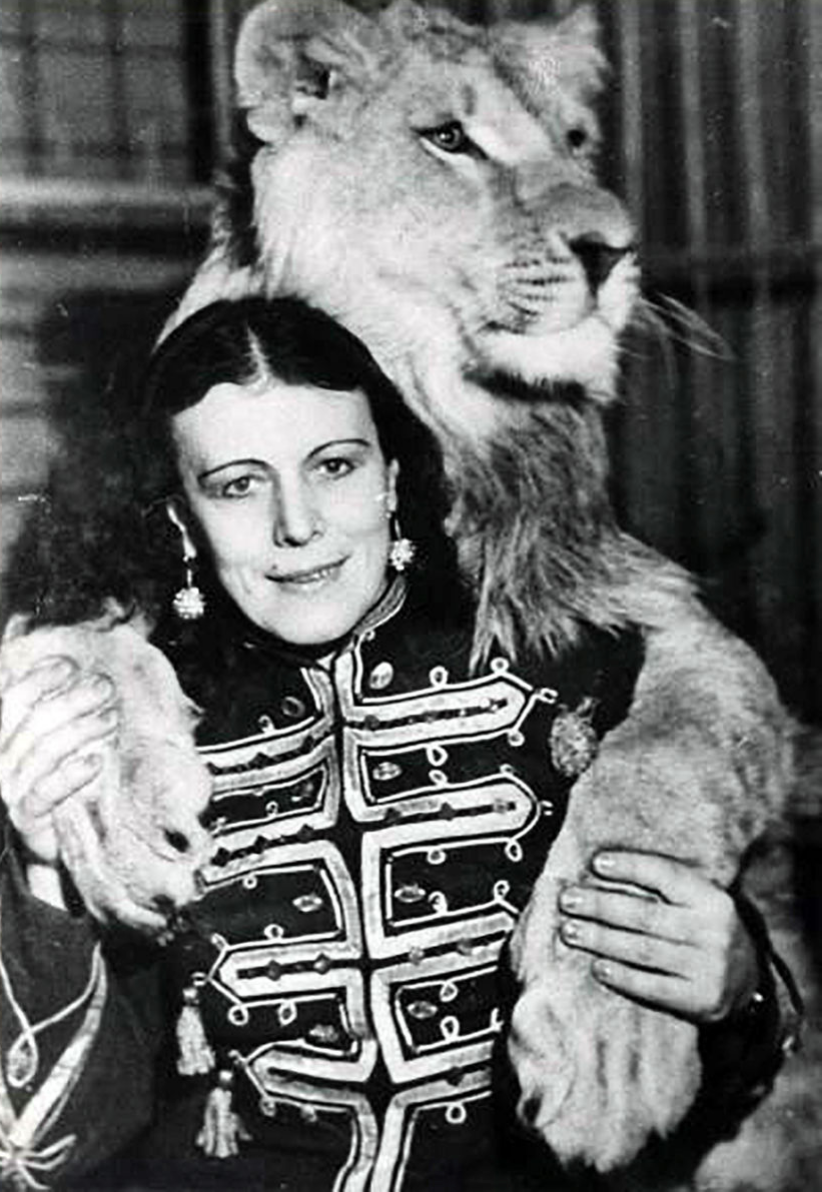
- Born: March 13, 1910; Kharkiv, Russian Empire (present-day Ukraine)
- Died: February 20, 2001 (aged 90); Moscow, Russia
- Other name: Irina Nikolayevna Bugrimova-Buslayeva
- Occupation: Lion taming

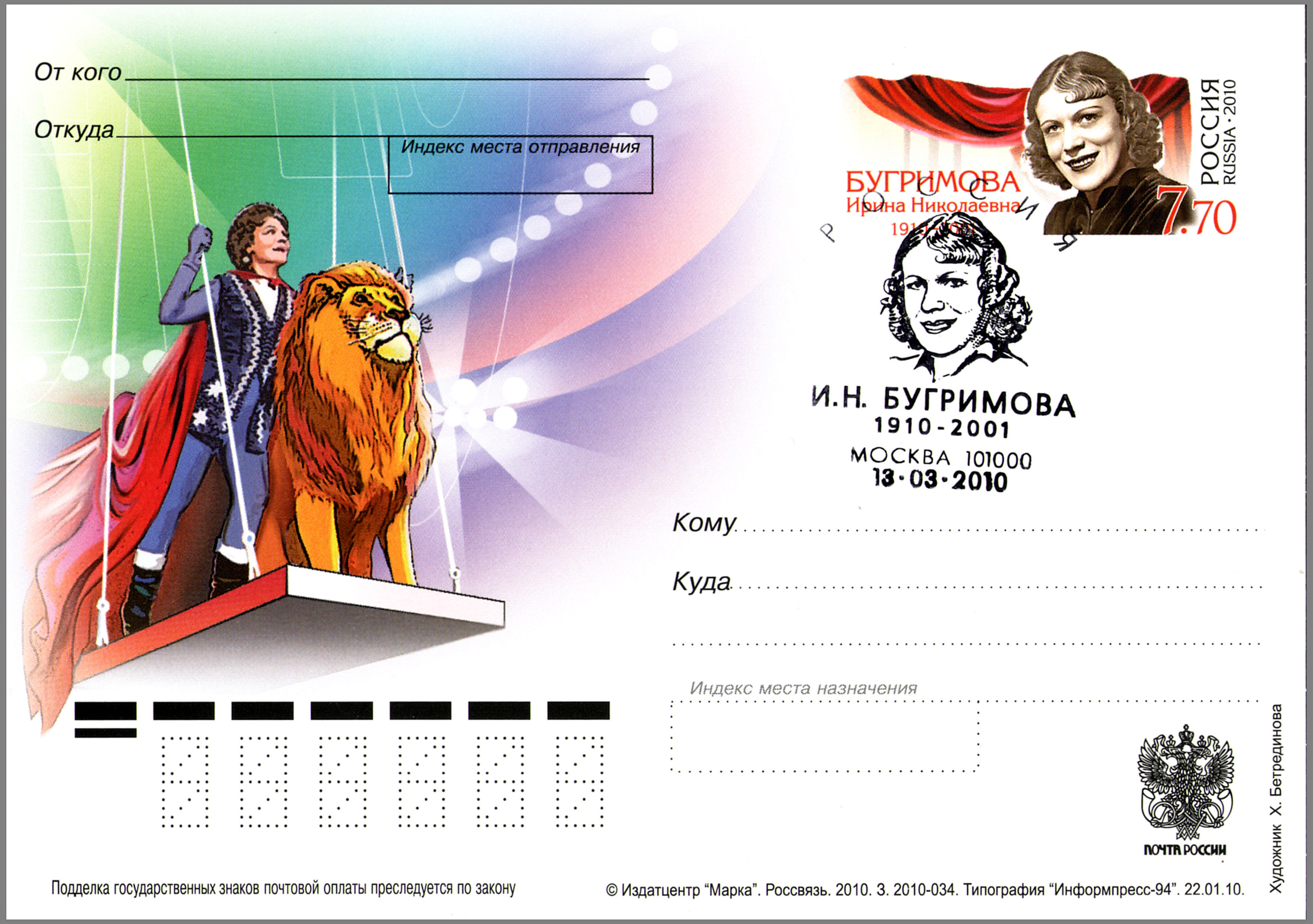
Postal card commemorating centennial of Bugrimova's birth

Irina Nikolayevna Bugrimova-Buslayeva (Note: Russian: Ирина Николаевна Бугримова-Буслаева, romanized: Irina Nikolayevna Bugrimova-Buslayeva) (née Bugrimova; March 13, 1910 – February 20, 2001) was the first female lion tamer in the Soviet Union. Called a "circus legend" by sources such as the BBC, Bugrimova was the first woman in Russia and the then-Soviet Union to work with lions, tigers, and ligers in a variety of performing acts, and trained more than 70 big cats during her career.

== Early life ==
Irina Bugrimova was born in Kharkiv, Russian Empire (now Ukraine) on March 13, 1910. The daughter of a veterinarian and a ballet dancer, she excelled in athletics as a child, including as a champion speed skater. She eventually parlayed her talent into a career as a motorcyclist and gymnast at circuses, among other things.

== Circus career ==
In 1929, Bugrimova transferred to the Moscow State Circus, and it was there she met the animal trainers Nikolai Gladilshchikov and Boris Eder, who taught her the practice. She made her debut ten years later in 1939, and designed many of her own tricks, such as lions tightrope walking, acts involving motorcycles, and a giant swing which she would leap from with a cat. In one stunt, a lion would run in front of her motorcycle as if in fear, while another would jump onto the back of her seat to ride along. She flirted with danger by swinging on a giant swing with a lion. At the end of the routine the two jumped off the swing together and she fed the animal a piece of meat with her teeth. Her act ended with the lions laying down as she cavorted on a carpet of cats. Later she worked with the Circus Humberto in Czechoslovakia and the East German Circus.

Bugrimova performed in circuses well into her 60s, and was decorated several times by the Soviet state. She died in Moscow. Today there is also an avenue named in her honor in her hometown of Kharkiv, in front of the city's circus.

== See also ==
- Mabel Stark
