= Martini Maccomo =

Lion tamer

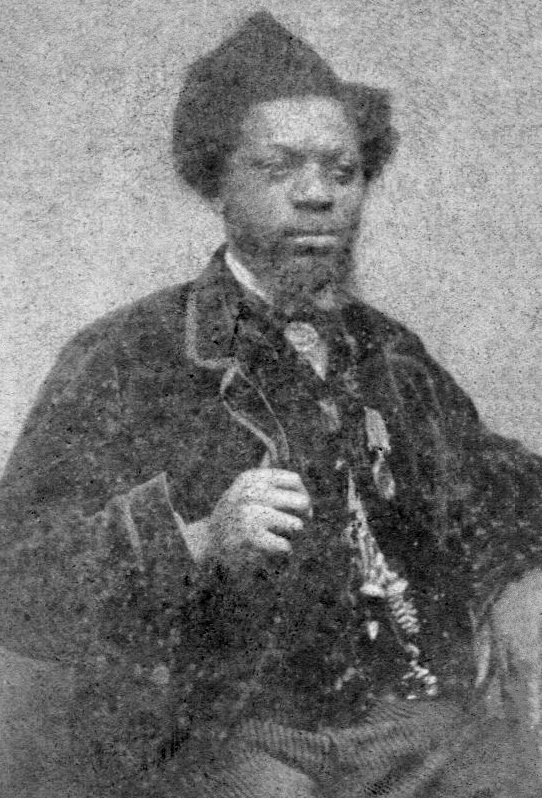
- Photograph of Maccomo
- Born: Between 1835 and 1840; Portuguese Angola (reputedly)
- Died: 11 January 1871; Sunderland, England
- Occupation: Lion tamer

Martini Maccomo (died 11 January 1871) was a lion tamer in Victorian Britain. He performed with William Manders' menagerie from around 1854 and remained the group's key attraction until his death. His act involved pursuing lions and tigers around a cage utilising whips, pistols and knuckledusters. The performances were renowned for their danger, and attacks on Maccomo by the animals were often reported on in newspapers. He was portrayed as a noble savage with stereotypical "African" dress, although he later moved away from this characterization. He was known for his coolness of nerve in the ring and his mild-mannered nature outside it. Maccomo died in Sunderland in 1871.

== Biography ==
=== Early life ===
Maccomo is recorded as being born in Angola, although he was also reported as being either born Arthur Williams from the West Indies, as previously being a sailor born in Liverpool, or a Zulu. His year of birth is unclear as his death certificate gives his age as 35, his gravestone claims 32, his age in the 1861 census gives his age as 25, and his death notice in the York Herald states he was 31, thus placing his birth year between about 1835 and 1840.

=== Career ===
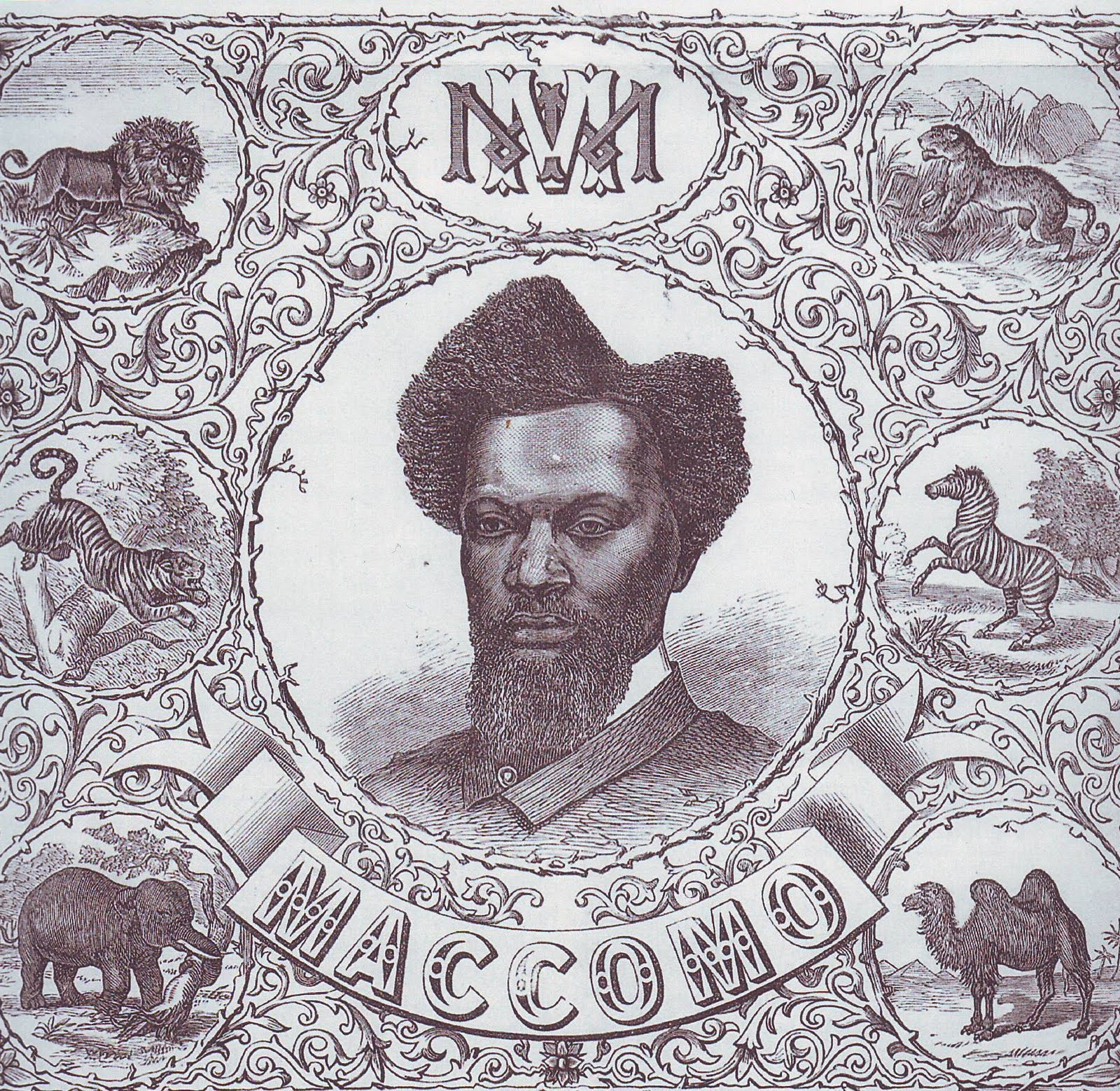
Illustration of Maccomo from 1870.

Maccomo was one of the first recorded black lion tamers in Britain. His origins as a lion tamer are somewhat uncertain. It is known that Maccomo worked with Hytlon's Menagerie in 1853 and had joined William Manders' Royal Menagerie (also known as the Grand National Mammoth Menagerie) by 1854. At this point, Manders' menagerie were touring Ireland and Maccomo was referred to in advertising as the 'Lion King' and 'Lion Hunter'. The writer Thomas Frost wrote an account of Maccomo's first meeting with William Manders in Circus Life and Circus Celebrities (1876). He wrote that Maccomo approached the menagerie at Greenwich fair, claiming he was a sailor who was interested in working with the animals. Frost wrote that Manders gave Maccomo the chance to prove himself in the lion's cage, "and displayed so much courage and address in putting the animals through their performances that he was engaged forthwith". The writer Archibald Forbes, in his 1872 book Soldiering and Scribbling, wrote that there were two Maccomos; the first was a man called Jemmy Strand who owned a gingerbread stand and volunteered to perform with Hylton's Menagerie shortly after the usual lion tamer did not show up. The menagerie manager gave Strand the name "Maccomo". When William Manders took over the Hylton menagerie and saw Martini Maccomo perform, Strand lost his position and his name was transferred to Martini. After the 1854 Manders' Royal Menagerie tour, Maccomo may have left the group before returning with a show in Chesterfield in 1857. Historian Steve Ward writes a possible reason for Maccomo's absence might have been because he was sourcing animals for his shows. Martini performed with Manders' menagerie from late 1857 and was its key attraction.

The danger of Maccomo's performances—especially the fact that he might be injured—attracted audiences to see him. Various animal attacks on Maccomo and other instances regarding his performances were reported on in newspapers. While performing at Great Yarmouth in January 1860, Maccomo accidentally fired one of his pistols into the audience during his "Lion Hunt" act. A piece of wadding became lodged in the eye of a local builder named Gillings, who subsequently lost sight in that eye. In the resulting case of Gillings v. Manders, the plaintiff was awarded £150 in damages (equivalent to £19,700 in 2023). During a show at Shaw's Brow, Liverpool in 1861, Maccomo's hand became wedged in the mouth of a Bengal tigress. It was freed around five minutes later when one of the keepers pressed a hot iron bar against her teeth, causing the tigress to recoil and release Maccomo's hand, which had been lacerated. Such spectacles were expected by the audience; one man gave 10 shillings to Maccomo in recognition of his bravery. In 1862, Maccomo performed in Norwich where his show consisted of him pursuing lions and tigers with a whip and firearm. During the show, a young lion bit Maccamo's hand and dragged him across the floor. As a result, part of the bone of his index finger had to be removed. Maccomo was attacked again by a Bengal tiger whilst performing in Dalkeith in 1866. A contemporary news story reported that his injuries "were merely of a superficial nature". In February 1866, Maccomo was awarded a gold medal by Manders during a presentation at Joseph Battley's Lodge-Lane Hotel in Liverpool. The inscription on the medal read "Martini Maccomo, 1866. Presented by Williams Manders, Esq., as a reward for bravery, courtesy, and integrity".

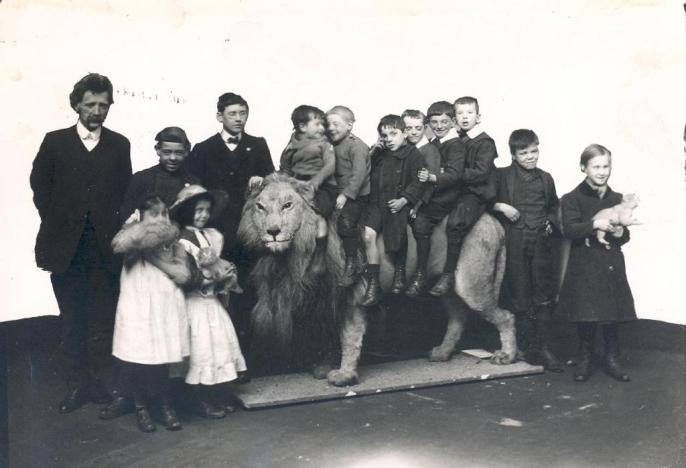
Photograph of blind children and the now stuffed Wallace the Lion, which attacked Maccomo in 1869.

Whilst performing in Sunderland in 1869, Maccomo was attacked by a maneless lion known as Wallace and was only able to escape its grip by using his brass knuckles. Wallace died in 1875 in Warrington and was taxidermied by William Yellowby—a taxidermist based in South Shields. The lion was bought by Sunderland Museum in 1879, where it has been displayed ever since.

=== Death ===
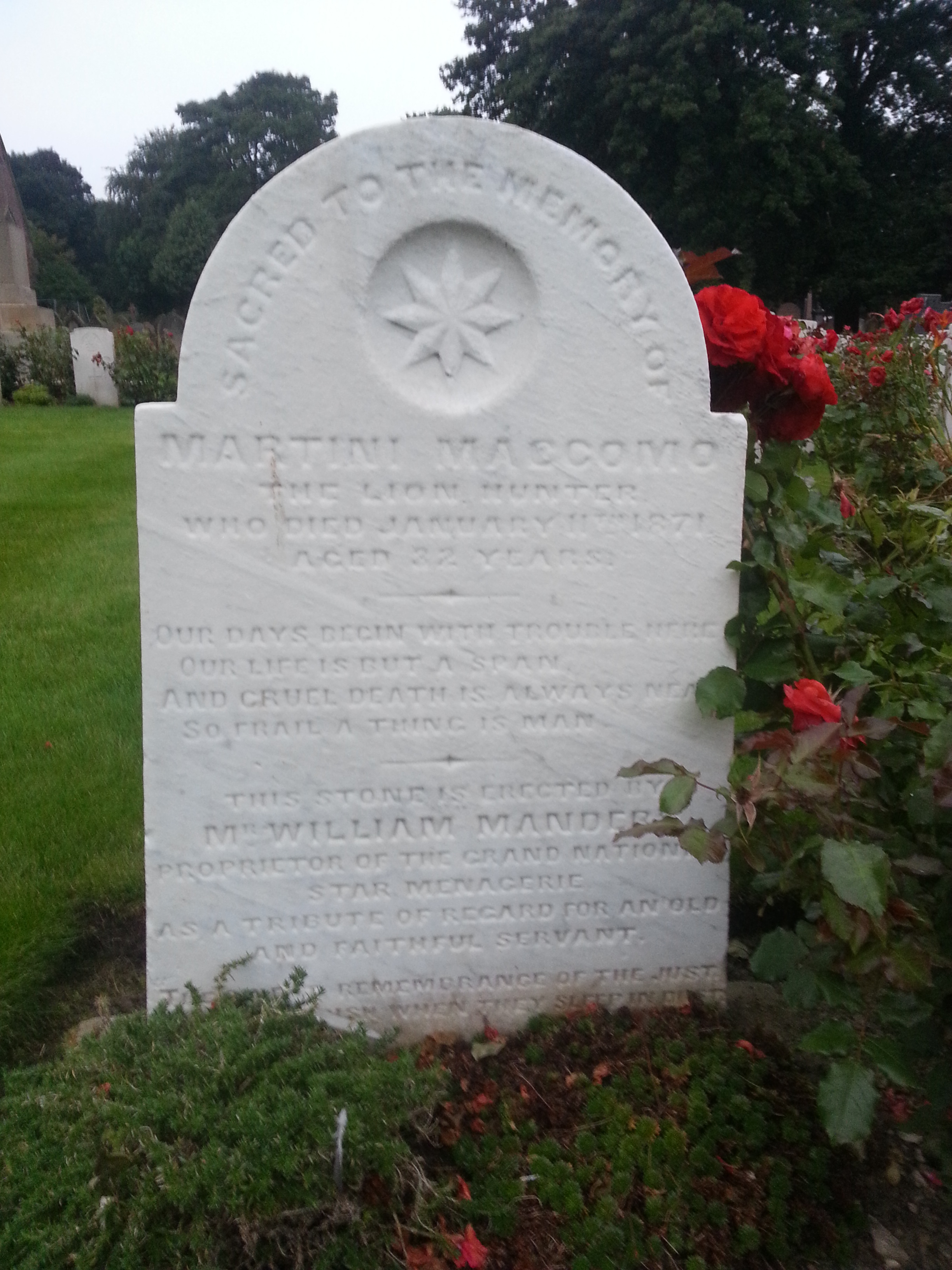
Maccomo's grave in Bishopwearmouth Cemetery

Maccomo was staying in The Palatine Hotel in Sunderland where he died of rheumatic fever on 11 January 1871. According to the death certificate, he died age 35, but according to his death notice he was 31. His name, too, was recorded differently as "Martino". Maccomo's death came unexpectedly—he was due to perform with Manders' Menagerie on the day he died. He was buried in nearby Bishopwearmouth Cemetery and his gravestone was erected by Manders. The grave now lies amongst the Commonwealth War Graves section. He was succeeded at Manders' Menagerie by Thomas Macarte, who would be killed in the ring in January 1872.

== Style and character ==
Advertisements for Manders' shows were put in national newspapers, where Maccomo was given such names as "the African Wild Beast Tamer", "Angola's Mighty Czar of All Lion Tamers", "the Black Diamond of Manders' Menagerie", "the Dark Pearl of Great Price", "the most talented and renowned Sable Artiste in Christendom" and "The Hero of a Thousand Combats". Maccomo's outfits when performing exemplified the idea of the "noble savage"; a contemporary illustration from 1860 depicts him stylised in a stereotypical "African" way—different from that of the white lion-tamers of the time, who tended to embody imperialism by wearing military clothing. Maccomo eventually moved away from his African characterisation, abandoning a tunic and headdress to wear a suit and gold watch. Maccomo's fame led to a prevalence of impersonators who tended to opt for the stereotypical African style. His success resulted in lion tamers becoming a staple of menageries in Great Britain.

Maccomo was described as being cool in the face of danger and did not make it clear to the audience if he was in peril or in pain. The politician and lion tamer John S. Clarke described him as one "of the most intrepid men who ever performed with wild animals", with successive lion tamers lacking his "coolness and nerve." Maccomo was known for being teetotal and for being calm and pleasant outside the ring. His obituary states that "His quiet, inoffensive disposition had gained him many true friends, a few of whom were around him as he breathed his last". In 1871, Archibald Forbes wrote of him: "Maccomo was the most daring man among lions and tigers I ever saw. At first he never drank anything stronger than coffee, but he always believed he would meet a violent death. He was fearfully torn over and over again, but not killed".
