= Circus Krone =

German circus

Coordinates: 48°08′42″N 11°33′00″E

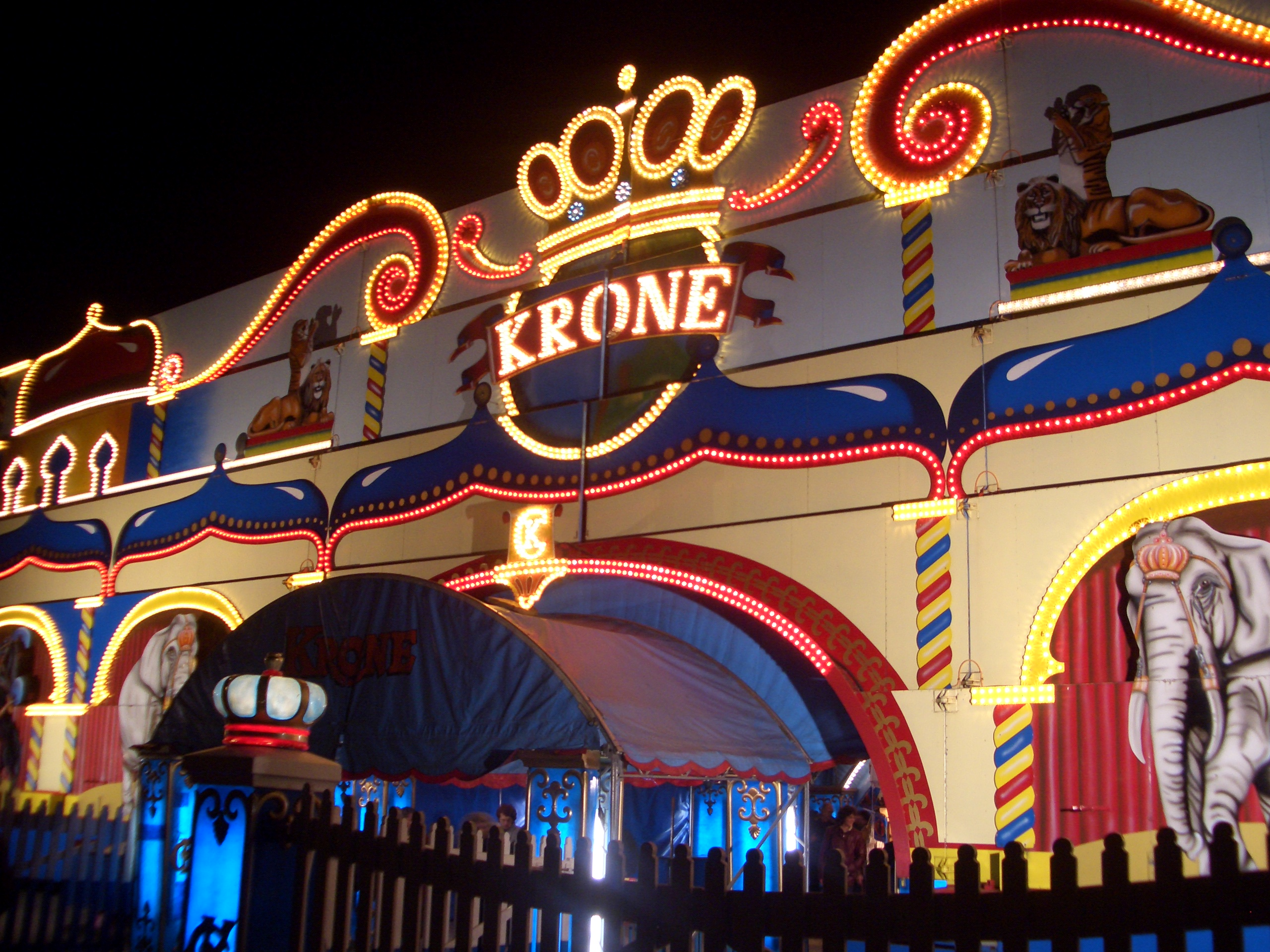
- Entrance to Circus Krone in Munich

Origin
- Country: Germany
- Founder(s): Carl Krone
- Year founded: 1905

Information
- Director: Jana Mandana Lacey-Krone
- Traveling show?: Yes
- Circus tent?: 5,000 seats
- Winter quarters: Munich, Germany
- Website: www.circus-krone.com

Circus Krone, based in Munich, is one of the largest circuses in Europe and one of the few in Western Europe (along with Cirque d'hiver de Paris, Cirque d'hiver d'Amiens and Cirque Royal in Brussels) to also occupy a building.

== History ==
It was founded in 1905 by Carl Krone (1870-1943) as an animal exhibition. Later the circus was run by his daughter Frieda Sembach-Krone and her husband Carl Sembach-Krone. From 1995 until 2017 their daughter Christel Sembach-Krone ran the circus.

Since 1919, the circus has also owned the Circus Krone Building in Munich. This was the site used by Hitler for his rallies for the Nazi Party in Munich. His ability to attract a crowd to fill this building was how he built his fame and rose to power. On December 12, 1944, the building was destroyed by bombing attacks. In 1950 it was rebuilt as a circus building with a seating capacity of 3,000 spectators.

Over a century, the Circus Krone Imperium became recognized world-wide as an institution within the circus world. The outstanding success was based on the maxim "entrepreneur spirit, love of animals and absolute seriousness". This maxim has been maintained throughout the illustrious history of the family owned and operated Circus Krone.

Carl Krone died in 1943. He did not live to experience the total destruction of the Circus Krone Building, caused by aerial bombardment. People and animals had been evacuated to the Krone Stud Farm in Wessling.

Christel Sembach-Krone directed the fate of the family owned and operated Circus Krone after the death of her father (Carl Sembach, died on January 18, 1984) and her mother (Frieda Sembach-Krone, died on November 2, 1995).

Christel Sembach-Krone, who remained unmarried and had an adoptive daughter named Jana Mandana Lacey-Krone, died on June 20, 2017, after a short illness.

Lacey-Krone, who is married to Martin Lacey, Jr. and has one son, will become the new director.

== Features ==
Circus Krone has a circus tent with 5,000 seats with a diameter of 48 by 64 metres and a dome height of 14 metres. It covers an overall area of approximately 2,000 square metres. The largest, most modern and most expensive circus tent of the present can only be described. The construction of the enormous tent allows for the seating of 5.000 spectators. Four 20 metre long steel masts, four steel lattice auxiliary masts, 120 storm and cross beams as well as 250 steel anchors provide necessary security, even during the most violent of storms. Erected in less than one day, the gigantic tent construction "stands" with seats, ménage, show stage, light and sound controls - ready for performances, officially certified and in top condition. Standards have been established in the area of the illumination engineering with Krone. Approximately 140 securely installed floodlights, as well as eight "golden scans" allow for the different lighting effects of the individual numbers. Four "searchlights" place artists and animals into spotlight. The total area of the tent approximately equates to the area of a football field.

Animals used at the circus include lions, Asian and African elephants, a hippopotamus, a rhinoceros, horses, monkeys, pigs, porcupines, goats, zebras and parrots.
