= Rose Flanders Bascom =

American lion tamer

- Born: 1880; Contoocook, New Hampshire
- Died: 1915 (aged 34–35)
- Occupation: Lion tamer
- Spouse: Alfred Bascom

Rose Flanders Bascom, born in Contoocook (a village of Hopkinton), Merrimack County, New Hampshire, in 1880, was the first American woman lion tamer, who performed in the circus in the early 1900s.

Rose Bascom with Lions

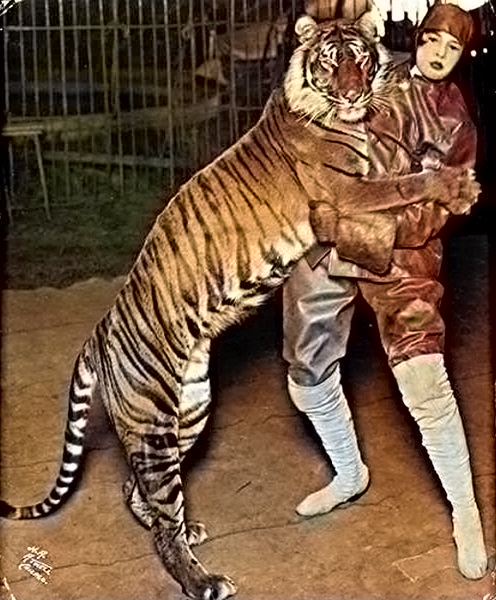
Rose and Tiger, circa 1914

In 1898, she married Alfred Bascom, who was of French Canadian ancestry but born in the United States. About 1905, Rose joined the circus life and became a lion tamer.

It is reported that she was clawed by a lion, resulting in an infection that led to her death around the year of 1915. She left behind her husband and their young daughter Agnes.
