= Mabel Stark =

American tiger trainer

- Born: Mary Ann Haynie; 1888 or 1889
- Died: April 20, 1968 (aged 78); Thousand Oaks, California, USA
- Occupation: Animal trainer
- Parent(s): Lela and Hardy Haynie

Mary Ann Haynie, commonly known as Mabel Stark (1888 or 1889 – April 20, 1968), was a renowned tiger trainer of the 1920s. She was referred to as one of the world's first women tiger trainers/tamers. In its belated obituary, The New York Times lauded Stark as "one of the most celebrated animal trainers in a field dominated by men."

== Biography ==
Born Mary Ann Haynie in 1888 or 1889, she grew up in Princeton, Kentucky. She was one of seven children born to Lela and Hardy Haynie.

Stark's parents were farmers, and they died within two years of each other, so that by the age of 17, Stark and her siblings were orphaned. She spent a short period of time with her aunt Kate Pettypoole in Princeton. She then traveled to Louisville and became a nurse at St. Mary's Hospital. Soon after, she left Louisville, and her history becomes difficult to trace.

Circus friends contend that she worked in carnivals as a "dancer" of some type. (Like many circus performers, Stark did not hesitate to enrich the truth to create an interesting story. She even once told an interviewer that she was born to a wealthy Canadian.)

While on vacation in 1911, she met animal trainer Al Sands, manager of the Al G. Barnes Circus based in Culver City, California. She began working with horses and goats, and after several years started working with big cats. She began work with Louis Roth, a famous "cat man" she would later marry. (Stark was married four times.)

Soon, she became a tiger trainer in the ring. At first, they had her work a "balloon act", which had her "riding" a lion on a platform and then pressing a pedal to release fireworks at some point in the act. But by 1916, she was presenting the show's major tiger act.

On February 18, 1916, Stark was severely mauled by a lion named Louie while rehearsing for the Pacific Electric exhibit of the National Orange Show in San Bernardino, California. Stark's husband, Louis Roth, fired blank cartridges from a revolver into the face of the lion amid the screams of his wife and spectators who had gathered to watch the rehearsal. The lion seized Stark's left arm into its mouth and rolled over a number of times. (Roth had also been mauled earlier that day by a lion named Jeff. He suffered deep injuries to his arm before firing blanks into the animal's open jaws.)

Stark was dragged unconscious from the cage and rushed to a hospital where she was treated for a mangled and broken arm. This was Stark's third mauling in as many years. In 1914, while in Detroit, Michigan, she was attacked by her leopards during a parade, and during the winter of 1915, she was mangled in Venice, California.

She adopted a mangy, sickly tiger cub named Rajah and raised him to perform a famous wrestling act with her. She accomplished this by romping and playing with the cub at the beach and actually keeping him as a pet in her apartment. According to Stark's autobiography, "Rajah would run straight toward me. Up he went on his hind legs, his forefeet around my neck. We turned around once or twice, I threw him to the ground, and we rolled three or four times. I opened his mouth and put my face inside, then jumped to my feet".

In 1922, she was asked to join the Ringling Bros. and Barnum & Bailey Circus where she performed in Madison Square Garden with tigers and a black panther. By the end of that season, of the six wild animal acts featured with the circus, Stark's was clearly the greatest success. In 1923, she starred in the Ringling center ring, but two years later in 1925, the circus banned all wild animal acts.

After a sojourn to Europe where she performed in a circus, she came back to the US in 1928 and began work with the John Robinson Show.

In 1928, Stark was attacked by two tigers after she fell in mud during her act. Due to a circus train arriving late, the tigers had not been fed for 24 hours. She suffered multiple broken bones and required 300 stitches. She suffered numerous maulings and serious injuries over her nearly 60 years of working with tigers. At one point in her career, she would face 18 big cats in the ring.

She performed with the Sells-Floto Circus in 1929 and then rejoined Barnes after it had been sold to Ringling in 1930. She stayed there until it was absorbed into Ringling Bros. and Barnum & Bailey during the season of 1938. In 1932, she and her tiger act was filmed for the Paramount Pictures motion picture King of the Jungle. In the film, Stark is seen putting her tigers through their paces when fire erupts in the big top. She collaborated with screenwriter Gertrude Orr to publish an autobiography, titled Hold That Tiger, in 1938.

She toured with small circuses and lived in Japan where she performed her circus act until the late 40's. She returned to California and worked the last 20 years of her career Jungleland in Thousand Oaks. Stark appeared occasionally on television in the 1960s. She appeared as a guest on What's My Line? in 1961 as a contestant whose profession the panel had to guess.

Stark was fired from Jungleland in 1967 after the facility's insurance company denied her coverage.

Three months later, she committed suicide by taking an overdose of barbiturates at her home in Thousand Oaks on April 20, 1968.

In the last pages of her autobiography, Hold That Tiger, Stark writes: "The chute door opens as I crack my whip and shout, 'Let them come,' Out slink the striped cats, snarling and roaring, leaping at each other or at me. It's a matchless thrill, and life without it is not worth while to me."

== Legacy ==
In 2001, a fictionalized biography of Stark's life by author Robert Hough titled The Final Confession of Mabel Stark was published. The story is based in 1968, the same year that Stark committed suicide. It is a fictionalized account of the events of her life. The screenplay was optioned by director Sam Mendes with the hopes of making a film starring his wife Kate Winslet; however, no production schedule has been announced. A documentary titled Mabel, Mabel, Tiger Trainer directed by Leslie Zemeckis premiered in 2017.

== See also ==
- Irina Bugrimova
