= Great British Circus =

Great British Circus was a company that specialized in circus entertainment. Unusually for a UK-based circus company, it included wild animals such as tigers, camels and lions in its acts. Martin Lacey was the company's owner and Circus Director. In 2012, at the age of 70, he announced he would retire and the Great British Circus would not return for a 2013 season.

== Use of wild animals ==
Martin Lacey defends the company's approach as follows: "The Circus takes veterinary advice from world-respected experts, not from campaign groups who too often seek to excite public sympathy in their quest for donations and support." Martin Lacey has bred tigers for many years and provided most of the tigers used in the Esso oil television advertisements up until the 1970s.

In April 2007, the Advertising Standards Authority (United Kingdom) upheld a complaint against the company's claim that it was "Voted No.1 for Animal Care". In February 2009, The Independent reported that the company brought performing elephants to a UK circus for the first time in ten years.

=== Early Day Motions ===
On March 3, 2009, an Early Day Motion was tabled by John Austin, referring to the introduction of elephants into the circus, as follows:

That this House shares the RSPCA's deep concern at the recent introduction of elephants into a circus in Nottinghamshire; hopes that the public will boycott the circus in protest; believes that the Government should intervene in this case and state categorically that it opposes the use of wild species in circuses; and urges the Government to bring forward proposals to ban the use of wild animals in circuses without further delay.

This motion was signed by 110 MPs. On the following day, another EDM was tabled by Mark Pritchard, specifically naming the Great British Circus, as follows:

That this House notes with concern the continuing use of non-domesticated animals in circuses and more recently the re-introduction of elephants by the Great British Circus; is increasingly concerned by the delay of the Department for the Environment, Food and Rural Affairs in reporting on increasing amounts of evidence surrounding poor animal welfare standards in circuses; believes that the report of the Chair of the Circus Working Group fails to provide reliable information on this subject; supports the work of the Captive Animals Protection Society and others in achieving an end to animal use in circuses; and urges the Government to maintain its commitment to ban the use of non-domesticated animals in travelling circuses and to limit the use of domesticated species under a strict, accountable and open licensing system.

This motion was signed by 78 MPs.

=== Protest and Investigations ===
The company's circus performances have attracted animals rights demonstrations at locations throughout the UK.

In August 2009, an undercover investigation secretly filmed a member of the circus staff hitting an elephant with a metal hook. The staff member was subsequently sacked.

== Noah's Ark Zoo Farm ==
On October 19, 2009, the company was referred to in allegations in a BBC documentary that visitor attraction Noah's Ark Zoo Farm secretly looked after animals on its behalf. Noah's Ark Zoo Farm was subsequently expelled from the British and Irish Association of Zoos and Aquariums (BIAZA) in December 2009. BIAZA noted in a statement that ''The reasons for termination are due to a refusal to provide BIAZA with information when requested and entering into an arrangement with the Great British Circus, which contravenes the Animal Transaction Policy, despite having been warned of possible consequences'' and that ''the behaviour of NAZF has brought the association into disrepute'' .

== Purchase ==
In 2014, Great British Circus was acquired by the Kirilov family. With over 20 years experience in circus throughout Europe, they redesigned and modernised the show, without the inclusion of any animals. Great British Circus is now a blend of traditional circus performers, hi-tech acts, music and dance, reminiscent of live theatre shows.

The Kirilovs, originating from Bulgaria, are the third generation of showmen and also own other entertainment ventures, including Big Kid Circus and Billi Smiles Circus, which operate throughout the world.
