= Claire Heliot =

German lion tamer

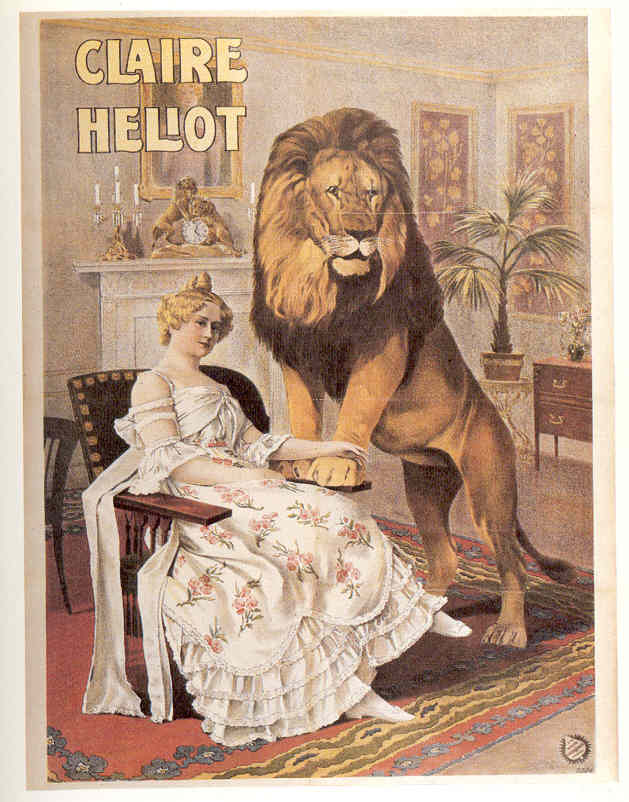
Claire Heliot

Klara Haumann (née Pleßke; 3 December 1866 – 9 June 1953), known professionally as Claire Heliot, was a German lion tamer.

== Biography ==
Klara Pleßke was born in Halle on 3 December 1866. Her father was a government postal official.

In April 1897, she caused a sensation when she first performed at a zoo in Leipzig. She toured extensively. Accompanied by ten lions, she performed at the London Hippodrome in 1901. In America, Heriot's act was part of A Yankee Circus on Mars, appearing at the New York Hippodrome for 20 weeks in 1905 and 1906, and in Chicago in 1906. The high point of her act was carrying her ten-year-old, 159-kilogram (351 lb) lion Sicchi on her back and shoulders. In 1907, a nervous Heliot was attacked by her lions and severely injured while performing at the Circus Orlando in Copenhagen; she was rescued by three attendants. After she retired, she was reported working as a hairdresser in 1930.

She died in Stuttgart on 9 June 1953.

The Heliot restaurant at the Hippodrome Casino in London is named after her.
