= Blighty (disambiguation) =

Blighty is an English slang term for Britain.

Blighty may also refer to:

- Blighty, New South Wales, a town in Australia
- Blighty (TV channel), a former UKTV channel
- Blighty (magazine) or Parade, a British magazine for men
- Blighty (film), a 1927 silent film by Adrian Brunel
