= Freedom for Animals =

English charity campaigning to end the use of animals in entertainment

- Abbreviation: FFA
- Formation: 1957; 69 years ago
- Type: Charitable organisation
- Purpose: Animal rights, animal welfare
- Headquarters: Manchester
- Location: United Kingdom
- Director: Dr Andrew Kelly
- Website: www.freedomforanimals.org.uk

Freedom for Animals (FFA) is the working name of the Captive Animals' Protection Society, a charity registered in England campaigning to end the display of animals in zoos, and the use of animals in entertainment, such as circuses, the exotic pet trade and the audio-visual industry.

== History ==
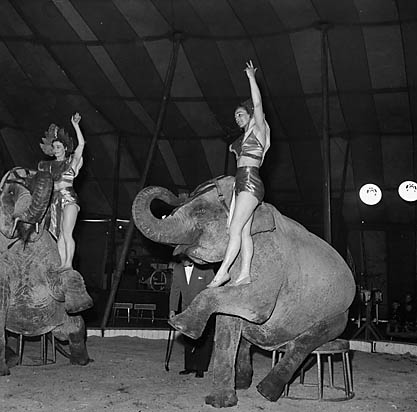
Circus elephants in Wales, 1956

Freedom for Animals was founded as the Captive Animals' Protection Society in 1957 by retired school teacher Irene Heaton, at a time when circuses were at their peak and all had animals. Former Mayor of Woolwich John W. Andrews has also been cited as a founder and first secretary. The first meeting of the organisation was held at Lady Margaret Hall Settlement, Kennington Road on March 23, 1957. Upon its founding there were 30 members including Arthur Skeffington. The main aim of the organisation was to press for legislation against the use of performing animals. John W. Andrews commented that it is "unnatural and cruel to see an elephant sitting on a bucket or lion jumping through a hoop. Most of the training is done abroad and cruelty will not be easy to prove, but I feel this specialised job can be done now through this new society".

In 1965, FFA promoted a bill to the House of Lords, sponsored by Lord Somers (who was then president of FFA) to prohibit the use of performing animals. Despite much support it was defeated by just 14 votes.

The 1970s saw FFA organising demonstrations outside circuses. Pressure increased on animal circuses in the 1980s, gaining the support of the National Council of Women and local authorities started to prohibit circuses from using council land.

From 1975 to 1997, Sir Andrew Bowden served as its National President.

In the mid-1980s FFA started a campaign to end animal acts at the prestigious Blackpool Tower Circus, where for six months of every year the animals were confined in the cellars of the tower. Three years later, it was announced that animal acts would stop at the circus once the contract expired in 1990. When the circus owner moved to the adjoining Pleasure Beach there were weekly demonstrations. Backed by vets and other experts, the campaign worked and in 1997 Blackpool Pleasure Beach announced there would be no more animal circuses on its land.

FFA became a registered charity in 2008. In March 2018 FFA changed its name from the Captive Animals Protection Society to Freedom for Animals.

== Campaigns ==
FFA has carried out investigations into both the zoo and circus industries in the UK and Ireland and has carried out and published various research projects relating to the use of animals in entertainment. The organisation founded and manages the annual Zoo Awareness Weekend event, which seeks to encourage public debate on the zoo industry from ethical, animal welfare, educational and conservation perspectives.

In 2004 it commissioned the largest and most in-depth investigation ever made into the public aquarium industry, revealing most animals to have been taken from the wild and disputing conservation claims by the industry.

In 2011 a report was released which highlighted the charity's concerns over the efficacy of legal protection of animals in zoos in England. The report raised queries over the enforcement of the law and suggested that the system of inspection for zoos that is currently in place is unworkable.

In 2012 FFA established the AnimalPledge.org scheme which seeks to encourage the media industry to refrain from the use of performing wild animals in productions. The project was established in partnership with the Ape Alliance.

In 2013 FFA launched a new campaign entitled the "Fight for Flight". The campaign seeks to outlaw the practice of pinioning of birds in zoos. The charity's research found that the practice was being carried out illegally by members of the zoo industry.

Campaigning against the use of animals in circuses has remained a core focus, supporting protests against travelling circuses around the UK.

The organisation has frequently expressed an opposition to zoos of any form.

== Patrons ==
The charity's patrons are:

- Marc Bekoff, Professor Emeritus of Ecology and Evolutionary Biology at the University of Colorado
- Britta Jaschinski, photographer
- Randy Malamud, professor of English at Georgia State University
- Fiona Oakes, elite marathon runner
- Angela Smith, Baroness Smith of Basildon, Labour Co-operative life peer and former Member of Parliament and government minister
- Peter Tatchell, human rights campaigner

== See also ==
- List of animal rights groups
